= SMK Sultan Badlishah =

Location
- Jalan Sultan Badlishah, 09000 Kulim, Kedah, Malaysia

Information
- Former names: Government English School, Badlishah School, Sultan Badlishah School
- School type: Secondary School, Cluster School
- Motto: Bersih Setia (Clean Loyal)
- Established: 8 January 1948; 78 years ago
- Session: Morning and afternoon
- Principal: Saniah binti Che Omar
- Grades: Forms 1 to 5
- Gender: Co-educational
- Language: Malay, English
- Houses: Sultan, Sultanah, Syed Omar, Samsudin
- Colours: Blue and Yellow
- Yearbook: Daya Karya
- Website: https://badlishah.edu.my/

SMK Sultan Badlishah (Sultan Badlishah National Secondary School; abbreviated SMKSB) is a secondary school in Kulim, Kedah, Malaysia. Established in 1948, it is one of the oldest schools in Kedah. It is also designated as a cluster school by the Ministry of Education.

== History ==
The school began as the Government English School on 8 January 1948, at the Kedah Volunteer Force Drill Hall. It is the third English-medium school to be established in Kedah and the first secondary school to be established in southern Kedah (catering the Kulim, Baling and Bandar Baharu districts). The idea to establish the school was initiated and led by Syed Omar bin Syed Abdullah Shahabuddin, the then Kulim District Officer. Prior to the school's establishment, parents have no choice but to send their children to secondary schools in Bukit Mertajam or Sungai Petani.

In 1953, the school became known as Badlishah School taking the name of Sultan Badlishah of Kedah, in conjunction with the Sultan's visit the year before. The school name became Sultan Badlishah School in 1959.

The school celebrated its Silver Jubilee in 1973 and its Golden Jubilee in 1998, officiated by the Kulim District Officer, Tuan Syed Harun Al Jafree and the Minister of Education, Dato' Sri Najib Razak respectively.

== Principals ==
- 1948 to 1956: Samsudin bin Mohd Yusuf
- 1956 to 1958: Leong Lan Oyee
- 1958 to 1961: Chn'g Lum Tong
- 1961 to 1962: Saad bin Lazim
- 1962 to 1965: David Singh
- 1966 to 1969: Ong Leng Gin
- 1969 to 1974: J. P. Augustin
- 1974 to 1975: Chiam Tah Wen
- 1975 to 1979: Abd Wahab bin Ghani
- 1979 to 1983: G. Rajagopal
- 1984 to 1993: Harun bin Rejab
- 1993 to 1995: Mat Rejab bin Che Mat
- 1995 to 1999: Rahim bin Said
- 1999 to 2001: Ahmad bin Hussein
- 2001 to 2012: Azizah binti Rasol
- 2012 to 2013: Zaharah binti Ishak
- 2013 to 2017: Ommi Kalsom binti Haji Ibrahim
- 2017 to 2020: Yazi bin Yusof
- 2020 to current: Saniah binti Che Omar

== Notable alumni ==
- Abdul Kadir bin Sheikh Fadzir - MP for Kulim-Bandar Baharu (1986 to 2008), Minister of Culture, Arts and Tourism (1999 to 2004), Minister of Information (2004 to 2006)
- Alauddin bin Mohd Sheriff- President of the Court of Appeal (2008 to 2011)
- Raja Ariffin bin Raja Sulaiman - MP for Baling (1986 to 1999), Deputy Minister in the Prime Minister's Department (1987 to 1996)
