= Zulkifli Noordin =

Malaysian politician

Yang Berbahagia Datuk Seri Zulkifli Noordin SMW DIMP
- ذوالکيفلي نورالدين

Member of the Malaysian Parliament for Kulim–Bandar Baharu
- In office 8 March 2008 – 5 May 2013
- Preceded by: Abdul Kadir Sheikh Fadzir (BN–UMNO)
- Succeeded by: Abdul Aziz Sheikh Fadzir (BN–UMNO)
- Majority: 5,583 (2008)

Personal details
- Born: 19 February 1962 (age 64) Baling, Kedah, Federation of Malaya (now Malaysia)
- Party: Malaysian Islamic Party (PAS) (1997–2008); People's Justice Party (PKR) (2008–2010); Independent (2010–2013); United Malays National Organisation (UMNO) (2013–2025); Malaysian United Indigenous Party (BERSATU) (2025–present)
- Occupation: Politician
- Profession: Sharia lawyer
- Website: zul4kulim.blogspot.com

Zulkifli bin Noordin (born 19 February 1962) is a Malaysian politician who served as Member of the Parliament (MP) for Kulim–Bandar Baharu from March 2008 to May 2013. He held the seat as an independent, although having been elected on the ticket and as a member of the People's Justice Party (PKR) but was sacked in 2010. Zulkifli was also the deputy president of right-wing Malay organisation, Perkasa.

Zulkifli was elected to the Parliament in the 2008 election. His election had been contested by the defeated UMNO candidate; However the court petition to overturn the result was eventually withdrawn. In the 2013 election, he contested the Shah Alam parliamentary seat under the Barisan Nasional ticket and was defeated.

Zulkifli is also a Sharia lawyer.

== Controversies ==
=== Allah issue ===
Zulkifli Nordin was a public figure in the controversy over the use of the word 'Allah' in a Catholic publication. In response to the decision of the High Court allowing the publication Herald, Zulkifli stated "I can't understand how any Muslim can support this judgment". Zulkifli also called for the resignation of a Pan-Malaysian Islamic Party MP, Khalid Samad for supporting the right of Christians to use the word 'Allah'.

=== Dismissal from PKR ===
On 6 March 2010, Zulkifli was dismissed from PKR following the unanimous decision of a party disciplinary panel arising from Zulkifli's lodging of a police report against Khalid Samad and his public criticisms of the Chief Minister of Penang, Lim Guan Eng. Zulkifli's request to have his case heard by an all-Muslim disciplinary panel had been dismissed by the party. He immediately indicated he would remain in Parliament as an independent. He has been vocal in criticising the federal opposition, especially PKR, since his dismissal.

=== Insulting remarks against Hindus ===
In March 2013, Zulkifli Noordin has been heavily criticised by several Hindu politicians after giving a religious sermon belittling Hinduism. A YouTube video of the speech has been circulating on social media. In his speech, he explained how he laughed at the Indian traders on why the Hindu gods could not prevent the trader's shop from being flooded. He also questioned the purity and holiness of the Ganges River, India, which is considered sacred by the Hindus, claiming that the Ganges River is filled with chicken carcasses and twigs floating. Besides that, Zulkifli also mocked the Hindu god Lord Ganesha, by questioning why the Hindus are fighting over buying the deity's statue with the trunk broken. He also questioned the holiness of the Hindu gods when he said when the broken parts of the statue can just be mended by plaster.

The video clip has sparked outrage among many people from the Malaysian Hindu community. PKR vice-president and lawyer N. Surendran wants Zulkifli to be charged with Section 298A of the Penal Code for uttering words which causes disharmony, feelings of enmity, hatred or ill-will on grounds of religion. He added that Zulkifli is a close ally with Malaysian Prime Minister Datuk Seri Najib Razak, in which he described that UMNO and Barisan Nasional must take responsibility for the sacrilegious remarks and mockery of Hinduism.

MIC central working committee member Datuk T. Rajagopalu told Zulkifli to 'shut up' and apologise for his insensitive remarks against the Hindus. He added that Zulkifli is unfit to be an MP, describing the lawyer as a half-baked lawyer and not a true Muslim man. MIC vice-president Datuk S.K. Devamany also demanded that Zulkifli apologise and withdraw his remarks. Aside from them, MIC central working committee member P. Kamalanathan condemned Zulkifli's remarks "in the harshest manner possible." Human rights group SUARAM also rebuked Zulkifli and urged voters to reject him in the upcoming Malaysian 13th general elections. Hindu Sangam chief said that no legal action were taken against Zulkifli because he is a Muslim and vice-president of Perkasa.

Zulkifli later apologised on 1 April 2013 for hurting the feelings of the Indian community. This change of sentiment was most probably due to the upcoming 13th general election.

Zulkifli Nordin also states that his statement was made during his days in PAS and he was remorseful for his actions. He also added he had made a lot of mistakes during his tenure as a PAS member and also as a lawyer for Anwar Ibrahim. One of those mistake is the remarks he made to the Hindu community in Malaysia. The video resurfaced only recently after he was ousted by the Pakatan Rakyat and now he is facing attacks from his former colleague even though no PAS members made any statements during Zulkifli Nordin's tenure as a representative from PAS.

=== Insensitive remarks on the passing of Karpal Singh ===
On 17 April 2014, Zulkifli Noordin commented that Allah had killed off Karpal had received swift criticisms from Barisan Nasional and Opposition MPs.

== Election results ==
Parliament of Malaysia
Year	Constituency	Candidate	Votes	Pct	Opponent(s)	Votes	Pct	Ballots cast	Majority	Turnout
2004	P112 Kuala Langat	Zulkifli Noordin (PKR)	12,623	27.01%	Shafie Salleh (UMNO)	34,118	72.99%	48,694	21,495	77.11%
2008	P018 Kulim–Bandar Baharu	Zulkifli Noordin (PKR)	22,255	57.17%	Abdul Aziz Sheikh Fadzir (UMNO)	16,672	42.83%	40,182	5,583	77.28%
2013	P108 Shah Alam	Zulkifli Noordin (UMNO)	38,070	43.72%	Khalid Abdul Samad (PAS)	49,099	56.28%	88,128	10,939	88.17%

== Honours ==
- Federal Territory (Malaysia)
  - Grand Commander of the Order of the Territorial Crown (SMW) – Datuk Seri (2016)
- Pahang
  - Knight Companion of the Order of the Crown of Pahang (DIMP) – Dato' (2010)
