= Pantai Jerejak =

State constituency in Penang, Malaysia

Pantai Jerejak (N36)
Penang constituency
- Pantai Jerejak (olive) on Penang Island

State constituency
- Legislature: Penang State Legislative Assembly
MLA
Fahmi Zainol
PH
- Constituency created: 2004
- First contested: 2004
- Last contested: 2023

Demographics
- Electors (2023): 29,890
- Area (km²): 11

Pantai Jerejak is a state constituency in Penang, Malaysia, that has been represented in the Penang State Legislative Assembly since 2004. It covers a portion of southeastern Penang Island, including Bayan Baru and the northern half of the Bayan Lepas Free Industrial Zone.

The state constituency was first contested in 2004 and is mandated to return a single Assemblyman to the Penang State Legislative Assembly under the first-past-the-post voting system. Since 2018, the State Assemblyman for Pantai Jerejak is Saifuddin Nasution Ismail from Parti Keadilan Rakyat (PKR), which is part of the state's ruling coalition, Pakatan Harapan (PH).

== Definition ==
The Pantai Jerejak constituency contains the polling districts of Bandar Bayan Baru, Jalan Mahsuri, Jalan Tengah, Taman Melati, Pantai Jerejak, Pintasan Bahagia and Taman Sri Nibong. According to a proposed redelineation exercise in 2016, Taman Melati is to be renamed as Lebuh Mahsuri.

This state constituency encompasses all of the neighbourhood of Bayan Baru, as well as the northern half of the Bayan Lepas Free Industrial Zone. Among the landmarks within the state seat are Setia SPICE and Queensbay Mall.

In addition, the Pantai Jerejak constituency contains Jerejak Island, a large uninhabited islet just off the southeastern coast of Penang Island.

=== Polling districts ===
According to the federal gazette issued on 30 March 2018, the Pantai Jerejak constituency is divided into 7 polling districts.

| State constituency | Polling districts | Code | Location |
|---|---|---|---|
| Pantai Jerejak (N36) | Pantai Jerejak | 052/36/01 | SK Sg Nibong |
| Pantai Jerejak (N36) | Taman Seri Nibong | 052/36/02 | SJK (C) Shih Chung Cawangan |
| Pantai Jerejak (N36) | Pintasan Bahagia | 052/36/03 | SJK (C) Kwang Hwa |
| Pantai Jerejak (N36) | Jalan Mahsuri | 052/36/04 | SK Bayan Baru |
| Pantai Jerejak (N36) | Bandar Bayan Baru | 052/36/05 | SMK Raja Tun Uda |
| Pantai Jerejak (N36) | Jalan Tengah | 052/36/06 | SMK Raja Tun Uda |
| Pantai Jerejak (N36) | Lebuh Mahsuri | 052/36/07 | SK Bayan Baru |

== Demographics ==
Ethnic breakdown of Pantai Jerejak's electorate as of 2023
1. Chinese (50.6%)
2. Malay (35.8%)
3. Indian (12.4%)
4. Other ethnicities (1.18%)

Total electors by polling district in 2016
| Polling district | Electors |
|---|---|
| Bandar Bayan Baru | 3,151 |
| Jalan Mahsuri | 2,921 |
| Jalan Tengah | 1,568 |
| Lebuh Mahsuri | 3,854 |
| Pantai Jerejak | 4,046 |
| Pintasan Bahagia | 2,110 |
| Taman Sri Nibong | 4,671 |
| Total | 22,321 |
Source: Malaysian Election Commission

== History ==
Penang State Legislative Assemblyman for Pantai Jerejak
| Assembly | No | Years | Member | Party |
Constituency created from Batu Uban and Bayan Lepas
| 11th | N36 | 2004 – 2008 | Wong Mun Hoe (黄万河) | BN (GERAKAN) |
| 12th | N36 | 2008 – 2013 | Sim Tze Tzin (沈志勤) | PR (PKR) |
| 13th | N36 | 2013 – 2015 | Mohd Rashid Hasnon | PR (PKR) |
| 13th | N36 | 2015 – 2018 | Mohd Rashid Hasnon | PH (PKR) |
| 14th | N36 | 2018 – 2023 | Saifuddin Nasution Ismail | PH (PKR) |
| 15th | N36 | 2023–present | Fahmi Zainol | PH (PKR) |

== Election results ==
The electoral results for the Pantai Jerejak state constituency in 2008, 2013 and 2018 are as follows.

Penang state election, 2023: Pantai Jerejak
| Party | Candidate | Votes | % | ∆% |
|---|---|---|---|---|
| PH | Fahmi Zainol | 14,116 | 69.93 | ▼3.52 |
| PN | Oh Tong Keong | 5,519 | 27.34 | ▲27.34 |
| MUDA | Priyankaa Loh Siang Pin | 476 | 2.36 | ▲2.36 |
| Parti Rakyat Malaysia | Ravinder Singh | 76 | 0.38 | ▲0.38 |
| Total valid votes | | 20,187 | 100.00 | |
| Total rejected ballots | | 110 | | |
| Unreturned ballots | | 41 | | |
| Turnout | | 20,334 | 68.03 | ▼13.65 |
| Registered electors | | 29,890 | | |
| Majority | | 8,597 | 42.59 | ▼13.57 |
| PH hold | | Swing | | |

Penang state election, 2018: Pantai Jerejak
| Party | Candidate | Votes | % | ∆% |
|---|---|---|---|---|
| PKR | Saifuddin Nasution Ismail | 14,014 | 73.45 | ▲8.79 |
| BN | Oh Tong Keong | 3,298 | 17.29 | ▼18.05 |
| PAS | Mohd Farhan Yusri | 1,670 | 8.75 | ▲8.75 |
| BERSAMA | Yim Boon Leong | 97 | 0.51 | ▲0.51 |
| Total valid votes | | 19,079 | 100.00 | |
| Total rejected ballots | | 150 | | |
| Unreturned ballots | | 86 | | |
| Turnout | | 19,315 | 81.68 | ▼3.96 |
| Registered electors | | 23,646 | | |
| Majority | | 10,716 | 56.16 | ▲26.84 |
| PKR hold | | Swing | | |
Source(s) "His Majesty's Government Gazette - Notice of Contested Election, State Legislative Assembly for the State of Penang [P.U. (B) 252/2018]" (PDF). Attorney General's Chambers of Malaysia. 3 May 2018. "Federal Government Gazette - Results of Contested Election and Statements of the Poll after the Official Addition of Votes, State Constituencies for the State of Penang [P.U. (B) 326/2018]" (PDF). Attorney General's Chambers of Malaysia. 28 May 2018. Archived from the original (PDF) on August 29, 2019.

Penang state election, 2013: Pantai Jerejak
| Party | Candidate | Votes | % | ∆% |
|---|---|---|---|---|
| PKR | Mohd Rashid Hasnon | 11,805 | 64.66 | ▲9.71 |
| BN | Wong Mun Hoe | 6,451 | 35.34 | ▼9.71 |
| Total valid votes | | 18,256 | 100.00 | |
| Total rejected ballots | | 161 | | |
| Unreturned ballots | | 47 | | |
| Turnout | | 18,464 | 85.64 | ▲11.70 |
| Registered electors | | 21,560 | | |
| Majority | | 5,354 | 29.32 | ▲19.42 |
| PKR hold | | Swing | | |
Source(s) "Federal Government Gazette - Notice of Contested Election, State Legislative Assembly for the State of Penang [P.U. (B) 189/2013]" (PDF). Attorney General's Chambers of Malaysia. 26 April 2013. "Federal Government Gazette - Results of Contested Election and Statements of the Poll after the Official Addition of Votes, State Constituencies for the State of Penang [P.U. (B) 230/2013]" (PDF). Attorney General's Chambers of Malaysia. 22 May 2013. Archived from the original (PDF) on 22 March 2019.

Penang state election, 2008: Pantai Jerejak
| Party | Candidate | Votes | % | ∆% |
|---|---|---|---|---|
| PKR | Sim Tze Tzin | 6,982 | 54.95 | ▲29.62 |
| BN | Wong Mun Hoe | 5,724 | 45.05 | ▼29.62 |
| Total valid votes | | 12,706 | 100.00 | |
| Total rejected ballots | | 192 | | |
| Unreturned ballots | | 0 | | |
| Turnout | | 12,898 | 73.94 | ▲1.60 |
| Registered electors | | 17,445 | | |
| Majority | | 1,258 | 9.90 | ▼39.43 |
| PKR gain from BN | | Swing | | ? |

Penang state election, 2004: Pantai Jerejak
| Party | Candidate | Votes | % |
|---|---|---|---|
| BN | Wong Mun Hoe | 8,904 | 74.67 |
| PKR | Syed Mohamad Nazli Syed Ahmad | 3,021 | 25.33 |
| Total valid votes | | 11,925 | 100.00 |
| Total rejected ballots | | 115 | |
| Unreturned ballots | | 1 | |
| Turnout | | 12,041 | 72.33 |
| Registered electors | | 16,647 | |
| Majority | | 5,883 | 49.33 |
This was a new constituency created.

== See also ==
- Constituencies of Penang
