= Sim Tze Tzin =

Malaysian politician and engineer

Yang Berhormat Tuan Sim Tze Tzin MP
- 沈志勤

Deputy Minister of Investment, Trade and Industry
- Incumbent
- Assumed office 17 December 2025
- Monarch: Ibrahim Iskandar
- Prime Minister: Anwar Ibrahim
- Minister: Johari Abdul Ghani
- Preceded by: Liew Chin Tong
- Constituency: Bayan Baru

Deputy Minister of Agriculture and Agro-based Industry
- In office 2 July 2018 – 24 February 2020
- Monarchs: Muhammad V (2018–2019); Abdullah (2019–2020)
- Prime Minister: Mahathir Mohamad
- Minister: Salahuddin Ayub
- Preceded by: Tajuddin Abdul Rahman (Deputy Minister of Agriculture and Agro-based Industry I); Anthony Nogeh Gumbek (Deputy Minister of Agriculture and Agro-based Industry II)
- Succeeded by: Ahmad Hamzah (Deputy Minister of Agriculture and Food Industries I); Che Abdullah Mat Nawi (Deputy Minister of Agriculture and Food Industries II)
- Constituency: Bayan Baru

Political Secretary of the Office of the President of the People's Justice Party
- Incumbent
- Assumed office 8 April 2024 Serving with Onn Abu Bakar & Manivannan Gowindasamy & Juwairiya Zulkifli
- President: Anwar Ibrahim
- Senior Political Secretary and Coordinator: Romli Ishak
- Preceded by: Position established

Member of the Malaysian Parliament for Bayan Baru
- Incumbent
- Assumed office 5 May 2013
- Preceded by: Zahrain Mohamed Hashim (PR–PKR)
- Majority: 19,307 (2013); 37,751 (2018); 34,902 (2022)

Member of the Penang State Legislative Assembly for Pantai Jerejak
- In office 8 March 2008 – 5 May 2013
- Preceded by: Wong Mun Hoe (BN–GERAKAN)
- Succeeded by: Mohd Rashid Hasnon (PR–PKR)
- Majority: 1,258 (2008)

Personal details
- Born: Sim Tze Tzin; 6 February 1976 (age 50) George Town, Penang, Malaysia
- Citizenship: Malaysian
- Party: People's Justice Party (PKR)
- Other political affiliations: Pakatan Rakyat (PR) (2008–2015); Pakatan Harapan (PH) (since 2015)
- Education: University of Technology Malaysia (BEng); San José State University (MEng)
- Occupation: Politician
- Profession: Engineer
- Website: simtzetzin.com

Sim Tze Tzin

Chinese name
- Traditional Chinese: 沈志勤
- Hanyu Pinyin: Shěn Zhìqín
- Jyutping: Sam2 Zi3 Kan4
- Hokkien POJ: Sím Chì-khîn

Sim Tze Tzin (Chinese: 沈志勤; pinyin: Shěn Zhìqín; Pe̍h-ōe-jī: Sím Chì-khîn; Pe̍h-ūe-jī:Sím Chì-khêng; born 6 February 1976) is a Malaysian politician and engineer who has served as the Deputy Minister of Investment, Trade and Industry in the Unity Government administration under Prime Minister Anwar Ibrahim and Minister Johari Abdul Ghani since December 2025, Political Secretary of the Office of the President of the People's Justice Party (PKR) since April 2024 and the Member of Parliament (MP) for Bayan Baru since May 2013. He served as the Deputy Minister of Agriculture and Agro-based Industry in the Pakatan Harapan (PH) administration under former Prime Minister Mahathir Mohamad and former Minister Salahuddin Ayub from July 2018 to the collapse of the PH administration in February 2020 and Member of the Penang State Legislative Assembly (MLA) for Pantai Jerejak from March 2008 to May 2013. He is a member of Parliamentary Special Select Committee for International Affairs. He is a member, Deputy Strategic Director and Division Chief of Bayan Baru of the PKR, a component party of the PH coalition. He also served as the Political Secretary to Anwar Ibrahim, Prime Minister, Chairman of PH and President of PKR.

== Early life and education ==
Sim was born in George Town, Penang and attended Hu Yew Seah School for his primary education, later moving on to Chung Ling High School. In 1996, he joined the Reserve Army, and became a Junior Lieutenant in 1999. His interest in politics began after the Tiananmen Square protests of 1989 and the Oslo Accord, which he says contributed to his "political awakening". In 1998, he joined the Reformasi movement initiated by Anwar, and founded the Malaysia Youth and Students Democratic Movement (DEMA) "to promote democratic awareness among Malaysian citizens and to protest against the University and University College Act".

He graduated with a Bachelor of Engineering with Honours from Universiti Teknologi Malaysia in 1999. He later obtained a Masters of Science (Civil) in Highway Engineering from San José State University, while working full time in California as a highway design engineer from 2001 to 2006. While in the United States, Sim founded the Malaysia Forum Organization in Stanford University, a group promoting civil society and discussion of Malaysian issues.

== Political career ==
After five years working in the US, Sim returned to Malaysia and joined PKR. Working under Anwar, he played a significant role in the release of a video clip purporting to show the fixing of judicial appointments and court decisions. He was later named as a witness for the Royal Commission of Inquiry into the Lingam Video Clip, but as of March 2008 has not been called to testify.

In the 2008 general election, Sim contested in the Penang state constituency of Pantai Jerejak under the PKR ticket. He won by a majority of 1,258 votes. He was one of four major players in the Lingam video clip scandal who won election – the others were Loh Gwo Burne (elected as MP for Kelana Jaya), Wee Choo Keong (elected as MP for Wangsa Maju), and Sivarasa Rasiah (elected as MP for Subang).

In the 2013 general election, Sim contested the parliamentary seat of Bayan Baru instead and won to be a Member of Parliament. He contested again the parliamentary seat in the 2018 general election and won to retain it. He was appointed as the Deputy Minister of Agriculture and Agro-based Industry in July 2018 by the new PH formed federal government then.

== Controversies and issues ==
=== Lingam's case witnesses were not called ===
He is one of the witnesses in the Lingam video clip case. But on January 28, 2008, the royal commission investigating Lingam's video clip had decided not to summon him to testify on the clip's investigation because according to Tan Sri Haidar Mohd Noor, the Commission's chairman, the evidence to be given them was irrelevant to the investigation which is run.

=== Urged Zahrain to vacate the Bayan Baru parliamentary seat ===
On March 14, 2010, he sent a total of 2,108 signatures collected within two days from voters around the Bayan Baru market and the Fairgrounds in Sungai Nibong, Penang to Bayan Baru's independent MP Datuk Zahrain Mohamed Hashim and urged him to vacate his seat before The House of Commons convened on 15 March 2010.

== Personal life ==
Sim is married.

== Election results ==
Penang State Legislative Assembly
Year	Constituency	Candidate	Votes	Pct	Opponent(s)	Votes	Pct	Ballots cast	Majority	Turnout
2008	N36 Pantai Jerejak	Sim Tze Tzin (PKR)	6,982	54.95%	Wong Mun Hoe (Gerakan)	5,724	45.05%	12,898	1,258	73.94%

Parliament of Malaysia
Year	Constituency	Candidate	Votes	Pct	Opponent(s)	Votes	Pct	Ballots cast	Majority	Turnout
2013	P052 Bayan Baru	Sim Tze Tzin (PKR)	43,558	64.06%	Tang Heap Seng (MCA)	24,251	35.66%	68,849	19,307	86.98%
2018	P052 Bayan Baru	Sim Tze Tzin (PKR)	51,555	68.88%	Chuah Seng Guan (MCA)	13,804	18.44%	75,884	37,751	83.59%
2018	P052 Bayan Baru	Sim Tze Tzin (PKR)	51,555	68.88%	Iszuree Ibrahim (PAS)	8,757	11.70%	75,884	37,751	83.59%
2018	P052 Bayan Baru	Sim Tze Tzin (PKR)	51,555	68.88%	Yim Boon Leong (MUP)	733	0.98%	75,884	37,751	83.59%
2022	P052 Bayan Baru	Sim Tze Tzin (PKR)	55,209	61.54%	Oh Tong Keong (Gerakan)	20,307	22.64%	89,707	34,902	79.63%
2022	P052 Bayan Baru	Sim Tze Tzin (PKR)	55,209	61.54%	Saw Yee Fung (MCA)	13,377	14.91%	89,707	34,902	79.63%
2022	P052 Bayan Baru	Sim Tze Tzin (PKR)	55,209	61.54%	Ooi Chuan Aun (WARISAN)	440	0.49%	89,707	34,902	79.63%
2022	P052 Bayan Baru	Sim Tze Tzin (PKR)	55,209	61.54%	Ravinder Singh (PRM)	251	0.28%	89,707	34,902	79.63%
2022	P052 Bayan Baru	Sim Tze Tzin (PKR)	55,209	61.54%	Kan Chee Yuen (IND)	124	0.14%	89,707	34,902	79.63%

== Honours ==
=== Honours of Malaysia ===
- Malaysia
  - Recipient of the 17th Yang di-Pertuan Agong Installation Medal (2024)

== See also ==
- Bayan Baru (federal constituency)
