= 2014 Malaysian sedition dragnet =

The 2014 Malaysian sedition dragnet was a campaign by the government of Malaysia where several citizens were arrested and charged for allegedly making seditious statements in contravention of Section 4 of the Sedition Act 1948. The term "sedition dragnet" is widely used by the Malaysian media to describe the campaign.

== Background ==
The Sedition Act is considered by opposition politicians and activists to be an outdated draconian law introduced by the British colonial government which aims to stifle freedom of expression. Government officials however consider the Sedition Act as necessary to maintain peace in the country.

Another controversial piece of legislation, the Internal Security Act (ISA), was repealed in 2012 by the Najib Razak administration and replaced with the Security Offences (Special Measures) Act 2012 following mounting criticism of the ISA, another colonial era law which had allowed for preventive detention and extrajudicial detention.

Activists and politicians have complained that the dragnet was carried out despite prime minister Najib's earlier promises to repeal the Sedition Act.

== Arrests ==
Among the people arrested were opposition politicians Khalid Abdul Samad, N. Surendran and Teresa Kok while among non-politicians who were arrested were Universiti Malaya law professor, Azmi Sharom and Malaysiakini journalist Susan Loone as well as other political activists. Muhammad Safwan Anang who was convicted under the Sedition Act on 5 September 2014 was charged earlier in 2013 together with PKR's Tian Chua, PAS' Tamrin Ghafar Baba, student activist Adam Adli and social activists Harris Ibrahim and Hishamuddin Rais in relation to their role in allegedly inciting the people to change government through illegal means and is arguably not part of this sedition dragnet. All persons listed below were arrested or charged under the Sedition Act unless specified otherwise.

People arrested and/or charged in the sedition dragnet
Name	Background	Date of charge	Current status	Alleged seditious act
Ng Wei Aik	DAP Member of Parliament for Tanjong constituency	10 February 2014	Acquitted and discharged by Sessions Court	Published an article in a Chinese daily, questioned Najib's intention for jailing the former Opposition Leader, Anwar Ibrahim.
Teresa Kok	DAP Member of Parliament for Seputeh constituency	6 May 2014	-	Making a Chinese New Year greeting video posted on YouTube which allegedly included jokes on Malaysia being a dangerous country and on the recent Lahad Datu intrusion.
Abdullah Zaik Abd Rahman	ISMA president	20 June 2014	-	Saying that Chinese migrants brought by the British to Malaya were trespassers.
N. Surendran	PKR Member of Parliament for Padang Serai and one of Anwar Ibrahim's lawyer	19 August 2014	-	Criticising the judgement in the second of Anwar Ibrahim sodomy trials and saying that the proceedings was an attempt to put the Malaysian opposition leader behind bars.
Mohammad Nizar Jamaluddin	PAS Perak state assemblyman for Changkat Jering and former Mentri Besar of Perak	25 August 2014	Charged for criminal defamation (Section 500 Penal Code)	For a speech made in 2012 saying "I was informed that Najib will call all the army generals to do something if BN lost in the general election."
Khalid Abdul Samad	PAS Member of Parliament for Shah Alam constituency	26 August 2014	-	Questioning the executive powers of the Selangor Islamic Religious Department (JAIS)
RSN Rayer	DAP Penang state assemblyman for Seri Delima	27 August 2014	Acquitted and discharged by Sessions Court	Saying "celaka UMNO" (damn UMNO)
Rafizi Ramli	PKR Vice President and MP for Pandan	28 August 2014	Charged for provocation of breach of peace (Section 504 Penal Code)	Accusing UMNO of conspiring to instigate religious strife
Azmi Sharom	Universiti Malaya law professor and columnist for The Star newspaper	2 September 2014	Charge withdrew by Attorney General via discretionary powers	For commenting in a newspaper column about the 2009 Perak constitutional crisis
David Orok	State Reform Party (STAR)'s politician	3 September 2014	-	Accused of insulting Islam and Muhammad on Facebook.
Susan Loone	Malaysiakini journalist	4 September 2014	Arrested 4 September 2014	Publishing an interview with Penang state EXCO Phee Boon Poh in connection with the latter's arrest regarding PPS issue
Safwan Awang	Student activist	5 September 2014	-	Charged and arrested for making seditious remarks in an anti-government rally.
Ali Abd Jalil	Social activist affiliated with Anything But Umno (ABU) movement	8 September 2014	-	Belittling and calling for the abolishment of the Johor state monarchy
Wan Ji Wan Hussin	Islamic preacher affiliated with PAS	10 September 2014	Arrested September 10 2014	Possibly for questioning the role of the rulers as the heads of religion
Wong Hoi Cheng	Unaffiliated project manager	15 September 2014	Charged under Section 504 Penal Code	Describing the Malaysian chief police as the "Heinrich Himmler of Malaysia" on Twitter

== Related charges ==
Former Perak chief minister Mohammad Nizar Jamaluddin was charged for criminal defamation under Section 500 of the Penal Code in August 2014 for a statement made in a speech in 2012 about prime minister Najib Razak. Meanwhile, PKR Vice President Rafizi Ramli was charged for provocation of breach of peace under Section 504 of the Penal Code.
