= 2000 Lunas by-election =

Election in Malaysia

- 29 November 2000

Lunas seat in the Kedah State Legislative Assembly
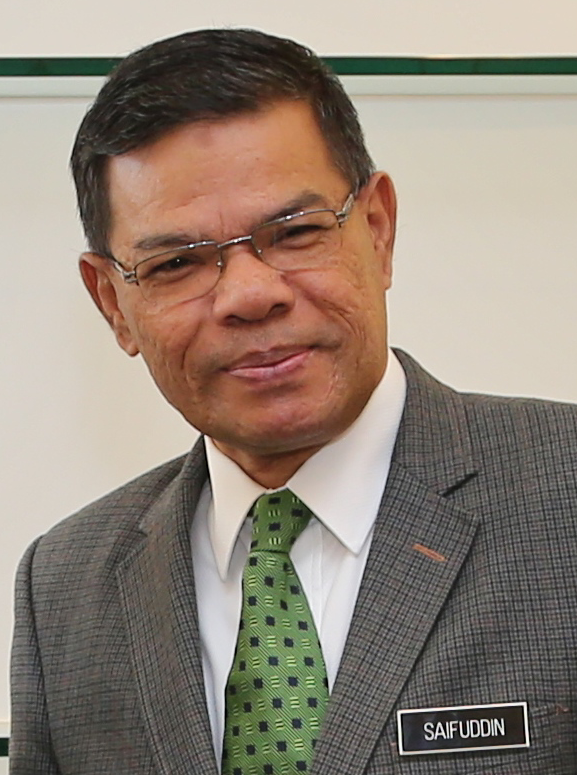
		BN	IND
Candidate	Saifuddin Nasution Ismail	S. Anthonysamy	N. Letchumanan
Party	KeADILan	BN (MIC)	Independent
Alliance	BA
Popular vote	10,511	9,981	50
Percentage	51.17%	48.59%	0.24%
Lunas assemblyman before election
Joe Fernandez
BN (MIC)
Elected Lunas assemblyman
Saifuddin Nasution Ismail
KeADILan

A by-election was held for the Kedah State Assembly seat of Lunas on 29 November 2000 following the nomination day on 21 November 2000. The seat fell vacant after the incumbent assemblyman, Joe Fernandez, the deputy state chief of the Malaysian Indian Congress (MIC), of the ruling Barisan Nasional coalition, was assassinated in Bukit Mertajam on 4 November 2000. He won a 4,700-vote majority by polling 9,760 votes against three candidates: 5,060 votes for M. Kathiravelo of Democratic Action Party (DAP), Ibrahim Mohamed Rashdi (Independent) 2,158 votes and N. Letchumanan (Independent) 87 votes in the general elections in 1999.

S. Anthonysamy of MIC was chosen to be the Barisan Nasional candidate for the by-election, while the opposition Barisan Alternatif coalition chose Saifuddin Nasution Ismail of Parti Keadilan Nasional (KeADILan) as their candidate. The by-election was a three-corner between two of them and independent N. Letchumanan.

The by-election was won by Saifuddin Nasution Ismail with a majority of 530 votes, polling 10,511 votes. A 77.58 percentage turnout of a total 26,746 registered voters came out to vote.

== Results ==
Kedah state by-election, 29 November 2000: Lunas Upon the death of incumbent, M Joseph Philomin Joseph Fernandez
Party	Candidate	Votes	%	∆%
PKR	Saifuddin Nasution Ismail	10,511	51.17	
BN	S. Anthonysamy	9,981	48.59	
Independent	N. Letchumanan	50	0.24	
Total valid votes		20,542	100.00	
Total rejected ballots		204		
Unreturned ballots				
Turnout		20,746	77.57	
Registered electors		26,746		
Majority		530		
PKR gain from BN		Swing	N/A	
