= Azli Yusof =

Malaysian politician

Yang Berhormat Tuan Azli Yusof MP

Member of the Malaysian Parliament for Shah Alam
- Incumbent
- Assumed office 19 November 2022
- Preceded by: Khalid Abdul Samad (PH–AMANAH)
- Majority: 18,095 (2022)

Personal details
- Born: 15 March 1967 (age 59) Sungai Besar, Selangor, Malaysia
- Party: Malaysian Islamic Party (PAS) (1991–2015); National Trust Party (AMANAH) (2015–present)
- Other political affiliations: Angkatan Perpaduan Ummah (APU) (1991–1996); Barisan Alternatif (BA) (1999–2004); Pakatan Rakyat (PR) (2008–2015); Pakatan Harapan (PH) (2015–present)
- Spouse: Noraini Abu Bakar
- Children: 4
- Occupation: Politician
- Website: www.azliyusof.com

Azli bin Yusof (Jawi: name ازلي يوسف; born 15 March 1967) is a Malaysian politician who has served as Member of Parliament (MP) for Shah Alam since November 2022. He served as Political Secretary to former Minister of Federal Territories and Shah Alam MP Khalid Abdul Samad from July 2018 to February 2020, Member of the Kuala Lumpur City Hall (DBKL) Advisory Board from 2018 to 2020, Member of the Shah Alam City Council (MBSA) from 2009 to 2012 and again from 2014 to 2015. He is a member of the National Trust Party (AMANAH), a component party of the Pakatan Harapan (PH) coalition. He has also served as Deputy State Chairman of AMANAH of Selangor since 2019 and Division Chief of AMANAH of Shah Alam since 2016.

During his terms as both DBKL Advisory Board and MBSA Member, Azli involved in various key standing committees including Finance Committee, Engineering and Building Committee, One Stop Centre (OSC) Committee, Internal Audit and Assessment Committee, Smart Cities Committee and Licensing and Enforcement Committee. He also served as Chairman of Residence Representative Council for Zone 1 covering Section 2, 3, 4, 14 and Shah Alam City Centre and Zone 6 covering Section 17, 18 and Padang Jawa.

== Early life ==
Azli was born on 15 May 1967 at Sungai Besar, Selangor. He married Noraini Abu Bakar, a retired teacher in SMK Seksyen 9 Shah Alam, which is last school before retirement, Council Member Mesyuarat Masjid Negeri Selangor and Assistant Secretary of Persatuan Muballighat Negeri Selangor until June 2022.

== Education ==
Azli obtained his BSc in Engineering Management from University of Missouri-Rolla USA (1990), and MBA in Logistics Management from UNISEL (2010).

== Career ==
Azli has over 25 years of global industry experience in project management and industrial design in construction industry and logistics. He is tasked to handle combined projects worth more than RM100 million a year serving as Director of Southeast Asia Region with DEXION ASIA.

=== Community, social and humanitarian involvement ===
Azli was a co-founder of Malaysia Islamic Society of North America (MISNA) in 1990, Azli was appointed as Nazir of Masjid Jamek Tun Raja Uda, Section 16 Shah Alam in 2012, and Imam for Surau At-Taqwa Section 7 Shah Alam. He was also founder and member of Board of Trustees for Sekolah Rendah Islam Pintar, Shah Alam since 1999. He co-founded Muslim Care Malaysia, a borderless humanitarian NGO in 2005 and later in 2014 he co-founded Salam Relief which is also another humanitarian- based NGO. He is actively involved in various domestic humanitarian activities in Shah Alam as well as throughout Selangor and other States. He also participated in international relief missions such as during Tsunami in Acheh, Sumatera and earthquake in Bantul Jogjakarta. He also served as vice president of Kuala Lumpur Football Association (KLFA) since 2019.

== Political career ==
Azli joined the Malaysian Islamic Party (PAS) in 1991 until 2015, he later joined the National Trust Party (AMANAH) since 2015.

== Election results ==
Parliament of Malaysia
Year	Constituency	Candidate	Votes	Pct	Opponent(s)	Votes	Pct	Ballots cast	Majority	Turnout
2022	P108 Shah Alam	Azli Yusof (AMANAH)	61,409	45.93%	Afif Bahardin (BERSATU)	43,314	31.90%	137,082	18,095	81.92%
2022	P108 Shah Alam	Azli Yusof (AMANAH)	61,409	45.93%	Isham Jalil (UMNO)	28,266	20.82%	137,082	18,095	81.92%
2022	P108 Shah Alam	Azli Yusof (AMANAH)	61,409	45.93%	Muhammad Rafique Rashid Ali (PEJUANG)	2,781	2.05%	137,082	18,095	81.92%

== Honours ==
=== Honours of Malaysia ===
- Malaysia
  - Recipient of the 17th Yang di-Pertuan Agong Installation Medal (2024)
