= Shah Alam (federal constituency) =

Federal constituency of Selangor, Malaysia

Shah Alam (P108)
Selangor constituency

Federal constituency
- Legislature: Dewan Rakyat
- MP: Azli Yusof; PH
- Constituency created: 1974
- First contested: 1974
- Last contested: 2022

Demographics
- Population (2020): 438,765
- Electors (2023): 170,590
- Area (km²): 140
- Pop. density (per km²): 3,134

Shah Alam is a federal constituency in Petaling District and Klang District, Selangor, Malaysia, that has been represented in the Dewan Rakyat since 1974.

The federal constituency was created in the 1974 redistribution and is mandated to return a single member to the Dewan Rakyat under the first past the post voting system.

== Demographics ==
Ethnic breakdown of Shah Alam's electorate as of 2018
1. Malay (75.0%)
2. Chinese (12.7%)
3. Indian (11.6%)
4. Other ethnicities (0.70%)
Age breakdown of Shah Alam's electorate as of 2022
1. 18-20 (8.12%)
2. 21-29 (23.6%)
3. 30-39 (22.0%)
4. 40-49 (17.7%)
5. 50-59 (13.5%)
6. 60-69 (10.3%)
7. 70-79 (3.86%)
8. 80-89 (0.71%)
9. above 90 (0.12%)
Gender breakdown of Shah Alam's electorate as of 2022
1. Male (49.9%)
2. Female (50.1%)

== History ==
=== Polling districts ===
According to the gazette issued on 18 July 2023, the Shah Alam constituency has a total of 40 polling districts.

State constituency	Polling districts	Code	Location
Kota Anggerik (N40)	Setia Alam	108/40/01	SMK Setia Alam
Kota Anggerik (N40)	Monterez	108/40/02	SK Puncak Perdana
Kota Anggerik (N40)	Shah Alam S 9	108/40/03	SK Seksyen 9 Shah Alam
Kota Anggerik (N40)	Shah Alam S 8	108/40/04	SK Bandar Anggerik Seksyen 6 Shah Alam
Kota Anggerik (N40)	Shah Alam S 1 & S 7/23 - 7/26	108/40/05	SMK Seksyen 7 Shah Alam
Kota Anggerik (N40)	Shah Alam S 6	108/40/06	SK Seksyen 6 Shah Alam
Kota Anggerik (N40)	Shah Alam S 3	108/40/07	SRA Seksyen 3 Shah Alam
Kota Anggerik (N40)	Shah Alam S 2	108/40/08	SMK Sultan Salahuddin Abdul Aziz Shah Seksyen 2 Shah Alam
Kota Anggerik (N40)	Shah Alam S 4 & S 5	108/40/09	SK Raja Muda (Integrasi) Seksyen 4 Shah Alam
Kota Anggerik (N40)	Shah Alam S 10	108/40/10	SMA Tinggi Tengku Ampuan Jemaah Seksyen 11 Shah Alam
Kota Anggerik (N40)	Shah Alam S11, S12 & S 14	108/40/11	SMK Seksyen Sebelas
Kota Anggerik (N40)	Shah Alam S 15 & S 16	108/40/12	SMK Seksyen 16 Shah Alam
Kota Anggerik (N40)	Mutiara Bukit Raja	108/40/13	Dewan Melati Seksyen 7
Kota Anggerik (N40)	Pangsapuri S7	108/40/14	SK Seksyen 7 Shah Alam
Kota Anggerik (N40)	Bukit Jelutong U8	108/40/15	SK Bukit Jelutong U8 Shah Alam
Kota Anggerik (N40)	Shah Alam S 13	108/40/16	SK Seksyen 13 Shah Alam
Kota Anggerik (N40)	Apartment S16	108/40/17	SK Shah Alam Jalan Dawai Seksyen 16
Kota Anggerik (N40)	Bukit Bandaraya	108/40/18	Dewan MBSA Bukit Bandaraya, Jalan Gunung Nuang U11/3, Seksyen U11 Shah Alam
Kota Anggerik (N40)	Bukit Subang	108/40/19	SK Taman Bukit Subang
Kota Anggerik (N40)	Shah Alam S 7/1 - 7/22	108/40/20	Dewan Melur Seksyen 7
Batu Tiga (N41)	Taman Bukit Tiga	108/41/01	Dewan Serbaguna MBSJ, Subang Jaya
Batu Tiga (N41)	Kampung Kebun Bunga	108/41/02	KAFA Integrasi Fastabiqul Khairat
Batu Tiga (N41)	Pinggiran USJ	108/41/03	Kolej Vokasional Shah Alam (SM Vokasional Shah Alam, Jalan Batu Tiga)
Batu Tiga (N41)	Shah Alam S 20 - S 23	108/40/04	SK Seksyen 20 Shah Alam
Batu Tiga (N41)	Shah Alam S 19/15 - 19/31	108/40/05	SRA Integrasi Seksyen 19
Batu Tiga (N41)	Shah Alam S 19/1 - S 19/14	108/40/06	SK Seksyen 19
Batu Tiga (N41)	Shah Alam S 24/1 - 24/38	108/41/07	SK Seksyen 24
Batu Tiga (N41)	Apartment S24	108/40/08	Kolej Tingkatan 6, Jalan Timun 24/1
Batu Tiga (N41)	Shah Alam S 17 Timur	108/41/09	SK Seksyen 17 Shah Alam
Batu Tiga (N41)	Padang Jawa	108/41/10	SK Padang Jawa Klang
Batu Tiga (N41)	Sungai Rasau	108/41/11	SJK (C) Taman Rashna Klang
Batu Tiga (N41)	Kampung Kuantan	108/41/12	SMK Sultan Abdul Samad Jalan Landasan Bukit Kuda Klang
Batu Tiga (N41)	Taman Kampung Kuantan	108/41/13	SK Bukit Kuda Jalan Landasan Klang
Batu Tiga (N41)	Shah Alam S 17 Barat	108/41/14	SM Pendidikan Khas Vokasional Seksyen 17 Shah Alam
Batu Tiga (N41)	Rimba Jaya	108/41/15	SRA Padang Jawa Klang
Batu Tiga (N41)	Shah Alam S 19/32 - 19/50	108/41/16	SMK Seksyen 19
Batu Tiga (N41)	Shah Alam S 24	108/41/17	SMK Seksyen 24 (2) Shah Alam
Batu Tiga (N41)	Shah Alam S 18 Barat 1	108/41/18	SK Seksyen 18 Shah Alam
Batu Tiga (N41)	Shah Alan S 18 Timur	108/41/19	SMK Seksyen 18 Shah Alam
Batu Tiga (N41)	Shah Alam S 18 Barat 2	108/41/20	SK Pendidikan Khas Selangor

=== Representation history ===
Members of Parliament for Shah Alam
Parliament	No	Years	Member	Party	Vote Share
Constituency created from Klang, Damansara and Rawang
4th	P080	1974–1978	Lew Sip Hon (刘集汉)	BN (MCA)	17,882; 61.72%
5th	P080	1978–1982	Lew Sip Hon (刘集汉)	BN (MCA)	29,098; 57.74%
6th	P080	1982–1986	Lew Sip Hon (刘集汉)	BN (MCA)	47,020; 66.07%
7th	P092	1986–1990	Rahmah Othman (رحمة عثمان)	BN (UMNO)	32,714; 80.59%
8th	P092	1990–1995	Rakibah Abdul Manap (رقيبة عبدالمناڤ)	BN (UMNO)	41,767; 62.44%
9th	P098	1995–1999	Salamon Selamat (سلامون سلامت)	BN (UMNO)	50.966; 83.25%
10th	P098	1999–2004	Mohd Zin Mohamed (محمد زين محمد)	BN (UMNO)	35,851; 51.02%
11th	P108	2004–2008	Abdul Aziz Shamsuddin (عبدالعزيز شمس الدين)	BN (UMNO)	32,417; 63.04%
12th	P108	2008–2013	Khalid Abdul Samad (خالد عبدالصمد)	PR (PAS)	33,356; 58.11%
13th	P108	2013–2015	Khalid Abdul Samad (خالد عبدالصمد)	PR (PAS)	49,009; 56.28%
13th	P108	2015–2018	Khalid Abdul Samad (خالد عبدالصمد)	AMANAH	49,009; 56.28%
14th	P108	2018–2022	Khalid Abdul Samad (خالد عبدالصمد)	PH (AMANAH)	55,949; 60.00%
15th	P108	2022–present	Azli Yusof (أزلي يوسف)	PH (AMANAH)	51,409; 45.23%

=== State constituency ===
Parliamentary constituency	State constituency						
Parliamentary constituency	1955–59*	1959–1974	1974–1986	1986–1995	1995–2004	2004–2018	2018–present
Shah Alam			Bandar Kelang				
Shah Alam				Batu Tiga			
Shah Alam			Bukit Raja				
Shah Alam			Kampong Jawa				
Shah Alam						Kota Anggerik	
Shah Alam					Kota Raja		
Shah Alam				Shahbandar Raya			
Shah Alam				Subang			
Shah Alam					Sungai Renggam		

=== Historical boundaries ===
State Constituency	Area				
State Constituency	1974	1984	1994	2003	2018
Bandar Kelang	Jalan Kapar; Jalan Meru; Klang; Taman Bunga Melor; Teluk Pulai				
Batu Tiga		Bukit Lanchong; Bukit Raja; Seksyen 1 - 24, 26 - 28 Shah Alam; Taman Bukit Kuda; U2, 7 - 8, 12 Shah Alam	Cahaya Alam; Persiaran Raja Muda; Persiaran Selangor; Seksyen 1 - 12, 14 - 15 Shah Alam; U12 Shah Alam	Seksyen 16 - 17, 19 - 24, 26 Shah Alam; Sungai Rasah; Taman Bukit Kuda; Taman Pinggiran USJ; USJ Heights	Seksyen 16 - 21 Shah Alam; Sungai Rasah; Taman Bukit Kuda; Taman Pinggiran USJ; USJ Heights
Bukit Raja	Bukit Lanchong; Bukit Raja; Ladang Effingham; Ladang Seafield; Shah Alam				
Kampong Jawa	Batu Nilam; Jalan Kebun; Johan Setia; Kampung Jawa; Klang Jaya				
Kota Anggerik				Bukit Jelutong; Bukit Raja; Setia Alam; Seksyen 1 - 15, 18 Shah Alam; U2, 7, 9 - 11, 16 Shah Alam	Bukit Jelutong; Puncak Perdana; Setia Alam; Seksyen 1 - 15 Shah Alam; U9 - 11, 16 Shah Alam
Kota Raja			Johan Setia; Seksyen 25, 29 - 36 Shah Alam; Sentosa; Sri Andalas; Taman Klang Jaya		
Shahbandar Raya		Bukit Tinggi; Johan Setia; Seksyen 25, 29 - 36 Shah Alam; Sri Andalas; Taman Klang Jaya			
Subang		Meru; Setia Alam; SS6 - 7, 11; Tropicana; U1 - 7, 9 - 11 Shah Alam			
Sungai Renggam			Bukit Raja; Seksyen 16 - 24, 26 - 28 Shah Alam; Putra Heights; Taman Bukit Kuda; Taman Pinggiran USJ		

=== Current state assembly members ===
No.	State Constituency	Member	Coalition (Party)
N40	Kota Anggerik	Najwan Halimi	PH (PKR)
N41	Batu Tiga	Danial Al Rashid Haron Aminar Rashid	PH (AMANAH)

=== Local governments & postcodes ===
No.	State Constituency	Local Government	Postcode
N40	Kota Anggerik	Shah Alam City Council; Klang City Council (Bukit Raja area)	40000, 40100, 40150, 40160, 40170, 40200, 40300, 40400, 40450, 40500, 40502, 40503, 40520, 40680 Shah Alam; 41050, 41300 Klang
N41	Batu Tiga	Shah Alam City Council; Subang Jaya City Council (Pinggiran USJ and Batu Tiga areas); Klang City Council (Sungai Rasau and Padang Jawa areas)	40000, 40100, 40150, 40160, 40170, 40200, 40300, 40400, 40450, 40500, 40502, 40503, 40520, 40680 Shah Alam; 41050, 41300 Klang

== Election results ==
Malaysian general election, 2022
Party	Candidate	Votes	%	∆%
PH	Azli Yusof	61,409	45.23	▼14.77
PN	Afif Bahardin	43,314	31.90	▲31.90
BN	Hizatul Isham Abdul Jalil	28,266	20.82	▼2.88
GTA	Muhammad Rafique Rashid Ali	2,781	2.05	▲2.05
Total valid votes		135,770	100.00	
Total rejected ballots		919		
Unreturned ballots		393		
Turnout		137,082	82.71	▼5.12
Registered electors		165,744		
Majority		18,095	13.33	▼22.97
PH hold		Swing		
Source(s) https://lom.agc.gov.my/ilims/upload/portal/akta/outputp/1753283/PUB612.pdf

Malaysian general election, 2018
Party	Candidate	Votes	%	∆%
PH	Khalid Abdul Samad	55,949	60.00	▲60.00
BN	Azhari Shaari	22,100	23.70	▼20.02
PAS	Mohd Zuhdi Marsuki	15,194	16.30	▼39.98
Total valid votes		93,243	100.00	
Total rejected ballots		664		
Unreturned ballots		334		
Turnout		94,241	87.82	▼0.35
Registered electors		107,316		
Majority		33,849	36.30	▲23.74
PH gain from PAS		Swing		?
Source(s) "His Majesty's Government Gazette - Notice of Contested Election, Parliament for the State of Selangor [P.U. (B) 239/2018]" (PDF). Attorney General's Chambers of Malaysia. 3 May 2018. Archived from the original (PDF) on 2019-07-19. "Federal Government Gazette - Results of Contested Election and Statements of the Poll after the Official Addition of Votes, Parliamentary Constituencies for the State of Selangor [P.U. (B) 313/2018]" (PDF). Attorney General's Chambers of Malaysia. 28 May 2018. Archived from the original (PDF) on 2019-07-19.

Malaysian general election, 2013
Party	Candidate	Votes	%	∆%
PAS	Khalid Abdul Samad	49,009	56.28	▼1.83
BN	Zulkifli Noordin	38,070	43.72	▲1.83
Total valid votes		87,079	100.00	
Total rejected ballots		863		
Unreturned ballots		186		
Turnout		88,128	88.17	▲10.70
Registered electors		99,957		
Majority		10,939	12.56	▼3.66
PAS hold		Swing		
Source(s) "Federal Government Gazette - Notice of Contested Election, Parliament for the State of Selangor [P.U. (B) 176/2013]" (PDF). Attorney General's Chambers of Malaysia. 26 April 2013. Archived from the original (PDF) on 2018-09-30. "Federal Government Gazette - Results of Contested Election and Statements of the Poll after the Official Addition of Votes, Parliamentary Constituencies for the State of Selangor [P.U. (B) 217/2013]" (PDF). Attorney General's Chambers of Malaysia. 22 May 2013. Archived from the original (PDF) on 2018-09-30.

Malaysian general election, 2008
Party	Candidate	Votes	%	∆%
PAS	Khalid Abdul Samad	33,356	58.11	▲21.15
BN	Abdul Aziz Shamsuddin	24,042	41.89	▼21.15
Total valid votes		57,398	100.00	
Total rejected ballots		749		
Unreturned ballots		214		
Turnout		58,361	77.47	▲1.81
Registered electors		75,334		
Majority		9,314	16.22	▼9.86
PAS gain from BN		Swing		?

Malaysian general election, 2004
Party	Candidate	Votes	%	∆%
BN	Abdul Aziz Shamsuddin	32,417	63.04	▲12.02
PAS	Khalid Abdul Samad	19,007	36.96	▲36.96
Total valid votes		51,424	100.00	
Total rejected ballots		699		
Unreturned ballots		213		
Turnout		52,336	75.66	▼2.01
Registered electors		69,170		
Majority		13,410	26.08	▲24.04
BN hold		Swing		

Malaysian general election, 1999
Party	Candidate	Votes	%	∆%
BN	Mohd Zin Mohamed	35,851	51.02	▼32.33
PKR	Mohamad Ezam Mohd Nor	34,411	48.98	▲48.98
Total valid votes		70,262	100.00	
Total rejected ballots		994		
Unreturned ballots		221		
Turnout		71,477	77.07	▲3.04
Registered electors		92,737		
Majority		1,440	2.04	▼64.46
BN hold		Swing		

Malaysian general election, 1995
Party	Candidate	Votes	%	∆%
BN	Salamon Selamat	50,966	83.25	▲20.81
S46	Hussein Ahmad	10,251	16.75	▼20.81
Total valid votes		61,217	100.00	
Total rejected ballots		1,552		
Unreturned ballots		305		
Turnout		63,074	74.03	▼2.06
Registered electors		85,202		
Majority		40,715	66.50	▲41.62
BN hold		Swing		

Malaysian general election, 1990
Party	Candidate	Votes	%	∆%
BN	Rakibah Abdul Manap	41,767	62.44	▼18.15
S46	Rahmah Othman	25,129	37.56	▲37.56
Total valid votes		66,896	100.00	
Total rejected ballots		1,773		
Unreturned ballots		0		
Turnout		68,669	76.09	▲6.47
Registered electors		90,248		
Majority		16,638	24.88	▼36.30
BN hold		Swing		

Malaysian general election, 1986
Party	Candidate	Votes	%	∆%
BN	Rahmah Othman	32,714	80.59	▲14.52
PAS	Mustafar Ab Kadir	7,879	19.41	▲19.41
Total valid votes		40,593	100.00	
Total rejected ballots		1,428		
Unreturned ballots		0		
Turnout		42,021	69.62	▼2.55
Registered electors		60,360		
Majority		24,835	61.18	▲29.04
BN hold		Swing		

Malaysian general election, 1982
Party	Candidate	Votes	%	∆%
BN	Lew Sip Hon	47,020	66.07	▲8.33
DAP	Wee Sin Chuan @ Gwee Sin Chuan	24,148	33.93	▼4.63
Total valid votes		71,168	100.00	
Total rejected ballots		1,865		
Unreturned ballots		0		
Turnout		73,033	72.17	▲0.10
Registered electors		101,192		
Majority		22,872	32.14	▲12.96
BN hold		Swing		

Malaysian general election, 1978
Party	Candidate	Votes	%	∆%
BN	Lew Sip Hon	29,098	57.74	▼3.98
DAP	Liew Fatt Yuen	19,434	38.56	▲10.28
PEKEMAS	J. P. Samuel Raj	1,862	3.69	▼6.31
Total valid votes		50,394	100.00	
Total rejected ballots		1,059		
Unreturned ballots		0		
Turnout		51,453	72.07	▼1.85
Registered electors		71,398		
Majority		9,664	19.18	▼14.26
BN hold		Swing		

Malaysian general election, 1974
Party	Candidate	Votes	%
BN	Lew Sip Hon	17,882	61.72
DAP	K. Ramasen	8,192	28.28
PEKEMAS	J. P. Samuel Raj	2,898	10.00
Total valid votes		28,972	100.00
Total rejected ballots		1,508	
Unreturned ballots		0	
Turnout		30,480	73.92
Registered electors		41,231	
Majority		9,690	33.44
This was a new constituency created.
