= Abdul Aziz Sheikh Fadzir =

Malaysian politician and businessman

Yang Berbahagia Dato' Abdul Aziz Sheikh Fadzir DSDK DSNS

Member of the Malaysian Parliament for Kulim–Bandar Baharu
- In office 5 May 2013 – 9 May 2018
- Preceded by: Zulkifli Noordin (PR–PKR)
- Succeeded by: Saifuddin Nasution Ismail (PH–PKR)
- Majority: 1,871 (2013)

Member of the Kedah State Legislative Assembly for Kuala Ketil
- In office 21 March 2004 – 8 March 2008
- Preceded by: Mohd Hadzir Ismail (BN–UMNO)
- Succeeded by: Md Zuki Yusof (PR–PAS)
- Majority: 462 (2004)

Independent and Non-Executive Director of the Destini Berhad
- Incumbent
- Assumed office 5 July 2023
- In office 30 August 2017 – 18 May 2018

Chairman of the TH Heavy Engineering Berhad
- In office 25 May 2021 – 23 March 2022

Personal details
- Born: Abdul Aziz bin Sheikh Fadzir; 28 April 1963 (age 63) Kedah, Federation of Malaya (now Malaysia)
- Citizenship: Malaysian
- Party: United Malays National Organisation (UMNO)
- Other political affiliations: Barisan Nasional (BN)
- Relations: Abdul Kadir Sheikh Fadzir (elder brother)
- Occupation: Politician; businessman
- Abdul Aziz Sheikh Fadzir on Facebook

Dato' Abdul Aziz bin Sheikh Fadzir (born 28 April 1963) is a Malaysian politician and businessman who has served as the Independent and Non-Executive Director of the Destini Berhad since July 2023 and from August 2017 to May 2018. He served as the Member of Parliament (MP) for Kulim–Bandar Baharu from May 2013 to May 2018 and Member of the Kedah State Legislative Assembly (MLA) for Kuala Ketil from March 2004 to March 2008. He is a member and was the Vice Youth Chief of the United Malays National Organisation (UMNO), a component party of the Barisan Nasional (BN) coalition. He is also the younger brother of former Cabinet minister and former Kulim-Bandar Baharu MP Abdul Kadir Sheikh Fadzir.

Besides politics, Abdul Aziz also held various leadership roles of many institutions, companies and agencies. They are the Universiti Utara Malaysia, Perbadanan Kemajuan Ekonomi Negeri Kedah, Tourism Malaysia, Priceworth International Berhad, TH Heavy Engineering Berhad, Rangkaian Seri Hotel Malaysia, Utusan (Melayu) Malaysia Berhad, Safeguard Corp Berhad, Kretam Holdings Berhad and Gold Bridge Engineering and Construction Berhad.

== Political career ==
=== Member of the Kedah State Legislative Assembly (2004–2008) ===
In the 2004 Kedah state election, Abdul Aziz made his electoral debut after being nominated by BN to contest for the Kuala Ketil state seat. He won the seat and was elected to the Kedah State Legislative Assembly as the Kuala Ketil MLA by a majority of 462 votes.

=== Member of Parliament (2013–2018) ===
In the 2008 general election, Abdul Aziz moved to the federal politics after being renominated by BN to contest for the Kulim-Bandar Baharu federal seat, he lost to Zulkifli Noordin of the Pakatan Rakyat (PR) by a minority of 5,583 votes amid a large swing to the opposition in Kedah.

In the 2013 general election, Abdul Aziz was renominated by BN to contest for the seat, he defeated Saifuddin Nasution Ismail of PR and was elected to the Parliament as the Kulim-Bandar Baharu MP by a majority of 1,871 votes.

In the 2018 general election, Abdul Aziz was renominated by BN to defend the seat, he lost the seat to Saifuddin of Pakatan Harapan (PH) by a minority of 4,860 votes.

== Personal life ==
Abdul Aziz was declared bankrupt in 2014. He assured that he would settle his debts to avoid his seat being declared vacant and triggering a by-election.

== Election results ==
Kedah State Legislative Assembly
Year	Constituency	Candidate	Votes	Pct	Opponent(s)	Votes	Pct	Ballots cast	Majority	Turnout
2004	N32 Kuala Ketil	Abd Aziz Sheikh Fadzir (UMNO)	9,323	50.47%	Md Zuki Yusof (PAS)	8,861	47.97%	18,473	462	82.26%

Parliament of Malaysia
Year	Constituency	Candidate	Votes	Pct	Opponent(s)	Votes	Pct	Ballots cast	Majority	Turnout
2008	P018 Kulim–Bandar Baharu	Abd Aziz Sheikh Fadzir (UMNO)	16,672	42.83%	Zulkifli Noordin (PKR)	22,255	57.17%	40,182	5,583	77.28%
2013	P018 Kulim–Bandar Baharu	Abd Aziz Sheikh Fadzir (UMNO)	26,782	51.81%	Saifuddin Nasution Ismail (PKR)	24,911	48.19%	52,766	1,871	86.63%
2018	P018 Kulim–Bandar Baharu	Abd Aziz Sheikh Fadzir (UMNO)	18,299	33.67%	Saifuddin Nasution Ismail (PKR)	23,159	42.62%	55,390	4,860	83.18%
2018	P018 Kulim–Bandar Baharu	Abd Aziz Sheikh Fadzir (UMNO)	18,299	33.67%	Hassan Abdul Razak (PAS)	12,885	23.71%	55,390	4,860	83.18%

== Honours ==
- Kedah
  - Knight Companion of the Order of Loyalty to the Royal House of Kedah (DSDK) – Dato' (2014)
- Negeri Sembilan
  - Knight Companion of the Order of Loyalty to Negeri Sembilan (DSNS) – Dato' (1999)

== See also ==
- Kulim-Bandar Baharu (federal constituency)
