= Fahmi Zainol =

Malaysian politician

Yang Berhormat Tuan Fahmi Zainol MLA
- فهمي زينول
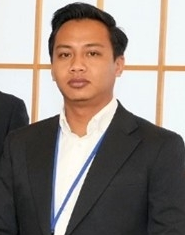
- Fahmi Zainol in 2024

Member of the Penang State Executive Council
- In office 16 August 2023 – 4 March 2026
- Governor: Ahmad Fuzi Abdul Razak (2023–2025); Ramli Ngah Talib (2025–2026)
- Chief Minister: Chow Kon Yeow
- Portfolio: Agrotechnology, Food Security, and Cooperative Development
- Preceded by: Norlela Ariffin (Agrotechnology and Food Security); Ahmad Zakiyuddin Abdul Rahman (Cooperative)
- Succeeded by: Rashidi Zinol (Agrotechnology and Food Security); Mohamad Abdul Hamid (Cooperative Development)
- Constituency: Pantai Jerejak

Member of the Penang State Legislative Assembly for Pantai Jerejak
- Incumbent
- Assumed office 12 August 2023
- Preceded by: Saifuddin Nasution Ismail (PH–PKR)
- Majority: 8,597 (2023)

State Vice Chairman of the People's Justice Party of Penang
- Incumbent
- Assumed office 2023 Serving with Goh Choon Aik & Kumaresan Aramugam & Muhammad Fadzli Roslan & Nurhidayah Che Rose
- President: Anwar Ibrahim
- State Chairwoman: Nurul Izzah Anwar

Personal details
- Born: Fahmi bin Zainol; 1991 (age 34–35) Malaysia
- Citizenship: Malaysia
- Party: People's Justice Party (PKR)
- Other political affiliations: Pakatan Harapan (PH)
- Spouse: Nur Hidayah Abd Jabar
- Children: 3
- Education: Universiti Malaya
- Occupation: Politician

Fahmi bin Zainol (born 1991) is a Malaysian politician who has served as a Member of the Penang State Executive Council (EXCO) in the Pakatan Harapan (PH) state administration under Chief Minister Chow Kon Yeow from August 2023 till March 2026. Currently he served as Member of the Penang State Legislative Assembly (MLA) for Pantai Jerejak since August 2023. He is a member of the People's Justice Party (PKR), a component party of the PH coalition.

== Political career ==
Fahmi is a student activist and was the President of the Students' Council at the Universiti Malaya in 2013 before entering politics. He joined PKR on 3 November 2015 and was appointed Chairman of the Student Bureau in the Youth Wing. In 2018, he was chosen as the Election Director for the Youth Wing. In the same year, he was elected as the Chief of the PKR Youth Wing of Penang state and Permatang Pauh Division. In 2022, he competed against Adam Adli for the Chief of PKR Youth Wing but lost. However, he was elected to the PKR central committee and was re-elected as the Chief of the PKR Youth Wing of Penang state and Permatang Pauh Division.

On 1 March 2026, his position inside the party after were suspended followed by his EXCO position five days later. This is due to ongoing court cases involving accusation of him beating his wife.

== Controversies ==
On 27 February 2026, he was accused of beating his wife at their resident on 22 February 2026.

== Election results ==
Penang State Legislative Assembly
Year	Constituency	Candidate	Votes	Pct.	Opponent(s)	Votes	Pct.	Ballots cast	Majority	Turnout
2023	N36 Pantai Jerejak	Fahmi Zainol (PKR)	14,116	69.93%	Oh Tong Keong (GERAKAN)	5,519	27.34%	20,334	8,597	68.03%
2023	N36 Pantai Jerejak	Fahmi Zainol (PKR)	14,116	69.93%	Priyankaa Loh Siang Pin (MUDA)	476	2.36%	20,334	8,597	68.03%
2023	N36 Pantai Jerejak	Fahmi Zainol (PKR)	14,116	69.93%	Ravinder Singh (PRM)	76	0.38%	20,334	8,597	68.03%
