= Oh Tong Keong =

Malaysian politician

Oh Tong Keong PKT
- 胡栋强

Deputy President of Parti Gerakan Rakyat Malaysia
- Incumbent
- Assumed office 17 November 2018
- President: Dominic Lau Hoe Chai
- Preceded by: Dominic Lau Hoe Chai

Personal details
- Born: Oh Tong Keong; 24 June 1968 (age 58) Penang, Malaysia
- Citizenship: Malaysia
- Party: Parti Gerakan Rakyat Malaysia (Gerakan)
- Other political affiliations: Barisan Nasional (BN) (until 2018); Perikatan Nasional (PN) (since 2021)
- Occupation: Politician

Oh Tong Keong is a Malaysian politician who has served as Deputy President of Parti Gerakan Rakyat Malaysia (Gerakan) since November 2018. He won the Gerakan deputy presidency in the party elections in 2018, replacing Dominic Lau Hoe Chai who won the party presidency. He was reelected to the position in 2023. He is a member of GERAKAN, a component party of the Perikatan Nasional (PN) and formerly Barisan Nasional (BN) coalitions.

== Election results ==
Penang State Legislative Assembly
| Year | Constituency | Candidate | Votes | Pct | Opponent(s) | Votes | Pct | Ballots cast | Majority | Turnout |
|---|---|---|---|---|---|---|---|---|---|---|
| 2013 | N26 Padang Kota | Oh Tong Keong (Gerakan) | 2,367 | 19.84% | Chow Kon Yeow (DAP) | 9,563 | 80.16% | 12,077 | 7,196 | 78.55% |
| 2018 | N36 Pantai Jerejak | Oh Tong Keong (Gerakan) | 3,298 | 17.29% | Saifuddin Nasution Ismail (PKR) | 14,014 | 73.45% | 19,315 | 10,716 | 81.68% |
| 2018 | N36 Pantai Jerejak | Oh Tong Keong (Gerakan) | 3,298 | 17.29% | Mohd Farhan Yusri (PAS) | 1,670 | 8.75% | 19,315 | 10,716 | 81.68% |
| 2018 | N36 Pantai Jerejak | Oh Tong Keong (Gerakan) | 3,298 | 17.29% | Yim Boon Leong (MUP) | 97 | 0.51% | 19,315 | 10,716 | 81.68% |
| 2023 | N36 Pantai Jerejak | Oh Tong Keong (Gerakan) | 5,519 | 27.34% | Fahmi Zainol (PKR) | 14,116 | 69.93% | 20,297 | 8,597 | 67.91% |
| 2023 | N36 Pantai Jerejak | Oh Tong Keong (Gerakan) | 5,519 | 27.34% | Priyankaa Loh Siang Pin (MUDA) | 476 | 2.36% | 20,297 | 8,597 | 67.91% |
| 2023 | N36 Pantai Jerejak | Oh Tong Keong (Gerakan) | 5,519 | 27.34% | Ravinder Singh (PRM) | 76 | 0.38% | 20,297 | 8,597 | 67.91% |

Parliament of Malaysia
| Year | Constituency | Candidate | Votes | Pct | Opponent(s) | Votes | Pct | Ballots cast | Majority | Turnout |
|---|---|---|---|---|---|---|---|---|---|---|
| 2022 | P052 Bayan Baru | Oh Tong Keong (Gerakan) | 20,307 | 22.64% | Sim Tze Tzin (PKR) | 55,209 | 61.54% | 91,217 | 34,902 | 79.63% |
| 2022 | P052 Bayan Baru | Oh Tong Keong (Gerakan) | 20,307 | 22.64% | Saw Yee Fung (MCA) | 13,377 | 14.91% | 91,217 | 34,902 | 79.63% |
| 2022 | P052 Bayan Baru | Oh Tong Keong (Gerakan) | 20,307 | 22.64% | Ooi Chuan Aun (WARISAN) | 440 | 0.49% | 91,217 | 34,902 | 79.63% |
| 2022 | P052 Bayan Baru | Oh Tong Keong (Gerakan) | 20,307 | 22.64% | Ravinder Singh (PRM) | 251 | 0.28% | 91,217 | 34,902 | 79.63% |
| 2022 | P052 Bayan Baru | Oh Tong Keong (Gerakan) | 20,307 | 22.64% | Kan Chee Yuen (IND) | 124 | 0.14% | 91,217 | 34,902 | 79.63% |

== Honours ==
- Penang
  - Recipient of the Distinguished Conduct Medal (PKT) (2005)
