= Saifuddin Nasution Ismail =

Malaysian politician

Yang Berhormat Senator Datuk Seri Panglima Saifuddin Nasution Ismail SJMK SPDK DGSM DSDK
- سيف الدين ناسوتيون إسماعيل
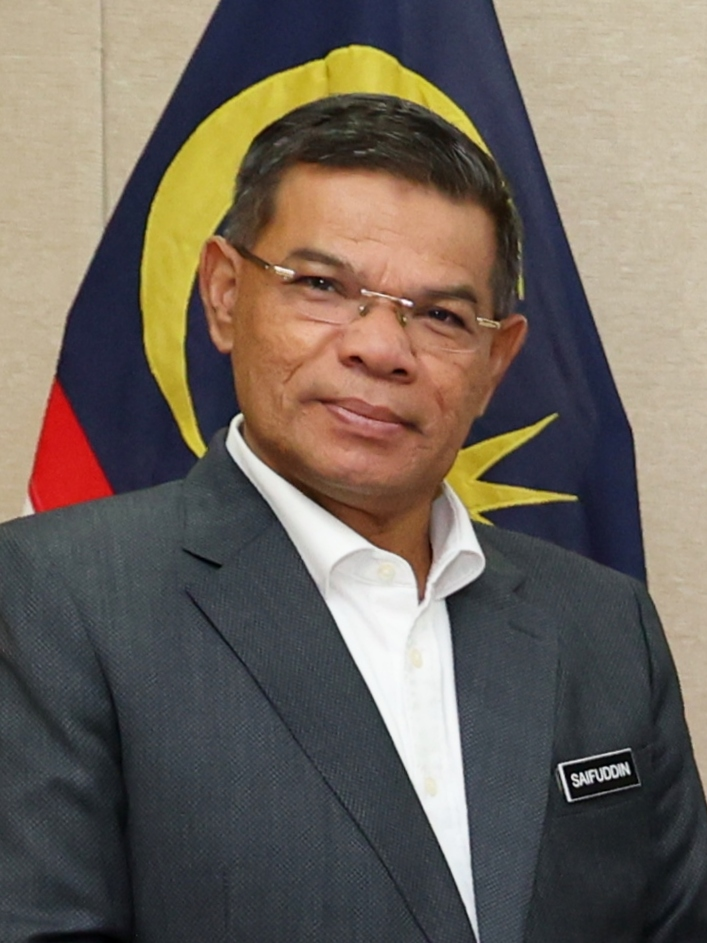
- Saifuddin in 2023

Minister of Home Affairs
- Incumbent
- Assumed office 3 December 2022
- Monarchs: Abdullah (2022–2024); Ibrahim (since 2024)
- Prime Minister: Anwar Ibrahim
- Deputy: Shamsul Anuar Nasarah
- Preceded by: Hamzah Zainudin
- Constituency: Senator

Minister of Domestic Trade and Consumer Affairs
- In office 2 July 2018 – 24 February 2020
- Monarchs: Muhammad V (2018–2019); Abdullah (2019–2020)
- Prime Minister: Mahathir Mohamad
- Deputy: Chong Chieng Jen
- Preceded by: Hamzah Zainudin (Minister of Domestic Trade, Cooperatives and Consumerism)
- Succeeded by: Alexander Nanta Linggi
- Constituency: Kulim-Bandar Baharu

Deputy President of the People's Justice Party
- Acting
- Assumed office 16 August 2026
- President: Anwar Ibrahim

Vice President of the People's Justice Party
- Incumbent
- Assumed office 6 June 2026 Serving with Amirudin Shari, Aminuddin Harun, Chang Lih Kang, Ramanan Ramakrishnan & Zaliha Mustafa
- President: Anwar Ibrahim

Advisor of the Management Committee of the People's Justice Party
- Incumbent
- Assumed office 15 September 2024
- President: Anwar Ibrahim
- Preceded by: Position established

Secretary-General of the People's Justice Party
- In office 25 November 2016 – 15 September 2024
- President: Wan Azizah Wan Ismail (2016–2018); Anwar Ibrahim (2018–2024)
- Preceded by: Rafizi Ramli
- Succeeded by: Fuziah Salleh
- In office 31 January 2010 – 13 October 2014
- President: Wan Azizah Wan Ismail
- Preceded by: Salehuddin Hashim
- Succeeded by: Rafizi Ramli

Secretary-General of Pakatan Harapan
- Incumbent
- Assumed office 1 March 2020
- President: Wan Azizah Wan Ismail
- Chairman: Anwar Ibrahim
- Preceded by: Saifuddin Abdullah

State Chairman of Pakatan Harapan of Kedah
- Incumbent
- Assumed office 7 February 2025
- President: Wan Azizah Wan Ismail
- National Chairman: Anwar Ibrahim
- Preceded by: Mahfuz Omar

Senator Appointed by the Yang di-Pertuan Agong
- Incumbent
- Assumed office 3 December 2022
- Monarchs: Abdullah (2022–2024); Ibrahim (since 2024)
- Prime Minister: Anwar Ibrahim

Member of the Malaysian Parliament for Kulim-Bandar Baharu
- In office 9 May 2018 – 19 November 2022
- Preceded by: Abdul Aziz Sheikh Fadzir (BN–UMNO)
- Succeeded by: Roslan Hashim (PN–BERSATU)
- Majority: 4,860 (2018)

Member of the Malaysian Parliament for Machang
- In office 8 March 2008 – 5 May 2013
- Preceded by: Sazmi Miah (BN–UMNO)
- Succeeded by: Ahmad Jazlan Yaakub (BN–UMNO)
- Majority: 1,460 (2008)

Member of the Penang State Legislative Assembly for Pantai Jerejak
- In office 9 May 2018 – 12 August 2023
- Preceded by: Mohd Rashid Hasnon (PH–PKR)
- Succeeded by: Fahmi Zainol (PH–PKR)
- Majority: 10,716 (2018)

Member of the Kedah State Legislative Assembly for Lunas
- In office 29 November 2000 – 21 March 2004
- Preceded by: Joe Fernandez (BN–MIC)
- Succeeded by: Ganesan Subramaniam (BN–MIC)
- Majority: 530 (2000)

Personal details
- Born: Saifuddin Nasution bin Ismail; 7 December 1963 (age 62) State of Singapore, Malaysia
- Citizenship: Malaysia
- Party: United Malays National Organisation (UMNO) (1989–1999); National Justice Party (keADILan) (1999–2003); People's Justice Party (PKR) (2003–present)
- Other political affiliations: Barisan Nasional (BN) (1989–1999); Barisan Alternatif (BA) (1999–2004); Pakatan Rakyat (PR) (2008–2015); Pakatan Harapan (PH) (2015–present)
- Spouse: Norhayati Musa
- Children: 4
- Education: Universiti Pertanian Malaysia (BSc); Tunku Abdul Rahman University College (MA)
- Occupation: Politician
- Saifuddin Nasution Ismail on Facebook; Saifuddin Nasution Ismail on Parliament of Malaysia

Saifuddin Nasution bin Ismail (Jawi: سيف الدين ناسوتيون بن اسماعيل; born 7 December 1963) is a Malaysian politician who has served as the Minister of Home Affairs in the Unity Government administration under Prime Minister Anwar Ibrahim and as a Senator since December 2022. He served as the Minister of Domestic Trade and Consumer Affairs in the PH administration under former Prime Minister Mahathir Mohamad from July 2018 to the collapse of the PH administration in February 2020, Member of Parliament (MP) for Kulim-Bandar Baharu from May 2018 to November 2022 and for Machang from March 2008 to May 2013 as well as Member of the Penang State Legislative Assembly (MLA) for Pantai Jerejak from May 2018 to August 2023 and Kedah MLA for Lunas from November 2000 to March 2004. He is a member of the People's Justice Party (PKR), a component party of the PH coalition. He has also served as the Chief Secretary of PH since March 2020, State Chairman of PH of Kedah since February 2025, Acting Deputy President of PKR since August 2026, Vice President of PKR since June 2026 and Advisor of the Management Committee of PKR since September 2024. He previously served as the Secretary-General of PKR from January 2010 to his resignation in October 2014 and again from November 2016 to September 2024.

== Early life and education ==
Saifuddin Nasution bin Ismail was born in State of Singapore, Malaysia on 7 December 1963. The surname Nasution can be linked to the lineage of Batak Mandailing in North Sumatra, Indonesia.

Saifuddin Nasution received his Bachelor of Science (BSc) in Agriculture from Universiti Pertanian Malaysia (UPM) in 1987.

== Political career ==
Saifuddin was initially a member of UMNO Youth wing of the ruling party but was expelled in 1999 as its assistant secretary. An ally of Anwar Ibrahim, Saifuddin then defected to the opposition KeADILan party, which later became PKR.

Saifuddin election debut was in the 1999 general election contesting the seat of Padang Serai, Kedah for PKR but lost. A year later, he won the Kedah State Assembly seat of Lunas in a 2000 by-election. However, he failed in his bid to be elevated to the federal Parliament in the 2004 election, losing to Lim Bee Kau of the Barisan Nasional in the seat of Padang Serai again. In the 2008 election, Saifuddin contested and won the federal seat of Machang in Kelantan. For the 2013 election, he returned to Kedah to contest the seat of Kulim-Bandar Baharu, but was defeated by UMNO's Abdul Aziz Sheikh Fadzir. Fortunately in the 2018 general election, Saifuddin made a comeback to win both the Kulim-Bandar Baharu parliamentary seat and Pantai Jerejak, Penang state seat but lost his parliamentary seat in 2022. He later was appointed as a Senator to serve as a minister in Anwar Ibrahim cabinet.

In January 2010, Saifuddin was appointed the Secretary-General of PKR, replacing Salehuddin Hashim. In the 2014 party election, he vacated the post to run for the party's deputy presidency, but was defeated by Mohamed Azmin Ali. He was once again appointed to the post of PKR Secretary-General in November 2016, this time to replace Rafizi Ramli. He once again ran for the Deputy President post in the 2022 party election, but ultimately lost to Rafizi Ramli.

== Controversies and issues ==
=== Comment about Kimanis detainees (2022) ===
On 9 December 2022, Saifuddin stated that he had been briefed by Immigration Department officials about a viral video and photos circulating on social media, depicting emaciated detainees allegedly at the Kimanis detention center who were seen appealing to be freed and speaking about their ill-treatment. He expressed that it was 'unfair' for the issue to be sensationalized and urged the media to report objectively. Lawyers for Liberty (LFL) had expressed that it was unacceptable and contrary to good governance for Saifuddin to outrightly dismiss the complaints made by a detainee in a video, instead of ordering an inquiry.

=== Sosma (2022) ===
On 13 December 2022, Saifuddin stated that a review of Sosma was unnecessary as the law was essential for addressing organized crime-related cases. He mentioned that Sosma allowed the court process to proceed. His statement drew brickbats from human rights organisations and politicians.

On 16 February 2023, Saifuddin said Sosma will be strengthened as it is still relevant for maintaining national security. Malaysians Against Death Penalty & Torture (Madpet) said that Saifuddin does not understand the rule of law and the administration of criminal justice; they also called for his resignation.

=== Printing Presses and Publications Act (2023) ===
In April 2023, several journalist groups have criticized Saifuddin for reversing Pakatan Harapan's pledge to review and repeal 'draconian Acts' such as the Printing Presses and Publications Act 1984. The Centre for Independent Journalism (CIJ) executive director, Wathshlah Naidu, stated that Putrajaya's decision to retain the law appears to be a recurring practice among elected governments that backtrack on their election pledges for their own benefit.

=== Swatch LGBT Issue (2023) ===
In May 2023, swiss watchmaker Swatch has reported that Malaysian authorities seized 164 rainbow-colored watches from its Pride collection, with an estimated total value of US$14,000. The confiscation occurred during raids conducted on 13–14 May at eleven shopping malls across Malaysia, including outlets in the capital Kuala Lumpur. The watches were confiscated based on the Printing Presses and Publications Act 1984, which is criticized by some as draconian and often utilized to prevent content that may offend or undermine race relations.

The incident took place in a country where LGBT individuals face discrimination due to the illegality of homosexuality and the potential penalties of imprisonment and corporal punishment for sodomy, although enforcement is infrequent. The watches in question were described as having "LGBT elements" and were said to feature six colors, rather than the traditional seven colors of a rainbow. Swatch Group CEO Nick Hayek expressed disagreement, asserting that the watches, which carry a message of peace and love, should not be considered harmful.

Despite the seizure, Swatch Malaysia's marketing manager, Sarah Kok, confirmed that they would continue replenishing stock and displaying the watches as instructed by the Swiss headquarters. The company expressed confusion over the enforcement unit's actions, wondering how they would handle the numerous natural rainbows that occur frequently in Malaysia's skies.

On 10 August 2023, under the leadership of Saifuddin, the home ministry has banned all Swatch products that contain any elements related to lesbian, gay, bisexual, transgender, or queer (LGBTQ) individuals, whether on the watches themselves, their boxes, or wrappers. The ministry stated that this ban has been officially declared under the Printing Presses and Publications (Prohibition of Undesirable Publications) Order 2023, citing Swatch products as potentially "prejudicial to morality." Individuals who possess such products from Swatch may face penalties of up to three years' imprisonment, a maximum fine of RM20,000, or both, if found guilty.

=== Naturalisation of seven footballers (2025–2026) ===
Saifuddin in his capacity as Minister of Home Affairs, came under scrutiny following the naturalisation of seven foreign-born footballers who subsequently represented Malaysia. The controversy emerged after the Fédération Internationale de Football Association (FIFA) found that documents submitted by the Football Association of Malaysia (FAM) to establish the players' eligibility had been falsified. FIFA imposed sanctions on FAM and the seven players in September 2025.

On 9 October 2025, Saifuddin defended the citizenship approvals in the Dewan Rakyat, stating that the applications had been processed in accordance with Article 19 of the Federal Constitution and the Citizenship Rules 1964. He acknowledged exercising ministerial discretion under Section 20(1)(e) of Part III of the Second Schedule to the Federal Constitution to recognise periods of residence outside Malaysia as qualifying periods of residence. He maintained that the citizenship approval process was separate from the players' eligibility to represent Malaysia under FIFA regulations.

In March 2026, the Court of Arbitration for Sport (CAS) partially upheld the sanctions imposed by FIFA, restricting the players' suspensions to official matches while maintaining the financial penalty imposed on FAM.

On 10 July 2026, the Enforcement Agency Integrity Commission (EAIC) announced the findings of its investigation into the citizenship approval process. The commission identified procedural irregularities, including shortcomings in immigration security screening, entry permit interviews, Malay language proficiency assessments and verification of the renunciation of the players' previous citizenships. It also found that the applications had been processed within an unusually short period. The EAIC recommended that the Ministry of Home Affairs and the National Registration Department review the approvals and establish clearer procedures governing the exercise of ministerial discretion in naturalisation cases.

The EAIC's findings prompted further scrutiny of the Home Ministry's administration of citizenship applications and the oversight exercised by the relevant government agencies.

=== Immigration corruption and counter-setting syndicate (2023–2025) ===
During his tenure as Minister of Home Affairs, the Malaysian Immigration Department came under scrutiny following investigations into corruption involving immigration officers at Kuala Lumpur International Airport (KLIA). The investigations exposed a syndicate known as "counter-setting", which allegedly facilitated the entry of foreign nationals into Malaysia without undergoing the required immigration checks, in exchange for bribes.

In September 2024, the Malaysian Anti-Corruption Commission (MACC) arrested immigration personnel suspected of involvement in the syndicate. By November 2024, approximately 50 immigration enforcement officers had been arrested on suspicion of colluding with the syndicate. The Immigration Department subsequently transferred the officers from their original assignments at immigration entry counters while investigations continued.

In December 2024, Malaysiakini reported allegations from sources that the syndicate remained operational despite the arrests, with officers allegedly adapting their methods to avoid detection. The MACC stated that investigations were ongoing and that evidence concerning several officers had been submitted to the Deputy Public Prosecutor for consideration of prosecution.

In April 2025, the MACC arrested three immigration officers in connection with a separate investigation into an alleged RM10 million corruption network believed to have facilitated the entry of foreign nationals through KLIA Terminals 1 and 2 without proper immigration screening. The investigation concerned activities allegedly carried out between 2021 and 2024.

On 4 August 2025, Saifuddin informed the Dewan Rakyat that 26 enforcement officers had been dismissed in 2024 and another eight in 2023 in connection with integrity violations involving immigration enforcement. He also disclosed that the MACC had handled 50 cases involving so-called "phantom travellers", with two cases at the time proceeding towards prosecution. He identified counter-setting, flying passports and phantom travel arrangements as forms of misconduct affecting immigration controls.

Saifuddin outlined several measures to address the problem, including expanding automated immigration gates, introducing body-worn cameras for enforcement officers, implementing the Advanced Passenger Screening System and conducting integrity training in collaboration with the MACC and other enforcement agencies. The ministry also planned to expand biometric screening and reduce direct human intervention in immigration clearance procedures.

In September 2025, the Immigration Department announced that 20 officers had been dismissed following convictions related to counter-setting activities, while hundreds of other officers remained under investigation for various disciplinary matters.

In January 2026, the Enforcement Agency Integrity Commission (EAIC) announced that its investigation into a separate alleged flying-passport incident at KLIA Terminal 1 had found that an immigration officer entered a passenger's passport details into the MyIMMs immigration system without the passenger being physically present at the counter. The commission referred its findings to the Immigration Department's disciplinary authority and recommended disciplinary action.

== Personal life ==
Saifuddin Nasution is married to Norhayati Musa and shared 4 children. One of his son, Arham Rahimin Nasution Saifuddin Nasution, continued his studies in Egypt at a study center known as Ma'ahad Buuth Islamiyyah under the patronage of Al-Azhar. And now his son has continued his studies in Cape Town, South Africa because of his ambition to follow in his father's footsteps as a politician.

== Election results ==
Kedah State Legislative Assembly
Year	Constituency	Candidate	Votes	Pct	Opponent(s)	Votes	Pct	Ballots cast	Majority	Turnout
2000	N34 Lunas	Saifuddin Nasution Ismail (KeADILan)	10,511	50.66%	S.Anthonysamy (MIC)	9,981	48.10%	20,746	530	77.58%
2000	N34 Lunas	Saifuddin Nasution Ismail (KeADILan)	10,511	50.66%	N.Letchumanan (IND)	50	0.24%	20,746	530	77.58%
2004	N16 Kubang Rotan	Saifuddin Nasution Ismail (PKR)	6,527	31.09%	Syed Razak Syed Zain Barakbah (UMNO)	14,468	68.91%	21,415	7,941	78.36%

Penang State Legislative Assembly
Year	Constituency	Candidate	Votes	Pct	Opponent(s)	Votes	Pct	Ballots cast	Majority	Turnout
2018	N36 Pantai Jerejak	Saifuddin Nasution Ismail (PKR)	14,014	73.50%	Oh Tong Keong (Gerakan)	3,298	17.30%	19,315	10,716	81.70%
2018	N36 Pantai Jerejak	Saifuddin Nasution Ismail (PKR)	14,014	73.50%	Mohd Farhan Yusri (PAS)	1,670	8.80%	19,315	10,716	81.70%
2018	N36 Pantai Jerejak	Saifuddin Nasution Ismail (PKR)	14,014	73.50%	Yim Boon Leong (MUP)	97	0.40%	19,315	10,716	81.70%

Parliament of Malaysia
Year	Constituency	Candidate	Votes	Pct	Opponent(s)	Votes	Pct	Ballots cast	Majority	Turnout
1999	P017 Padang Serai	Saifuddin Nasution Ismail (KeADILan)	18,023	38.53%	Lim Bee Kau (MCA)	27,395	58.56%	46,778	9.372	72.75%
2004	P017 Padang Serai	Saifuddin Nasution Ismail (PKR)	15,953	37.78%	Lim Bee Kau (MCA)	26,269	62.22%	43,307	10,316	80.31%
2008	P029 Machang	Saifuddin Nasution Ismail (PKR)	21,041	50.71%	Sazmi Miah (UMNO)	19,581	47.19%	51,372	1,460	86.74%
2013	P018 Kulim-Bandar Baharu	Saifuddin Nasution Ismail (PKR)	24,911	47.42%	Abd Aziz Sheikh Fadzir (UMNO)	26,782	50.98%	52,766	1,871	86.63%
2018	P018 Kulim-Bandar Baharu	Saifuddin Nasution Ismail (PKR)	23,159	42.62%	Abd Aziz Sheikh Fadzir (UMNO)	18,299	33.67%	55,390	4,860	83.18%
2018	P018 Kulim-Bandar Baharu	Saifuddin Nasution Ismail (PKR)	23,159	42.62%	Hassan Abdul Razak (PAS)	12,885	23.71%	55,390	4,860	83.18%
2022	P018 Kulim-Bandar Baharu	Saifuddin Nasution Ismail (PKR)	21,408	30.44%	Roslan Hashim (BERSATU)	34,469	49.00%	71,616	13,061	79.40%
2022	P018 Kulim-Bandar Baharu	Saifuddin Nasution Ismail (PKR)	21,408	30.44%	Muhar Hussain (UMNO)	13,872	19.72%	71,616	13,061	79.40%
2022	P018 Kulim-Bandar Baharu	Saifuddin Nasution Ismail (PKR)	21,408	30.44%	Mohd Yusrizal Yusuf (PEJUANG)	591	0.84%	71,616	13,061	79.40%

== Honours ==
=== Honours of Malaysia ===
- Malaysia
  - Recipient of the 17th Yang di-Pertuan Agong Installation Medal (2024)
- Kedah
  - Commander of the Order of Loyalty to the Royal House of Kedah (DSDK) – Dato' (2012)
  - Recipient of the Sultan Abdul Halim Golden Jubilee Medal (2008)
  - Recipient of the Sultan Sallehuddin Installation Medal (2018)
- Kelantan
  - Knight Grand Commander of the Order of the Life of the Crown of Kelantan (SJMK) – Dato' (2026)
- Malacca
  - Grand Commander of the Exalted Order of Malacca (DGSM) – Datuk Seri (2018)
- Sabah
  - Grand Commander of the Order of Kinabalu (SPDK) – Datuk Seri Panglima (2025)

== See also ==
- Members of the Malaysian Parliament who represented multiple states
- List of people who have served in both Houses of the Malaysian Parliament
