= Tang Heap Seng =

Malaysian politician

Tang Heap Seng PJK
- 陈协成

Personal details
- Born: 2 October 1957 (age 68) George Town, Penang, Federation of Malaya (now Malaysia)
- Party: Malaysian Chinese Association (MCA)
- Other political affiliations: Barisan Nasional (BN)
- Occupation: Politician, Engineer

Chinese name
- Traditional Chinese: 陳協成
- Simplified Chinese: 陈协成
- Hanyu Pinyin: Chén Xiéchéng
- Hokkien POJ: Tân Hia̍psêng

Tang Heap Seng (陈协成; born 2 October 1957) is a Malaysian. He is a veteran Malaysian Chinese Association (MCA) leader for the Air Putih constituency of Penang. Tang contested the Bayan Baru parliamentary seat in the 2013 general election representing Barisan Nasional but lost to the Parti Keadilan Rakyat (PKR) candidate, Sim Tze Tzin with a majority of a 19,307. In the 2018 general election, he contested the Penang state constituency of Air Putih but lost to Lim Guan Eng from Democratic Action Party (DAP) in a four-corner fight.

== Education ==
Tang studied engineering in University Malaya, he graduated with honors in 1982.

== Service to the community ==
Tang was the one who suggested that walkie-talkie must be provided to the local community policing squad in order to be an effective force in deterring crime in housing and business area. To date, 9 walkie-talkies was given to a squad of 60 members.

== Election results ==
Parliament of Malaysia
Year	Constituency	Candidate	Votes	Pct	Opponent(s)	Votes	Pct	Ballots cast	Majority	Turnout
2013	P052 Bayan Baru	Tang Heap Seng (MCA)	24,251	35.66%	Sim Tze Tzin (PKR)	43,558	64.06%	68,849	19,307	86.98%

Penang State Legislative Assembly
Year	Constituency	Candidate	Votes	Pct	Opponent(s)	Votes	Pct	Ballots cast	Majority	Turnout
2018	N23 Air Putih	Tang Heap Seng (MCA)	1,404	12.84%	Lim Guan Eng (DAP)	9,362	85.61%	10,936	7,958	82.00%
2018	N23 Air Putih	Tang Heap Seng (MCA)	1,404	12.84%	Tan Gim Theam (MUP)	87	0.79%	10,936	7,958	82.00%
2018	N23 Air Putih	Tang Heap Seng (MCA)	1,404	12.84%	Manikandan Ramayah (PCM)	83	0.76%	10,936	7,958	82.00%

== Awards ==
For his valor in community service and charity works, Tang was awarded the Meritorious Service Medal from the Pulau Pinang government.

- Penang
  - Recipient of the Meritorious Service Medal (PJK) (2002)
