= Roslan Hashim =

Malaysian politician

Yang Berhormat Tuan Roslan Hashim MP
- روسلن هشيم

Member of the Malaysian Parliament for Kulim-Bandar Baharu
- Incumbent
- Assumed office 19 November 2022
- Preceded by: Saifuddin Nasution Ismail (PH–PKR)
- Majority: 13,061 (2022)

Personal details
- Born: Roslan bin Hashim
- Party: Malaysian United Indigenous Party (BERSATU)
- Other political affiliations: Perikatan Nasional (PN)

Roslan bin Hashim is a Malaysian politician who has served as the Member of Parliament (MP) for Kulim-Bandar Baharu since November 2022. He is a member of the Malaysian United Indigenous Party (BERSATU), a component party of the Perikatan Nasional (PN) coalition.

== Election results ==
Parliament of Malaysia
Year	Constituency	Candidate	Votes	Pct	Opponent(s)	Votes	Pct	Ballots cast	Majority	Turnout
2022	P018 Kulim-Bandar Baharu	Roslan Hashim (BERSATU)	34,469	49.00%	Saifuddin Nasution Ismail (PKR)	21,408	30.44%	71,616	13,061	79.40%
2022	P018 Kulim-Bandar Baharu	Roslan Hashim (BERSATU)	34,469	49.00%	Muhar Hussain (UMNO)	13,872	19.72%	71,616	13,061	79.40%
2022	P018 Kulim-Bandar Baharu	Roslan Hashim (BERSATU)	34,469	49.00%	Mohd Yusrizal Yusuf (PEJUANG)	591	0.84%	71,616	13,061	79.40%

== Honours ==
=== Honours of Malaysia ===
- Malaysia
  - Recipient of the 17th Yang di-Pertuan Agong Installation Medal (2024)
