= Khalid Abdul Samad =

Malaysian politician

- خالد عبدالصمد
- Khalid in 2026

Chairman of the Kemubu Agricultural Development Authority
- Incumbent
- Assumed office 1 December 2024
- Minister: Mohamad Sabu
- General Manager: Faizul Mustafa
- Preceded by: Muhammad Husain

Minister of Federal Territories
- In office 2 July 2018 – 24 February 2020
- Monarchs: Muhammad V (2018–2019); Abdullah (2019–2020)
- Prime Minister: Mahathir Mohamad
- Deputy: Shahruddin Md Salleh
- Preceded by: Tengku Adnan Tengku Mansor
- Succeeded by: Annuar Musa
- Constituency: Shah Alam

Member of the Malaysian Parliament for Shah Alam
- In office 8 March 2008 – 19 November 2022
- Preceded by: Abdul Aziz Shamsuddin (BN–UMNO)
- Succeeded by: Azli Yusof (PH–AMANAH)
- Majority: 33,849 (2018); 10,939 (2013); 9,314 (2008)

President of Kuala Lumpur Football Association (KLFA)
- In office 24 November 2019 – 2023
- Preceded by: Adnan Md Ikhsan
- Succeeded by: Syed Yazid Syed Omar

Personal details
- Born: Khalid bin Abdul Samad; 14 August 1957 (age 69) Kota Bharu, Kelantan, Federation of Malaya (now Malaysia)
- Citizenship: Malaysia
- Party: Malaysian Islamic Party (PAS) (1983–2015); National Trust Party (AMANAH) (since 2015)
- Other political affiliations: Angkatan Perpaduan Ummah (1990–1996); Barisan Alternatif (BA) (1998–2004); Pakatan Rakyat (PR) (2008–2015); Pakatan Harapan (PH) (since 2015)
- Spouse(s): Zaitun Abu Bakar; Salwani Yusof (died 2024)
- Relations: Shahrir Abdul Samad (Elder brother)
- Children: 6
- Education: University of Leeds (BEng)
- Occupation: Politician
- Profession: Engineer
- Website: www.khalidsamad.com
- Khalid Abdul Samad on Facebook; Khalid Abdul Samad on Parliament of Malaysia

Khalid bin Abdul Samad (Jawi: خالد بن عبدالصمد; born 14 August 1957) is a Malaysian politician who has served as Chairman of Kemubu Agricultural Development Authority (KADA) since December 2024. He had served as the Minister of Federal Territories in the Pakatan Harapan (PH) administration under former Prime Minister Mahathir Mohamad from July 2018 to the collapse of the PH administration in February 2020 and the Member of Parliament (MP) for Shah Alam from March 2008 to November 2022. He is a member, Communications Director and State Chairman of the Federal Territories of the National Trust Party (AMANAH), a component party of the PH coalition and was a member of the Malaysian Islamic Party (PAS), a former component party of the former Pakatan Rakyat (PR) and Barisan Alternatif (BA) coalitions. He is also the younger brother of Shahrir Abdul Samad, former Minister and MP of the United Malays National Organisation (UMNO), a component party of the Barisan Nasional (BN) coalition. Before PH and BN established political cooperation and formed the federal coalition government in November 2022, they were opposing politically as both of them were in opposing political sides.

== Early life ==
Khalid was born in Kota Bharu, Kelantan in 1957.

He graduated with a degree in Fuel and Energy Engineering from Leeds University in 1979 and then worked for Petronas.

== Political career ==
He was a columnist at The Malaysian Insider and a prominent member of the moderate wing of PAS before they split to found AMANAH in 2015.

Khalid joined PAS in 1983 and became a central committee member from 1987 to 1993. In 1987, he was detained for nine months under the Internal Security Act (ISA) during Operation Lalang crackdown.

He had unsuccessfully contested as PAS candidate the parliamentary seats of Kuala Krai (1986), Arau (1990), Sri Gading (1999) and Shah Alam (2004) in the general elections before finally won the Shah Alam seat in the 2008 general election and retained it in the 2013 general election.

In 2010, Khalid became engaged in a debate with fellow opposition (later pro-government independent) Member of Parliament Zulkifli Nordin over the use of the word "Allah" by non-Muslims. After Khalid stated that he opposed a Selangor law that prohibited non-Muslims from using the word "Allah", Zulkifli lodged a police report accusing Khalid of sedition. Zulkifi, a Kedah MP, moved to Selangor to run in the Shah Alam seat against Khalid in the 2013 election as a Barisan Nasional (BN) candidate, but was beaten by Khalid who was re-elected with an increased margin.

In August 2014, Khalid was charged under Section 4 of the Sedition Act for allegedly questioning the executive powers of the Selangor Islamic Religious Department (Jais) in relation to the confiscation of Malay-language and Iban-language bibles. Khalid was among several other opposition politicians as well as non-politicians arrested in the 2014 Malaysian sedition dragnet.

Khalid again managed to retain the Shah Alam seat in the 2018 general election but the first time for the Amanah party and was soon selected as the new PH coalition federal government cabinet minister.

On 23 October 2022, AMANAH election director Asmuni Awi revealed that Khalid would contest for the Titiwangsa federal seat in the 2022 general election. Asmuni also commented that AMANAH was taking risk to field Khalid to contest for the seat instead of the Shah Alam federal seat which is the stronghold of Khalid. Khalid also added that it was not an easy decision to leave Shah Alam where he had served as MP from 2008 to 2022 for three terms and 14 years. He lost the election to Johari Abdul Ghani from BN and UMNO by a minority of 4,632 votes by garnering 20,410 votes. His defeat also paved the way for Johari to return as Titiwangsa MP and is the only electoral defeat of PH in Kuala Lumpur.

== Election results ==
Parliament of Malaysia
Year	Constituency	Candidate	Votes	Pct	Opponent(s)	Votes	Pct	Ballots cast	Majority	Turnout
1986	P028 Kuala Krai	Khalid Abdul Samad (PAS)	10,330	45.77%	Mohamed Isa (UMNO)	12,240	54.23%	23,127	1,910	77.91%
1990	P002 Arau	Khalid Abdul Samad (PAS)	13,154	38.57%	Shahidan Kassim (UMNO)	20,948	61.43%	35,196	7,794	77.42%
1999	P134 Sri Gading	Khalid Abdul Samad (PAS)	11,598	28.41%	Mohamad Aziz (UMNO)	29,156	71.42%	41,687	17,558	74.83%
2004	P108 Shah Alam	Khalid Abdul Samad (PAS)	19,007	36.81%	Abdul Aziz Shamsuddin (UMNO)	32,417	62.78%	52,336	13,410	75.66%
2008	P108 Shah Alam	Khalid Abdul Samad (PAS)	33,356	57.90%	Abdul Aziz Shamsuddin (UMNO)	24,042	41.73%	58,361	9,314	77.47%
2013	P108 Shah Alam	Khalid Abdul Samad (PAS)	49,009	56.16%	Zulkifli Noordin (UMNO)	38,070	43.63%	88,126	10,939	88.16%
2018	P108 Shah Alam	Khalid Abdul Samad (AMANAH)	55,949	60.00%	Azhari Shaari (UMNO)	22,100	23.70%	93,243	33,849	87.82%
2018	P108 Shah Alam	Khalid Abdul Samad (AMANAH)	55,949	60.00%	Mohd Zuhdi Marzuki (PAS)	15,194	16.30%	93,243	33,849	87.82%
2022	P119 Titiwangsa	Khalid Abdul Samad (AMANAH)	20,410	33.54%	Johari Abdul Ghani (UMNO)	25,042	41.15%	60,858	4,632	75.37%
2022	P119 Titiwangsa	Khalid Abdul Samad (AMANAH)	20,410	33.54%	Rosni Adam (PAS)	15,418	23.86%	60,858	4,632	75.37%
2022	P119 Titiwangsa	Khalid Abdul Samad (AMANAH)	20,410	33.54%	Khairuddin Abu Hassan (PEJUANG)	888	1.46%	60,858	4,632	75.37%

Selangor State Legislative Assembly
Year	Constituency	Candidate	Votes	Pct	Opponent(s)	Votes	Pct	Ballots cast	Majority	Turnout
1999	N37 Kota Raja	Khalid Abdul Samad (PAS)	10,361	44.96%	Kamala Ganapathy (MIC)	12,686	55.04%	23,047	2,325	76.90%

== Controversies ==
1. The gazettement of the Kuala Lumpur City Plan (KLCP) 2020 by Federal Territories Minister YB Khalid Abdul Samad late last October, was met with dismay by many stakeholders. The gazetted plan was neither the 2008 draft local plan nor the 2013 revised plan, but a “2015” version that had not gone through the processes and procedures required, as stipulated under the Federal Territory Planning Act.
2. The use of the Land Acquisition Act upon Kampung Baru residents. A provision of RM10 billion was made to buy Kampung Baru land, without the Cabinet’s prior approval. It is believed that he could have protected the people's interest in the Sungai Baru flats case and not allowing the residents to sign a lopsided agreement with the developer during his time as the Federal Territories minister. Similarly in 2017, developers had approached his predecessor to get the residents' signatures, but it was declined due to questionable track records.
3. Khalid filed a suit against Mahamad Naser in December 2017 claiming that he (Mahamad Naser) made malicious statements against him in a seminar organised by the Selangor Islamic Religious Department (JAIS) on Sept 28, 2017 at the Tengku Ampuan Jemaah Mosque, Bukit Jelutong in Shah Alam. Khalid claimed that Mahamad Naser, had in a lecture entitled, `Discourse on current issues and Selangor state legislation: Doctrine: Challenges and Constitution,’ had among other matters, stated that he (Khalid) was strongly against RUU355, against the implementation of Islamic law including hudud, and opposed efforts to empower the Syariah Courts. The High Court on July 17, 2019, ruled in favour of Khalid and ordered Mahamad Naser to pay him RM80,000. A Federal Court three-member panel comprising Justices Tan Sri Rohana Yusuf and Federal Court judges Datuk Harmindar Singh Dhaliwal and Datuk Mohamad Zabidin Mohd Diah, in an online court proceeding today, dismissed Khalid’s application and ordered him to pay RM30,000 costs.

Political offices
Preceded by Tengku Adnan Tengku Mansor	Minister of Federal Territories (Malaysia); 2 July 2018–24 February 2020	Succeeded by Annuar Musa
Parliament of Malaysia
Preceded by Abdul Aziz Shamsuddin	Member of Parliament for Shah Alam; 8 March 2008–present	Incumbent
