= Isham Jalil =

Malaysian politician

Isham Jalil KMN
- هشام جليل

Information Chief of the United Malays National Organisation
- In office 20 November 2022 – 22 March 2023
- President: Ahmad Zahid Hamidi
- Preceded by: Shahril Sufian Hamdan
- Succeeded by: Azalina Othman Said

Personal details
- Born: Hizatul Isham bin Abdul Jalil; 11 June 1976 (age 50) Hospital Besar Kuala Lumpur, Malaysia
- Party: United Malays National Organisation (UMNO) (2000–2023) (Note: Sacked from UMNO on 7 December 2023.); Independent (2023–2026); Malaysian Islamic Party (PAS) (since 2026)
- Other political affiliations: Barisan Nasional (BN) (2000–2023); Perikatan Nasional (PN) (since 2026)
- Education: Sultan Alam Shah School; University of Bristol (BEng); The Wharton School (MBA); Harvard University (MPP)
- Occupation: Politician
- Website: https://ishamjalil.wordpress.com/biodata/
- Isham Jalil on Facebook; Isham Jalil on TikTok

Hizatul Isham bin Abdul Jalil (Jawi: هيذاتول اشعام بن عبدالجليل, Malay pronunciation: [isham]; born 11 June 1976) or more commonly known as Isham Jalil, is a Malaysian politician who is a member of the Malaysian Islamic Party (PAS), a component party of the Perikatan Nasional (PN) coalition. He is a former Member of the UMNO Supreme Council from June 2022 to December 2023, and has previously served as the Information Chief of UMNO from November 2022 to March 2023.

== Early life and education ==
Born in Hospital Besar Kuala Lumpur and raised in Selangor, Isham is the third child of seven siblings and was brought up in a low-income family. His father had to juggle various jobs to make ends meet where he had worked as a gardener, truck driver and night market trader to raise his family. Despite all the adversities, Isham was a hardworking student where he excelled with straight A's throughout his schooling days. Isham studied at Sekolah Alam Shah.

He eventually received a scholarship to study for his bachelor's degree in engineering abroad where he graduated at the University of Bristol. Isham then furthered his postgraduate studies at Ivy League universities where he completed his first master's degree in Public Policy (MPP) in Political Economy and Development with a minor in Law from Harvard University, and a second master's in Business Administration (MBA) in Finance from The Wharton School, University of Pennsylvania. At Harvard, Isham Jalil wrote a book titled "Malaysia Beyond 2020: Ideologies and Institutions for Growth" where it is currently archived in the Harvard University library.

== Early career ==
Isham has nearly 20 years of shared experience working in the civil service and the government-linked company, Tenaga Nasional Berhad (TNB). His career advanced when he was appointed to the Prime Minister's Office under the former Prime Minister Najib Razak as his Special Officer and the Director at the Prime Minister's Office. In 2008 he was sent to the Economic Planning Unit, Prime Minister's Department to help the government enact national energy policies, especially those involving petroleum, electricity and gas.

During his time working at the civil service, he has been involved in the formulation of the 10th Malaysia Plan, the National Energy Policy 2010–2030, the subsidy rationalization program, and the restructuring of the country's electricity industry. Isham had also worked as a part-time lecturer at University of Technology MARA (UiTM) and University of Technology Malaysia (UTM) for three years between 2000 and 2003.

== Political career ==
=== History with BN and UMNO ===
Isham has had a long history with BN and UMNO ever since he was at the early age of 10 where he had followed and accompanied his parents to political talks during election seasons. As he was raised by parents who are UMNO stalwarts, Isham has helped his parents and UMNO campaign where in the 1986 Malaysian general election, he started putting up BN posters and helped write speeches for his father at the branch level for election campaigns. Prior to his sacking, Isham was a member of UMNO Putrajaya and Sungai Buloh. Before he was appointed as Member of the Supreme Council of UMNO, Isham was also appointed and served as the State Information Chief of BN Selangor. Isham was Information Chief of UMNO after GE-15 from November 2022 to March 2023 before being replaced by Minister of Law and Institutional Reform, Azalina Othman Said after he handed over the post to contest for the UMNO Supreme Council. Isham contested in the UMNO election in March 2023 and won the post placing 19th out of 85 candidates with a total votes of 42,340 and 101 UMNO divisions out of 191 nationwide. On 7 December 2023, he was sacked from the party by UMNO President for not agreeing to cooperate with DAP in elections.

=== Contesting in the 2022 General Election ===
In the 2022 general election, he was hinted and expected to contest for the Shah Alam federal seat. On 1 November 2022, he was confirmed to be nominated as a candidate representing the BN coalition to contest for the seat but eventually lost to Pakatan Harapan candidate Azli Yusof.

== Views ==
=== Ideology ===
Described as a "Conservative nationalist", Isham believes that Malaysia should maintain its vision of cultural integration rather than forced assimilation in order to maintain racial and social harmony. He believes that Chinese and Indian vernacular schools should not be abolished and rejects the "Malaysian Malaysia" identity as it would exacerbate racial tensions within Malaysia. In the case of meritocracy, Isham has the stance where it breeds injustice and it would promote selective discrimination due to its incomplete nature. From Astro Awani's three way dialogue with Bachok MP Syahir Sulaiman and Sunway University Professor Wong Chin Huat, Isham has stated that:

I've said why meritocracy is not fair in Malaysia, why? Because meritocracy is based on criteria, and these criterias are written by humans, and if the criterias are not fair, then it can cause systemic discrimination. For example, students in Terengganu are among the many students who get the highest results in Malaysia every year, but if you want to compare their ability to speak English compared to students in Kuala Lumpur, it is very different, but if you want to give scholarships based on the language criteria alone, it will create systemic discrimination.

— Isham Jalil

=== Future of BN and UMNO ===
The regression of Malaysia's grand old party political influence after the 2022 Malaysian general election has led Isham to advocate for BN and UMNO to persist in going solo. He believes that in order to regain confidence and relevance, BN should have not joined with either coalitions PH or PN but instead continued in parliament as a separate independent block that could provide check and balance as a credible opposition. Although, BN eventually formed a unity-government with PH, Gabungan Parti Sarawak (GPS), Gabungan Rakyat Sabah (GRS), and Parti Warisan under the behest of the King of Malaysia, Abdullah of Pahang.

He has pessimistic views over the ruling Pakatan Harapan (PH) coalition particularly its largest member, the Democratic Action Party (DAP) where he claims that the party's ideology contradicts with the national constitution and blames them for their lack of commitment which caused BN to lose votes during the 2023 Malaysian state elections. Previously, Isham was offered board seats for GLCs twice under the PH and also the PN government but he turned down the offers.

=== Avid supporter of Najib ===
Isham is known to be a strong supporter and loyalist of his former boss Najib Razak and has continued to pressure the government for his release where he has described Najib's prosecution as unjust and plagued with political motives. He believes that Najib's presence was vital and crucial for BN's electoral success post-GE14, particularly in both the 2021 Melaka state election and 2022 Johor state election where BN had won two-third majorities in both state assemblies, as well as various by-elections where BN had secured and swayed various seats such as in Semenyih, Cameron Highlands, Kimanis, and Tanjung Piai. Isham posited that one of the three fundamental reasons of UMNO's loss of support and growing irrelevance is due to the absence of Najib.

== Election results ==
Parliament of Malaysia
Year	Constituency	Candidate	Votes	Pct	Opponent(s)	Votes	Pct	Ballots cast	Majority	Turnout
2022	P108 Shah Alam	Hizatul Isham Abdul Jalil (UMNO)	28,266	20.82%	Azli Yusof (AMANAH)	61,409	45.23%	136,689	18,095	82.44%
2022	P108 Shah Alam	Hizatul Isham Abdul Jalil (UMNO)	28,266	20.82%	Afif Bahardin (BERSATU)	43,314	31.90%	136,689	18,095	82.44%
2022	P108 Shah Alam	Hizatul Isham Abdul Jalil (UMNO)	28,266	20.82%	Muhammad Rafique Rashid Ali (PEJUANG)	2,781	2.05%	136,689	18,095	82.44%

== Publications ==
- ICERD dan Mengapa Semua Kaum di Malaysia perlu menolaknya (2018)
- Halatuju Orang Melayu dan UMNO Pasca 9 Mei (2018)
- Malaysia Beyond 2020: Ideologies and Institutions for Growth (Harvard University, 2013)

== Honours and awards ==
=== Honours of Malaysia ===
- Malaysia
  - Officer of the Order of the Defender of the Realm (KMN) (2017)
