= Abdul Aziz Shamsuddin =

Malaysian politician (1938–2020)

Yang Berbahagia Tan Sri Dato' Seri Abdul Aziz Shamsuddin PSM SPMP SSAP DGSM DPMP DPMS DSDK DIMP PMP PPN
- عبدالعزيز شمس الدين

Minister of Rural and Regional Development
- In office 27 March 2004 – 18 March 2008
- Monarchs: Sirajuddin; Mizan Zainal Abidin
- Prime Minister: Abdullah Ahmad Badawi
- Deputy: Awang Adek Hussin (2004–2006); Tiki Lafe; Zainal Abdidin Osman (2006–2008)
- Preceded by: Azmi Khalid
- Succeeded by: Muhammad Muhammad Taib
- Constituency: Shah Alam

Deputy Minister of Education
- In office 15 December 1999 – 26 March 2004 Serving with Han Choon Kim
- Monarchs: Salahuddin; Sirajuddin
- Prime Minister: Mahathir Mohamad; Abdullah Ahmad Badawi
- Minister: Musa Mohamad
- Preceded by: Mohd Khalid Mohd Yunos; Fong Chan Onn
- Succeeded by: Mahadzir Mohd Khir
- Constituency: Senator

Member of the Malaysian Parliament for Shah Alam
- In office 21 March 2004 – 8 March 2008
- Preceded by: Mohd Zin Mohamed (BN–UMNO)
- Succeeded by: Khalid Abdul Samad (PR–PAS)
- Majority: 13,410 (2004)

Personal details
- Born: Abdul Aziz bin Shamsuddin; 10 June 1938 Gopeng, Perak, Federated Malay States (now Malaysia)
- Died: 16 October 2020 (aged 82) Ara Damansara Medical Centre, Selangor, Malaysia
- Resting place: Gunung Mesah Muslim Cemetery, Gopeng, Perak
- Party: United Malays National Organisation (UMNO)
- Other political affiliations: Barisan Nasional (BN); Perikatan Nasional (PN); Muafakat Nasional (MN)
- Spouse: Puan Sri Rosmawaty Abd Raffar
- Children: 4
- Education: University of Malaya

Abdul Aziz bin Shamsuddin (Jawi: عبدالعزيز بن شمس الدين; 10 June 1938 – 16 October 2020) was a Malaysian politician who served as Minister of Rural and Regional Development from 2004 to 2008.

== Career ==
In 1975, he was appointed as a special officer to the then minister of education, Mahathir Mohamad. Subsequently, he served as Mahathir's private secretary during his tenure as prime minister from 1981 to 1999. In 1999, Abdul Aziz entered the sixth Mahathir cabinet and was appointed as the deputy minister of education.

He served as minister of rural and regional development from 27 March 2004 to 18 March 2008.

== Death ==
Abdul Aziz Shamsuddin died on 16 October 2020 at 11.52 pm. He was 82 years old. He was to laid to rest at the Gunung Mesah Muslim Cemetery, Gopeng, Perak.

== Election results ==
Parliament of Malaysia
Year	Constituency	Candidate	Votes	Pct	Opponent(s)	Votes	Pct	Ballots cast	Majority	Turnout
2004	P108 Shah Alam	Abdul Aziz Shamsuddin (UMNO)	32,417	63.04%	Khalid Abdul Samad (PAS)	19,007	36.96%	52,336	13,410	75.66%
2008	P108 Shah Alam	Abdul Aziz Shamsuddin (UMNO)	24,042	41.73%	Khalid Abdul Samad (PAS)	33,356	57.90%	58,361	9,314	77.47%

== Honours ==
- Malaysia
  - Medal of the Order of the Defender of the Realm (PPN) (1978)
  - Commander of the Order of Loyalty to the Crown of Malaysia (PSM) – Tan Sri (2010)
- Kedah
  - Knight Companion of the Order of Loyalty to the Royal House of Kedah (DSDK) – Dato' (1997)
- Malacca
  - Grand Commander of the Exalted Order of Malacca (DGSM) – Datuk Seri (2004)
- Pahang
  - Knight Companion of the Order of the Crown of Pahang (DIMP) – Dato' (1999)
  - Grand Knight of the Order of Sultan Ahmad Shah of Pahang (SSAP) – Dato' Sri (2004)
- Perak
  - Commander of the Order of the Perak State Crown (PMP) (1985)
  - Knight Commander of the Order of the Perak State Crown (DPMP) – Dato' (1996)
  - Knight Grand Commander of the Order of the Perak State Crown (SPMP) – Dato' Seri (2005)
- Selangor
  - Knight Commander of the Order of the Crown of Selangor (DPMS) – Dato' (2000)
