= Abdul Kadir Sheikh Fadzir =

Malaysian politician

Yang Berbahagia Tan Sri Datuk Seri Panglima Abdul Kadir Sheikh Fadzir PSM DHMS SPDK SJMK DGSM SSAP DSDK PGDK AMN
- عبدالقادر بن شيخ فاضل

President of Malaysia National Alliance Party
- In office 2012–2026
- Deputy: Abdul Aziz Sheikh Fadzir
- Preceded by: Office established

Ministerial roles
- 1982–1983: Parliamentary Secretary of Foreign Affairs
- 1983–1987: Deputy Minister of Foreign Affairs
- 1990–1995: Deputy Minister of Domestic Trade and Consumerism
- 1995–1996: Deputy Minister of Human Resources
- 1996–2004: Minister of Culture, Arts and Tourism
- 2004–2006: Minister of Information

Faction represented in Dewan Rakyat
- 1978–2016: Barisan Nasional

Personal details
- Born: Abdul Kadir bin Sheikh Fadzir; 4 June 1939 (age 87) Kampung Tawar, Kulim, Kedah, Unfederated Malay States, British Malaya (now Malaysia)
- Citizenship: Malaysian
- Party: Malaysia National Alliance Party (IKATAN) (2012–2026); United Malays National Organisation (UMNO) (1969–2012, since 2026)
- Other political affiliations: Gagasan Sejahtera (GS) (2016–2020); Barisan Nasional (1973–2016, since 2026); Alliance Party (1969–1973)
- Relations: Abdul Aziz Sheikh Fadzir (Brother); Musa Sheikh Fadzir (Brother); Haidar Ali Sheikh Fadzir (Brother)
- Education: Lincoln's Inn
- Occupation: Politician
- Profession: Lawyer
- Website: Abdul Kadir Sheikh Fadzir on Facebook

Abdul Kadir bin Sheikh Fadzir (Jawi: عبدالقادر بن شيخ فاضل; born 4 June 1939) is a Malaysian politician and former seven-term Member of Parliament (MP) of Malaysia representing Kulim-Bandar Baharu constituency in the state of Kedah. He also formerly served as the Minister of Information (2004–2006), Minister of Culture, Arts and Tourism (1997–2004) in the Cabinet of Malaysia.

== Early life and education ==
Attended Malay Tawar School (1946–1949), Sultan Badlishah Secondary School, Kulim (1950–1957). In 1968, he studied at Lincoln's Inn, London majoring in law in 1970.

== Early career ==
Abdul Kadir became a teacher at Serdang English School (1958), at Sekolah Kebangsaan Baling (1958–1960), a clerk at the Public Works Department, Alor Star (1960–1963).

He then worked as a General Worker at the Ministry of Foreign Affairs (1963–1964), Third Secretary of Malaysian High Commissioner, Karachi, Pakistan (1964–1965), Third Secretary at the Malaysian Embassy, Saigon, Vietnam (1966–1968) and Political Secretary to General Welfare Minister (1971–1974).

He became a lawyer in the law firm "Hisham, Sobri and Kadir" (1974–1982).

== Political career ==
Abdul Kadir was involved in United Malays National Organisation (UMNO) since 1969. He was the President of UMNO Club, United Kingdom (1969–1970), Kedah UMNO Youth Vice-president (1970–1976), Padang Serai UMNO Deputy Head (1978), Kulim Bandar Baharu MP (1978–2004), Kulim Bandar Baharu Division UMNO (1984–1987).

When UMNO was banned and declared illegal in the 1987 UMNO leadership crisis, Abdul Kadir was loyal to Dr Mahathir Mohamad to set up the UMNO Baru (New UMNO). He joined New UMNO as Member (1988) and was elected UMNO Supreme Council Member (1988).

He became Member of the UMNO Supreme Council of the 2000–2003 session. At the UMNO General Assembly 2004 he was not elected in the list of 25 MKT.

After winning the 1978 elections, he was appointed Parliamentary Secretary of the Ministry of Foreign Affairs (1982), Deputy Foreign Minister (1983), Deputy Minister of Domestic Trade (1990), Deputy Minister of Human Resources (1995) and Deputy Minister of Home Affairs (1999).

=== Minister of Culture, Arts and Tourism ===
The Prime Minister then, Dr Mahathir has appointed Abdul Kadir as the full minister of Culture, Arts and Tourism in 1999. He is also the Chairman of the Malaysia Tourism Promotion Board (1999).

=== Minister of Information ===
In 2004, new Prime Minister, Abdullah Ahmad Badawi has appointed Abdul Kadir as Information Minister, replacing Datuk Mohd Khalil Yaakob.

On 1 April 2005, Radio 6 was re-branded as Minnal FM and inaugurated by Abdul Kadir as the Minister of Information. On 12 November, the 24-hour Kedah FM broadcast, a brainchild of Abdul Kadir was then launched by the Sultan of Kedah. Jia Yu's channel was officiated by Abdul Kadir as Information Minister on 17 November 2005. 70% of imported content from China and Hong Kong is controlled by Cosmos Discovery.

Abdul Kadir has resigned as Information Minister on 14 February 2006. After his resignation in 2006 from cabinet, Datuk Zainuddin Maidin became Information Minister.

=== Social and NGO activities ===
He was one of the leaders of Barisan Nasional (BN) veterans who had formed Angkatan Amanah Merdeka (Amanah) or Independence Trust Forces, a Malaysian Non-Government Organisation (NGO), founded and launched by Tengku Razaleigh Hamzah on 22 July 2011. Abdul Kadir had become the deputy president of the NGO that was alleged to have political motive. As the Amanah is just an NGO, there are some demands for it to change to become a political party and join the opposition in the coming general election.

=== Exit from UMNO ===
On 19 March 2012, Abdul Kadir had made an announcement leaving the party of UMNO after being with the party for more than 56 years. According to Dr Raja Ahmad Al-Hiss, the deputy head of the Pan-Malaysian Islamic Party (PAS) Youth Council vice-chairman, Abdul Kadir's action also gives a clear picture that there is something wrong with UMNO's struggle.

In the same development, PAS described Abdul Kadir as a UMNO veteran to step out of the party as a blow to UMNO president Najib Razak himself. PAS vice-president, Mahfuz Omar said Abdul Kadir's action was to redeem the honor of the BN-led state. Mahfuz believes that Abdul Kadir's actions are a blow to Najib who recently said that the people should not try to impose the future of the country to support the opposition. Mahfuz had also congratulated Abdul Kadir on his decision to make the right decision, and said that the cardiac arrest was a 'signal' to the public to reject UMNO.

"I congratulate him for his boldness and this is a decision for the future of our country. It is in line with what Tengku Razaleigh Hamzah once said that UMNO's defeat in the coming elections is good for the country."

=== Forming Parti Ikatan Bangsa Malaysia (IKATAN) ===
Abdul Kadir formed Parti Ikatan Bangsa Malaysia (IKATAN) or transl. Malaysia National Alliance Party on 7 June 2012 along with a few former UMNO members. After the IKATAN was forced to wait for more than two years for approval, Abdul Kadir dragged the Registrar of Societies (RoS) to High Court in February 2013 for them to approve the party. The party was approved on 15 May 2015 with Abdul Kadir as the first president. IKATAN and Pan-Malaysian Islamic Party (PAS) later formed an informal Third Force political alliances on 16 March 2016, which was called Gagasan Sejahtera (GS) on 13 August 2016.

== In popular culture ==
In 2004, Abdul Kadir had become an 'extra actor' in Mahligai Gading drama, in which Datuk Dr. Maximus Ongkili and Datuk Seri Shahrizat Abdul Jalil also acted.

== Personal life ==
Abdul Kadir married Suraya Mohd Noah and the couple has a twin sons; Erman Abdul Kadir and Erwan Abdul Kadir.

Abdul Kadir's family got a place in UMNO politics especially in Kedah. Beside Abdul Kadir himself was cabinet Minister. His younger brother, Dato' Abd. Aziz Sheikh Fadzir is the former Kuala Ketil seat assemblyman and then former MP for Kulim–Bandar Baharu succeeding Abdul Kadir. He was an UMNO Youth leader. His brothers, Datuk Haidar Ali Sheikh Fadzir became Federal Territory UMNO Youth chief but died of a bacterial infection in the liver and lungs while Datuk Musa Sheikh Fadzir became the leader of Bukit Mertajam UMNO and was appointed Senator.

== Election results ==
Parliament of Malaysia
| Year | Constituency | Candidate | Votes | Pct | Opponent(s) | Votes | Pct | Ballots cast | Majority | Turnout |
|---|---|---|---|---|---|---|---|---|---|---|
| 1978 | P015 Kulim-Bandar Baharu | Abdul Kadir Sheikh Fadzir (UMNO) | 16,360 | 72.04% | Abdul Aziz Kassim (PAS) | 6,351 | 27.96% | N/A | 10,009 | N/A |
| 1982 | P015 Kulim-Bandar Baharu | Abdul Kadir Sheikh Fadzir (UMNO) | 17,097 | 64.48% | Mohamed Salleh Mohamad (PAS) | 4,843 | 18.26% | 27,388 | 12,254 | 75.24% |
| 1982 | P015 Kulim-Bandar Baharu | Abdul Kadir Sheikh Fadzir (UMNO) | 17,097 | 64.48% | Lee Chuan Sam @ Lee Chian Sum (DAP) | 4,576 | 17.26% | 27,388 | 12,254 | 75.24% |
| 1986 | P016 Kulim-Bandar Baharu | Abdul Kadir Sheikh Fadzir (UMNO) | 21,043 | 73.91% | Hassan Razak (PAS) | 7,429 | 26.09% | 29,359 | 13,614 | 69.76% |
| 1990 | P016 Kulim-Bandar Baharu | Abdul Kadir Sheikh Fadzir (UMNO) | 23,149 | 70.90% | Hashim Endut (S46) | 9,499 | 29.10% | 33,699 | 13,650 | 74.23% |
| 1995 | P018 Kulim-Bandar Baharu | Abdul Kadir Sheikh Fadzir (UMNO) | 22,455 | 73.36% | Abdul Aziz Mohamed (S46) | 8,153 | 26.64% | 32,438 | 14,302 | 70.60% |
| 1999 | P018 Kulim-Bandar Baharu | Abdul Kadir Sheikh Fadzir (UMNO) | 20,764 | 62.05% | Syeikh Azmi Ahmad (keADILan) | 12,697 | 37.95% | 34,781 | 8,067 | 73.85% |
| 2004 | P018 Kulim-Bandar Baharu | Abdul Kadir Sheikh Fadzir (UMNO) | 22,556 | 60.77% | Alwi Mohd Yusop (PKR) | 14,558 | 39.23% | 38,789 | 7,998 | 77.54% |

== Honours ==
=== Honours of Malaysia ===
- Malaysia
  - Member of the Order of the Defender of the Realm (AMN) (1992)
  - Commander of the Order of Loyalty to the Crown of Malaysia (PSM) – Tan Sri (2007)
- Kedah
  - Knight Companion of the Order of Loyalty to the Royal House of Kedah (DSDK) – Dato' (1986)
  - Knight Commander of the Order of Loyalty to Sultan Abdul Halim Mu'adzam Shah (DHMS) – Dato' Paduka (2002)
- Kelantan
  - Knight Grand Commander of the Order of the Life of the Crown of Kelantan (SJMK) – Dato' (2003)
- Malacca
  - Grand Commander of the Exalted Order of Malacca (DGSM) – Datuk Seri (2004)
- Pahang
  - Grand Knight of the Order of Sultan Ahmad Shah of Pahang (SSAP) – Dato' Sri (2004)
- Sabah
  - Commander of the Order of Kinabalu (PGDK) – Datuk (1995)
  - Grand Commander of the Order of Kinabalu (SPDK) – Datuk Seri Panglima (2005)

=== Awards and honours ===
- He was also awarded the 'Best Tourism Personality for 2001' by the Pacific Regional Tourism Author Association (PATWA) in Berlin.

== See also ==
- Kulim-Bandar Baharu (federal constituency)
- Parti Ikatan Bangsa Malaysia
