= Kulim-Bandar Baharu =

Federal constituency of Kedah, Malaysia

Kulim-Bandar Baharu (P018)
Kedah constituency

Federal constituency
- Legislature: Dewan Rakyat
- MP: Roslan Hashim; PN
- Constituency created: 1958
- First contested: 1959
- Last contested: 2022

Demographics
- Population (2020): 120,210
- Electors (2023): 90,033
- Area (km²): 690
- Pop. density (per km²): 174.2

Kulim-Bandar Baharu is a federal constituency in Kulim District and Bandar Baharu District, Kedah, Malaysia, that has been represented in the Dewan Rakyat since 1959.

The federal constituency was created in the 1958 redistribution and is mandated to return a single member to the Dewan Rakyat under the first past the post voting system. This is the only constituency which was named after two towns namely Kulim and Bandar Baharu and is still used today.

== Demographics ==
Ethnic breakdown of Kulim-Bandar Baharu's electorate as of 2022
1. Malay (70.3%)
2. Chinese (17.2%)
3. Indian (12.3%)
4. Other ethnicities (0.20%)

As of 2020, Kulim-Bandar Baharu has a population of 120,210 people.

Age breakdown of Kulim-Bandar Baharu's electorate as of 2022
1. 18-20 (6.19%)
2. 21-29 (22.0%)
3. 30-39 (22.0%)
4. 40-49 (17.1%)
5. 50-59 (14.7%)
6. 60-69 (10.8%)
7. 70-79 (5.14%)
8. 80-89 (1.79%)
9. above 90 (0.35%)
Gender breakdown of Kulim-Bandar Baharu's electorate as of 2022
1. Male (49.5%)
2. Female (50.5%)

== History ==
=== Polling districts ===
According to the federal gazette issued on 13 July 2023, the Kulim-Bandar Baharu constituency is divided into 41 polling districts.

State constituency	Polling Districts	Code	Location
Kulim (N35)	Kampung Tebuan	018/35/01	SK Seri Lindungan Raja
Kulim (N35)	Ulu Mahang	018/35/02	SMK Mahang
Kulim (N35)	Pekan Mahang	018/35/03	SK Mahang
Kulim (N35)	Ladang Sungai Dingin	018/35/04	SK Ladang Dublin
Kulim (N35)	FELDA Gunong Bongsu	018/35/05	SK Gunung Bongsu
Kulim (N35)	Karangan	018/35/06	SJK (C) Khai Min
Kulim (N35)	Terap	018/35/07	SK Terap
Kulim (N35)	Ladang Sungai Ular	018/35/08	SJK (T) Ladang Sungai Ular
Kulim (N35)	Ladang Anak Kulim	018/35/09	SJK (T) Ladang Anak Kulim
Kulim (N35)	Jalan Tunku Bendahara	018/35/10	SJK (C) Chong Cheng
Kulim (N35)	Taman Kenari	018/35/11	SK Taman Kenari
Kulim (N35)	Taman Tunku Putra	018/35/12	SMK Taman Kenari
Kulim (N35)	Taman Seri Kulim	018/35/13	SK Kulim
Kulim (N35)	Pekan Kulim	018/35/14	SMA Tarbiyyah Diniah
Kulim (N35)	Jalan Tunku Putra	018/35/15	SMK St. Patrick
Kulim (N35)	Jalan Ibrahim	018/35/16	SMJK Chio Min
Kulim (N35)	Bukit Awi	018/35/17	SK Sri Kulim
Kulim (N35)	Taman Bersatu	018/35/18	SK Taman Jelutong
Kulim (N35)	Ayer Merah	018/35/19	Kolej MARA Kulim
Kulim (N35)	Taman Anggerik	018/35/20	Kolej Vokasional Kulim
Kulim (N35)	Junjong	018/35/21	SK Junjong
Kulim (N35)	Padang Penyangga	018/35/22	SJK (C) Sin Min
Kulim (N35)	Durian Burong	018/35/23	SJK (T) Ladang Somee
Bandar Baharu (N36)	Sungai Batu	018/36/01	SK Sungai Batu
Bandar Baharu (N36)	Sungai Taka	018/36/02	SK Sungai Taka
Bandar Baharu (N36)	Sungai Tengas	018/36/03	SMK Selama
Bandar Baharu (N36)	Selama	018/36/04	SK Selama
Bandar Baharu (N36)	Batu Lintang	018/36/05	SK Sungai Salleh
Bandar Baharu (N36)	Kampung Ee Guan	018/36/06	SMK Serdang Baru
Bandar Baharu (N36)	Pekan Serdang	018/36/07	SK Jalan Selama
Bandar Baharu (N36)	Batu 16	018/36/08	SK Dato' Hj Zainuddin
Bandar Baharu (N36)	Relau	018/36/09	SK Relau
Bandar Baharu (N36)	Sungai Kechil Illir	018/36/10	SK Sungai Kechil Ilir
Bandar Baharu (N36)	Ayer Puteh	018/36/11	SK Ayer Puteh
Bandar Baharu (N36)	Telok Sera	018/36/12	SK Lubok Buntar
Bandar Baharu (N36)	Pekan Lubok Buntar	018/36/13	SJK (C) Poay Chai
Bandar Baharu (N36)	Kerat Telunjok	018/36/14	SK Permatang Kerat Telunjuk
Bandar Baharu (N36)	Sungai Kechil Ulu	018/36/15	SK Sungai Kechil Ulu
Bandar Baharu (N36)	Parit Nibong	018/36/16	Pusat Sumber KEMAS Kegiatan Desa Parit Nibong; Kompleks / Pejabat Penghulu Mukim Bagan Samak
Bandar Baharu (N36)	Permatang Pasir	018/36/17	SK Permatang Pasir
Bandar Baharu (N36)	Bandar Baharu	018/36/18	SK Bandar Baharu

=== Representation history ===
Members of the Parliament for Kulim-Bandar Baharu
Parliament	No	Years	Member	Party	Vote Share
Constituency created from Kedah Selatan
Kulim-Bandar Bahru
Parliament of the Federation of Malaya
1st	P014	1959–1963	Tan Tye Chek (陈大泽)	Alliance (MCA)	11,317; 69.59%
Parliament of Malaysia
1st	P014	1963–1964	Tan Tye Chek (陈大泽)	Alliance (MCA)	11,317; 69.59%
2nd	P014	1964–1969	Tai Kuan Yang (戴观阳)	Alliance (MCA)	15,077; 68.77%
		1969–1971	Parliament was suspended		
3rd	P014	1971–1973	Tai Kuan Yang (戴观阳)	Alliance (MCA)	14,381; 69.28%
3rd	P014	1973–1974	Tai Kuan Yang (戴观阳)	BN (MCA)	14,381; 69.28%
4th	P015	1974–1978	Azahari Md. Taib (ازاهاري مد. طائب)	BN (UMNO)	13,888; 72.76%
5th	P015	1978–1982	Abdul Kadir Sheikh Fadzir (عبدالقادر بن شيخ فاضل)	BN (UMNO)	16,360; 72.04%
6th	P015	1982–1986	Abdul Kadir Sheikh Fadzir (عبدالقادر بن شيخ فاضل)	BN (UMNO)	17,097; 64.48%
Kulim-Bandar Baharu
7th	P016	1986–1990	Abdul Kadir Sheikh Fadzir (عبدالقادر بن شيخ فاضل)	BN (UMNO)	21,043; 73.91%
8th	P016	1990–1995	Abdul Kadir Sheikh Fadzir (عبدالقادر بن شيخ فاضل)	BN (UMNO)	23,149; 70.90%
9th	P018	1995–1999	Abdul Kadir Sheikh Fadzir (عبدالقادر بن شيخ فاضل)	BN (UMNO)	22,455; 73.36%
10th	P018	1999–2004	Abdul Kadir Sheikh Fadzir (عبدالقادر بن شيخ فاضل)	BN (UMNO)	20,764; 62.05%
11th	P018	2004–2008	Abdul Kadir Sheikh Fadzir (عبدالقادر بن شيخ فاضل)	BN (UMNO)	22,556; 60.77%
12th	P018	2008–2010	Zulkifli Noordin (ذوالکيفلي نورالدين)	PR (PKR)	22,255; 57.17%
12th	P018	2010–2013	Zulkifli Noordin (ذوالکيفلي نورالدين)	Independent	22,255; 57.17%
13th	P018	2013–2018	Abdul Aziz Sheikh Fadzir (عبد. عزيز شيخ فاذر)	BN (UMNO)	26,782; 51.81%
14th	P018	2018–2022	Saifuddin Nasution Ismail ( سيف الدين ناسوتيون بن اسماعيل)	PH (PKR)	22,159; 42.62%
15th	P018	2022–present	Roslan Hashim (روسلن هشيم)	PN (BERSATU)	34,469; 49.00%

=== State constituency ===
Parliamentary constituency	State constituency						
Parliamentary constituency	1955–1959*	1959–1974	1974–1986	1986–1995	1995–2004	2004–2018	2018–present
Kulim-Bandar Baharu				Bandar Baharu			
Kulim-Bandar Baharu				Kulim			
Kulim-Bandar Bahru		Bandar Bahru					
Kulim-Bandar Bahru		Kulim					
Kulim-Bandar Bahru			Serdang				

=== Historical boundaries ===
State Constituency	Area					
State Constituency	1959	1974	1986	1994	2003	2018
Bandar Baharu	Lubok Buntar; Selama; Serdang; Sungai Taka; Relau		Lubok Buntar; Selama; Serdang; Sungai Taka; Relau			
Kulim	FELDA Gunong Bongsu; Kulim; Mahang; Sungai Ular; Taman Kenari	FELDA Gunong Bongsu; Kulim; Mahang; Taman Kenari; Terap	FELDA Gunong Bongsu; Kulim; Mahang; Sungai Ular; Taman Kenari			
Serdang		Bandar Baharu; Lubok Buntar; Selama; Sungai Taka; Relau				

=== Current state assembly members ===
No.	State Constituency	Member	Coalition (Party)
N35	Kulim	Wong Chia Zhen	PN (GERAKAN)
N36	Bandar Baharu	Mohd Suffian Yusoff	PN (PAS)

=== Local governments & postcodes ===
No.	State Constituency	Local Government	Postcode
N35	Kulim	Kulim Municipal Council	09700 Karangan; 09000 Kulim; 09800, 09810 Serdang; 14290, 14390, 34950 Bandar Baharu
N36	Bandar Baharu	Bandar Baharu District Council	09700 Karangan; 09000 Kulim; 09800, 09810 Serdang; 14290, 14390, 34950 Bandar Baharu

== Election results ==
Malaysian general election, 2022: Kulim-Bandar Baharu
Party	Candidate	Votes	%	∆%
PN	Roslan Hashim	34,469	49.00	▲49.00
PH	Saifuddin Nasution Ismail	21,408	30.44	▲30.44
BN	Muhar Hussain	13,872	19.72	▼13.95
PEJUANG	Muhamad Yusrizal Yusuf	591	0.84	▲0.84
Total valid votes		70,340	100.00	
Total rejected ballots		927		
Unreturned ballots		349		
Turnout		71,616	79.40	▼3.78
Registered electors		90,141		
Majority		13,061	18.56	▲9.61
PN gain from PKR		Swing		?
Source(s) https://lom.agc.gov.my/ilims/upload/portal/akta/outputp/1753260/PUB%20606%20(2022).pdf

Malaysian general election, 2018: Kulim-Bandar Baharu
Party	Candidate	Votes	%	∆%
PKR	Saifuddin Nasution Ismail	22,159	42.62	▼5.57
BN	Abdul Aziz Sheikh Fadzir	18,299	33.67	▼18.14
PAS	Abdul Raman Abdul Razak	12,885	23.71	▲23.71
Total valid votes		54,343	100.00	
Total rejected ballots		894		
Unreturned ballots		153		
Turnout		55,390	83.18	▼3.45
Registered electors		66,587		
Majority		4,860	8.95	▲5.33
PKR gain from BN		Swing		?
Source(s) "His Majesty's Government Gazette - Notice of Contested Election, Parliament for the State of Kedah [P.U. (B) 233/2018]" (PDF). Attorney General's Chambers of Malaysia. 3 May 2018. "Federal Government Gazette - Results of Contested Election and Statements of the Poll after the Official Addition of Votes, Parliamentary Constituencies for the State of Kedah [P.U. (B) 307/2018]" (PDF). Attorney General's Chambers of Malaysia. 28 May 2018.

Malaysian general election, 2013: Kulim-Bandar Baharu
Party	Candidate	Votes	%	∆%
BN	Abdul Aziz Sheikh Fadzir	26,782	51.81	▲8.98
PKR	Saifuddin Nasution Ismail	24,911	48.19	▼8.98
Total valid votes		51,693	100.00	
Total rejected ballots		839		
Unreturned ballots		234		
Turnout		52,766	86.63	▲9.35
Registered electors		60,910		
Majority		1,871	3.62	▼10.72
BN gain from PKR		Swing		?
Source(s) "Federal Government Gazette - Notice of Contested Election, Parliament for the State of Kedah [P.U. (B) 170/2013]" (PDF). Attorney General's Chambers of Malaysia. 26 April 2013. Archived from the original (PDF) on 2019-12-29. "Federal Government Gazette - Results of Contested Election and Statements of the Poll after the Official Addition of Votes, Parliamentary Constituencies for the State of Kedah [P.U. (B) 211/2013]" (PDF). Attorney General's Chambers of Malaysia. 22 May 2013.

Malaysian general election, 2008: Kulim-Bandar Baharu
Party	Candidate	Votes	%	∆%
PKR	Zulkifli Noordin	22,255	57.17	▲17.94
BN	Abdul Aziz Sheikh Fadzir	16,672	42.83	▼17.94
Total valid votes		38,927	100.00	
Total rejected ballots		1,022		
Unreturned ballots		233		
Turnout		40,182	77.28	▼0.26
Registered electors		51,995		
Majority		5,583	14.34	▼7.20
PKR gain from BN		Swing		?

Malaysian general election, 2004: Kulim-Bandar Baharu
Party	Candidate	Votes	%	∆%
BN	Abdul Kadir Sheikh Fadzir	22,556	60.77	▼1.28
PKR	Alwi Mohd Yusop	14,558	39.23	▲1.28
Total valid votes		37,114	100.00	
Total rejected ballots		1,181		
Unreturned ballots		494		
Turnout		38,789	77.54	▲3.69
Registered electors		50,024		
Majority		7,998	21.54	▼2.56
BN hold		Swing		

Malaysian general election, 1999: Kulim-Bandar Baharu
Party	Candidate	Votes	%	∆%
BN	Abdul Kadir Sheikh Fadzir	20,764	62.05	▼11.31
PKR	Syeikh Azmi Ahmad	12,697	37.95	▲37.95
Total valid votes		33,461	100.00	
Total rejected ballots		898		
Unreturned ballots		422		
Turnout		34,781	73.85	▲3.25
Registered electors		47,096		
Majority		8,067	24.10	▼22.62
BN hold		Swing		

Malaysian general election, 1995: Kulim-Bandar Baharu
Party	Candidate	Votes	%	∆%
BN	Abdul Kadir Sheikh Fadzir	22,455	73.36	▲2.46
S46	Abdul Aziz Mohamed	8,153	26.64	▼2.46
Total valid votes		30,608	100.00	
Total rejected ballots		1,491		
Unreturned ballots		339		
Turnout		32,438	70.60	▼3.63
Registered electors		45,946		
Majority		14,302	46.72	▲4.92
BN hold		Swing		

Malaysian general election, 1990: Kulim-Bandar Baharu
Party	Candidate	Votes	%	∆%
BN	Abdul Kadir Sheikh Fadzir	23,149	70.90	▼3.01
S46	Hashim Endut	9,499	29.10	▲29.10
Total valid votes		32,648	100.00	
Total rejected ballots		1,051		
Unreturned ballots		0		
Turnout		33,699	74.23	▲4.47
Registered electors		45,399		
Majority		13,650	41.80	▼6.02
BN hold		Swing		

Malaysian general election, 1986: Kulim-Bandar Baharu
Party	Candidate	Votes	%	∆%
BN	Abdul Kadir Sheikh Fadzir	21,043	73.91	▲9.43
PAS	Hassan Razak	7,429	26.09	▲7.83
Total valid votes		28,472	100.00	
Total rejected ballots		887		
Unreturned ballots		0		
Turnout		29,359	69.76	▼5.48
Registered electors		42,084		
Majority		13,614	47.82	▲1.60
BN hold		Swing		

Malaysian general election, 1982: Kulim-Bandar Bahru
Party	Candidate	Votes	%	∆%
BN	Abdul Kadir Sheikh Fadzir	17,097	64.48	▼7.56
PAS	Mohamed Salleh Mohamad	4,843	18.26	▼9.70
DAP	Lee Chuan Sam @ Lee Chian Sum	4,576	17.26	▲17.26
Total valid votes		26,516	100.00	
Total rejected ballots		872		
Unreturned ballots		0		
Turnout		27,388	75.24	▲1.04
Registered electors		36,399		
Majority		12,254	46.22	▲2.14
BN hold		Swing		

Malaysian general election, 1978: Kulim-Bandar Bahru
Party	Candidate	Votes	%	∆%
BN	Abdul Kadir Sheikh Fadzir	16,360	72.04	▼0.72
PAS	Abdul Aziz Kassim	6,351	27.96	▲27.96
Total valid votes		22,711	100.00	
Total rejected ballots		897		
Unreturned ballots		0		
Turnout		23,608	74.20	▲2.39
Registered electors		31,816		
Majority		10,009	44.08	▼1.44
BN hold		Swing		

Malaysian general election, 1974: Kulim-Bandar Bahru
Party	Candidate	Votes	%	∆%
BN	Azahari Md. Taib	13,888	72.76	▲72.76
Independent	Abdul Aziz Kassim	5,200	27.24	▲27.24
Total valid votes		19,088	100.00	
Total rejected ballots		975		
Unreturned ballots		0		
Turnout		20,063	71.81	▼1.75
Registered electors		27,940		
Majority		8,688	45.52	▲6.96
BN hold		Swing		?

Malaysian general election, 1969: Kulim-Bandar Bahru
Party	Candidate	Votes	%	∆%
Alliance	Tai Kuan Yang	14,381	69.28	▲0.51
PMIP	Khatib Shorbaini Hassan	6,378	30.72	▲20.41
Total valid votes		20,759	100.00	
Total rejected ballots		1,512		
Unreturned ballots		0		
Turnout		22,271	73.56	▼1.64
Registered electors		30,274		
Majority		8,003	38.56	▼9.30
Alliance hold		Swing		

Malaysian general election, 1964: Kulim-Bandar Bahru
Party	Candidate	Votes	%	∆%
Alliance	Tai Kuan Yang	15,077	68.77	▼0.82
Socialist Front	A. K. Veeman Kanusamy	4,585	20.91	▼9.50
PMIP	Mohamed Amin Che Mat	2,261	10.31	▲10.31
Total valid votes		21,923	100.00	
Total rejected ballots		887		
Unreturned ballots		0		
Turnout		22,810	75.20	▲3.82
Registered electors		30,332		
Majority		10,492	47.86	▲8.68
Alliance hold		Swing		

Malayan general election, 1959: Kulim-Bandar Bahru
Party	Candidate	Votes	%
Alliance	Tan Tye Chek	11,317	69.59
Socialist Front	Choong Ah Fong	4,946	30.41
Total valid votes		16,263	100.00
Total rejected ballots		344	
Unreturned ballots		0	
Turnout		16,607	71.38
Registered electors		23,264	
Majority		6,371	39.18
This was a new constituency created.
