= Members of the Dewan Rakyat, 7th Malaysian Parliament =

7th Parliament of Malaysia
←	6th Parliament	8th Parliament	→

Overview
- Legislative body: Parliament of Malaysia
- Jurisdiction: Malaysia
- Meeting place: Malaysian Houses of Parliament
- Term: 6 October 1986 – 5 October 1990
- Election: 1986 general election
- Government: Third Mahathir cabinet
- Website: www.parlimen.gov.my

Dewan Rakyat
- Members: 177
- Speaker: Mohamed Zahir Ismail
- Deputy Speaker: D. P. Vijandran (until 23 February 1990); Mohamed Amin Daud; Ong Tee Keat
- Secretary: Azizul Rahman Abdul Aziz (until 1988); Wan Zahir Sheikh Abdul Rahman
- Prime Minister: Mahathir Mohamad
- Leader of the Opposition: Lim Kit Siang
- Party control: Barisan Nasional

Sovereign
- Yang di-Pertuan Agong: Tuanku Iskandar (until 25 April 1989); Tuanku Azlan Shah

Sessions
- 1st: 6 October 1986 – 7 December 1987
- 2nd: 7 March 1988 – 6 December 1988
- 3rd: 6 March 1989 – 15 December 1989
- 4th: 26 February 1990 – 26 June 1990

This is a list of the members of the Dewan Rakyat (House of Representatives) of the 7th Parliament of Malaysia, elected in 1986.

== Composition ==
State	# of Seats	UMNO Seats	MCA Seats	MIC Seats	PAS Seats	Gerakan Seats	PPP Seats	DAP Seats	PSRM Seats	SDP Seats	NASMA Seats	HAMIM Seats	BERJAYA Seats	PBS Seats	USNO Seats	PBB Seats	PBDS Seats	SNAP Seats	SUPP Seats	MOMOGUN Seats	PLUS Seats	IND Seats
Perlis	2	2																				
Kedah	14	12	2																			
Kelantan	13	11			1							1										
Terengganu	8	8																				
Penang	11	4				1		6														
Perak	23	11	3	2		3		4														
Pahang	10	7	3																			
Selangor	14	7	3	2				2														
Federal Territory of Kuala Lumpur	7	2				1		4														
Negeri Sembilan	7	4		1				2														
Malacca	5	3	1					1														
Johor	18	12	5	1																		
Federal Territory of Labuan	1																					1
Sabah	20							4						10	5							1
Sarawak	24							1								8	5	4	4			2
Seats won	177	83	17	6	1	5	0	24	0	0	0	1	0	10	5	8	5	4	4	0	0	4
Seats contested	431	84	32	6	98	9	0	64	4	19	4	2	8	14	6	8	5	5	7	2	2	52

== Elected members by state ==
Shortcut:

Perlis | Kedah | Kelantan | Terengganu | Pulau Pinang | Perak | Pahang | Selangor | Kuala Lumpur | Negeri Sembilan | Melaka | Johor | Labuan | Sabah | Sarawak

Unless noted otherwise, the MPs served the entire term of the parliament (from 6 October 1986 until 4 October 1990).

=== Perlis ===
No.	Federal Constituency	Member	Party
BN 2
P001	Kangar	Mohd Radzi Sheikh Ahmad	BN (UMNO)
P002	Arau	Shahidan Kassim	BN (UMNO)

=== Kedah ===
No.	Federal Constituency	Member	Party
BN 14
P003	Jerlun-Langkawi	Sanusi Junid	BN (UMNO)
P004	Kubang Pasu	Mahathir Mohamad	BN (UMNO)
P005	Padang Terap	Affifudin Omar	BN (UMNO)
P006	Kota Setar	Abdul Hadi Derani	BN (UMNO)
P007	Alor Setar	Oo Gin Sun	BN (MCA)
P008	Kuala Kedah	Mohammad Abu Bakar Rautin Ibrahim	BN (UMNO)
P009	Pendang	Othman Abdul	BN (UMNO)
P010	Jerai	Ghazali Ahmad	BN (UMNO)
P011	Merbok	Abdul Daim Zainuddin	BN (UMNO)
P012	Sik	Zainol Abidin Johari	BN (UMNO)
P013	Baling	Raja Ariffin Raja Sulaiman	BN (UMNO)
P014	Sungai Petani	Abdul Manaf Ahmad	BN (UMNO)
P015	Padang Serai	Chew Kam Hoy	BN (MCA)
P016	Kulim-Bandar Baharu	Abdul Kadir Sheikh Fadzir	BN (UMNO)

=== Kelantan ===
No.	Federal Constituency	Member	Party
BN 12 | PAS 1
P017	Tumpat	Dusuki Ahmad	BN (UMNO)
P018	Pengkalan Chepa	Nik Abdullah Arshad	PAS
P019	Kota Bharu	Tengku Ahmad Rithauddeen Tengku Ismail	BN (UMNO)
P020	Pasir Mas	Ibrahim Ali	BN (UMNO)
P021	Rantau Panjang	Mohamed Yaacob	BN (UMNO)
P022	Nilam Puri	Mohamed Ali	BN (UMNO)
P023	Bachok	Mohd. Zain Abdullah	BN (HAMIM)
P024	Pasir Puteh	Wan Omar Wan Majid	BN (UMNO)
P025	Kok Lanas	Abdullah Ahmad	BN (UMNO)
P026	Tanah Merah	Hashim Safin	BN (UMNO)
P027	Machang	Mohd. Kassim Ahmed	BN (UMNO)
P028	Kuala Krai	Mohamed Isa	BN (UMNO)
P029	Gua Musang	Tengku Razaleigh Hamzah	BN (UMNO)

=== Terengganu ===
No.	Federal Constituency	Member	Party
BN 8
P030	Besut	Zakaria Abdul Rahman	BN (UMNO)
P031	Setiu	Mohamed Yusof Mohamed Noor	BN (UMNO)
P032	Kuala Nerus	Ibrahim Azmi Hassan	BN (UMNO)
P033	Kuala Terengganu	Zubir Embong	BN (UMNO)
P034	Marang	Abdul Rahman Bakar	BN (UMNO)
P035	Hulu Terengganu	Alias Md. Ali	BN (UMNO)
P036	Dungun	Awang Abdul Jabar	BN (UMNO)
P037	Kemaman	Ismail Said	BN (UMNO)

=== Penang ===
No.	Federal Constituency	Member	Party
DAP 6 | BN 5
P038	Kepala Batas	Abdullah Ahmad Badawi	BN (UMNO)
P039	Tasek Gelugor	Mohammed Yusoff Abdul Latib	BN (UMNO)
P040	Bagan	Teoh Teik Huat	DAP
P041	Permatang Pauh	Anwar Ibrahim	BN (UMNO)
P042	Bukit Mertajam	Chian Heng Kai	DAP
P043	Nibong Tebal	Goh Cheng Teik	BN (Gerakan)
P044	Bukit Bendera	Gooi Hock Seng	DAP
P045	Tanjong	Lim Kit Siang	DAP
P046	Jelutong	Karpal Singh	DAP
P047	Bayan Baru	Peter Paul Dason	DAP
P048	Balik Pulau	Mohamad Subky Abdul Raof	BN (UMNO)

=== Perak ===
No.	Federal Constituency	Member	Party
BN 19 | DAP 4
P049	Gerik	Tajol Rosli Mohd Ghazali	BN (UMNO)
P050	Larut	Mohd. Zihin Mohd. Hassan	BN (UMNO)
P051	Parit Buntar	Abdul Raman Suliman	BN (UMNO)
P052	Bagan Serai	Zainal Abidin Zin	BN (UMNO)
P053	Bukit Gantang	Abdullah Fadzil Che Wan	BN (UMNO)
P054	Taiping	Paul Leong Khee Seong	BN (Gerakan)
P055	Tasek Chenderoh	Saidin Mat Piah	BN (UMNO)
P056	Sungai Siput	Samy Vellu	BN (MIC)
P057	Tambun	Yahaya Mohd. Shafie	BN (UMNO)
P058	Pasir Pinji	Lau Dak Kee	DAP
P059	Ipoh	P. Patto	DAP
P060	Batu Gajah	Ting Chek Ming	DAP
P061	Kuala Kangsar	Rafidah Aziz	BN (UMNO)
P062	Beruas	Lim Keng Yaik	BN (Gerakan)
P063	Parit	Nasruddin Alang Saidin	BN (UMNO)
P064	Gopeng	Ting Chew Peh from 16 May 1987 (Note: Ting was elected to Parliament in the Gopeng by-election, 1987 following the resignation of incumbent member, Tan Koon Swan due to Pan-Electric Industries scandal and deposit-taking co-operative scandal.)	BN (MCA)
P064	Gopeng	Tan Koon Swan until 3 April 1987	BN (MCA)
P065	Kampar	Ngoi Thiam Woh	DAP
P066	Tapah	M. G. Pandithan	BN (MIC)
P067	Pasir Salak	Megat Junid Megat Ayub	BN (UMNO)
P068	Lumut	Ng Cheng Kuai	BN (MCA)
P069	Bagan Datok	Mohamed Jamrah	BN (UMNO)
P070	Telok Intan	Ong Tin Kim	BN (Gerakan)
P071	Tanjong Malim	Loke Yuen Yow	BN (MCA)

=== Pahang ===
No.	Federal Constituency	Member	Party
BN 10
P072	Lipis	Wang Choon Wing	BN (MCA)
P073	Raub	Teng Gaik Kwan	BN (MCA)
P074	Jerantut	Wan Abu Bakar Wan Mohamed	BN (UMNO)
P075	Kuantan	Adam Abdul Kadir	BN (UMNO)
P076	Pekan	Najib Razak	BN (UMNO)
P077	Maran	Muhammad Abdullah	BN (UMNO)
P078	Mentakab	Siti Zaharah Sulaiman	BN (UMNO)
P079	Bentong	Lim Ah Lek from 13 May 1989 (Note: Lim was elected to Parliament in the Bentong by-election, 1989 following the death of incumbent member, Chan Siang Sun.)	BN (MCA)
P079	Bentong	Chan Siang Sun until 21 March 1989	BN (MCA)
P080	Temerloh	Sabbaruddin Chik	BN (UMNO)
P081	Rompin	Mohamed Amin Daud (Deputy Speaker)	BN (UMNO)

=== Selangor ===
No.	Federal Constituency	Member	Party
BN 12 | DAP 2
P082	Sabak Bernam	Hussein Taib	BN (UMNO)
P083	Tanjong Karang	Kamaruzaman Ahmad	BN (UMNO)
P084	Hulu Selangor	Subramaniam Sinniah	BN (MIC)
P085	Kuala Selangor	Abu Hassan Omar	BN (UMNO)
P086	Kapar	D. P. Vijandran (Note: In early 1990, the former Dewan Rakyat deputy speaker, D. P. Vijandran was forced to resign following a sex videotape controversy.) (Deputy Speaker)	BN (MIC)
P087	Selayang	Zaleha Ismail	BN (UMNO)
P088	Ampang Jaya	Ong Tee Keat from 28 January 1989 (Note: Ong was elected as the Deputy Speaker on 11 June 1990 following the resignation of D. P. Vijandran.) (Note: Lim Ann Koon was originally elected to serve in this constituency but announced the resignation in 1989. Ong was elected to Parliament in the Ampang Jaya by-election, 1989 defeating former Menteri Besar of Selangor, Harun Idris.) (Deputy Speaker)	BN (MCA)
P088	Ampang Jaya	Lim Ann Koon until 9 December 1988	BN (MCA)
P089	Hulu Langat	Lee Kim Sai	BN (MCA)
P090	Petaling Jaya	Eng Seng Chai	DAP
P091	Puchong	V. David	DAP
P092	Shah Alam	Rahmah Othman	BN (UMNO)
P093	Klang	Ng Cheng Kiat	BN (MCA)
P094	Kuala Langat	Basri Bajuri	BN (UMNO)
P095	Sepang	Mohd. Sharif Jajang	BN (UMNO)

=== Federal Territory of Kuala Lumpur ===
No.	Federal Constituency	Member	Party
DAP 4 | BN 3
P096	Kepong	Tan Seng Giaw	DAP
P097	Batu	Alexander Lee Yu Lung	BN (Gerakan)
P098	Titiwangsa	Suleiman Mohamed	BN (UMNO)
P099	Bukit Bintang	Lee Lam Thye	DAP
P100	Lembah Pantai	Abdul Razak Abu Samah	BN (UMNO)
P101	Seputeh	Liew Ah Kim	DAP
P102	Sungai Besi	Tan Kok Wai	DAP

=== Negeri Sembilan ===
No.	Federal Constituency	Member	Party
BN 5 | DAP 2
P103	Jelebu	Rais Yatim	BN (UMNO)
P104	Jempol	Mohd. Khalid Mohd. Yunus	BN (UMNO)
P105	Tampin	Mohd. Noh Rajab	BN (UMNO)
P106	Kuala Pilah	Napsiah Omar	BN (UMNO)
P107	Seremban	Chen Man Hin	DAP
P108	Rasah	Hu Sepang	DAP
P109	Telok Kemang	K. Pathmanaban	BN (MIC)

=== Malacca ===
No.	Federal Constituency	Member	Party
BN 4 | DAP 1
P110	Alor Gajah	Mohd. Adib Mohd. Adam	BN (UMNO)
P111	Selandar	Kok Wee Kiat	BN (MCA)
P112	Batu Berendam	Mohd. Tamrin Abdul Ghafar	BN (UMNO)
P113	Kota Melaka	Lim Guan Eng	DAP
P114	Jasin	Abdul Ghafar Baba	BN (UMNO)

=== Johor ===
No.	Federal Constituency	Member	Party
BN 17 | IND 1
P115	Segamat	Subramaniam Sinniah	BN (MIC)
P116	Ledang	Abdul Ghani Othman	BN (UMNO)
P117	Pagoh	Ahmad Omar	BN (UMNO)
P118	Labis	Ling Liong Sik	BN (MCA)
P119	Mersing	Abdul Ajib Ahmad	BN (UMNO)
P120	Kluang	Ling Chooi Sieng	BN (MCA)
P121	Parit Sulong	Shariffah Dorah Syed Mohammed	BN (UMNO)
P122	Bakri	Chua Jui Meng	BN (MCA)
P123	Muar	Mohamed Sam Sailan	BN (UMNO)
P124	Sri Gading	Mustaffa Mohammad	BN (UMNO)
P125	Batu Pahat	Daud Taha	BN (UMNO)
P126	Sungai Benut	Mohamed Tawfik Ismail	BN (UMNO)
P127	Senai	Woon See Chin	BN (MCA)
P128	Kota Tinggi	Musa Hitam	BN (UMNO)
P129	Tebrau	Siti Zainabon Abu Bakar	BN (UMNO)
P130	Johor Bahru	Shahrir Abdul Samad recontest, won on 25 August 1988 (Note: Shahrir was sacked that year in the events leading up to the 1988 Malaysian constitutional crisis and Tengku Razaleigh Hamzah's challenge to Prime Minister and UMNO President Mahathir Mohamad. In 1988, Shahrir resigned from his Parliamentary seat, and ran for re-election in the resulting by-election as an independent. A year later, he rejoined UMNO, while Razaleigh went on to form Semangat 46.)	BN (UMNO)
P130	Johor Bahru	Shahrir Abdul Samad recontest, won on 25 August 1988	IND
P131	Pulai	Mohamed Rahmat	BN (UMNO)
P132	Pontian	Law Lai Heng	BN (MCA)

=== Federal Territory of Labuan ===
No.	Federal Constituency	Member	Party
IND 1
P133	Labuan	Abdol Mulok Awang Damit	IND

=== Sabah ===
No.	Federal Constituency	Member	Party
BN 15 | DAP 4 | IND 1
P134	Marudu	Joe Ojihi Supiring	IND
P135	Bandau	Henry Madatang Morejal	BN (PBS)
P136	Kota Belud	Maidom Pansai	BN (PBS)
P137	Tuaran	Kalakau Untol	BN (USNO)
P138	Kinabalu	Kasitah Gaddam	BN (USNO)
P139	Jambongan	Metah Asang	BN (PBS)
P140	Sandakan	Fung Ket Wing	DAP
P141	Kinabatangan	Pitting Mohd. Ali	BN (USNO)
P142	Keningau	Joseph Pairin Kitingan	BN (PBS)
P143	Penampang	Bernard Giluk Dompok	BN (PBS)
P144	Gaya	Gerard Math Lee Min	DAP
P145	Tanjong Aru	Hsing Yin Shean	DAP
P146	Papar	Osu Sukam	BN (USNO)
P147	Kimanis	Nurnikman Abdullah	BN (USNO)
P148	Limbawang	Mustapha Harun from 18 April 1987 (Note: Mustapha was elected to Parliament in the Limbawang by-election, 1987 following the death of Abdul Hamid Mustapha.)	BN (USNO)
P148	Limbawang	Abdul Hamid Mustapha until 21 February 1987	BN (USNO)
P149	Padas	Kadoh Agundong	BN (PBS)
P150	Pensiangan	Taimin Lumaing	BN (PBS)
P151	Tawau	Samson Chin Chee Tsu	DAP
P152	Silam	Railey Jeffrey	BN (USNO)
P153	Semporna	Sakaran Dandai	BN (USNO)

=== Sarawak ===
No.	Federal Constituency	Member	Party
BN 21 | DAP 1 | IND 2
P154	Mas Gading	Patau Rubis	BN (SNAP)
P155	Bandar Kuching	Sim Kwang Yang	DAP
P156	Santubong	Sulaiman Daud	BN (PBB)
P157	Samarahan	Abdul Taib Mahmud	BN (PBB)
P158	Padawan	Stephen Yong Kuet Tze	BN (SUPP)
P159	Serian	Lainus Andrew Luwak	IND
P160	Simunjan	Bujang Ulis	BN (PERMAS)
P161	Batang Lupar	Daniel Tajem Miri	BN (PBDS)
P162	Lubok Antu	Jawah Gerang from 4 April 1987 (Note: Jawah was elected to Parliament in the Lubok Antu by-election, 1987 following the death of Andrew Janggi Muyang.)	BN (PBDS)
P162	Lubok Antu	Andrew Janggi Muyang until 9 February 1987	BN (PBDS)
P163	Betong	Douglas Uggah Embas	BN (PBB)
P164	Saratok	Peter Tinggom Kamarau	BN (SNAP)
P165	Paloh	Abang Abu Bakar Abang Mustapha	BN (PBB)
P166	Sarikei	Law Hieng Ding	BN (SUPP)
P167	Sibu	Tieu Sung Seng	BN (SUPP)
P168	Rajang	Nicholas Munong Ibau	IND
P169	Mukah	Leo Michael Toyad	BN (PBB)
P170	Julau	Thomas Salang Siden	BN (PBDS)
P171	Kanowit	Leo Moggie Irok	BN (PBDS)
P172	Kapit	James Jimbun Pungga	BN (PBB)
P173	Ulu Rajang	Justine Jinggot	BN (SNAP)
P174	Bintulu	Ting Ling Kiew	BN (SNAP)
P175	Lambir	Peter Chin Fah Kui	BN (SUPP)
P176	Baram	Luhat Wan	BN (SNAP)
P177	Bukit Mas	Mutang Tagal	BN (PBB)
