= 1987 Gopeng by-election =

← 1986	16 May 1987	1990 →

P077 seat in the Dewan Rakyat
- Turnout: 21,236
	First party	Second party	Third party
	BN	DAP	IND
Candidate	Ting Chew Peh	Ahmad Nor	Tan Kee Chye
Party	MCA	DAP	Independent
Alliance	BN
Popular vote	12,619	8,096	103
Percentage	60.62%	38.89%	0.49%
MP before election
Tan Koon Swan
BN (MCA)
Elected MP
Ting Chew Peh
BN (MCA)

The Gopeng by-election is a parliamentary by-election that was held on 16 May 1986 in the state of Perak, Malaysia. The Gopeng seat fell vacant following the resignation of its member of parliament Tan Koon Swan of Barisan Nasional (BN) due to imprisonment in Singapore. Tan, who at the time were the president of BN's component party Malaysian Chinese Association (MCA), won the seat in 1986 Malaysian general election against 4 other candidates with majority of 6,135.

Ting Chew Peh of Barisan Nasional, won the by election, defeating Ahmad Nor of Democratic Action Party and independent politician Tan Kee Chye with a majority of 4,523 votes. The constituency had 34,412 voters.

== Nomination ==
SDP have decided to not field candidate due to high deposit required. On Nomination Day, Barisan Nasional nominated former National University of Malaysia lecturer, Dr Ting Chew Peh. Democratic Action Party nominated former Cuepacs president, Ahmad Nor. Tan Kee Chye, businessman join in as independent candidate.

== Results ==
Malaysian general by-election, 16 May 1987: Gopeng Upon the resignation of incumbent, Tan Koon Swan, who was serving a prison term in Singapore.
Party	Candidate	Votes	%	∆%
BN	Ting Chew Peh	12,619	60.62	▲0.25
DAP	Ahmad Nor	8,096	38.89	▲4.96
Independent	Tan Kee Chye	103	0.49	▲0.49
Total valid votes		20,818	100.00	
Total rejected ballots				
Unreturned ballots				
Turnout		21,236	62.20	
Registered electors		34,142		
Majority		4,523	21.73	▼4.71
BN hold		Swing		
