= Bayan Baru (federal constituency) =

Malaysian federal constituency

Bayan Baru (P052)
Penang constituency

Federal constituency
- Legislature: Dewan Rakyat
- MP: Sim Tze Tzin; PH
- Constituency created: 1984
- First contested: 1986
- Last contested: 2022

Demographics
- Population (2020): 188,603
- Electors (2023): 120,645
- Area (km²): 41
- Pop. density (per km²): 4,600.1

Bayan Baru is a federal constituency in Northeast Penang Island District and Southwest Penang Island District, Penang, Malaysia, that has been represented in the Dewan Rakyat since 1986.

The federal constituency was created in the 1984 redistribution and is mandated to return a single member to the Dewan Rakyat under the first past the post voting system.

== Demographics ==
https://live.chinapress.com.my/ge15/parliament/PENANG

Ethnic breakdown of Bayan Baru's electorate as of 2022
1. Chinese (47.8%)
2. Malay (38.9%)
3. Indian (12.2%)
4. Other ethnicities (1.20%)

As of 2020, Bayan Baru has a population of 188,603 people.

Age breakdown of Bayan Baru's electorate as of 2022
1. 18-20 (5.49%)
2. 21-29 (19.0%)
3. 30-39 (21.4%)
4. 40-49 (18.3%)
5. 50-59 (15.4%)
6. 60-69 (12.4%)
7. 70-79 (6.01%)
8. 80-89 (1.63%)
9. above 90 (0.24%)
Gender breakdown of Bayan Baru's electorate as of 2022
1. Male (48.6%)
2. Female (51.4%)

== History ==
=== Polling districts ===
According to the federal gazette issued on 18 July 2023, the Bayan Baru constituency is divided into 25 polling districts.

State constituency	Polling districts	Code	Location
Batu Uban (N35)	Minden Heights	052/35/01	SK Minden Height
Batu Uban (N35)	Universiti Sains	052/35/02	SK Minden Height
Batu Uban (N35)	Batu Uban	052/35/03	Kompleks Pencak Silat Majlis Sukan Negeri Pulau Pinang
Batu Uban (N35)	Sungai Dua	052/36/04	SJK (C) Keong Hoe
Batu Uban (N35)	Bukit Jambol	052/35/05	SJK (C) Min Sin
Batu Uban (N35)	Bukit Gambir	052/35/06	SMK Bukit Gambir
Batu Uban (N35)	Taman Jubilee	052/35/07	SMK Sungai Nibong; SMJK Phor Tay
Batu Uban (N35)	Taman Pekaka	052/36/08	SMK Bukit Jambul
Pantai Jerejak (N36)	Pantai Jerejak	052/36/01	SK Sg Nibong
Pantai Jerejak (N36)	Taman Seri Nibong	052/36/02	SJK (C) Shih Chung Cawangan
Pantai Jerejak (N36)	Pintasan Bahagia	052/36/03	SJK (C) Kwang Hwa
Pantai Jerejak (N36)	Jalan Mahsuri	052/36/04	SK Bayan Baru
Pantai Jerejak (N36)	Bandar Bayan Baru	052/36/05	SMK Raja Tun Uda
Pantai Jerejak (N36)	Jalan Tengah	052/36/06	SMK Raja Tun Uda
Pantai Jerejak (N36)	Lebuh Mahsuri	052/36/07	SK Bayan Baru
Batu Maung (N37)	Kampong Sungai Ara	052/37/01	SK Sungai Ara
Batu Maung (N37)	Taman Desa Ara	052/37/02	SMK Sungai Ara; SJK (T) Sungai Ara
Batu Maung (N37)	Sungai Tiram	052/37/03	SJK (C) Chung San
Batu Maung (N37)	Sungai Kluang	052/37/04	SK Seri Permai
Batu Maung (N37)	Kampong Naran	052/37/05	SJK (C) Wen Khai
Batu Maung (N37)	Permatang Damar Laut	052/37/06	SK Permatang Damar Laut
Batu Maung (N37)	Batu Maung	052/37/07	SK Batu Maung
Batu Maung (N37)	Taman Sri Bayan	052/37/08	SK Mutiara Perdana
Batu Maung (N37)	Taman Bukit Gedung	052/37/09	SK Seri Permai
Batu Maung (N37)	Teluk Tempoyak	052/37/10	SMK Batu Maung

=== Representation history ===
Members of Parliament for Bayan Baru
Parliament	No	Years	Member	Party	Vote Share
Constituency created from Balik Pulau, Bukit Bendera and Jelutong
7th	P047	1986–1990	Peter Paul Dason (பீட்டர் பால் டேசன்)	DAP	19,610; 48.98%
8th	P047	1990–1995	Ahmad Nor (أحمد نور)	GR (DAP)	25,853; 52.37%
9th	P050	1995–1999	Wong Kam Hoong (黄锦鸿)	BN (MCA)	32,190; 55.32%
10th	P050	1999–2004	Wong Kam Hoong (黄锦鸿)	BN (MCA)	35,762; 57.64%
11th	P052	2004–2008	Wong Kam Hoong (黄锦鸿)	BN (MCA)	29,430; 73.56%
12th	P052	2008–2010	Zahrain Mohamed Hashim (زهرين محمد هاشم)	PR (PKR)	27,618; 62.47%
12th	P052	2010–2013	Zahrain Mohamed Hashim (زهرين محمد هاشم)	Independent	27,618; 62.47%
13th	P052	2013–2015	Sim Tze Tzin (沈志勤)	PR (PKR)	43,558; 64.24%
13th	P052	2015–2018	Sim Tze Tzin (沈志勤)	PH (PKR)	43,558; 64.24%
14th	P052	2018–2022	Sim Tze Tzin (沈志勤)	PH (PKR)	51,555; 68.88%
15th	P052	2022–present	Sim Tze Tzin (沈志勤)	PH (PKR)	55,209; 61.54%

=== State constituency ===
Parliamentary constituency	State constituency						
Parliamentary constituency	1955–1959*	1959–1974	1974–1986	1986–1995	1995–2004	2004–2018	2018–present
Bayan Baru						Batu Maung	
Bayan Baru				Batu Uban			
Bayan Baru				Bukit Gelugor			
Bayan Baru						Pantai Jerejak	
Bayan Baru				Paya Terubong			

=== Historical boundaries ===
State Constituency	Area			
State Constituency	1984	1994	2003	2018
Batu Maung			Batu Maung; Permatang Damar Laut; Sungai Ara; Sungai Tiram; Teluk Tempoyak	
Batu Uban	Bayan Baru; Bukit Gambir; Gelugor; Minden Hieghts; Relau	Bayan Baru; Bukit Gambir; Gelugor; Minden Hieghts; Sungai Dua	Batu Uban; Bukit Gambir; Minden Hieghts; Sungai Dua; Taman Jubilee	
Bukit Gelugor	Bukit Gelugor; Island Glades; Island Park; Seri Delima; Taman Tun Sardon			
Pantai Jerejak			Bayan Baru; Bayan Indah; Pulau Jerejak; Sungai Nibong; Taman Seri Nibong	
Paya Terubong	Farlim; Happy Valley; Lebuh Rambai; Paya Terubong; Taman Terubong Jaya	Bukit Rimba; Farlim; Happy Valley; Paya Terubong; Relau		

=== Current state assembly members ===
No.	State Constituency	Member	Coalition (Party)
N35	Batu Uban	Kumaresan Aramugam	PH (PKR)
N36	Pantai Jerejak	Fahmi Zainol	PH (PKR)
N37	Batu Maung	Mohamad Abdul Hamid	PH (PKR)

=== Local governments & postcodes ===
No.	State Constituency	Local Government	Postcode
N35	Batu Uban	Penang Island City Council	11700 Gelugor; 11800 USM; 11900 Bayan Lepas; 11960 Batu Maung
N36	Pantai Jerejak	Penang Island City Council	11700 Gelugor; 11800 USM; 11900 Bayan Lepas; 11960 Batu Maung
N37	Batu Maung	Penang Island City Council	11700 Gelugor; 11800 USM; 11900 Bayan Lepas; 11960 Batu Maung

== Election results ==
Malaysian general election, 2022
Party	Candidate	Votes	%	∆%
PH	Sim Tze Tzin	55,209	61.54	▲61.54
PN	Oh Tong Keong	20,307	22.64	▲22.64
BN	Saw Yee Fung	13,377	14.91	▼3.53
Heritage	Jeff Ooi Chuan Aun	440	0.49	▲0.49
Parti Rakyat Malaysia	Ravinder Singh	251	0.28	▲0.28
Independent	Kan Chee Yuen	124	0.14	▲0.14
Total valid votes		89,707	100.00	
Total rejected ballots		1,170		
Unreturned ballots		339		
Turnout		91,217	79.63	▼3.96
Registered electors		119,640		
Majority		34,902	38.90	▼11.54
PH hold		Swing		
Source(s) https://lom.agc.gov.my/ilims/upload/portal/akta/outputp/1753273/PUB609%20(2022).pdf

Malaysian general election, 2018
Party	Candidate	Votes	%	∆%
PKR	Sim Tze Tzin	51,555	68.88	▲4.64
BN	Chuah Seng Guan	13,804	18.44	▼17.32
PAS	Iszuree Ibrahim	8,757	11.70	▲11.70
BERSAMA	David Yim Boon Leong	733	0.98	▲0.98
Total valid votes		74,849	100.00	
Total rejected ballots		762		
Unreturned ballots		273		
Turnout		75,884	83.59	▼3.39
Registered electors		90,780		
Majority		37,751	50.44	▲21.96
PKR hold		Swing		
Source(s) "His Majesty's Government Gazette - Notice of Contested Election, Parliament for the State of Penang [P.U. (B) 236/2018]" (PDF). Attorney General's Chambers of Malaysia. 3 May 2018. "Federal Government Gazette - Results of Contested Election and Statements of the Poll after the Official Addition of Votes, Parliamentary Constituencies for the State of Penang [P.U. (B) 310/2018]" (PDF). Attorney General's Chambers of Malaysia. 28 May 2018.

Malaysian general election, 2013
Party	Candidate	Votes	%	∆%
PKR	Sim Tze Tzin	43,558	64.24	▲1.77
BN	Tang Heap Seng	24,251	35.76	▼1.77
Total valid votes		67,809	100.00	
Total rejected ballots		850		
Unreturned ballots		187		
Turnout		68,846	86.98	▲10.53
Registered electors		79,155		
Majority		19,307	28.48	▲3.54
PKR hold		Swing		
Source(s) "Federal Government Gazette - Notice of Contested Election, Parliament for the State of Penang [P.U. (B) 173/2013]" (PDF). Attorney General's Chambers of Malaysia. 26 April 2013. "Federal Government Gazette - Results of Contested Election and Statements of the Poll after the Official Addition of Votes, Parliamentary Constituencies for the State of Penang [P.U. (B) 214/2013]" (PDF). Attorney General's Chambers of Malaysia. 22 May 2013. Archived from the original (PDF) on 22 March 2019.

Malaysian general election, 2008
Party	Candidate	Votes	%	∆%
PKR	Zahrain Mohamed Hashim	27,618	62.47	▲36.03
BN	Ooi Siew Kim	16,589	37.53	▼36.03
Total valid votes		44,207	100.00	
Total rejected ballots		655		
Unreturned ballots		1,556		
Turnout		46,418	76.45	▲2.42
Registered electors		60,713		
Majority		11,029	24.94	▼22.18
PKR gain from BN		Swing		?

Malaysian general election, 2004
Party	Candidate	Votes	%	∆%
BN	Wong Kam Hoong	29,430	73.56	▲15.92
PKR	Ong Ping Cheow	10,579	26.44	▲26.44
Total valid votes		40,009	100.00	
Total rejected ballots		1,010		
Unreturned ballots		1		
Turnout		41,020	74.03	▼0.81
Registered electors		55,409		
Majority		18,851	47.12	▲31.84
BN hold		Swing		

Malaysian general election, 1999
Party	Candidate	Votes	%	∆%
BN	Wong Kam Hoong	35,762	57.64	▲2.32
DAP	Zulkifli Mohd Noor	26,281	42.36	▼2.32
Total valid votes		62,043	100.00	
Total rejected ballots		1,144		
Unreturned ballots		201		
Turnout		63,388	74.84	▼0.71
Registered electors		80,400		
Majority		9,481	15.28	▲3.53
BN hold		Swing		

Malaysian general election, 1995
Party	Candidate	Votes	%	∆%
BN	Wong Kam Hoong	32,190	55.32	▲7.69
DAP	Ahmad Nor	25,351	43.57	▼8.80
PBS	Lakhbir Singh Sadu Singh	648	1.11	▲1.11
Total valid votes		58,189	100.00	
Total rejected ballots		908		
Unreturned ballots		176		
Turnout		59,273	75.55	▲1.30
Registered electors		78,455		
Majority		6,839	11.75	▲7.01
BN gain from DAP		Swing		?

Malaysian general election, 1990
Party	Candidate	Votes	%	∆%
DAP	Ahmad Nor	25,853	52.37	▲3.39
BN	Khoo Gark Kim	23,513	47.63	▼0.70
Total valid votes		49,366	100.00	
Total rejected ballots		814		
Unreturned ballots		0		
Turnout		50,180	74.25	▲4.02
Registered electors		67,582		
Majority		2,340	4.74	▲4.09
DAP hold		Swing		

Malaysian general election, 1986
Party	Candidate	Votes	%
DAP	Peter Paul Dason	19,610	48.98
BN	Lee Jong Ki	19,348	48.33
SDP	Lim Kah Bin	1,075	2.69
Total valid votes		40,033	100.00
Total rejected ballots		1,084	
Unreturned ballots		0	
Turnout		41,117	70.23
Registered electors		58,545	
Majority		262	0.65
This was a new constituency created.
