= Lee Kim Sai =

Malaysian politician (1937–2019)

Yang Berbahagia Tan Sri Lee Kim Sai PSM DPMS PPN
- 李金狮

Minister of Health
- In office 27 October 1990 – 7 May 1995
- Monarchs: Azlan Shah; Ja’afar
- Prime Minister: Mahathir Mohamad
- Deputy: Mohd Farid Ariffin
- Preceded by: Ng Cheng Kiat
- Succeeded by: Chua Jui Meng
- Constituency: Hulu Langat

Minister of Housing and Local Government
- In office 14 August 1989 – 26 October 1990
- Monarch: Azlan Shah
- Prime Minister: Mahathir Mohamad
- Deputy: Hussein Ahmad; Osu Sukam
- Preceded by: Ng Cheng Kiat
- Succeeded by: Ting Chew Peh
- Constituency: Hulu Langat

Minister of Labour
- In office 21 May 1985 – 14 August 1989
- Monarchs: Iskandar; Azlan Shah
- Prime Minister: Mahathir Mohamad
- Deputy: Zakaria Abdul Rahman (1985–1986); William Lye Chee Hien (1985–1986); Wan Abu Bakar Wan Mohamad (1986–1987); Kalakau Untol (1986–1989); K. Pathmanaban (1987–1989)
- Preceded by: Mak Hon Kam (as Minister of Labour and Manpower)
- Succeeded by: Lim Ah Lek (as Minister of Human Resources)
- Constituency: Ulu Selangor; Hulu Langat

Deputy President of the Malaysian Chinese Association
- In office September 1986 – July 1996
- President: Ling Liong Sik
- Preceded by: Ling Liong Sik
- Succeeded by: Lim Ah Lek

Member of the Malaysian Parliament for Hulu Langat
- In office 3 August 1986 – 23 April 1995
- Preceded by: Rosemary Chow Poh Keong (MCA-BN)
- Succeeded by: Badrul Hisham Abdul Aziz (UMNO-BN)
- Majority: 8,925 (1986); 9,691 (1990)

Member of the Malaysian Parliament for Ulu Selangor
- In office 26 April 1982 – 2 August 1986
- Preceded by: Michael Chen (MCA-BN)
- Succeeded by: S. Subramaniam (MIC-BN)
- Majority: 7,377 (1982)

Member of the Selangor State Legislative Assembly for Rawang
- In office 14 September 1974 – 21 April 1982
- Preceded by: Constituency established
- Succeeded by: Tang See Hang (MCA-BN)
- Majority: 1,374 (1974); 3,196 (1978)

Personal details
- Born: 1 March 1937 Rawang, Selangor, Federated Malay States, British Malaya (now Malaysia)
- Died: 24 November 2019 (aged 82) Jalan Setia Bakti, Bukit Damansara, Kuala Lumpur, Malaysia
- Resting place: Xiao En Nilai Memorial Park, 286 Km, KL-Seremban Highway (South Bound), Nilai, Negeri Sembilan, Malaysia
- Citizenship: Malaysian
- Party: Malayan Chinese Association (MCA)
- Spouse: Puan Sri Datin Sri Wan Yuet Fong
- Children: Boon Kuan, Boon Tim, Boon Siew, Boon Cheng

Lee Kim Sai (simplified Chinese: 李金狮; traditional Chinese: 李金獅; pinyin: Lǐ Jīnshī) (1 March 1937 – 24 November 2019) was a Malaysian politician. In the 1980s and 1990s, he served as Labour Minister (1985–1989), Housing and Local Government Minister (1989–1990) and Health Minister (1990–1995); and was deputy president of Malaysian Chinese Association (MCA) (1986–1996), a major component party of the Barisan Nasional (BN) coalition.

== Early life ==
Lee was born on 1 March 1937 to a poor family in Ulu Klang, Selangor, and was brought up in Jinjang, Kuala Lumpur. He was educated at Chong Hwa High School in Kuala Lumpur, then trained as a teacher at the Teachers' Training College in Kuala Lumpur. He started teaching in 1957, and rose to become the principal of Kepong Chinese School.

== Political career ==
Lee joined the MCA in 1965, and stood for Selangor State Legislative Assembly constituency of Kepong in the 1969 general election, but lost to Tan Chee Khoon of the Parti Gerakan Rakyat Malaysia (Gerakan). In the 1974 general election he contested and won the Rawang state seat, which he retained in the 1978 election. He became head of the MCA Youth in 1979, and was elected vice-president of the MCA the same year. He was elected as the Member of Parliament (MP) in the 1982 general election for Ulu Selangor, and was appointed deputy minister in the Prime Minister's Department.

In 1984, in a row over allegations of fictitious membership that supported the Acting President Dr. Neo Yee Pan, he was expelled from the MCA along with Tan Koon Swan, Ling Liong Sik and others by the Acting President. In the ensuing party election to resolve the crisis, Tan Koon Swan was elected president with the largest majority in the party's history, and Lee was elected one of the party vice-presidents as well as the secretary general. Tan however resigned the next year over a scandal involving his business dealings in Singapore, and Ling Liong Sik took over as president while Lee moved up to become the Deputy President. Lee was appointed Minister of Labour in 1985, and in 1989, he became Minister of Housing and Local Government. He then became the Minister of Health from 1990 until 1995. Lee also successfully won the Hulu Langat federal constituency for two terms consecutively in both the 1986 general election and 1990 general election.

In 1993, he attempted to challenge Ling for the leadership of the MCA, but backed down after failing to gain enough support. He retired from politics in 1996.

== Controversy ==
Lee was outspoken on a number of sensitive issues, such as questioning the Malaysian New Economic Policy and the political dominance of the Malays. In particular, in early November 1986, the Selangor MCA of which he was its head, passed a resolution in its annual convention calling on the government to review the Sedition Act and to make it an offence to refer or call any of the country's three major races as immigrants or pendatang. The resolution, which stated that Malaysia's three major races originated from other countries and that none of them should brand the others as immigrants and claim themselves to be natives. This was interpreted as challenging the bumiputra status of the Malays, which led to calls for his sacking by members of United Malays National Organisation (UMNO), and the withdrawal of his datukship by the Sultan of Selangor (later restored). He also joined a protest rally with the opposition; Democratic Action Party (DAP) objecting to the appointments of senior assistants and supervisors without qualifications in Mandarin in Chinese primary schools.

== Death ==
After suffering from a stroke since October 2018, Lee died on 24 November 2019 at 12.30 a.m. at family home in Jalan Setia Bakti, Bukit Damansara, Kuala Lumpur. His remains were buried at Xiao En Memorial Park, Nilai, Negeri Sembilan.

== Election results ==
Selangor State Legislative Assembly
Year	Constituency	Candidate	Votes	Pct	Opponent(s)	Votes	Pct	Ballots cast	Majority	Turnout
1969	N03 Kepong	Lee Kim Sai (MCA)	6,291	32.10%	Tan Chee Khoon (Gerakan)	13,310	67.90%	20,804	7,019	68.43%
1974	N13 Rawang	Lee Kim Sai (MCA)	3,701	48.72%	Tan Heng Swee (DAP)	2,327	30.63%	21,803	6,281	71.88%
1974	N13 Rawang	Lee Kim Sai (MCA)	3,701	48.72%	J.P. Samuel Raj (PEKEMAS)	847	1.115%	21,803	6,281	71.88%
1974	N13 Rawang	Lee Kim Sai (MCA)	3,701	48.72%	Chou Yew Koh (IND)	722	9.50%	21,803	6,281	71.88%
1978	N13 Rawang	Lee Kim Sai (MCA)	6,763	60.80%	Khoo Chin Tow (DAP)	3,567	32.07%	N/A	3,196	N/A
1978	N13 Rawang	Lee Kim Sai (MCA)	6,763	60.80%	Hussein Ibrahim (PAS)	667	6.00%	N/A	3,196	N/A
1978	N13 Rawang	Lee Kim Sai (MCA)	6,763	60.80%	Zainuddin Karim (PEKEMAS)	127	1.14%	N/A	3,196	N/A

Parliament of Malaysia
Year	Constituency	Candidate	Votes	Pct	Opponent(s)	Votes	Pct	Ballots cast	Majority	Turnout
1982	P075 Ulu Selangor	Lee Kim Sai (MCA)	14,138	48.70%	Mohamed Arif Kamaruddin (IND)	6,761	23.29%	30,088	7,377	74.68%
1982	P075 Ulu Selangor	Lee Kim Sai (MCA)	14,138	48.70%	Wong Kim Wah (IND)	5,232	18.02%	30,088	7,377	74.68%
1982	P075 Ulu Selangor	Lee Kim Sai (MCA)	14,138	48.70%	Pan Su Peng (DAP)	2,897	9.98%	30,088	7,377	74.68%
1986	P089 Hulu Langat	Lee Kim Sai (MCA)	22,217	57.38%	Lam Man Yoon (DAP)	13,292	34.33%	39,651	8,925	71.37%
1986	P089 Hulu Langat	Lee Kim Sai (MCA)	22,217	57.38%	Ahamad Kamari (SDP)	3,208	8.29%	39,651	8,925	71.37%
1990	P089 Hulu Langat	Lee Kim Sai (MCA)	28,714	60.84%	Lim Ann Koon (DAP)	18,483	39.16%	48,954	9,691	76.18%

== Honours ==
- Malaysia
  - Commander of the Order of Loyalty to the Crown of Malaysia (PSM) – Tan Sri (2000)
  - Medal of the Order of the Defender of the Realm (PPN) (1974)
- Selangor
  - Knight Commander of the Order of the Crown of Selangor (DPMS) – Dato' (1979, revoked on 23 October 1987 and reinstated on 8 March 1990)
  - Companion of the Order of the Crown of Selangor (SMS) (revoked on 23 October 1987)
