= Peter Tham =

Singaporean fraudster and stockbroker

- Born: Peter Tham Wing Fai; 1948 (age 76–77); Singapore
- Occupation: Stockbrocker
- Known for: Fugitive from justice
- Spouses: Joyce Aw (m. 1973, divorced) Kok Mei Yee (m. 1995)

Peter Tham Wing Fai (born 1948) is a Singaporean fugitive, stockbroker and former director of Pan-Electric Industries. A failure by him to observe a forward contract agreement that he negotiated with Tan Koon Swan was responsible for the company's collapse in 1985.

== Background ==
Tham left Singapore in 1984, before Pan-El collapsed. In April 1986, he was traced to Seattle in the United States by FBI officials. He flew to Tokyo, from where he was extradited back to Singapore, immediately arrested, and charged with 26 counts of helping Tan Kok Liang to make "fictitious sharetrading transactions." He was eventually sentenced to a total of 10 years in jail—eight in 1986 for forging Pan-Electric share certificates and two in 1988 for criminal breach of trust. In February 1991, he was declared a bankrupt for owing S$25 million to various parties.

Tham was released from jail early, in 1992. He divorced his wife, Joyce Aw, whom he had married in 1973, and married Kok Mei Yee in 1995. In 1998, he was in trouble with the law again after Kok alleged that he had beaten her. She also informed the Official Assignee that although he was still officially bankrupt, he had been keeping a collection of antique longcase clocks and Chinese pottery with a total value of S$400,000 in their Peck Hay Road apartment, without declaring them to the Official Assignee as was required by law. Although his wife later withdrew the private summons charge of assault, he was still being investigated for hiding personal assets and in May 2000, he was charged with hiding about S$1.7 million in cash, three cars and other items from the authorities. The trial was adjourned but when the case was next mentioned in September 2000, Tham's lawyer could not contact him and a warrant of arrest was issued for Tham.

Tham was later traced to the Indonesian island of Batam but has since disappeared again.

In 2004, his story was re-enacted on an episode of MediaCorp's Missing television series.

== See also ==
- List of fugitives from justice who disappeared
