= Wong Kam Hoong =

Malaysian politician

Yang Berbahagia Dato' Wong Kam Hoong DMPN
- 黄锦鸿

Chairman of National Film Development Corporation Malaysia
- In office 2009–2010
- Minister: Rais Yatim
- Preceded by: Razali Ibrahim
- Succeeded by: Mohammed Mohd Daud

Deputy Minister of Arts, Culture and Heritage
- In office 27 March 2004 – 18 March 2008
- Monarchs: Tuanku Syed Sirajuddin (2001–2006); Sultan Mizan Zainal Abidin (2006–2011)
- Prime Minister: Abdullah Ahmad Badawi
- Minister: Rais Yatim; Mohd Shafie Apdal
- Preceded by: Fu Ah Kiow (Deputy Minister of Culture, Arts and Tourism)
- Succeeded by: Teng Boon Soon (Deputy Minister of National Unity, Arts, Culture and Heritage)

Parliamentary Secretary of Domestic Trade and Consumer Affairs
- In office 1999–2004
- Minister: Muhyiddin Yassin
- Preceded by: Tan Chai Ho
- Succeeded by: Hoo Seong Chang

Member of the Malaysian Parliament for Bayan Baru
- In office 25 April 1995 – 8 March 2008
- Preceded by: Ahmad Nor (DAP)
- Succeeded by: Zahrain Mohamed Hashim (PR–PKR)
- Majority: 6,839 (1995); 9,481 (1999); 18,851 (2004)

Personal details
- Born: 13 May 1947 (age 78) Penang, Malayan Union
- Party: Malaysian Chinese Association (MCA)
- Other political affiliations: Barisan Nasional (BN)
- Occupation: Politician
- Profession: Accountant

Wong Kam Hoong is a Malaysian politician from the Malaysian Chinese Association (MCA), a component party of the Barisan Nasional (BN) coalition. He was a former Member of Parliament (MP) for Bayan Baru constituency in Penang for three terms from 1995 to 2008.

== Politics ==
Wong Kam Hoong elected as Member of Parliament for Bayan Baru in 1995 general election in Penang. After the 1999 general election, he was appointed as Parliamentary Secretary of Domestic Trade and Consumer Affairs until 2004. Wong Kam Hoong was appointed as Deputy Minister of Arts, Culture and Heritage in 2004 to 2008. During the 2008 general election, his name was dropped together with other MCA leaders likes Dato' Chua Jui Meng (Bakri), Dato' Loke Yuen Yow (Tanjung Malim), Dato' Yap Pian Hon (Serdang), Dato' Seri Ting Chew Peh (Gopeng) and Tan Yee Kew (Klang).

== Election results ==
Penang State Legislative Assembly
Year	Constituency	Candidate	Votes	Pct	Opponent(s)	Votes	Pct	Ballots cast	Majority	Turnout
1986	N20 Ayer Itam	Wong Kam Hoong (MCA)	5,990	40.10%	Gooi Hock Seng (DAP)	8,949	59.90%	15,270	2,959	72.70%

Parliament of Malaysia
Year	Constituency	Candidate	Votes	Pct	Opponent(s)	Votes	Pct	Ballots cast	Majority	Turnout
1995	P050 Bayan Baru	Wong Kam Hoong (MCA)	32,190	55.32%	Ahmad Nor (DAP)	25,351	43.57%	59,273	6,839	75.55%
1995	P050 Bayan Baru	Wong Kam Hoong (MCA)	32,190	55.32%	Lakhbir Singh Sadu Singh (PBS)	648	1.11%	59,273	6,839	75.55%
1999	P050 Bayan Baru	Wong Kam Hoong (MCA)	35,762	57.64%	Zulkifli Mohd Noor (DAP)	26,281	42.36%	63,388	9,481	74.84%
2004	P052 Bayan Baru	Wong Kam Hoong (MCA)	29,430	73.56%	Ong Ping Cheow (PKR)	10,579	26.44%	41,020	18,851	74.03%

== Honours ==
- Penang
  - Companion of the Order of the Defender of State (DMPN) – Dato' (2004)
