= Ahmad Nor =

Malaysian politician

- احمد نور

Member of the Malaysian Parliament for Bayan Baru
- In office 21 October 1990 – 25 April 1995
- Preceded by: Peter Paul Dason (DAP)
- Succeeded by: Wong Kam Hoong (BN–MCA)
- Majority: 2,340 (1990)

President of the Socialist Democratic Party
- In office 1 March 1986 – 28 October 1986
- Preceded by: Ismail Hashim

Faction represented in Dewan Rakyat
- 1990–1995: Democratic Action Party
- 1990–1995: Gagasan Rakyat

Personal details
- Born: Ahmad Nor; 1943 Alor Setar, Kedah, Japanese occupation of Malaya
- Died: 11 February 2003 (aged 59–60)
- Party: Malaysian Nationalist Party (NASMA) (1986); Socialist Democratic Party (SDP) (1986); Democratic Action Party (DAP) (1986–2003)
- Other political affiliations: Gagasan Rakyat (GR) (1990–1995); Barisan Alternatif (BA) (1999–2001)
- Spouse: Mariam Bibie Ibrahim
- Children: 5
- Occupation: Politician

Ahmad bin Nor was a Malaysian politician and trade unionist. He was former Member of parliament (MP) for Bayan Baru from October 1990 to April 1995. He was a member of DAP and president for CUEPACS (1983-1986). He was noted as being the first elected Malay MP from Chinese dominated DAP.

== Political career ==
Ahmad Nor first foray into politics was when he founded Malaysian Nationalist Party and become its deputy president. He later quit the party due to a power struggle.

On 1 March 1986, Ahmad Nor took over as chairman of the Socialist Democratic Party. He contested the 1986 Malaysian general election in the Lembah Pantai parliamentary seat and Kelana Jaya state seat but lost both seats.

Ahmad Nor later joined the DAP after the 1986 Malaysian general election. He contested the 1987 Gopeng by-election but lost.

In 1990 Malaysian general election, he finally won the Bayan Baru parliamentary contest and became the first elected Malay representative for DAP. He did not managed to defend the seat in 1995 Malaysian general election.

In 1990, Ahmad Nor lost against Chen Man Hin for the position National DAP chairmen.

In 1999 Malaysian general election, he lost against BN candidate Lim Choon Kim for state seat N25 Damansara Utama, Selangor

== Death ==
Ahmad Nor died aged 60, dying at the Kuala Lumpur Hospital on 11 February 2003 due to lung cancer. He was admitted to the hospital after falling into a coma and was hospitalised for three weeks. He was buried at his hometown in Alor Star.

== Legacy ==
A road have been named after him in 2014.

== Election results ==
Parliament of Malaysia
Year	Constituency	Candidate	Votes	Pct	Opponent(s)	Votes	Pct	Ballots cast	Majority	Turnout
1986	P100 Lembah Pantai	Ahmad Nor (SDP)	6,112	16.60%	Abdul Razak Abu Samah (UMNO)	21,408	58.17%	36,803	12,540	58.48%
1986	P100 Lembah Pantai	Ahmad Nor (SDP)	6,112	16.60%	Yap Kiew Sing (DAP)	8,868	24.10%	36,803	12,540	58.48%
1987	P064 Gopeng	Ahmad Nor (DAP)	8,096	38.89%	Ting Chew Peh (MCA)	12,619	60.62%	21,236	4,523	62.20%
1987	P064 Gopeng	Ahmad Nor (DAP)	8,096	38.89%	Tan Kee Chye (IND)	103	0.49%	21,236	4,523	62.20%
1990	P047 Bayan Baru	Ahmad Nor (DAP)	25,853	52.37%	Khoo Gark Kim (MCA)	23,513	47.63%	50,180	2,340	74.25%
1995	P050 Bayan Baru	Ahmad Nor (DAP)	25,351	43.57%	Wong Kam Hoong (MCA)	32,190	55.32%	59,273	6,839	75.55%
1995	P050 Bayan Baru	Ahmad Nor (DAP)	25,351	43.57%	Lakhbir Singh Sadu Singh (PBS)	648	1.11%	59,273	6,839	75.55%

Selangor State Legislative Assembly
Year	Constituency	Candidate	Votes	Pct	Opponent(s)	Votes	Pct	Ballots cast	Majority	Turnout
1986	N27 Kelana Jaya	Ahmad Nor (SDP)	800	4.06%	Megat Najmuddin Megat Khas (UMNO)	10,402	52.76%	19,714	3,261	63.69%
1986	N27 Kelana Jaya	Ahmad Nor (SDP)	800	4.06%	Yap Kok Heng (DAP)	7,141	36.22%	19,714	3,261	63.69%
1986	N27 Kelana Jaya	Ahmad Nor (SDP)	800	4.06%	Yusof Ghani (PAS)	919	4.66%	19,714	3,261	63.69%
1986	N27 Kelana Jaya	Ahmad Nor (SDP)	800	4.06%	Radakrishnan Pillai (NASMA)	170	0.86%	19,714	3,261	63.69%
1999	N25 Damansara Utama	Ahmad Nor (DAP)	12,531	43.35%	Lim Choon Kin (MCA)	16,378	56.65%	28,909	3,847	72.95%
