= Gopeng (disambiguation) =

Gopeng may refer to:

- Gopeng, town in Perak, Malaysia
  - Gopeng (federal constituency), represented in the Dewan Rakyat (lit. 'Parliamentary Council'), the lower house of the Parliament of Malaysia
  - Gopeng (state constituency), formerly represented in the Perak State Legislative Assembly (1959–86)
