= Harakah Keadilan Rakyat =

People's Justice Movement Harakah Keadilan Rakyat
- Founded: 14 July 1986
- Dissolved: 1990
- Preceded by: Malayan Peoples' Socialist Front (SF)
- Succeeded by: Gagasan Rakyat; Angkatan Perpaduan Ummah
- Membership: Pan-Malaysian Islamic Party (PAS); Parti Sosialis Rakyat Malaysia (PSRM); Malaysian Nationalist Party (NASMA); Social Democratic Party (SDP); Malaysian Workers' Party (PPPM); Pan-Malaysian Islamic Front (BERJASA)
- Ideology: Reformism
- Political position: Big tent

Harakah Keadilan Rakyat (HAK) or the People's Justice Front was an informal political coalition that was formed on 14th July 1986 to provide a unified alternative to the then incumbent governing Barisan Nasional coalition, with the objective of reducing or denying it's two-thirds majority that it held since Independence. The HAK contested in the 1986 Malaysian general election. While the Democratic Action Party was initially receptive, it pulled out at the last minute before the coalition was announced.

In 1990, it was superseded by Gagasan Rakyat and Angkatan Perpaduan Ummah.

== General election results ==
Election	Total seats won	Seats contested	Total votes	Voting Percentage	Outcome of election	Election leader
1978	1 / 177	1	831,676	17.98%	1 seat; Opposition	N/A

=== State elections ===
State election	State Legislative Assembly											
State election	Perlis	Kedah	Kelantan	Terengganu	Penang	Perak	Pahang	Selangor	Negeri Sembilan	Malacca	Johor	Total won / Total contested
2/3 majority	2 / 3	2 / 3	2 / 3	2 / 3	2 / 3	2 / 3	2 / 3	2 / 3	2 / 3	2 / 3	2 / 3	
1986	0 / 14	3 / 28	10 / 39	2 / 32	0 / 33	0 / 46	0 / 33	0 / 42	0 / 28	0 / 20	0 / 36	15 / 315
