= Kongres Rakyat Malaysia =

Malaysian People Congress Kongres Rakyat Malaysia KRM
- Leader: Zainab Yang (Founder)
- Founded: February 1986
- Dissolved: 1986
- Split from: Malaysian Nationalist Party
- Succeeded by: GERAKAN
- Ideology: Social democracy

Malaysian People Congress (KRM) or Malay: Kongress Rakyat Malaysia was a splinter party of Malaysian Nationalist Party (NASMA) formed in 1986 by Zainab Yang. The party were formed due to leadership dispute for NASMA. The party intend to contest 1986 Malaysian general election but never succeed.

== Platform ==
The party causes is multiracial, intend to eradicating corruption, championing cause of the lower class group and representing unrepresented community such as Chinese Muslim.

== See also ==
- Malaysian Nationalist Party
- Politics of Malaysia
- List of political parties in Malaysia
