= Lee Boon Chye =

Malaysian politician (born 1959)

Yang Berbahagia Dato' Lee Boon Chye DPMP
- 李文材
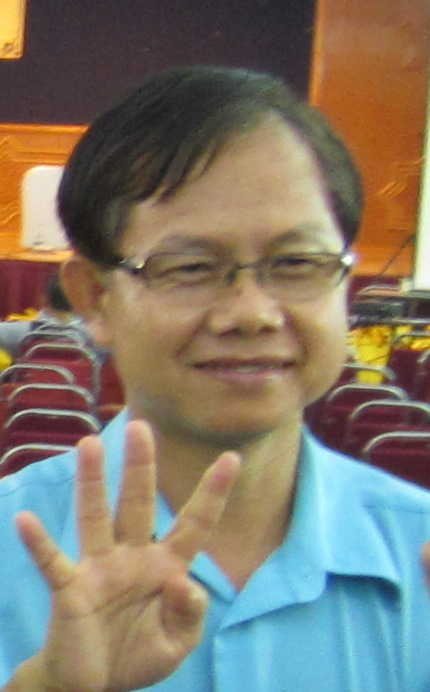

Deputy Minister of Health
- In office 2 July 2018 – 24 February 2020
- Monarchs: Muhammad V (2018–2019); Abdullah (2019–2020)
- Prime Minister: Mahathir Mohamad
- Minister: Dzulkefly Ahmad
- Preceded by: Hilmi Yahaya
- Succeeded by: Noor Azmi Ghazali (Deputy Minister of Health I); Aaron Ago Dagang (Deputy Minister of Health II)
- Constituency: Gopeng

Member of the Malaysian Parliament for Gopeng
- In office 8 March 2008 – 19 November 2022
- Preceded by: Ting Chew Peh (BN–MCA)
- Succeeded by: Tan Kar Hing (PH–PKR)
- Majority: 7,768 (2008); 15,309 (2013); 29,778 (2018)

Faction represented in Dewan Rakyat
- 2008–2018: People's Justice Party
- 2018–2022: Pakatan Harapan

Personal details
- Born: Lee Boon Chye; 26 September 1959 (age 67) Segamat, Johor, Federation of Malaya (now Malaysia)
- Citizenship: Malaysian
- Party: People's Justice Party (PKR)
- Other political affiliations: Barisan Alternatif (BA) (1999–2004); Pakatan Rakyat (PR) (2008–2015); Pakatan Harapan (PH) (since 2015)
- Spouse: Lo Lee Hong
- Education: University of Malaya
- Occupation: Politician
- Profession: Cardiologist
- Lee Boon Chye on Facebook

Lee Boon Chye (Chinese: 李文材; pinyin: Lǐ Wéncái; born 26 September 1959) is a Malaysian politician who served as the Deputy Minister of Health in the Pakatan Harapan (PH) administration under former Prime Minister Mahathir Mohamad and former Minister Dzulkefly Ahmad from July 2018 to the collapse of the PH administration in February 2020 and the Member of Parliament (MP) for Gopeng from March 2008 to November 2022. He is a member of the People's Justice Party (PKR), a component party of the PH coalition.

== Background ==
Lee is a doctor and a certified Cardiologist. He graduated from medical school in 1985 from the University of Malaya. He also holds 2 post graduate degrees, a Master's of Medicine from the National University of Malaysia (UKM) and Membership of the Royal Colleges of Physicians of the United Kingdom.

== Politics career ==
After losing in his debut in the 2004 general election (GE11), Lee was elected to Parliament in the 2008 general election (GE12), defeating Ling Hee Leong, son of former Malaysian Chinese Association (MCA) president, Ling Liong Sik to wrest the Gopeng seat away from the then governing Barisan Nasional (BN) coalition. He successfully retained the seat the subsequent 2013 (GE13) and 2018 (GE14) general elections.

After the GE14 which saw PH forming the new federal government, Lee had initially turned down the new seventh Prime Minister Mahathir Mohamad's offer to appoint him Deputy Health Minister. He however relented and accepted the post at last after much persuasions and considerations.

== Election results ==
Parliament of Malaysia
Year	Constituency	Candidate	Votes	Pct	Opponent(s)	Votes	Pct	Ballots cast	Majority	Turnout
2004	P071 Gopeng	Lee Boon Chye (PKR)	15,530	33.88%	Ting Chew Peh (MCA)	30,312	66.12%	47,566	14,782	69.47%
2008	P071 Gopeng	Lee Boon Chye (PKR)	29,696	57.08%	Ling Hee Leong (MCA)	22,328	42.92%	53,303	7,368	71.70%
2013	P071 Gopeng	Lee Boon Chye (PKR)	47,558	59.59%	Tan Chin Meng (MCA)	32,249	40.41%	81,442	15,309	83.88%
2018	P071 Gopeng	Lee Boon Chye (PKR)	48,923	61.75%	Heng Seai Kie (MCA)	19,145	24.16%	80,532	29,778	81.21%
2018	P071 Gopeng	Lee Boon Chye (PKR)	48,923	61.75%	Ismail Ariffin (PAS)	11,165	14.09%	80,532	29,778	81.21%

== Honours ==
- Perak
  - Knight Commander of the Order of the Perak State Crown (DPMP) – Dato' (2023)

== See also ==
- Gopeng (federal constituency)
