= Mata Kuching =

Penang constituency

Defunct federal constituency
- Legislature: Dewan Rakyat
- Constituency created: 1974
- Constituency abolished: 1986
- First contested: 1974
- Last contested: 1982

Mata Kuching was a federal constituency in Penang, Malaysia, that was represented in the Dewan Rakyat from 1974 to 1986.

The federal constituency was created in the 1974 redistribution and was mandated to return a single member to the Dewan Rakyat under the first past the post voting system.

== History ==
It was abolished in 1986 when it was redistributed.

=== Representation history ===
Members of Parliament for Mata Kuching
Parliament	No	Years	Member	Party	Vote Share
Constituency created from Bagan and Seberang Utara
4th	P036	1974–1978	Ling Liong Sik (林良实)	BN (MCA)	13,755; 53.97%
5th	P036	1978–1982	Ling Liong Sik (林良实)	BN (MCA)	23,564; 65.27%
6th	P036	1982–1986	Ling Liong Sik (林良实)	BN (MCA)	26,995; 62.11%
Constituency abolished split into Bagan and Tasek Gelugor

=== State constituency ===
Parliamentary constituency	State constituency						
Parliamentary constituency	1955–1959*	1959–1974	1974–1986	1986–1995	1995–2004	2004–2018	2018–present
Mata Kuching			Bagan Ajam				
Mata Kuching			Bagan Dalam				
Mata Kuching			Bagan Jermal				

=== Historical boundaries ===
State Constituency	Area
State Constituency	1974
Bagan Ajam	Bagan Ajam; Bagan Lalang; Permatang Tok Jaya; Sungai Puyu; Teluk Ayer Tawar
Bagan Dalam	Bagan Dalam; Bagan Luar; Limbungan; Perai; Sungai Nyior
Bagan Jermal	Bagan Jermal; Butterworth; Mak Mandin; Raja Uda; Taman Anggerik

== Election results ==
Malaysian general election, 1982: Mata Kuching
Party	Candidate	Votes	%	∆%
BN	Lim Liong Seek @ Ling Liong Sik	26,995	62.11	▼3.16
DAP	Goh Sin Khoon	14,839	34.14	▲34.14
Independent	Raja Ahamed Narudin @ Raja Mohamed Raja Sulaiman	1,626	3.74	▲3.74
Total valid votes		43,460	100.00	
Total rejected ballots		1,186		
Unreturned ballots		0		
Turnout		44,646	77.46	▼1.83
Registered electors		57,635		
Majority		12,156	27.97	▼14.13
BN hold		Swing		

Malaysian general election, 1978: Mata Kuching
Party	Candidate	Votes	%	∆%
BN	Lim Liong Seek @ Ling Liong Sik	23,564	65.27	▲11.30
SDP	Loh Kim Heng	8,365	23.17	▲23.17
PAS	Abdul Hamid Abdullah	4,174	11.56	▲11.56
Total valid votes		36,103	100.00	
Total rejected ballots		1,501		
Unreturned ballots		0		
Turnout		37,604	79.29	▼4.68
Registered electors		47,425		
Majority		15,199	42.10	▲21.31
BN hold		Swing		

Malaysian general election, 1974: Mata Kuching
Party	Candidate	Votes	%
BN	Lim Liong Seek @ Ling Liong Sik	13,755	53.97
PEKEMAS	Ong Yi How	8,457	33.18
DAP	Goh Lim Eam	3,273	12.84
Total valid votes		25,485	100.00
Total rejected ballots		869	
Unreturned ballots		0	
Turnout		26,354	83.97
Registered electors		31,385	
Majority		5,298	20.79
This was a new constituency created.
