= List of ambassadors of Malaysia to Indonesia =

Ambassador of Malaysia to Indonesia
- Incumbent; Syed Mohamad Hasrin Syed Husin since 9 February 2023
- Style: His Excellency
- Seat: Jakarta, Indonesia
- Appointer: Yang di-Pertuan Agong
- Inaugural holder: Senu Abdul Rahman
- Formation: 1957
- Website: www.kln.gov.my/web/idn_jakarta/home

The ambassador of Malaysia to the Republic of Indonesia is the head of Malaysia's diplomatic mission to Indonesia. The position has the rank and status of an ambassador extraordinary and plenipotentiary and is based in the Embassy of Malaysia, Jakarta.

== List of heads of mission ==
=== Ambassadors to Indonesia ===
Ambassador	Term start	Term end
Senu Abdul Rahman	1957	1963
Kamaruddin Idris	1963	1967
Yaacob Abdul Latiff	1967	1972
Zainal Abidin Sulong	1972	1977
Hashim Sultan	1977	1978
Mahmood Mohd Yunus	1979	1982
Mohamed Rahmat	1982	1985
Mohamed Khatib Abdul Hamid	1985	1989
Abdullah Zawawi Mohamed	1989	1993
Dali Mahmud Hashim	1993	1997
Zainal Abidin Alias	1997	1999
Rastam Mohd. Isa	1999	2003
Hamidon Ali	2003	2005
Zainal Abidin Mahamad Zain	2005	2009
Syed Munshe Afdzaruddin Syed Hassan	2009	2013
Zahrain Mohamed Hashim	5 September 2013	30 June 2018
Zainal Abidin Bakar	21 March 2019	4 April 2021
Syed Mohamad Hasrin Syed Husin	9 February 2023	incumbent

== See also ==
- Indonesia–Malaysia relations
