= Gopeng (federal constituency) =

Federal constituency in Perak, Malaysia

Gopeng (P071)
Perak constituency

Federal constituency
- Legislature: Dewan Rakyat
- MP: Tan Kar Hing; PH
- Constituency created: 1984
- First contested: 1986
- Last contested: 2022

Demographics
- Population (2020): 216,236
- Electors (2022): 143,657
- Area (km²): 577
- Pop. density (per km²): 374.8

Gopeng is a federal constituency in Kinta District and Kampar District, Perak, Malaysia, that has been represented in the Dewan Rakyat since 1986.

The federal constituency was created in the 1984 redistribution and is mandated to return a single member to the Dewan Rakyat under the first past the post voting system.

== Demographics ==
Ethnic breakdown of Gopeng's electorate as of 2022
1. Chinese (44.7%)
2. Malay (42.8%)
3. Indian (9.60%)
4. Other ethnicities (2.90%)

As of 2020, Gopeng has a population of 216,236 people.

Age breakdown of Gopeng's electorate as of 2022
1. 18–20 (6.26%)
2. 21–29 (22.1%)
3. 30–39 (21.0%)
4. 40–49 (16.9%)
5. 50–59 (14.7%)
6. 60–69 (11.2%)
7. 70–79 (5.56%)
8. 80–89 (1.91%)
9. above 90 (0.33%)
Gender breakdown of Gopeng's electorate as of 2022
1. Male (49.3%)
2. Female (50.7%)

== History ==
=== Polling districts ===
According to the federal gazette issued on 31 October 2022, the Gopeng constituency is divided into 33 polling districts.

State constituency	Polling Districts	Code	Location
Sungai Rapat (N44)	Ara Payong	071/44/01	SK St. Bernadette's Convent; SRA Rakyat Nurul Iman; Arena Square Batu Gajah
Sungai Rapat (N44)	Kampong Pisang	071/44/02	SK Sultan Yussuf
Sungai Rapat (N44)	Sri Jaya	071/44/03	SK Seri Jaya
Sungai Rapat (N44)	Sri Rahmat	071/44/04	SK Kg. Seri Rahmat
Sungai Rapat (N44)	Desa Pelancongan	071/44/05	SM Poi Lam (SUWA) Ipoh
Sungai Rapat (N44)	Desa Pakatan	071/44/06	SK Pengkalan; SMK Pengkalan
Sungai Rapat (N44)	Rapat Jaya	071/44/07	SK Rapat Jaya
Sungai Rapat (N44)	Sungai Rapat	071/44/08	SK Sungai Rapat; STAM Maahad Imtiyaz
Sungai Rapat (N44)	Sungai Rokam	071/44/09	SRA Rakyat Sungai Rokam
Simpang Pulai (N45)	Pekan Razaki	071/45/01	SK Seri Ampang
Simpang Pulai (N45)	Ampang Baharu	071/45/02	SJK (C) Min Sin
Simpang Pulai (N45)	Taman Ampang	071/45/03	SMK Wira Jaya
Simpang Pulai (N45)	Kampong Seri Ampang	071/45/04	SK Wira Jaya
Simpang Pulai (N45)	Taman Ipoh Jaya	071/45/05	SMK Seri Ampang; SRA Rakyat Al-Solatiah
Simpang Pulai (N45)	Rapat Setia Baru	071/45/06	SMK Gunung Rapat; SRA Rakyat Al-Hidayah; SM Al-Hidayah
Simpang Pulai (N45)	Rapat Setia	071/45/07	SK Rapat Setia
Simpang Pulai (N45)	Gunong Rapat Utara	071/45/08	SJK (C) Gunung Rapat
Simpang Pulai (N45)	Gunong Rapat Selatan	071/45/09	SJK (C) Gunung Rapat
Simpang Pulai (N45)	Taman Taufik	071/45/10	Sekolah Tinggi Shen Jai; SRA Rakyat Al-Falah
Simpang Pulai (N45)	Kampong Sengat	071/45/11	SJK (C) Bandar Seri Botani
Simpang Pulai (N45)	Taman Bersatu	071/45/12	SK Taman Bersatu; Dewan Komuniti Taman Bersatu
Simpang Pulai (N45)	Simpang Pulai	071/45/13	SJK (C) Phui Ying
Teja (N46)	Pos Raya	071/46/01	SK Pos Raya
Teja (N46)	Kampong Kepayang	071/46/02	SMK Simpang Pulai
Teja (N46)	Kampong Tekkah Baharu	071/46/03	SK Pengkalan Baharu
Teja (N46)	Kampong Bharu Kopisan	071/46/04	SJK (C) New Kopisan; SK Gopeng
Teja (N46)	Lawan Kuda Barat	071/46/05	SMK Seri Teja; SMK Idris Shah
Teja (N46)	Lawan Kuda Timor	071/46/06	SJK (C) Lawan Kuda Baru
Teja (N46)	Lawan Kuda Selatan	071/46/07	SJK (C) Lawan Kuda Baru
Teja (N46)	Kampong Pulai	071/46/08	Dewan Serbaguna Teja Kampong Pulai
Teja (N46)	Kampong Rawa	071/46/09	SK Gopeng
Teja (N46)	Gopeng	071/46/10	SJK (C) Man Ming
Teja (N46)	Kampong Sungai Itek	071/46/11	SK Sungai Itek; SK Ulu Geruntum

=== Representation history ===
Members of Parliament for Gopeng
Parliament	No	Years	Member	Party	Vote Share
Constituency created from Kinta, Batang Padang, Menglembu and Batu Gajah
7th	P064	1986–1987	Tan Koon Swan (陈群川)	BN (MCA)	14,009; 60.37%
7th	P064	1987–1990	Ting Chew Peh (陈祖排)	BN (MCA)	12,619; 60.62%
8th	P064	1990–1995	Ting Chew Peh (陈祖排)	BN (MCA)	14,991; 62.64%
9th	P067	1995–1999	Ting Chew Peh (陈祖排)	BN (MCA)	22,774; 74.04%
10th	P067	1999–2004	Ting Chew Peh (陈祖排)	BN (MCA)	21,254; 57.56%
11th	P071	2004–2008	Ting Chew Peh (陈祖排)	BN (MCA)	30,312; 66.12%
12th	P071	2008–2013	Lee Boon Chye (李文才)	PR (PKR)	29,696; 57.08%
13th	P071	2013–2015	Lee Boon Chye (李文才)	PR (PKR)	47,558; 59.59%
13th	P071	2015–2018	Lee Boon Chye (李文才)	PH (PKR)	47,558; 59.59%
14th	P071	2018–2022	Lee Boon Chye (李文才)	PH (PKR)	48,923; 61.75%
15th	P071	2022–present	Tan Kar Hing (陈家兴)	PH (PKR)	55,880; 53.92%

=== State constituency ===
Parliamentary constituency	State constituency						
Parliamentary constituency	1955–1959*	1959–1974	1974–1986	1986–1995	1995–2004	2004–2018	2018–present
Gopeng				Chenderong			
Gopeng					Rapat Setia		
Gopeng						Simpang Pulai	
Gopeng						Sungai Rapat	
Gopeng				Teja			

=== Historical boundaries ===
State Constituency	Area			
State Constituency	1984	1994	2003	2018
Chenderong	Changkat Tualang; Chenderong; Kampung Jeram; Kampung Seri Rahmat; Tasek permai			
Rapat Setia		Bandar Seri Botani; Kampung Meranti Lapan; Pegoh; Simpang Pulai; Sungai Rapat		
Simpang Pulai			Ampang; Bandar Seri Botani; Gunung Rapat; Pegoh; Rapat Setia	Ampang; Bandar Seri Botani; Gunung Rapat; Rapat Setia; Simpang Pulai
Sungai Rapat			Kampung Pengkalan Gate; Kampung Seri Rahmat; Sungai Rapat; Taman Cempaka; Tasek Permai	Kampung Seri Rahmat; Pegoh; Sungai Rapat; Taman Cempaka; Tasek Permai
Teja	Gopeng; Gunung Rapat; Kopisan Baru; Pos Raya; Simpang Pulai	Gopeng; Kampong Kepayang; Kampung Sungai Itek; Kopisan Baru; Pos Raya		

=== Current state assembly members ===
No.	State Constituency	Member	Coalition (Party)
N44	Sungai Rapat	Mohammad Nizar Jamaluddin	PH (AMANAH)
N45	Simpang Pulai	Wong Chai Yi	PH (PKR)
N46	Teja	Sandrea Ng Shy Ching	PH (PKR)

=== Local governments & postcodes ===
No.	State Constituency	Local Government	Postcodes
N44	Sungai Rapat	Ipoh City Council; Batu Gajah District Council (Sri Jaya and Seri Rahmat areas)	30200, 31350, 31400, 31500, 31650 Ipoh; 31000 Batu Gajah; 31300 Kampung Kepayang; 31550 Pusing; 31600, 31610 Gopeng
N45	Simpang Pulai	Ipoh City Council (Pulai Jaya area); Kampar District Council	30200, 31350, 31400, 31500, 31650 Ipoh; 31000 Batu Gajah; 31300 Kampung Kepayang; 31550 Pusing; 31600, 31610 Gopeng
N46	Teja	Kampar District Council	30200, 31350, 31400, 31500, 31650 Ipoh; 31000 Batu Gajah; 31300 Kampung Kepayang; 31550 Pusing; 31600, 31610 Gopeng

== Election results ==
Malaysian general election, 2022
Party	Candidate	Votes	%	∆%
PH	Tan Kar Hing	55,880	53.92	▲53.92
PN	Muhammad Farhan Abdul Rahim	28,732	27.72	▲27.72
BN	Ting Zhao Song	18,393	17.75	▼6.41
Heritage	Balachandran Gopal	633	0.61	▲0.61
Total valid votes		103,638	100.00	
Total rejected ballots		1,092		
Unreturned ballots		270		
Turnout		105,000	73.09	▼8.12
Registered electors		143,657		
Majority		27,148	26.20	▼9.38
PH hold		Swing		
Source(s) https://lom.agc.gov.my/ilims/upload/portal/akta/outputp/1753277/PUB610%20PARLIMEN%20PERAK.pdf

Malaysian general election, 2018
Party	Candidate	Votes	%	∆%
PKR	Lee Boon Chye	48,923	61.75	▲2.16
BN	Heng Seai Kie	19,145	24.16	▼16.25
PAS	Ismail Ariffin	11,165	14.09	▲14.09
Total valid votes		79,233	100.00	
Total rejected ballots		853		
Unreturned ballots		446		
Turnout		80,532	81.21	▼2.67
Registered electors		99,167		
Majority		29,778	35.58	▲16.40
PKR hold		Swing		
Source(s) "His Majesty's Government Gazette - Notice of Contested Election, Parliament for the State of Perak [P.U. (B) 237/2018]" (PDF). Attorney General's Chambers of Malaysia. 3 May 2018. "Federal Government Gazette - Results of Contested Election and Statements of the Poll after the Official Addition of Votes, Parliamentary Constituencies for the State of Perak [P.U. (B) 311/2018]" (PDF). Attorney General's Chambers of Malaysia. 28 May 2018.

Malaysian general election, 2013
Party	Candidate	Votes	%	∆%
PKR	Lee Boon Chye	47,558	59.59	▲2.51
BN	Tan Chin Meng	32,249	40.41	▼2.51
Total valid votes		79,807	100.00	
Total rejected ballots		1,456		
Unreturned ballots		179		
Turnout		81,442	83.88	▲12.18
Registered electors		97,092		
Majority		15,309	19.18	▲5.02
PKR hold		Swing		
Source(s) "Federal Government Gazette - Notice of Contested Election, Parliament for the State of Perak [P.U. (B) 174/2013]" (PDF). Attorney General's Chambers of Malaysia. 26 April 2013. Archived from the original (PDF) on 2019-12-29. "Federal Government Gazette - Results of Contested Election and Statements of the Poll after the Official Addition of Votes, Parliamentary Constituencies for the State of Perak [P.U. (B) 215/2013]" (PDF). Attorney General's Chambers of Malaysia. 22 May 2013.

Malaysian general election, 2008
Party	Candidate	Votes	%	∆%
PKR	Lee Boon Chye	29,696	57.08	▲23.20
BN	Ling Hee Leong	22,328	42.92	▼23.20
Total valid votes		52,024	100.00	
Total rejected ballots		1,279		
Unreturned ballots		0		
Turnout		53,303	71.70	▲2.23
Registered electors		74,344		
Majority		7,368	14.16	▼18.80
PKR gain from BN		Swing		?

Malaysian general election, 2004
Party	Candidate	Votes	%	∆%
BN	Ting Chew Peh	30,312	66.12	▲8.56
PKR	Lee Boon Chye	15,530	33.88	▲33.88
Total valid votes		45,842	100.00	
Total rejected ballots		1,491		
Unreturned ballots		233		
Turnout		47,566	69.47	▲0.30
Registered electors		68,469		
Majority		14,782	32.24	▲14.88
BN hold		Swing		

Malaysian general election, 1999
Party	Candidate	Votes	%	∆%
BN	Ting Chew Peh	21,254	57.56	▼16.48
DAP	Abd. Rahman Said Alli	14,848	40.20	▲14.44
MDP	Syed Ahmad Imdadz Said Abas	829	2.24	▲2.24
Total valid votes		36,931	100.00	
Total rejected ballots		819		
Unreturned ballots		669		
Turnout		38,419	69.17	▲1.16
Registered electors		55,542		
Majority		6,406	17.36	▼30.72
BN hold		Swing		

Malaysian general election, 1995
Party	Candidate	Votes	%	∆%
BN	Ting Chew Peh	22,774	74.04	▲11.40
DAP	Lim Meng Loong	7,986	25.96	▼11.40
Total valid votes		30,760	100.00	
Total rejected ballots		1,318		
Unreturned ballots		0		
Turnout		32,078	68.01	▼0.01
Registered electors		47,166		
Majority		14,788	48.08	▲22.80
BN hold		Swing		

Malaysian general election, 1990
Party	Candidate	Votes	%	∆%
BN	Ting Chew Peh	14,991	62.64	▲2.02
DAP	Hong Chin Poh	8,940	37.36	▼1.53
Total valid votes		23,931	100.00	
Total rejected ballots		794		
Unreturned ballots		0		
Turnout		24,725	68.02	
Registered electors		36,347		
Majority		6,051	25.28	▲3.55
BN hold		Swing		

Malaysian general by-election, 16 May 1987 Upon the resignation of incumbent, Tan Koon Swan, who was serving a prison term in Singapore.
Party	Candidate	Votes	%	∆%
BN	Ting Chew Peh	12,619	60.62	▲0.25
DAP	Ahmad Nor	8,096	38.89	▲4.96
Independent	Tan Kee Chye	103	0.49	▲0.49
Total valid votes		20,818	100.00	
Total rejected ballots				
Unreturned ballots				
Turnout				
Registered electors		34,142		
Majority		4,523	21.73	▼4.71
BN hold		Swing		

Malaysian general election, 1986
Party	Candidate	Votes	%
BN	Tan Koon Swan	14,009	60.37
DAP	Quek Swee Siang	7,874	33.93
PAS	Abdul Majid Salleh	981	4.23
SDP	Leong Wai Man	341	1.47
Total valid votes		23,205	100.00
Total rejected ballots		518	
Unreturned ballots		0	
Turnout		23,723	67.71
Registered electors		35,034	
Majority		6,135	26.44
This was a new constituency created.
