= Malaysian Nationalist Party =

Malaysian Nationalist Party Parti Nasionalis Malaysia PNM / NASMA
- Abbreviation: PNM or NASMA
- Founder: Zainab Yang (Leader), Zainad Mohammed (Secretary General)
- Founded: July 1985
- Legalised: October 1985
- Headquarters: Kuala Lumpur, Malaysia
- Membership (1990): 79,990
- Ideology: Multiracialism
- Political position: Center-right
- National affiliation: Harakah Keadilan Rakyat (1986–1990)
- Slogan: Malaysians for Malaysia, for justice, integrity and progress

Election symbol
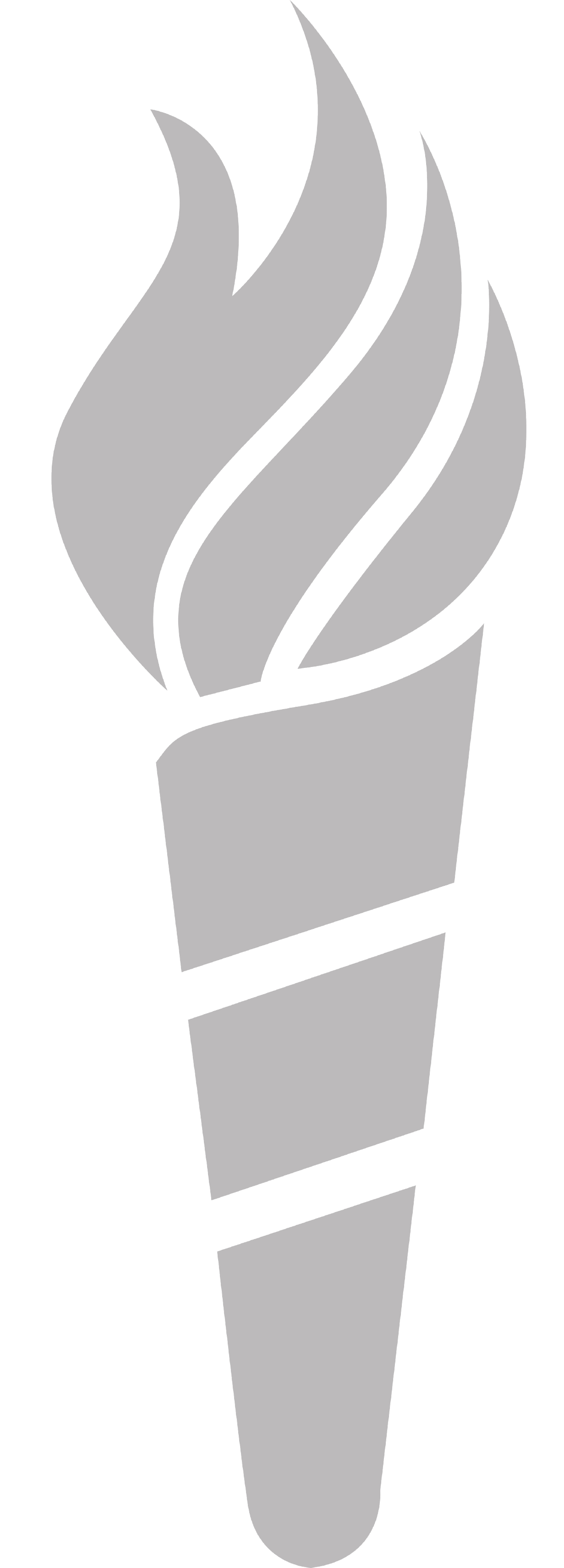

The Malaysian Nationalist Party or Malay: Parti Nasionalis Malaysia (PNM or NASMA) was a multi racial grouping launched in July 1985 under the banner "Malaysians for Malaysia, for justice, integrity and progress". Envisioned by its founders as a forum for nonsectarian critics of the Mahathir Mohamad regime as a challenge to the United Malays National Organisation (UMNO), the party's main accomplishment by late 1985 was weakening Pan-Malaysian Islamic Party (PAS) expansion effort.

== History ==
The party were launched in July 1985 and formed by mostly urban Malay with civil service background. It were legalized by ROS three months later. However, on 9 December 1985, the pro tem president, Hajah Zainab Yang was replaced by Raja Datuk Nasron Ishak. 30 branches were created under Raja Datuk Nasron. On 2 February 1986, inaugural delegates conferences were called upon by five founding members. 8 founders resigned on the conferences, including Hajah Zainab Yang.

In 1986 Malaysian general election, the party, led by Raja Datuk Nasron, contested in 4 parliamentary seats and 9 state seats, losing all. 8 of their candidates also lost their deposit.

== List of leaders ==
President

Order	Name	Term of office		Remarks
1	Hajah Zainab Yang	July 1986	9 December 1986	
2	Raja Datuk Nasron Ishak	9 December 1985	1 January 1986	
3	Hajah Zainab Yang	2 February 1986	3 February 1986	
4	Raja Datuk Nasron Ishak	3 February 1986	August 1986	

Deputy President

Order	Name	Term of office		Remarks
1	Hajah Zainab Yang	9 December 1985	1986	
2	Ahmad Nor	2 February 1986	3 February 1986	

== General election results ==
Election	Total seats won	Seats contested	Share of seats	Total votes	Share of votes	Outcome of election	Election leader
1986	0 / 177	4	0	10,228	0.22	; No representation in Parliament	Raja Datuk Nasron Ishak

=== State elections ===
State election	State Legislative Assembly				
State election	Penang	Selangor	Negeri Sembilan	Malacca	Total won / Total contested
1986	0 / 33	0 / 42	0 / 28	0 / 20	0 / 9

== See also ==
- Kongres Rakyat Malaysia - splinter party formed by Zainab Yang
- Politics of Malaysia
- List of political parties in Malaysia
