= Zahrain Mohamed Hashim =

Malaysian politician

Yang Berbahagia Dato' Seri Zahrain Mohamed Hashim DGPN DSPN
- ظاهرين محمد هاشم

16th Ambassador of Malaysia to Indonesia
- In office 5 September 2013 – 30 June 2018
- Monarchs: Abdul Halim (2013–2016); Muhammad V (2016–2018)
- Prime Minister: Najib Razak (2013–2018); Mahathir Mohamad (2018)
- Preceded by: Syed Munshe Afdzaruddin Syed Hassan
- Succeeded by: Zainal Abidin Bakar

Member of the Malaysian Parliament for Bayan Baru
- In office 8 March 2008 – 5 May 2013
- Preceded by: Wong Kam Hoong (BN–MCA)
- Succeeded by: Sim Tze Tzin (PR–PKR)
- Majority: 11,029 (2008)

Personal details
- Born: 12 November 1953 (age 72) Penang, Federation of Malaya (now Malaysia)
- Party: People's Justice Party (PKR) (–2010); Independent (since 2010)
- Occupation: Politician

Zahrain bin Mohamed Hashim (born 12 November 1953) is a Malaysian politician previously from the People's Justice Party (PKR), a component party of then Pakatan Rakyat (PR) opposition coalition who served as the 16th Ambassador of Malaysia to Indonesia from September 2013 to June 2018 and Member of Parliament (MP) for Bayan Baru from March 2008 to May 2013. He is now an independent after leaving PR and PKR.

== Political career ==
Zahrain was elected to Parliament in the 2008 election as a member of the opposition People's Justice Party (PKR). As Chairman of the Penang division of PKR, he had been criticised by his Pakatan Rakyat coalition partner, the Democratic Action Party, for speaking out against Penang Chief Minister Lim Guan Eng. In January 2010, he attacked Lim as being a "dictator, a chauvinist and communist-minded", citing what Zahrain saw as a failure by Lim to deliver on his election promises. He subsequently left PKR to sit in Parliament as an independent.

== Diplomatic career ==
After leaving Parliament following the 2013 general elections, Zahrain was appointed the Malaysian Ambassador to Indonesia.

Zahrain was recalled from his posting following the Pakatan Harapan (PH) government's decision to stop the previous practice adopted by the Barisan Nasional (BN) of appointing politicians to head overseas missions.

== Election results ==
Parliament of Malaysia
Year	Constituency	Candidate	Votes	Pct	Opponent(s)	Votes	Pct	Ballots Cast	Majority	Turnout
2008	P052 Bayan Baru	Zahrain Mohamed Hashim (PKR)	27,618	62.47%	Ooi Siew Kim (MCA)	16,589	37.53%	46,418	11,029	76.45%

== Honours ==
- Penang
  - Commander of the Order of the Defender of State (DGPN) – Dato' Seri (2009)
  - Officer of the Order of the Defender of State (DSPN) – Dato' (1995)

== See also ==
- Bayan Baru (federal constituency)

Diplomatic posts
Preceded by Syed Munshe Afdzaruddin Syed Hassan	Ambassador of Malaysia to Indonesia; 2013–2018	Succeeded by Zainal Abidin Bakar
