= Pan-Electric Industries =

Singapore marine salvage company

Pan-Electric Industries was a Singapore-based company that specialised in marine salvage work, and had 71 subsidiary companies, including hotel and property interests, with a market capitalization of S$230 million. The company collapsed in December 1985 due to massive unsettled forward contracts, forcing the Stock Exchange of Singapore (SES) and Kuala Lumpur Stock Exchange (KLSE) to shut down for three days. At its demise, the company had a total debt of S$480 million, and all its shares held by 5,500 shareholders were found to be worthless overnight. As of 2000, it remains the largest corporate collapse in Singapore's history, and the only instance where the SES had to be unexpectedly closed.

In the aftermath of the collapse, key people in the company such as Peter Tham, Tan Kok Liang, and Tan Koon Swan were prosecuted and given varying jail sentences. The collapse of the company shook public confidence in the SES, causing prices of stocks to plunge and resulted in the bankruptcy of some stockbroking firms. New securities laws were introduced in March 1986 to ensure that stockbroking firms could protect themselves against credit risks.
