= Ting Chew Peh =

Malaysian politician

Yang Berbahagia Tan Sri Dato' Seri Ting Chew Peh PSM SPMP DPMP DPMS
- 陈祖排

Minister of Housing and Local Government
- In office 27 October 1990 – 14 December 1999
- Monarchs: Sultan Azlan Shah; Tuanku Ja'afar
- Prime Minister: Mahathir Mohamad
- Deputy: Daud Taha (1990–1995); Osu Sukam (1990–1994); Jeffrey Kitingan (1994–1995)
- Preceded by: Lee Kim Sai
- Succeeded by: Ong Ka Ting
- Constituency: Gopeng

Member of the Malaysian Parliament for Gopeng, Perak
- In office 16 May 1987 – 8 March 2008
- Preceded by: Tan Koon Swan (BN–MCA)
- Succeeded by: Lee Boon Chye (PR–PKR)
- Majority: 4,523 (1987); 6,051 (1990); 14,788 (1995); 6,406 (1999); 14,782 (2004)

Secretary-General of the Malaysian Chinese Association
- In office July 1990 – 30 August 2005
- Preceded by: Ng Cheng Kiat
- Succeeded by: Ong Ka Chuan

Personal details
- Born: 21 March 1943 (age 83)
- Party: Malaysian Chinese Association (MCA)
- Other political affiliations: Barisan Nasional (BN); Perikatan Nasional (PN)
- Education: University of Malaya; University of London; University of Warwick
- Occupation: Politician
- Profession: Associate professor

Ting Chew Peh (simplified Chinese: 陈祖排; traditional Chinese: 陳袓排; pinyin: Chén Zhǔpái; born 1943) is a Malaysian politician from the Malaysian Chinese Association (MCA), a component party of the Barisan Nasional (BN) coalition. He was the former member of the Parliament of Malaysia for the Gopeng constituency in Perak for five terms from 1987 to 2008. At the grassroots level, he was known for being the MCA former secretary-general for fifteen years from 1990 to 2005.

He is also the chairman of University Council for Universiti Tunku Abdul Rahman (UTAR) in Malaysia.

== Politics and career ==
Ting graduated with a Bachelor of Arts degree from the University of Malaya in 1970 and obtained a master's degree in sociology from the University of London in 1972. He also holds a doctorate in philosophy, which he obtained from the University of Warwick in 1976.

Ting started his career as a lecturer in the Faculty of Humanities and Social Sciences at the National University of Malaysia (UKM) from 1974 to 1980 and was subsequently an associate professor at the faculty until 1987. He joined the MCA in 1981 at the age of 38, but continued to be very vocal on issues affecting the Chinese community, particularly on education and culture and the MCA's role, through newspaper articles.

Ting was elected to Parliament of Malaysia in the 1987 Gopeng by-election following the resignation of incumbent, Tan Koon Swan, who was serving a prison term in Singapore for the Pan-El case.

He was then appointed as the Minister of Housing and Local Government in 1990, a post he held until 1999, by Prime Minister Mahathir Mohamad. In 1990 and 1995 general elections he won the Gopeng parliamentary seat under the BN – MCA ticket. In 1999 general election Ting retained Gopeng with a majority of 6406. He defeated Syed Ahmad Said Abas (MDP) and Abdul Rahman Said Alli (DAP). In 2004 general election, he defeated Dr Lee Boon Chye of PKR with a majority of 14,260 votes.

During the MCA General Assembly in 2005, for the MCA deputy president election, Ting got 738 votes was beaten by Chan Kong Choy with 1315 votes.

In the 2008 general election, his name was dropped together with other MCA leaders likes Datuk Chua Jui Meng (Bakri), Datuk Loke Yuen Yow (Tanjung Malim), Datuk Yap Pian Hon (Serdang), Datuk Wong Kam Hoong (Bayan Baru) dan Tan Yee Kew (Klang).

In the business sector, Ting was the chairman of the Port Klang Authority (LPK) in 2002 and was questioned on 3 September 2009 by PAC following Port Klang Free Zone losses. PKK's chairman received only RM2,259.95 per month allowance. Each board member gets an allowance of RM500 a month. As LPK chairman. Ting did not get big salaries.

He was also the Independent non-executive director of Puncak Niaga Holdings Berhad.

== Election results ==
Parliament of Malaysia
Year	Constituency	Candidate	Votes	Pct	Opponent(s)	Votes	Pct	Ballots cast	Majority	Turnout
1987	P064 Gopeng	Ting Chew Peh (MCA)	12,619	60.62%	Ahmad Nor (DAP)	8,096	38.89%	N/A	4,523	N/A
1987	P064 Gopeng	Ting Chew Peh (MCA)	12,619	60.62%	Tan Kee Chye (IND)	103	0.49%	N/A	4,523	N/A
1990	P064 Gopeng	Ting Chew Peh (MCA)	14,991	62.64%	Hong Chin Poh (DAP)	8,940	37.36%	24,725	6,051	68.02%
1995	P067 Gopeng	Ting Chew Peh (MCA)	22,774	74.04%	Lim Meng Loong (DAP)	7,986	25.96%	32,078	14,788	68.01%
1999	P067 Gopeng	Ting Chew Peh (MCA)	21,254	57.56%	Abdul Rahman Said Alli (DAP)	14,848	40.20%	38,419	6,406	69.17%
1999	P067 Gopeng	Ting Chew Peh (MCA)	21,254	57.56%	Syed Ahmad Imdadz Said Abas (MDP)	829	2.24%	38,419	6,406	69.17%
2004	P071 Gopeng	Ting Chew Peh (MCA)	30,312	66.12%	Lee Boon Chye (PKR)	15,530	33.88%	47,566	14,782	69.47%

== Honours ==
- Malaysia
  - Commander of the Order of Loyalty to the Crown of Malaysia (PSM) – Tan Sri (2003)
- Perak
  - Knight Grand Commander of the Order of the Perak State Crown (SPMP) – Dato' Seri (2001)
  - Knight Commander of the Order of the Perak State Crown (DPMP) – Dato' (1992)
- Selangor
  - Knight Commander of the Order of the Crown of Selangor (DPMS) – Dato' (1996)

== Book ==
The Chinese in Peninsular Malaysia: a study of race relations in a plural society, 1976
