= Tan Koon Swan =

Malaysian politician

Yang Berbahagia Tan Sri Tan Koon Swan PSM
- 陈群川

5th President of the Malaysian Chinese Association (MCA)
- In office 24 November 1985 – 27 August 1986
- BN chairman: Mahathir Mohamad
- Preceded by: Lee San Choon
- Succeeded by: Ling Liong Sik

Member of the Malaysian Parliament for Gopeng, Perak
- In office 1986–1987
- Preceded by: Constituency created
- Succeeded by: Ting Chew Peh (MCA)
- Majority: 6,135 (1986)

Member of the Malaysian Parliament for Damansara, Kuala Lumpur
- In office 1982–1986
- Preceded by: V. David (DAP)
- Succeeded by: Constituency abolished
- Majority: 14,522 (1982)

Member of the Malaysian Parliament for Raub, Pahang
- In office 1978–1982
- Preceded by: Abdullah Majid (UMNO)
- Succeeded by: Tan Tiong Hong (MCA)
- Majority: 5,964 (1978)

Personal details
- Born: 24 September 1940 (age 85) Puchong New Village, Selangor, British Malaya (now Malaysia)
- Party: Malayan Chinese Association (MCA)
- Other political affiliations: Barisan Nasional (BN)
- Spouse(s): Catherine Chong (1st); Penny Chang (2nd)
- Relations: Tan Loon Swan (brother)
- Children: 2 children by 1st wife 3 daughters by 2nd wife
- Occupation: Politician, Businessman

Chinese name
- Traditional Chinese: 陳群川
- Simplified Chinese: 陈群川
Transcriptions
Standard Mandarin
- Hanyu Pinyin: Chén Qúnchuān
Southern Min
- Hokkien POJ: Tân Kûn-chhoan

Tan Koon Swan (simplified Chinese: 陈群川; traditional Chinese: 陳群川; pinyin: Chén Qúnchuān; Pe̍h-ōe-jī: Tân Kûn-chhoan; born 24 September 1940) is a Malaysian political and corporate figure. He was the fifth president of the Malaysian Chinese Association (MCA), a component party of Barisan Nasional (BN) coalition; from November 1985 to September 1986.

== Personal life ==
Tan was born in Puchong New Village in Selangor on 24 September 1940 to a poor family. He helped out at his parents' hawker stall while still in school. He studied in a missionary school, and after leaving school, he worked as a clerk with Lembaga Lektrik Negara (LLN) while studying part-time to finish his High School Certificate (HSC). He also worked as a laboratory technician with LLN, then moved on to be an investigator of Inland Revenue Board and a tax consultant with Esso.

Tan married his first wife, Catherine Chong, who is a paraplegic and has two children with her. He then got together with his second wife, Penny Chang, fathering another three daughters.

Tan, after facing many hiccups in life, is still a respected member of society. He is a born-again Christian who likes to maintain a low profile.

== Political and business career ==
In 1970, Tan became the General Manager of Genting Highlands Berhad, helping Lim Goh Tong to establish Genting Highlands Resort as a successful tourist destination. In 1976, he attended a senior management course at Harvard University.

In 1977, he was invited by the then MCA president Lee San Choon to head the Koperatif Sebaguna Malaysia (KSM) and Multi-Purpose Holdings Berhad (MPHB), the corporate structure through which the MCA hoped to encourage Chinese participation in all areas of economic development. He joined the party and became involved in politics.

In 1978 general election, Tan made his political debut and elected as the Member of Parliament (MP), winning a parliamentary seat in Raub, Pahang. The following year, he was elected to the party's Central Committee and appointed Chairman of MCA Wilayah Persekutuan State Liaison Committee. In 1982 general election, he cinched a landslide victory for the parliamentary seat in the opposition stronghold of Damansara, Selangor. 1984 saw him appointed as vice-president of the MCA.

In March 1984, Tan was sacked as vice-president from the MCA along with Lee Kim Sai as well as other members for urging the party to investigate its member records for the presence of non-existent people, an issue that had sparked off factionalism and crisis within the party. However, he and the other 13 were all reinstated two months later with the support of 1,600 MCA members in an extraordinary general meeting. In November 1985, he was voted to be president of the MCA winning 76.9% of the votes cast, the largest majority in the party's history, and the first challenger since 1954 to win national leadership.

In a memoir published by Robert Kuok, it was revealed that the MCA leadership approached Kuok to provide a bail payment for Tan in 1986. The amount paid by Kuok was S$20 million.

== Controversies and issues ==
=== Pan-El crisis ===
Tan remained a highly prominent member of the corporate sector, controlling numerous companies, including Sigma International, which had a 22.6% stake in Pan-Electric Industries (Pan-El), a Singaporean-based company. Pan-Electric entering receivership forced the closure of the Singapore and Kuala Lumpur stock exchanges between 2 and 4 December 1985, to try to contain the fallout on leveraged stockbroking firms. On 12 December 1985, Tan signed an agreement that gave the troubled company S$ 20 million of funds through an interest-free loan and allowed it to resume trading.

In 1986, he was charged in Singapore with abetting criminal breach of trust relating to the collapse of Pan-El. He was convicted and sentenced to two years imprisonment by Singapore High Court Justice Lai Kew Chai. In Lai's judgement, Lai said Tan's offences had "struck at the very heart, integrity, reputation and confidence of Singapore as a commercial city and financial centre". After his sentencing, Tan in 1987 relinquished his position as MCA President and MP for Gopeng, Perak that he just won in 1986 general election earlier.

In 1988, Tan was also sentenced and imprisoned in Malaysia, declared a bankrupt, and reportedly owed over RM 400 million, at the time roughly equivalent to more than 100 million US dollars. He was ordered to pay RM1000 a month to the Official Assignee and the New Straits Times estimated it would take him 35,316 years to pay off his outstanding claims. In the mid-1990s, after full repayment, Tan was discharged from bankruptcy.

In 2012, a book by the former chief prosecutor Glenn Knight revealed that Chief Justice Yong Pung How stated in a 1996 hearing that Tan Koon Swan had been wrongfully charged in the Pan-El case. However, the book has been heavily criticised as containing factual errors.

== Election results ==
Parliament of Malaysia
Year	Constituency	Candidate	Votes	Pct	Opponent(s)	Votes	Pct	Ballots cast	Majority	Turnout
1978	P068 Raub	Tan Koon Swan (MCA)	11,411	56.16%	Wan Sai Kai (DAP)	5,447	26.81%	N/A	5,964	N/A
1978	P068 Raub	Tan Koon Swan (MCA)	11,411	56.16%	Tengku Puji Tengku Abd Hamid (PAS)	3,462	17.04%	N/A	5,964	N/A
1982	P086 Damansara	Tan Koon Swan (MCA)	34,659	59.43%	V. David (DAP)	20,137	34.53%	58,772	14,522	67.88%
1982	P086 Damansara	Tan Koon Swan (MCA)	34,659	59.43%	Ramli Mohamed Yasin (PAS)	3,527	6.05%	58,772	14,522	67.88%
1986	P064 Gopeng	Tan Koon Swan (MCA) ^{1}	14,009	60.37%	Quek Swee Siang (DAP)	7,874	33.93%	23,723	6,135	67.71%
1986	P064 Gopeng	Tan Koon Swan (MCA) ^{1}	14,009	60.37%	Abdul Majid Salleh (PAS)	981	4.23%	23,723	6,135	67.71%
1986	P064 Gopeng	Tan Koon Swan (MCA) ^{1}	14,009	60.37%	Leong Wai Man (SDP)	341	1.47%	23,723	6,135	67.71%

Note: ^{1} Incumbent Tan Koon Swan had resigned in 1987 after his conviction in the Pan-El case in 1986.

== Awards and recognition ==
- The World Chinese Economic Forum awarded Tan a lifetime achievement award in November 2012.

=== Honours of Malaysia ===
- Malaysia
  - Commander of the Order of Loyalty to the Crown of Malaysia (PSM) – Tan Sri (2016)

== See also ==
- Raub (federal constituency)
- Damansara (federal constituency)
- Gopeng (federal constituency)

Political offices
Preceded by Lee San Choon	Malaysian Chinese Association (MCA) President; 24 November 1985 – 27 August 1986	Succeeded by Ling Liong Sik
