= Ling Liong Sik =

Malaysian politician (1943–2026)

Yang Amat Berbahagia Tun Ling Liong Sik SSM DGSM SPMP PNBS DPMS DPMP
- 林良实
- Ling in 2015

Prime Minister of Malaysia Acting
- Covering duties 4 February 1988 – 16 February 1988
- Monarch: Iskandar
- Preceded by: Mahathir Mohamad
- Succeeded by: Mahathir Mohamad

Chancellor of UTAR
- In office 18 January 2017 – 4 April 2026
- Preceded by: Position established
- Succeeded by: TBA

6th President of the MCA
- In office 3 September 1986 – 23 May 2003
- BN chairman: Mahathir Mohamad
- Preceded by: Tan Koon Swan
- Succeeded by: Ong Ka Ting
Ministerial offices
Minister of Transport
In office 7 January 1986 – 23 May 2003
| Monarchs | Iskandar of Johor; Azlan Shah; Ja'afar; Salahuddin; Sirajuddin |
| Prime Minister | Mahathir Mohamad |
| Deputy | Rahmah Othman (1984‍–‍1987); Zaleha Ismail (1987–1995); Mohd Ali Rustam (1995‍–‍1996); Ibrahim Saad (1996–1999); Ramli Ngah Talib (1999‍–‍2004); Douglas Uggah Embas (2001‍–‍2004) |
| Preceded by | Chong Hon Nyan |
| Succeeded by | Chan Kong Choy |
| Constituency | Labis |
Deputy Minister of Education I
In office 25 March 1985 – 7 January 1986 Serving with Bujang Ulis (Deputy Minister of Education II)
| Monarch | Iskandar |
| Prime Minister | Mahathir Mohamad |
| Minister | Abdullah Ahmad Badawi |
| Constituency | Mata Kuching |
Deputy Minister of Finance II
In office 30 April 1982 – 16 July 1984 Serving with Sabbaruddin Chik (Deputy Minister of Finance I)
| Monarch | Ahmad Shah |
| Prime Minister | Mahathir Mohamad |
| Minister | Tengku Razaleigh Hamzah |
| Constituency | Mata Kuching |
Deputy Minister of Information
In office 1978–1982
| Monarch | Ahmad Shah |
| Minister | Mohamed Rahmat |
| Constituency | Mata Kuching |
Parliamentary Secretary of the Ministry of Local Government and Federal Territories
In office 1976–1978
| Monarch | Yahya Petra |
| Minister | Hassan Adli Arshad |
| Deputy | Subramaniam Sinniah |
| Constituency | Mata Kuching |

Faction represented in Dewan Rakyat
- 1974–2004: Barisan Nasional

Personal details
- Born: 18 September 1943 Kuala Kangsar, Perak, Japanese-occupied Malaya
- Died: 4 April 2026 (aged 82) Kuala Lumpur, Malaysia
- Resting place: Xiao En Memorial Park
- Citizenship: Malaysian
- Party: MCA (1968–2026)
- Other political affiliations: Alliance; Barisan Nasional (BN)
- Spouse: Ong Ee Nah (王维娜)
- Education: Royal Military College
- Alma mater: University of Singapore
- Occupation: Politician; physician

Ling Liong Sik (simplified Chinese: 林良实; traditional Chinese: 林良實; pinyin: Lín Liángshí; Foochow Romanized: Lìng Liòng-sĭk; 18 September 1943 – 4 April 2026) was a Malaysian politician. He was the sixth president of the Malaysian Chinese Association (MCA), a component party of Barisan Nasional (BN) coalition and also Minister of Transport. Malaysian Prime Minister Najib Razak filed the suit against Ling on 2015, alleging that Ling had made libellous remarks against him in an article carried on a news portal.

Ling was the chancellor and a past chairman of the Universiti Tunku Abdul Rahman (UTAR). UTAR's Dewan Tun Dr. Ling Liong Sik is named in honour of him.

On 27 October 2015, Prime Minister Najib Razak sued Ling Liong Sik for allegedly implying that he had misused public funds for his personal interests. On 22 May 2018, Najib withdrew his defamation suit against Ling over the alleged misuse of public funds.

== Early life ==
Ling was born on 18 September 1943, at Kuala Kangsar, Perak, Japanese-occupied Malaya. He received his primary education at King Edward VII School in Taiping, Perak from 1950 to 1957, and his secondary education at the Royal Military College in Port Dickson, Negri Sembilan from 1958 to 1960. Ling went on to pursue his higher education at the University of Singapore in 1961, graduating with a MBBS medical degree in 1966. His first post-varsity occupation involved a move to the Pearl of the Orient, where he was stationed as a physician in Penang General Hospital from 1966 to 1968. Ling later left the hospital to set up his own private practice in Butterworth, Province Wellesley from 1968 to 1975.

== Education ==
Ling studied in Royal Military College (Malaysia) in 1956. He graduated as a medical doctor from University of Singapore in 1966. Subsequently, he set up his practice in Penang.

== Political career ==
Ling joined the MCA in 1968. In 1974, he was elected as Member of Parliament for Mata Kuching, Penang and became a Central Committee member of the party in the same year. He was successfully reelected in 1978 and 1982. In 1986, Ling Liong Sik moved to Labis parliamentary seat in Johor and was elected Member of Parliament of the seat. He also subsequently successfully defended his position in the 1990, 1995 and 1999 general elections. He was elected in 1986 as the sixth President of the MCA, replacing Tan Koon Swan; he held this position for almost 17 years until his retirement in 2003.

Ling Liong Sik was first appointed Parliamentary Secretary of the Ministry of Local Government and Federal Territories. He later served as Deputy Minister of Information, Deputy Minister of Finance and Deputy Minister of Education. On 7 January 1986, he was appointed Minister of Transport until his retirement on 23 May 2003.

=== Acting Prime Minister ===
In 1988, Ling was briefly the acting Prime Minister from 4 to 16 February 1988, due to an internal struggle between different factions in UMNO, leading to a legal challenge and the deregistration of UMNO.

== Post political career ==
=== UTAR chancellor ===
On 18 January 2017, Ling was installed as University Tunku Abdul Rahman's (UTAR) first chancellor during the university's 24th convocation ceremony.

=== Najib Razak defamation case ===
On 27 October 2015, Prime Minister Najib Razak filed a suit against Ling Liong Sik for allegedly defaming him. Ling had made remarks in an article entitled "MCA's Liong Sik joins call for Najib's ouster for allegedly putting people's money in his own pocket" which were published in the Malay Mail online portal.

Ling was quoted saying in the article that he agreed with former prime minister Mahathir Mohamad's call for Najib to resign, claiming that Najib "has taken people's money and put it in his own personal accounts".

On 13 January 2016, Najib said Ling Liong Sik did not act as a bona fide "elder statesman". In his reply to Ling's defence and counter-claim against his suit for defamation, Najib said Ling had acted recklessly and with mala fide (bad intention) to tarnish his image and reputation.

On 18 February 2016, Ling Liong Sik spared no bullets in his latest attack on Prime Minister Najib Razak. According to Ling, there is nothing wrong with UMNO and BN.

It is only Najib and (the prime minister's wife) Rosmah.

We remove Najib and Rosmah, the country will return to normal. Peace, stability and progress will return to Malaysia.

On 18 July 2016, The High Court in Kuala Lumpur dismissed Mahathir's affidavit in support of Ling Liong Sik's application to strike out Najib's suit. In her decision made in chambers, Justice Nor Bee Ariffin considered the affidavit filed by Mahathir as hearsay.

On 23 December 2016, The High Court fixed 23 March 2017, to decide on an application by Ling Liong Sik to strike out a suit filed against him by Najib.

On 22 February 2017, the court deferred a decision on the application, on the grounds that Najib could sue in his capacity as a public official.

On 8 January 2018, The High Court in Kuala Lumpur postponed the hearing of the defamation suit. According to Najib's lawyer Nor Emelia Iszeham, the court had yet to dispose of Ling's application to strike out the suit, filed in February 2016, which would push the hearing to April 2018.

On 16 March 2018, Ling failed to strike out the suit filed by Najib. Kuala Lumpur High Court judge Justice Nor Bee Arifin said the matter should go on trial to see whether Najib has the legal standing in the suit.

On 22 May 2018, Najib withdrew his defamation suit against Ling over the alleged misuse of public funds. Ling's lawyer Ranjit Singh told reporters after meeting High Court judicial commissioner Goon Siew Chye in chambers that Najib decided to withdraw the suit against his client and the court ordered him to pay a RM25,000 in costs.

== Personal life and death ==
Ling was married to Toh Puan Ong Ee Nah and had two sons.

Ling died in Kuala Lumpur on 4 April 2026, at the age of 82.

== Election results ==
Parliament of Malaysia
| Year | Constituency | Candidate | Votes | Pct | Opponent(s) | Votes | Pct | Ballots cast | Majority | Turnout |
|---|---|---|---|---|---|---|---|---|---|---|
| 1974 | P036 Mata Kuching | Ling Liong Sik (MCA) | 13,755 | 53.97% | Ong Yi How (PEKEMAS) | 8,457 | 33.18% | 26,354 | 5,298 | 83.97% |
| 1974 | P036 Mata Kuching | Ling Liong Sik (MCA) | 13,755 | 53.97% | Goh Lim Eam (DAP) | 3,273 | 12.84% | 26,354 | 5,298 | 83.97% |
| 1978 | P036 Mata Kuching | Ling Liong Sik (MCA) | 23,564 | 65.27% | Loh Kim Heng (SDP) | 8,365 | 23.17% | N/A | 15,199 | N/A |
| 1978 | P036 Mata Kuching | Ling Liong Sik (MCA) | 23,564 | 65.27% | Abdul Hamid Abdullah (PAS) | 5,298 | 11.56% | N/A | 15,199 | N/A |
| 1982 | P036 Mata Kuching | Ling Liong Sik (MCA) | 26,995 | 62.11% | Goh Sin Khoon (DAP) | 14,839 | 34.14% | 44,646 | 12,156 | 77.46% |
| 1982 | P036 Mata Kuching | Ling Liong Sik (MCA) | 26,995 | 62.11% | Raja Mohamed Raja Sulaiman (IND) | 1,626 | 3.74% | 44,646 | 12,156 | 77.46% |
| 1986 | P118 Labis | Ling Liong Sik (MCA) | 18,182 | 67.96% | Tan Tien Lim (DAP) | 8,571 | 32.04% | 27,650 | 9,611 | 72.26% |
| 1990 | P118 Labis | Ling Liong Sik (MCA) | 17,710 | 58.65% | Ahmad Ton (DAP) | 12,485 | 41.35% | 31,292 | 5,225 | 74.06% |
| 1995 | P128 Labis | Ling Liong Sik (MCA) | 24,185 | 72.57% | Ahmad Ton (DAP) | 9,140 | 27.43% | 34,693 | 15,045 | 73.17% |
| 1999 | P128 Labis | Ling Liong Sik (MCA) | 23,709 | 70.53% | Ahmad Ton (DAP) | 9,908 | 29.47% | 34,775 | 13,801 | 71.44% |

== Honours ==
=== Honours of Malaysia ===
- Malaysia
  - Grand Commander of the Order of Loyalty to the Crown of Malaysia (SSM) – Tun (2004)
- Perak
  - Knight Grand Commander of the Order of the Perak State Crown (SPMP) – Dato' Seri (1989)
  - Knight Commander of the Order of the Perak State Crown (DPMP) – Dato' (1982)
- Selangor
  - Knight Commander of the Order of the Crown of Selangor (DPMS) – Dato' (1992)
- Malacca
  - Grand Commander of the Exalted Order of Malacca (DGSM) – Datuk Seri (1993)
- Sarawak
  - Knight Commander of the Most Exalted Order of the Star of Sarawak (PNBS) – Dato Sri (2003)

== See also ==
- Mata Kuching (federal constituency)
- Labis (federal constituency)

Political offices
| Preceded by Tan Koon Swan | Malaysian Chinese Association (MCA) President; 3 September 1986 – 23 May 2003 | Succeeded by Ong Ka Ting |
