= 1986 Malaysian state elections =

State assembly elections were held in Malaysia on 3 August 1986 in all states except Sabah (where they were held on 4 and 5 May 1986) and Sarawak (where they were not held until the following year).

== Results ==
=== Johor ===
Party or alliance		Votes	%	Seats	+/–
Barisan Nasional	United Malays National Organisation	359,878		22	+2
Barisan Nasional	Malaysian Chinese Association	359,878		10	0
Barisan Nasional	Malaysian Indian Congress	359,878		2	+1
Barisan Nasional	Parti Gerakan Rakyat Malaysia	359,878		1	0
Barisan Nasional	Total	359,878		35	+3
Democratic Action Party		73,653		1	+1
Pan-Malaysian Islamic Party		47,184		0	0
Total				36	+4

=== Kedah ===
Party or alliance		Votes	%	Seats	+/–
Barisan Nasional	United Malays National Organisation	209,273	49.43	20	+1
Barisan Nasional	Malaysian Chinese Association	28,801	6.80	3	0
Barisan Nasional	Malaysian Indian Congress	10,020	2.37	1	0
Barisan Nasional	Parti Gerakan Rakyat Malaysia	8,605	2.03	1	0
Barisan Nasional	Total	256,699	60.63	25	+1
Harakah Keadilan Rakyat	Pan-Malaysian Islamic Party	149,546	35.32	3	+1
Harakah Keadilan Rakyat	Social Democratic Party	134	0.03	0	0
Harakah Keadilan Rakyat	Total	149,680	35.35	3	+1
Democratic Action Party		17,035	4.02	0	0
Total		423,414	100.00	28	+2
Valid votes		423,414	96.88		
Invalid/blank votes		13,619	3.12		
Total votes		437,033	100.00		
Registered voters/turnout		598,594	73.01		
Source: Almanak Keputusan Pilihan Raya Umum: Parlimen & Dewan Undangan Negeri (1959-1999)

=== Kelantan ===
Party or alliance		Votes	%	Seats	+/–
Barisan Nasional	United Malays National Organisation	159,124	46.43	26	+5
Barisan Nasional	Parti Hizbul Muslimin Malaysia	17,324	5.05	2	New
Barisan Nasional	Malaysian Chinese Association	6,729	1.96	1	0
Barisan Nasional	Total	183,177	53.44	29	+3
Harakah Keadilan Rakyat	Pan-Malaysian Islamic Party	157,748	46.02	10	0
Harakah Keadilan Rakyat	Total	157,748	46.02	10	0
Democratic Action Party		1,821	0.53	0	0
Total		342,746	100.00	39	+3
Valid votes		342,746	96.64		
Invalid/blank votes		11,935	3.36		
Total votes		354,681	100.00		
Registered voters/turnout		469,828	75.49		
Source: Almanak Keputusan Pilihan Raya Umum: Parlimen & Dewan Undangan Negeri (1959-1999)

=== Malacca ===
Party or alliance		Seats	+/–
Barisan Nasional	United Malays National Organisation	12	–1
Barisan Nasional	Malaysian Chinese Association	4	–1
Barisan Nasional	Malaysian Indian Congress	1	+1
Barisan Nasional	Total	17	–1
Democratic Action Party		3	+1
Pan-Malaysian Islamic Party		0	0
Total		20	0

=== Negeri Sembilan ===
Party or alliance		Seats	+/–
Barisan Nasional	United Malays National Organisation	18	+3
Barisan Nasional	Malaysian Chinese Association	4	–2
Barisan Nasional	Malaysian Indian Congress	2	+1
Barisan Nasional	Total	24	+2
Democratic Action Party		4	+2
Pan-Malaysian Islamic Party		0	0
Total		28	+4

=== Pahang ===
Party or alliance		Seats	+/–
Barisan Nasional	United Malays National Organisation	25	+1
Barisan Nasional	Malaysian Chinese Association	5	0
Barisan Nasional	Parti Gerakan Rakyat Malaysia	1	0
Barisan Nasional	Malaysian Indian Congress	1	0
Barisan Nasional	Total	32	+1
Democratic Action Party		1	0
Pan-Malaysian Islamic Party		0	0
Total		33	+1

=== Penang ===
Party or alliance		Votes	%	Seats	+/–
Barisan Nasional	Parti Gerakan Rakyat Malaysia	79,219	21.32	9	+1
Barisan Nasional	United Malays National Organisation	62,554	16.84	12	+2
Barisan Nasional	Malaysian Chinese Association	44,341	11.93	2	–4
Barisan Nasional	Malaysian Indian Congress	3,445	0.93	0	–1
Barisan Nasional	Total	189,559	51.02	23	–2
Democratic Action Party		138,843	37.37	10	+8
Harakah Keadilan Rakyat	Pan-Malaysian Islamic Party	29,913	8.05	0	0
Harakah Keadilan Rakyat	Parti Sosialis Rakyat Malaysia	6,214	1.67	0	0
Harakah Keadilan Rakyat	Social Democratic Party	975	0.26	0	0
Harakah Keadilan Rakyat	Malaysian Nationalist Party	248	0.07	0	0
Harakah Keadilan Rakyat	Total	37,350	10.05	0	0
Independents		5,796	1.56	0	0
Total		371,548	100.00	33	+6
Valid votes		371,548	97.36		
Invalid/blank votes		10,076	2.64		
Total votes		381,624	100.00		
Registered voters/turnout		522,194	73.08		
Source: Almanak Keputusan Pilihan Raya Umum: Parlimen & Dewan Undangan Negeri (1959-1999)

=== Perak ===
Party or alliance		Votes	%	Seats	+/–
Barisan Nasional	United Malays National Organisation	341,613	54.17	26	+2
Barisan Nasional	Malaysian Chinese Association	341,613	54.17	3	–7
Barisan Nasional	Malaysian Indian Congress	341,613	54.17	2	+1
Barisan Nasional	Parti Gerakan Rakyat Malaysia	341,613	54.17	1	–2
Barisan Nasional	People's Progressive Party	341,613	54.17	1	+1
Barisan Nasional	Total	341,613	54.17	33	–5
Democratic Action Party		189,096	29.98	13	+9
Harakah Keadilan Rakyat	Pan-Malaysian Islamic Party	90,210	14.30	0	0
Harakah Keadilan Rakyat	Social Democratic Party	6,400	1.01	0	0
Harakah Keadilan Rakyat	Total	96,610	15.32	0	-
Independents		3,332	0.53	0	0
Total		630,651	100.00	46	+4
Valid votes		630,651	96.88		
Invalid/blank votes		20,321	3.12		
Total votes		650,972	100.00		
Registered voters/turnout		954,180	68.22		
Source: Laporan Pilihanraya Umum Malaysia 1986

=== Perlis ===
Party or alliance		Votes	%	Seats	+/–
Barisan Nasional	United Malays National Organisation	32,817	54.17	12	+3
Barisan Nasional	Malaysian Chinese Association	6,658	10.99	2	0
Barisan Nasional	Total	39,475	65.16	14	+3
Harakah Keadilan Rakyat	Pan-Malaysian Islamic Party	20,194	33.33	0	-1
Harakah Keadilan Rakyat	Total	20,194	33.33	0	-1
Independents		912	1.51	0	0
Total		60,581	100.00	14	+2
Valid votes		60,581	96.15		
Invalid/blank votes		2,429	3.85		
Total votes		63,010	100.00		
Registered voters/turnout		85,394	73.79		

=== Sabah ===
Party	Votes	%	Seats	+/–
United Sabah Party (PBS)	166,136	53.71	34	+9
United Sabah National Organisation (Usno)	62,674	20.26	12	–4
Sabah People's United Front (Berjaya)	54,124	17.50	1	–5
Sabah Chinese Consolidated Party (SCCP)	7,602	2.46	1	New
United Pasok Nunukragang National Organisation (Pasok)	1,615	0.52	0	0
Sabah Chinese Party (SCP)	4,006	1.30	0	New
Independents	13,149	4.25	0	0
Total	309,306	100.00	48	0
Valid votes	309,306	98.96		
Invalid/blank votes	3,239	1.04		
Total votes	312,545	100.00		
Registered voters/turnout	423,097	73.87		
Source: HLSC

=== Selangor ===
Party or alliance		Votes	%	Seats	+/–
Barisan Nasional	United Malays National Organisation	301,420	62.44	26	+6
Barisan Nasional	Malaysian Chinese Association	301,420	62.44	8	+1
Barisan Nasional	Malaysian Indian Congress	301,420	62.44	3	0
Barisan Nasional	Parti Gerakan Rakyat Malaysia	301,420	62.44	0	–1
Barisan Nasional	Total	301,420	62.44	37	+6
Democratic Action Party		113,540	23.52	5	+4
Harakah Keadilan Rakyat	Pan-Malaysian Islamic Party	52,341	10.84	0	0
Harakah Keadilan Rakyat	Malaysian Nationalist Party	9,615	1.99	0	0
Harakah Keadilan Rakyat	Social Democratic Party	4,250	0.88	0	0
Harakah Keadilan Rakyat	Total	66,206	13.71	0	-
Independents		1,578	0.33	0	–1
Total		482,744	100.00	42	+9
Valid votes		482,744	97.04		
Invalid/blank votes		14,747	2.96		
Total votes		497,491	100.00		
Registered voters/turnout		720,985	69.00		
Source: Laporan Pilihanraya Umum Malaysia 1986

=== Terengganu ===
Party or alliance		Votes	%	Seats	+/–
Barisan Nasional	United Malays National Organisation	119,014	57.53	29	+7
Barisan Nasional	Malaysian Chinese Association	5,280	2.55	1	0
Barisan Nasional	Total	124,294	60.08	30	+7
Harakah Keadilan Rakyat	Pan-Malaysian Islamic Party	82,186	39.73	10	0
Harakah Keadilan Rakyat	Social Democratic Party	158	0.08	0	0
Harakah Keadilan Rakyat	Total	82,344	39.81	10	0
Independents		226	0.11	0	0
Total		206,864	100.00	40	+4
Valid votes		206,864	96.19		
Invalid/blank votes		8,194	3.81		
Total votes		215,058	100.00		
Registered voters/turnout		273,345	78.68		
Source: Almanak Keputusan Pilihan Raya Umum: Parlimen & Dewan Undangan Negeri (1959-1999)
