= Socialist Democratic Party (Malaysia) =

Socialist Democratic Party Parti Sosialis Demokratik SDP
- Leader: Yeap Ghim Guan (Founder); Fan Yew Teng (Secretary General)
- Founded: 1978
- Dissolved: 1986
- Split from: Democratic Action Party
- Headquarters: Ipoh, Malaysia
- Ideology: Social democracy
- National affiliation: Harakah Keadilan Rakyat (1986)

Socialist Democratic Party (SDP) (Malay: Parti Sosialis Demokratik) was a splinter party of Democratic Action Party (DAP) formed in 1978 by Yeap Ghim Guan. He was later joined by another former DAP MP Fan Yew Teng who had also left the party after a dispute with the leadership of Lim Kit Siang. SDP failed to win any seat in the Malaysian general election, 1986 and it finally became defunct.

== History ==
The party was based in Ipoh. The party contested the 1978 Malaysian general election but all 3 parliamentary candidates and 9 state candidates fail make the cut, including the chairman, Yeap Ghim Guan. Fan Yew Teng joined the party in 1983 in order to revive it, but with limited success.

On 1st March 1986, Ahmad Nor took over chairmanship of the party for 1986 Malaysian general election.

After a poor showing, he left the party eight months later and it soon became defunct with many members rejoining the DAP or rival party MCA.

== Leadership ==
President

| Order | Name | Term of office | | Remarks |
|---|---|---|---|---|
| 1 | Ismail Hashim | 1978 | 1986 | |
| 2 | Ahmad Nor | 1986 | 1986 | |

Secretary General

| Order | Name | Term of office | | Remarks |
|---|---|---|---|---|
| 1 | Yeap Ghim Guan | 1980 | 1983 | |
| 2 | Fan Yew Teng | 1983 | 1986 | |

== General election results ==
| Election | Total seats won | Seats contested | Total votes | Voting Percentage | Outcome of election | Election leader |
|---|---|---|---|---|---|---|
| 1978 | 0 / 154 | 3 | 13,788 | 0.40 | ; No representation in Parliament | Yeap Ghim Guan |
| 1982 | 0 / 154 | 1 | 464 | 0.01 | ; No representation in Parliament | Fan Yew Teng |
| 1986 | 0 / 177 | 18 | 44,863 | 0.97 | ; No representation in Parliament | Ahmad Nor |

=== State elections ===
| State election | State Legislative Assembly | | | | | | |
| State election | Kedah | Terengganu | Penang | Perak | Selangor | Johor | Total won / Total contested |
|---|---|---|---|---|---|---|---|
| 1978 | 0 / 26 | | 0 / 27 | | | | 0 / 9 |
| 1982 | | | 0 / 27 | | | | 0 / 2 |
| 1986 | 0 / 28 | 0 / 32 | 0 / 33 | 0 / 46 | 0 / 42 | 0 / 36 | 0 / 30 |

== See also ==
- Politics of Malaysia
- List of political parties in Malaysia
- Yeap Ghim Guan
- Fan Yew Teng
