= 1986 Malaysian general election =

- 2–3 August 1986

All 177 seats in the Dewan Rakyat 89 seats needed for a majority
- Registered: 6,791,446
- Turnout: 69.97%
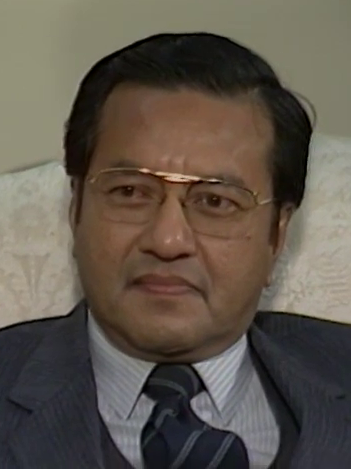

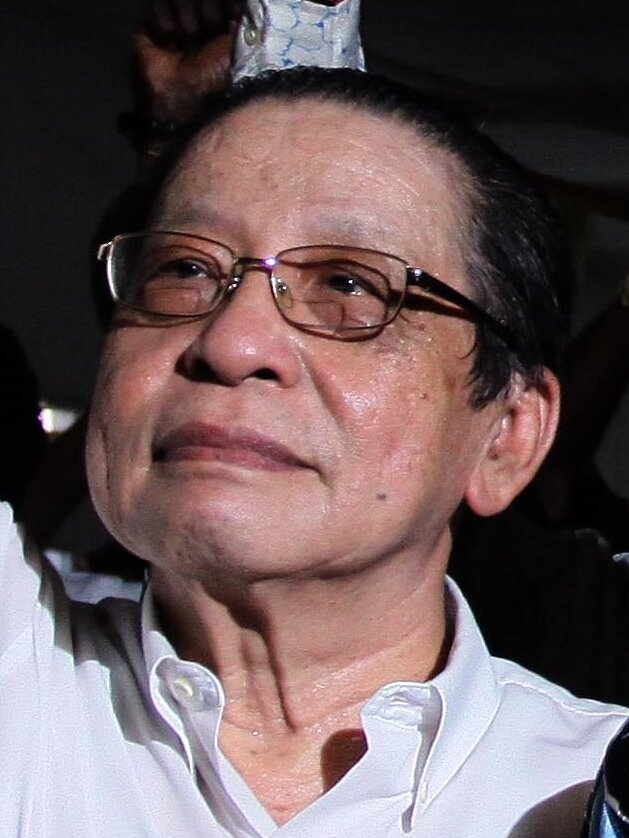

| | First party | Second party | Third party |
|---|---|---|---|
| Leader | Mahathir Mohamad | Lim Kit Siang | Yusof Rawa |
| Party | BN | DAP | PAS |
| Last election | 60.54%, 132 seats | 19.58%, 9 seats | 14.46%, 5 seats |
| Seats won | 148 | 24 | 1 |
| Seat change | ▲16 | ▲15 | ▼4 |
| Popular vote | 2,649,238 | 975,544 | 716,952 |
| Percentage | 57.28% | 21.09% | 15.50% |
| Swing | ▼3.26pp | ▲1.51pp | ▲1.04pp |
Prime Minister before election
Mahathir Mohamad
BN
Prime Minister-designate
Mahathir Mohamad
BN

General elections were held in Malaysia on 2 and 3 August 1986. Voting took place in all 177 parliamentary constituencies of Malaysia, each electing one Member of Parliament to the Dewan Rakyat, the dominant house of Parliament. State elections also took place in eleven of the thirteen states.

== Results ==
| Party or alliance | | Votes | % | Seats | +/– |
|---|---|---|---|---|---|
| Barisan Nasional | United Malays National Organisation | 1,474,069 | 31.87 | 83 | +13 |
| Barisan Nasional | Malaysian Chinese Association | 589,253 | 12.74 | 17 | –7 |
| Barisan Nasional | Parti Gerakan Rakyat Malaysia | 149,644 | 3.24 | 5 | 0 |
| Barisan Nasional | Malaysian Indian Congress | 104,706 | 2.26 | 6 | +2 |
| Barisan Nasional | Sarawak United Peoples' Party | 93,018 | 2.01 | 4 | –1 |
| Barisan Nasional | United Sabah Party | 73,786 | 1.60 | 10 | New |
| Barisan Nasional | Parti Pesaka Bumiputera Bersatu | 48,367 | 1.05 | 8 | 0 |
| Barisan Nasional | Sarawak National Party | 34,221 | 0.74 | 4 | –2 |
| Barisan Nasional | Parti Hizbul Muslimin Malaysia | 29,943 | 0.65 | 1 | New |
| Barisan Nasional | United Sabah National Organisation | 27,409 | 0.59 | 5 | +5 |
| Barisan Nasional | Parti Bansa Dayak Sarawak | 24,822 | 0.54 | 5 | New |
| Barisan Nasional | Total | 2,649,238 | 57.28 | 148 | +16 |
| Democratic Action Party | | 975,544 | 21.09 | 24 | +15 |
| Pan-Malaysian Islamic Party | | 716,952 | 15.50 | 1 | –4 |
| Parti Sosialis Rakyat Malaysia | | 59,156 | 1.28 | 0 | 0 |
| Social Democratic Party | | 45,340 | 0.98 | 0 | 0 |
| Sabah People's United Front | | 20,360 | 0.44 | 0 | 0 |
| Malaysian Nationalist Party | | 10,228 | 0.22 | 0 | New |
| Sarawak United Labour Party | | 967 | 0.02 | 0 | New |
| Sabah National Momogun Party | | 584 | 0.01 | 0 | New |
| Independents | | 146,903 | 3.18 | 4 | –4 |
| Total | | 4,625,272 | 100.00 | 177 | +23 |
| Valid votes | | 4,625,272 | 97.33 | | |
| Invalid/blank votes | | 126,734 | 2.67 | | |
| Total votes | | 4,752,006 | 100.00 | | |
| Registered voters/turnout | | 6,791,446 | 69.97 | | |
Source: Nohlen et al., IPU, Tindak Malaysia Github

Total registered voters above to total electors of contested constituencies. Total Electors of Malaysia inclusive of 6 uncontested constituencies is 6964960.

=== By state ===
==== Johor ====
| Party or alliance | | Votes | % | Seats | +/– |
|---|---|---|---|---|---|
| Barisan Nasional | United Malays National Organisation | 224,130 | 42.67 | 12 | +1 |
| Barisan Nasional | Malaysian Chinese Association | 102,489 | 19.51 | 5 | +1 |
| Barisan Nasional | Malaysian Indian Congress | 18,644 | 3.55 | 1 | 0 |
| Barisan Nasional | Total | 345,623 | 65.79 | 18 | +2 |
| Democratic Action Party | | 93,228 | 17.75 | 0 | 0 |
| Parti Sosialis Rakyat Malaysia | | 45,255 | 8.61 | 0 | 0 |
| Pan-Malaysian Islamic Party | | 28,493 | 5.42 | 0 | 0 |
| Social Democratic Party | | 7,980 | 1.52 | 0 | 0 |
| Independents | | 5,098 | 0.97 | 0 | 0 |
| Total | | 525,317 | 100.00 | 18 | +2 |
| Valid votes | | 525,317 | 95.75 | | |
| Invalid/blank votes | | 23,303 | 4.25 | | |
| Total votes | | 548,620 | 100.00 | | |
| Registered voters/turnout | | 767,930 | 71.44 | | |

Total registered voters above refers to total electorate of contested constituencies. Total Electorate for Johor including two uncontested seats is 858819

==== Kedah ====
| Party or alliance | | Votes | % | Seats | +/– |
|---|---|---|---|---|---|
| Barisan Nasional | United Malays National Organisation | 220,797 | 51.78 | 12 | +2 |
| Barisan Nasional | Malaysian Chinese Association | 35,893 | 8.42 | 2 | 0 |
| Barisan Nasional | Total | 256,690 | 60.20 | 14 | +2 |
| Pan-Malaysian Islamic Party | | 152,063 | 35.66 | 0 | –1 |
| Democratic Action Party | | 17,422 | 4.09 | 0 | 0 |
| Social Democratic Party | | 249 | 0.06 | 0 | 0 |
| Total | | 426,424 | 100.00 | 14 | +1 |
| Valid votes | | 426,424 | 97.59 | | |
| Invalid/blank votes | | 10,536 | 2.41 | | |
| Total votes | | 436,960 | 100.00 | | |
| Registered voters/turnout | | 598,594 | 73.00 | | |

==== Kelantan ====
| Party or alliance | | Votes | % | Seats | +/– |
|---|---|---|---|---|---|
| Barisan Nasional | United Malays National Organisation | 157,568 | 45.49 | 11 | +3 |
| Barisan Nasional | Parti Hizbul Muslimin Malaysia | 29,943 | 8.65 | 1 | New |
| Barisan Nasional | Total | 187,511 | 54.14 | 12 | +3 |
| Pan-Malaysian Islamic Party | | 158,835 | 45.86 | 1 | –3 |
| Total | | 346,346 | 100.00 | 13 | +1 |
| Valid votes | | 346,346 | 97.65 | | |
| Invalid/blank votes | | 8,332 | 2.35 | | |
| Total votes | | 354,678 | 100.00 | | |
| Registered voters/turnout | | 469,828 | 75.49 | | |

There was conflicting information whether HAMIM sent in one or two candidates. The above table takes the view of New Straits Times 5 August that HAMIM sent two candidates.

==== Kuala Lumpur ====
| Party or alliance | | Votes | % | Seats | +/– |
|---|---|---|---|---|---|
| Democratic Action Party | | 163,476 | 53.28 | 4 | +1 |
| Barisan Nasional | Malaysian Chinese Association | 43,699 | 14.24 | 0 | –1 |
| Barisan Nasional | United Malays National Organisation | 42,384 | 13.81 | 2 | +1 |
| Barisan Nasional | Parti Gerakan Rakyat Malaysia | 38,798 | 12.65 | 1 | +1 |
| Barisan Nasional | Total | 142,122 | 46.32 | 3 | +1 |
| Pan-Malaysian Islamic Party | | 10,458 | 3.41 | 0 | 0 |
| Social Democratic Party | | 6,589 | 2.15 | 0 | 0 |
| Malaysian Nationalist Party | | 1,405 | 0.46 | 0 | New |
| Total | | 306,809 | 100.00 | 7 | +2 |
| Valid votes | | 306,809 | 99.19 | | |
| Invalid/blank votes | | 2,492 | 0.81 | | |
| Total votes | | 309,301 | 100.00 | | |
| Registered voters/turnout | | 473,640 | 65.30 | | |

==== Labuan ====
| Party or alliance | | Votes | % | Seats |
|---|---|---|---|---|
| Barisan Nasional | United Malays National Organisation | 2,265 | 28.01 | 0 |
| Sabah People's United Front | | 597 | 7.38 | 0 |
| Independents | | 5,223 | 64.60 | 1 |
| Total | | 8,085 | 100.00 | 1 |
| Valid votes | | 8,085 | 99.04 | |
| Invalid/blank votes | | 78 | 0.96 | |
| Total votes | | 8,163 | 100.00 | |
| Registered voters/turnout | | 12,171 | 67.07 | |

==== Malacca ====
| Party or alliance | | Votes | % | Seats | +/– |
|---|---|---|---|---|---|
| Barisan Nasional | United Malays National Organisation | 65,824 | 38.21 | 3 | +1 |
| Barisan Nasional | Malaysian Chinese Association | 34,831 | 20.22 | 1 | 0 |
| Barisan Nasional | Total | 100,665 | 58.44 | 4 | +1 |
| Democratic Action Party | | 55,430 | 32.18 | 1 | 0 |
| Pan-Malaysian Islamic Party | | 16,168 | 9.39 | 0 | 0 |
| Total | | 172,253 | 100.00 | 5 | +1 |
| Valid votes | | 172,253 | 96.90 | | |
| Invalid/blank votes | | 5,508 | 3.10 | | |
| Total votes | | 177,761 | 100.00 | | |
| Registered voters/turnout | | 242,913 | 73.18 | | |

==== Negeri Sembilan ====
| Party or alliance | | Votes | % | Seats | +/– |
|---|---|---|---|---|---|
| Barisan Nasional | United Malays National Organisation | 74,156 | 35.26 | 4 | +1 |
| Barisan Nasional | Malaysian Indian Congress | 19,193 | 9.13 | 1 | 0 |
| Barisan Nasional | Malaysian Chinese Association | 42,181 | 20.05 | 0 | –2 |
| Barisan Nasional | Total | 135,530 | 64.44 | 5 | –1 |
| Democratic Action Party | | 63,807 | 30.34 | 2 | +2 |
| Pan-Malaysian Islamic Party | | 10,992 | 5.23 | 0 | 0 |
| Total | | 210,329 | 100.00 | 7 | +1 |
| Valid votes | | 210,329 | 97.12 | | |
| Invalid/blank votes | | 6,246 | 2.88 | | |
| Total votes | | 216,575 | 100.00 | | |
| Registered voters/turnout | | 298,660 | 72.52 | | |

==== Pahang ====
| Party or alliance | | Votes | % | Seats | +/– |
|---|---|---|---|---|---|
| Barisan Nasional | United Malays National Organisation | 120,774 | 45.93 | 7 | +1 |
| Barisan Nasional | Malaysian Chinese Association | 48,334 | 18.38 | 3 | +1 |
| Barisan Nasional | Total | 169,118 | 64.31 | 10 | +2 |
| Pan-Malaysian Islamic Party | | 60,236 | 22.91 | 0 | 0 |
| Democratic Action Party | | 33,632 | 12.79 | 0 | 0 |
| Total | | 262,976 | 100.00 | 10 | +2 |
| Valid votes | | 262,976 | 97.09 | | |
| Invalid/blank votes | | 7,893 | 2.91 | | |
| Total votes | | 270,869 | 100.00 | | |
| Registered voters/turnout | | 380,979 | 71.10 | | |

==== Penang ====
| Party or alliance | | Votes | % | Seats | +/– |
|---|---|---|---|---|---|
| Barisan Nasional | United Malays National Organisation | 66,746 | 17.96 | 4 | +1 |
| Barisan Nasional | Parti Gerakan Rakyat Malaysia | 62,799 | 16.90 | 1 | –1 |
| Barisan Nasional | Malaysian Chinese Association | 54,179 | 14.58 | 0 | –2 |
| Barisan Nasional | Total | 183,724 | 49.44 | 5 | –2 |
| Democratic Action Party | | 147,641 | 39.73 | 6 | +4 |
| Pan-Malaysian Islamic Party | | 24,053 | 6.47 | 0 | 0 |
| Parti Sosialis Rakyat Malaysia | | 13,901 | 3.74 | 0 | 0 |
| Malaysian Nationalist Party | | 1,219 | 0.33 | 0 | New |
| Social Democratic Party | | 1,075 | 0.29 | 0 | New |
| Total | | 371,613 | 100.00 | 11 | +2 |
| Valid votes | | 371,613 | 97.51 | | |
| Invalid/blank votes | | 9,503 | 2.49 | | |
| Total votes | | 381,116 | 100.00 | | |
| Registered voters/turnout | | 522,194 | 72.98 | | |

==== Perak ====
| Party or alliance | | Votes | % | Seats | +/– |
|---|---|---|---|---|---|
| Barisan Nasional | United Malays National Organisation | 173,158 | 27.40 | 11 | 0 |
| Barisan Nasional | Malaysian Chinese Association | 101,962 | 16.14 | 3 | –3 |
| Barisan Nasional | Parti Gerakan Rakyat Malaysia | 48,047 | 7.60 | 3 | 0 |
| Barisan Nasional | Malaysian Indian Congress | 26,730 | 4.23 | 2 | +1 |
| Barisan Nasional | Total | 349,897 | 55.37 | 19 | –2 |
| Democratic Action Party | | 181,561 | 28.73 | 4 | +4 |
| Pan-Malaysian Islamic Party | | 94,585 | 14.97 | 0 | 0 |
| Social Democratic Party | | 5,883 | 0.93 | 0 | 0 |
| Total | | 631,926 | 100.00 | 23 | +2 |
| Valid votes | | 631,926 | 97.12 | | |
| Invalid/blank votes | | 18,757 | 2.88 | | |
| Total votes | | 650,683 | 100.00 | | |
| Registered voters/turnout | | 954,180 | 68.19 | | |

==== Perlis ====
| Party or alliance | | Votes | % | Seats | +/– |
|---|---|---|---|---|---|
| Barisan Nasional | United Malays National Organisation | 40,619 | 66.47 | 2 | 0 |
| Pan-Malaysian Islamic Party | | 20,488 | 33.53 | 0 | 0 |
| Total | | 61,107 | 100.00 | 2 | 0 |
| Valid votes | | 61,107 | 97.51 | | |
| Invalid/blank votes | | 1,560 | 2.49 | | |
| Total votes | | 62,667 | 100.00 | | |
| Registered voters/turnout | | 85,394 | 73.39 | | |

==== Sabah ====
| Party or alliance | | Votes | % | Seats | +/– |
|---|---|---|---|---|---|
| Barisan Nasional | United Sabah National Organisation | 27,409 | 12.84 | 8 | +8 |
| Barisan Nasional | United Sabah Party | 73,786 | 34.57 | 7 | New |
| Barisan Nasional | Total | 101,195 | 47.42 | 15 | +8 |
| Democratic Action Party | | 41,392 | 19.40 | 4 | +3 |
| Sabah People's United Front | | 19,763 | 9.26 | 0 | 0 |
| Pan-Malaysian Islamic Party | | 8,346 | 3.91 | 0 | 0 |
| Sabah National Momogun Party | | 584 | 0.27 | 0 | New |
| Independents | | 42,132 | 19.74 | 1 | –4 |
| Total | | 213,412 | 100.00 | 20 | +4 |
| Valid votes | | 213,412 | 98.92 | | |
| Invalid/blank votes | | 2,323 | 1.08 | | |
| Total votes | | 215,735 | 100.00 | | |
| Registered voters/turnout | | 390,709 | 55.22 | | |

Total registered voters above refer to total electorate of contested constituencies. Total Electorate of whole of Sabah including two uncontested constituencies is 423097.

==== Sarawak ====
| Party or alliance | | Votes | % | Seats | +/– |
|---|---|---|---|---|---|
| Barisan Nasional | Sarawak United Peoples' Party | 93,018 | 25.55 | 4 | –1 |
| Barisan Nasional | Parti Pesaka Bumiputera Bersatu | 48,367 | 13.29 | 8 | 0 |
| Barisan Nasional | Sarawak National Party | 34,221 | 9.40 | 5 | –1 |
| Barisan Nasional | Parti Bansa Dayak Sarawak | 24,822 | 6.82 | 4 | New |
| Barisan Nasional | Total | 200,428 | 55.06 | 21 | –2 |
| Democratic Action Party | | 68,197 | 18.73 | 1 | –1 |
| Sarawak United Labour Party | | 967 | 0.27 | 0 | New |
| Independents | | 94,450 | 25.94 | 2 | –1 |
| Total | | 364,042 | 100.00 | 24 | 0 |
| Valid votes | | 364,042 | 97.98 | | |
| Invalid/blank votes | | 7,491 | 2.02 | | |
| Total votes | | 371,533 | 100.00 | | |
| Registered voters/turnout | | 556,995 | 66.70 | | |

Total registered voters above refer to total electorate of contested constituencies. Total electorate for whole of Sarawak including two uncontested constituencies is 607232.

==== Selangor ====
| Party or alliance | | Votes | % | Seats | +/– |
|---|---|---|---|---|---|
| Barisan Nasional | United Malays National Organisation | 159,757 | 30.99 | 7 | +1 |
| Barisan Nasional | Malaysian Chinese Association | 125,675 | 24.38 | 3 | –1 |
| Barisan Nasional | Malaysian Indian Congress | 40,139 | 7.79 | 2 | +1 |
| Barisan Nasional | Total | 325,571 | 63.16 | 12 | +1 |
| Democratic Action Party | | 109,758 | 21.29 | 2 | +2 |
| Pan-Malaysian Islamic Party | | 48,972 | 9.50 | 0 | 0 |
| Social Democratic Party | | 23,564 | 4.57 | 0 | 0 |
| Malaysian Nationalist Party | | 7,604 | 1.48 | 0 | New |
| Total | | 515,469 | 100.00 | 14 | +3 |
| Valid votes | | 515,469 | 96.84 | | |
| Invalid/blank votes | | 16,843 | 3.16 | | |
| Total votes | | 532,312 | 100.00 | | |
| Registered voters/turnout | | 763,914 | 69.68 | | |

==== Terengganu ====
| Party or alliance | | Votes | % | Seats | +/– |
|---|---|---|---|---|---|
| Barisan Nasional | United Malays National Organisation | 125,891 | 60.19 | 8 | +1 |
| Pan-Malaysian Islamic Party | | 83,263 | 39.81 | 0 | 0 |
| Total | | 209,154 | 100.00 | 8 | +1 |
| Valid votes | | 209,154 | 97.27 | | |
| Invalid/blank votes | | 5,867 | 2.73 | | |
| Total votes | | 215,021 | 100.00 | | |
| Registered voters/turnout | | 273,345 | 78.66 | | |

== See also ==
- Members of the Dewan Rakyat, 7th Malaysian Parliament
- 1986 Malaysian state elections
- First premiership of Mahathir Mohamad
