= Members of the Malaysian Parliament who represented multiple states =

This is a list of Members of the Malaysian Parliament who represented multiple states during their federal parliamentary career.

Most people in the list represented different states in the Dewan Rakyat. Nobody has ever represented different states in the Dewan Negara, although various attempts have been made.

This list includes MPs who served in the past and who continue to serve in the present.

== Members of the Malaysian Parliament who represented multiple states ==
Party	Name	State	House	Constituency	Year elected	Year left	Reason	Highest office held	Refs
Alliance (UMNO)	Bahaman Samsudin	PRK	DR	Telok Anson	1955	1959	Transferred	Cabinet Minister	
BN (UMNO)	Bahaman Samsudin	NSE	DR	Kuala Pilah	1959	1969	Not Contested	Cabinet Minister	
PMIP	Hassan Adli Mohd Arshad	TER	DR	Kuala Trengganu Utara	1959	1964	Defeated	Cabinet Minister	
BN (UMNO)	Hassan Adli Mohd Arshad	PRK	DR	Bagan Datok	1974	1982	Retired	Cabinet Minister	
Socialist Front (Labour)	V. David	SEL	DR	Bangsar	1959	1964	Defeated	MP	
Gerakan	V. David	PEN	DR	Dato' Kramat	1971	1974	Defeated	MP	
DAP	V. David	KUL	DR	Damansara	1978	1982	Defeated	MP	
DAP	V. David	SEL	DR	Puchong	1986	1995	Not Contested	MP	
DAP	Lim Kit Siang	MEL	DR	Bandar Malacca	1971	1974	Transferred	4th, 7th & 10th Leader of the Opposition	
DAP	Lim Kit Siang	MEL	DR	Kota Melaka	1974	1978	Transferred	4th, 7th & 10th Leader of the Opposition	
DAP	Lim Kit Siang	SEL	DR	Petaling	1978	1982	Transferred	4th, 7th & 10th Leader of the Opposition	
DAP	Lim Kit Siang	MEL	DR	Kota Melaka	1982	1986	Transferred	4th, 7th & 10th Leader of the Opposition	
DAP	Lim Kit Siang	PEN	DR	Tanjong	1986	1999	Defeated	4th, 7th & 10th Leader of the Opposition	
DAP	Lim Kit Siang	PRK	DR	Ipoh Timor	2004	2013	Transferred	4th, 7th & 10th Leader of the Opposition	
DAP	Lim Kit Siang	JOH	DR	Gelang Patah	2013	2018	Transferred	4th, 7th & 10th Leader of the Opposition	
PH (DAP)	Lim Kit Siang	JOH	DR	Iskandar Puteri	2018	2022	Retired	4th, 7th & 10th Leader of the Opposition	
Alliance (MCA)	Lee San Choon	JOH	DR	Segamat Selatan	1964	1974	Transferred	Cabinet Minister	
BN (MCA)	Lee San Choon	JOH	DR	Segamat	1974	1982	Transferred	Cabinet Minister	
BN (MCA)	Lee San Choon	NSE	DR	Seremban	1982	1983	Resigned	Cabinet Minister	
BN (MIC)	Subramaniam Sinniah	KUL	DR	Damansara	1974	1978	Defeated	Deputy Minister	
BN (MIC)	Subramaniam Sinniah	At-large	DN	Appointed by the Yang di-Pertuan Agong	1979	1982	Resigned	Deputy Minister	
BN (MIC)	Subramaniam Sinniah	JOH	DR	Segamat	1982	2004	Not Contested	Deputy Minister	
BN (UMNO)	Rafidah Aziz	At-large	DN	Appointed by the Yang di-Pertuan Agong	1975	1978	Resigned	Cabinet Minister	
BN (UMNO)	Rafidah Aziz	SEL	DR	Selayang	1978	1982	Transferred	Cabinet Minister	
BN (UMNO)	Rafidah Aziz	PRK	DR	Kuala Kangsar	1982	2013	Not Contested	Cabinet Minister	
BN (MCA)	Tan Koon Swan	PAH	DR	Raub	1978	1982	Transferred	MP	
BN (MCA)	Tan Koon Swan	KUL	DR	Damansara	1982	1986	Transferred	MP	
BN (MCA)	Tan Koon Swan	PRK	DR	Gopeng	1986	1990	Disqualified	MP	
BN (MCA)	Ling Liong Sik	PEN	DR	Mata Kuching	1974	1986	Transferred	Cabinet Minister	
BN (MCA)	Ling Liong Sik	JOH	DR	Labis	1986	2004	Not Contested	Cabinet Minister	
BN (MCA)	Ling Chooi Sieng	JOH	DR	Kluang	1986	1990	Transferred	MP	
BN (MCA)	Ling Chooi Sieng	PRK	DR	Lumut	1990	1995	Not Contested	MP	
BN (MCA)	Chan Kong Choy	PAH	DR	Lipis	1990	1995	Transferred	Cabinet Minister	
BN (MCA)	Chan Kong Choy	SEL	DR	Selayang	1995	2008	Not Contested	Cabinet Minister	
DAP	Fong Kui Lun	SEL	DR	Klang	1990	1995	Defeated	MP	
DAP	Fong Kui Lun	KUL	DR	Bukit Bintang	1999		Serving	MP	
PAS	Mohamad Sabu	KEL	DR	Nilam Puri	1990	1995	Transferred	Cabinet Minister	
PAS	Mohamad Sabu	KEL	DR	Kubang Kerian	1995	1999	Transferred	Cabinet Minister	
PAS	Mohamad Sabu	KED	DR	Kuala Kedah	1999	2004	Defeated	Cabinet Minister	
PH (AMANAH)	Mohamad Sabu	SEL	DR	Kota Raja	2018		Serving	Cabinet Minister	
BN (GERAKAN)	Kerk Choo Ting	PRK	DR	Taiping	1990	2004	Transferred	Deputy Minister	
BN (GERAKAN)	Kerk Choo Ting	JOH	DR	Simpang Renggam	2004	2008	Not Contested	Deputy Minister	
DAP	Lim Guan Eng	MEL	DR	Kota Melaka	1986	1999	Disqualified	Cabinet Minister	
DAP	Lim Guan Eng	PEN	DR	Bagan	2008		Serving	Cabinet Minister	
BN (MIC)	Palanivel Govindasamy	SEL	DR	Hulu Selangor	1990	2008	Defeated	Cabinet Minister	
BN (MIC)	Palanivel Govindasamy	At-large	DN	Appointed by the Yang di-Pertuan Agong	2010	2013	Resigned	Cabinet Minister	
BN (MIC)	Palanivel Govindasamy	PAH	DR	Cameron Highlands	2013	2018	Not Contested	Cabinet Minister	
DAP	Liew Chin Tong	PEN	DR	Bukit Bendera	2008	2013	Transferred	Deputy Minister	
DAP	Liew Chin Tong	JOH	DR	Kluang	2013	2018	Transferred and defeated	Deputy Minister	
PH (DAP)	Liew Chin Tong	At-large	DN	Appointed by the Yang di-Pertuan Agong	2018	2021	Not be reappointed	Deputy Minister	
PH (DAP)	Liew Chin Tong	JOH	DR	Iskandar Puteri	2022		Serving	Deputy Minister	
DAP	Teo Nie Ching	SEL	DR	Serdang	2008	2013	Transferred	Deputy Minister	
DAP	Teo Nie Ching	JOH	DR	Kulai	2013		Serving	Deputy Minister	
PAS	Kamarudin Jaffar	KEL	DR	Tumpat	1999	2018	Transferred	Deputy Minister	
PH (PKR)	Kamarudin Jaffar	KUL	DR	Bandar Tun Razak	2018	2022	Defeated	Deputy Minister	
PKR	Wan Azizah Wan Ismail	PEN	DR	Permatang Pauh	1999	2008	Resigned	12th Deputy Prime Minister of Malaysia	
PKR	Wan Azizah Wan Ismail	PEN	DR	Permatang Pauh	2015	2018	Transferred	12th Deputy Prime Minister of Malaysia	
PH (PKR)	Wan Azizah Wan Ismail	SEL	DR	Pandan	2018	2022	Transferred	12th Deputy Prime Minister of Malaysia	
PH (PKR)	Wan Azizah Wan Ismail	KUL	DR	Bandar Tun Razak	2022		Serving	12th Deputy Prime Minister of Malaysia	
PAS	Salahuddin Ayub	KEL	DR	Kubang Kerian	2004	2013	Defeated	Cabinet Minister	
PH (AMANAH)	Salahuddin Ayub	JOH	DR	Pulai	2018	2023	Death in office	Cabinet Minister	
PAS	Mohd Hatta Md Ramli	KEL	DR	Kuala Krai	2008	2018	Transferred	Deputy Minister	
PH (AMANAH)	Mohd Hatta Md Ramli	PRK	DR	Lumut	2018	2022	Defeated	Deputy Minister	
PH (AMANAH)	Mohd Hatta Md Ramli	At-large	DN	Appointed by the Yang di-Pertuan Agong	2023		Serving	Deputy Minister	
PKR	Saifuddin Nasution Ismail	KEL	DR	Machang	2008	2013	Defeated	Cabinet Minister	
PH (PKR)	Saifuddin Nasution Ismail	KED	DR	Kulim-Bandar Baharu	2018	2022	Defeated	Cabinet Minister	
PH (PKR)	Saifuddin Nasution Ismail	At-large	DN	Appointed by the Yang di-Pertuan Agong	2022		Serving	Cabinet Minister	
PKR	Nurul Izzah Anwar	KUL	DR	Lembah Pantai	2008	2018	Transferred	MP	
PH (PKR)	Nurul Izzah Anwar	PEN	DR	Permatang Pauh	2018	2022	Defeated	MP	
BN (UMNO)	Anwar Ibrahim	PEN	DR	Permatang Pauh	1982	1999	Disqualified	10th Prime Minister of Malaysia	
PKR	Anwar Ibrahim	PEN	DR	Permatang Pauh	2008	2015	Disqualified	10th Prime Minister of Malaysia	
PH (PKR)	Anwar Ibrahim	NSE	DR	Port Dickson	2018	2022	Transferred	10th Prime Minister of Malaysia	
PH (PKR)	Anwar Ibrahim	PRK	DR	Tambun	2022		Serving	10th Prime Minister of Malaysia	
PH (DAP)	Yeo Bee Yin	JOH	DR	Bakri	2018	2022	Transferred	Cabinet Minister	
PH (DAP)	Yeo Bee Yin	SEL	DR	Puchong	2022		Serving	Cabinet Minister	
