= Deputy Minister of Federal Territories =

Malaysian government deputy minister

- تيمبالن منتري ولايه ڤرسكوتوان; Timbalan Menteri Wilayah Persekutuan
- Ministry of Federal Territories
- Style: Yang Berhormat
- Status: abolished
- Member of: Cabinet of Malaysia
- Reports to: Prime Minister; Minister of Federal Territories
- Seat: Putrajaya
- Appointer: Yang di-Pertuan Agong; on the advice of Prime Minister
- Formation: 1978
- First holder: Subramaniam Sinniah
- Final holder: Jalaluddin Alias
- Abolished: 2022
- Website: www.kwp.gov.my

The Deputy Minister of Federal Territories (Malay: Timbalan Menteri Wilayah Persekutuan; Chinese: 联邦直辖区部副部长; Tamil: மத்திய பிரதேசங்களின் துணை அமைச்சர்) is a defunct Malaysian cabinet position serving as deputy head of the Ministry of Federal Territories.

== List of Deputy Ministers of Federal Territories ==
The following individuals have been appointed as Deputy Minister of Federal Territories, or any of its precedent titles:

Colour key (for political coalition/parties):

Coalition	Component party	Timeline
Barisan Nasional (BN)	United Malays National Organisation (UMNO)	1973–present
Barisan Nasional (BN)	Sabah People's United Front (BERJAYA)	
Barisan Nasional (BN)	Malaysian Indian Congress (MIC)	1973–present
Barisan Nasional (BN)	People's Progressive Party (myPPP)	
Pakatan Harapan (PH)	Malaysian United Indigenous Party (BERSATU)	2015–2020
Perikatan Nasional (PN)	Malaysian United Indigenous Party (BERSATU)	2020–present

=== Deputy Minister of Local Government and Federal Territories ===
Portrait	Name (Birth–Death) Constituency	Political coalition	Political party	Took office	Left office	Prime Minister (Cabinet)
	Subramaniam Sinniah (1944–2022); MP for Damansara	BN	MIC	1 January 1978	1978	Hussein Onn (I)
Post renamed into Deputy Minister of Federal Territories
=== Deputy Minister of Federal Territories ===
Portrait	Name (Birth–Death) Constituency	Political coalition	Political party	Took office	Left office	Prime Minister (Cabinet)
	Abdullah Ahmad Badawi (b.1939); MP for Kepala Batas	BN	UMNO	1980	1981	Hussein Onn (II)
	Idris Abdul Rauf (b.?); MP for Parit Buntar	BN	UMNO	17 July 1981	30 April 1982	Mahathir Mohamad (I)
	Muhyiddin Yassin (b.1947); MP for Pagoh	BN	UMNO	30 April 1982	1 June 1983	Mahathir Mohamad (II)
	Ahmad Shah Hussein Tambakau (b.?); MP for Keningau	BN	BERJAYA	2 June 1983	10 August 1986	Mahathir Mohamad (II)
	Zulhasnan Rafique (b.1954); MP for Setiawangsa	BN	UMNO	27 March 2004	14 February 2006	Abdullah Ahmad Badawi (II)
	Abu Seman Yusop (b.1944); MP for Masjid Tanah	BN	UMNO	14 February 2006	18 March 2008	Abdullah Ahmad Badawi (II)
	Saravanan Murugan (b.1968); MP for Tapah	BN	MIC	19 March 2008	9 April 2009	Abdullah Ahmad Badawi (III)
	Loga Bala Mohan Jaganathan (b.?); Senator	BN	myPPP	16 May 2013	9 May 2018	Najib Razak (II)
	Shahruddin Md Salleh (b.1956); MP for Sri Gading	PH	BERSATU	2 July 2018	24 February 2020	Mahathir Mohamad (VII)
	Edmund Santhara Kumar Ramanaidu (b.1971); MP for Segamat	PN	BERSATU	10 March 2020	16 August 2021	Muhyiddin Yassin (I)
	Jalaluddin Alias (b.1953); MP for Jelebu	BN	UMNO	30 August 2021	24 November 2022	Ismail Sabri Yaakob (I)
Post renamed into Deputy Minister of Federal Territories and Urban Wellbeing
=== Deputy Minister of Federal Territories and Urban Wellbeing ===
Portrait	Name (Birth–Death) Constituency	Political coalition	Political party	Took office	Left office	Prime Minister (Cabinet)
	Saravanan Murugan (b.1968); MP for Tapah	BN	MIC	10 April 2009	15 May 2013	Najib Razak (I)
