= Fan Yew Teng =

Malaysian activist and politician

- 范俊登

Member of the Malaysian Parliament for Menglembu
- In office 1974–1978
- Preceded by: S. P. Seenivasagam (PPP)
- Succeeded by: Patto Perumal (DAP)

Member of the Malaysian Parliament for Petaling Jaya
- In office 1974–1978
- Preceded by: Constituency established
- Succeeded by: Constituency abolished

Member of the Malaysian Parliament for Kampar
- In office 1971–1974
- Preceded by: Parliament suspended (1969–1971); Toh Theam Hock (1964–1969)
- Succeeded by: Constituency abolished

Personal details
- Born: 12 May 1942 Kampar, Perak, British Malaya
- Died: 7 December 2010 (aged 68) Bangkok, Thailand
- Spouse: Noeleen Heyzer
- Children: 2
- Education: CertEd, University of Birmingham via MTT College, 1962; DipEd, University of London, 1980; MAEd, University of Sussex, 1981
- Occupation: Human rights activist; educator; trade unionist; politician; writer

Fan Yew Teng (Chinese: 范俊登, Tamil: பான் இயூ தெங், romanized: Pāṉ Iyū Teṅ; 12 May 1942 – 7 December 2010) was a Malaysian human rights activist, educator, trade unionist, politician, and writer. He served as the Acting Secretary-General of the Democratic Action Party (DAP), a Member of the Parliament of Malaysia for Kampar and Menglembu, and an Assemblyman in the Selangor State Legislative Assembly for Petaling Jaya.

== Early life and education ==
Fan was born to Malaysian Chinese parents on 12 May 1942 in Kampar, Perak on the west coast of the Malay Peninsula. He was the eldest of nine children.

He received a Certificate in Education (CertEd) from the University of Birmingham in 1962, after attending and graduating from the Malayan Teacher Training College in Featherstone, near Wolverhampton, England, United Kingdom. Following his certification, Fan returned to the Federation of Malaya – which would become the modern state of Malaysia the following year, in 1963 – and began teaching in Kuala Lumpur.

He became active in the National Union of Teachers (NUT; reconfigured as the National Union of the Teaching Profession (NUTP) in 1974) and, due to his involvement in the NUT, he was sent off from Kuala Lumpur to teach at schools in rural areas, including Kuala Lipis and Temerloh in Pahang and Tanah Merah in Kelantan. He was a co-organiser of the 1967 nationwide teachers' strike, which helped to bring about equal pay for women, as well as pension, housing, and health benefits for all teachers. In 1967, he was appointed as the editor of the NUTP's official organ, The Educator. Under his editorship, The Educator became focused on raising issues and awareness, not just among teachers but also the general public, about the challenges experienced by teachers in Malaysia and elsewhere around the world. In addition to staunch and often sharp criticism against the government, the publication included articles from prominent scholars and educators to refresh and improve the knowledge of teachers and featured a column called "Issues in Parliament," which kept teachers up-to-date on pertinent debates raised in Parliament.

During the 1976–77 academic year, he was a Parvin Fellow at the Woodrow Wilson School of Public Policy and International Affairs at Princeton University. He received a Diploma in Education (DipEd) from the University of London in 1980 and a Master of Arts in Education (MAEd) from the University of Sussex in 1981.

== Political career ==
He contested and won on a Democratic Action Party (DAP) ticket in Kampar, Perak in the 1969 general election. In the 1974 general election, Fan took on PPP founding president S. P. Seenivasagam in Menglembu parliamentary seat as well as unionist and former MTUC secretary-general V. David in the Petaling Jaya state seat. Fan won both seats and came to be known as a 'giant slayer'. Fan was also famed for his firebrand oratory style.

Fan's political career was marred by many trials and tribulations, including his infamous conviction under the Sedition Act in 1975 and subsequent disqualification from the Menglembu parliamentary seat. Fan was disqualified after he was fined RM2,000 in default six months’ jail for publishing a "seditious" speech by the then Penang DAP chairman Dr Ooi Kee Siak the in party organ The Rocket. A two-term MP, he was denied the right to an MP pension. To make ends meet, Fan became a freelance writer and would occasionally conduct lectures for students.

He was arrested in 1969 and later charged under the Sedition Act 1948 for publishing, as editor of DAP's The Rocket, a speech by Dr. Ooi Kee Saik, then Penang DAP Chairman. He was eventually convicted for sedition in 1975. Fan was then disqualified from Parliament and denied all MP privileges, including his pension. He kept his parliamentary seat until 1977, when the Privy Council upheld the decision of the High Court. Fan left DAP over differences in 1978 to form the Socialist Democratic Party (SDP). He rejoined the DAP in 1998, during the transformative period of Reformasi in Malaysia.

== Personal life and death ==
Fan lived in the city of Ipoh, Malaysia, Living out the final days of his life close to his wife, Dr. Noeleen Heyzer and twin daughters in Bangkok. Fan died after a year-long battle with cancer at 1:40pm on 7 December 2010 at the Bumrungrad International Hospital in Bangkok.

== Election results ==
Parliament of Malaysia
Year	Constituency	Candidate	Votes	Pct	Opponent(s)	Votes	Pct	Ballots cast	Majority	Turnout
1969	P054 Kampar	Fan Yew Teng (DAP)	17,532	59.95%	Liew Why Hone (MCA)	8,827	30.19%	30,712	8,705	75.78%
1969	P054 Kampar	Fan Yew Teng (DAP)	17,532	59.95%	Abdul Kadir Sohor (PMIP)	2,884	9.86%	30,712	8,705	75.78%
1974	P055 Menglembu	Fan Yew Teng (DAP)	22,505	62.53%	S. P. Seenivasagam (PPP)	11,757	32.66%	36,997	10,748	75.45%
1974	P055 Menglembu	Fan Yew Teng (DAP)	22,505	62.53%	Koo Eng Kuang (IND)	1,731	4.81%	36,997	10,748	75.45%
1986	P065 Kampar	Fan Yew Teng (SDP)	1,636	5.89%	Ngoi Thiam Woh (DAP)	14,606	52.60%	28,424	3,081	68.70%
1986	P065 Kampar	Fan Yew Teng (SDP)	1,636	5.89%	Chin Fook Nyaan (MCA)	11,525	41.51%	28,424	3,081	68.70%

Selangor State Legislative Assembly
Year	Constituency	Candidate	Votes	Pct	Opponent(s)	Votes	Pct	Ballots cast	Majority	Turnout
1974	N25 Petaling Jaya	Fan Yew Teng (DAP)	8,597	43.24%	Chan Jee Swee (GERAKAN)	6,067	30.51%	20,248	2,530	74.85%
1974	N25 Petaling Jaya	Fan Yew Teng (DAP)	8,597	43.24%	V. David (PEKEMAS)	5,219	26.25%	20,248	2,530	74.85%

Perak State Legislative Assembly
Year	Constituency	Candidate	Votes	Pct	Opponent(s)	Votes	Pct	Ballots cast	Majority	Turnout
1986	N16 Jalong	Fan Yew Teng (SDP)	368		Tai Chee Chai	4,580		14,446	1,761	73.87%
1986	N16 Jalong	Fan Yew Teng (SDP)	368		Liew Sam Fong (DAP)	6,341		14,446	1,761	73.87%
1986	N16 Jalong	Fan Yew Teng (SDP)	368		Lim Ah Guan (IND)			14,446	1,761	73.87%
1999	N23 Tebing Tinggi	Fan Yew Teng (DAP)	5,642	45.01%	Chew Wai Khoon (MCA)	6,894	54.99%	12,726	1,252	61.71%

== Published works ==
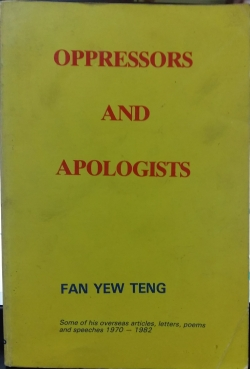
Oppressors and Apologists was banned when first published in 1988

Throughout his life, he continued to write prolifically on political and social issues and campaign for human rights and the cause of justice. His books include 'If We Love This Country' (1988), 'Oppressors and Apologists' (1988), 'The UMNO Drama: Power Struggles in Malaysia' (1989), 'The Rape of Law' (1990), and 'Anwar Saga: Malaysia on Trial' (1999). He also co-authored, with A. Rajaguru, 'The Neverending Quest: The teachers' struggle for dignity and excellence' (1994).
