= Ipoh-Menglembu (Federal Legislative Council constituency) =

Perak constituency

Defunct federal constituency
- Legislature: Dewan Rakyat
- Constituency created: 1955
- Constituency abolished: 1959
- First contested: 1955
- Last contested: 1957

Ipoh-Menglembu was a federal constituency in Perak, Malaysia, that has been represented in the Federal Legislative Council from 1955 to 1959.

The federal constituency was created in the 1955 redistribution and is mandated to return a single member to the Federal Legislative Council under the first past the post voting system.

== History ==
It was abolished in 1959 when it was redistributed.

=== Representation history ===
Members of Parliament for Ipoh-Menglembu
Parliament	Years	Member	Party	Vote Share
Constituency created
1st	1955-1957	Leong Yew Koh (梁宇皋)	Alliance (MCA)	7,421; 76.92%
1st	1957-1959	Darma Raja Seenivasagam (தார்ம ராஜா சீனிவசகம்)	PPP	5,911; 59.09%
Constituency abolished, split into Ipoh and Menglembu

=== State constituency ===
Parliamentary constituency	State constituency						
Parliamentary constituency	1955–59*	1959–1974	1974–1986	1986–1995	1995–2004	2004–2018	2018–present
Ipoh-Menglembu	Ipoh North						
Ipoh-Menglembu	Ipoh South						

== Election results ==
Malaysian general by-election, 23 November 1957 Upon the resignation of incumbent, Leong Yew Koh
Party	Candidate	Votes	%	∆%
PPP	D. R. Seenivasagam	5,911	59.09	▲50.72
Alliance	Yap Yin Fah	4,091	40.91	▼36.01
Total valid votes		10,002		
Total rejected ballots		114		
Unreturned ballots				
Turnout		10,116	62.50	▼20.20
Registered electors		16,013		
Majority		1,820	18.18	▼48.55
PPP gain from Alliance		Swing		?

Malayan general election, 1955: Ipoh-Menglembu
Party	Candidate	Votes	%
Alliance	Leong Yew Koh	7,421	76.92
National Association of Perak	Loh Ah Kee	983	10.19
PPP	D. R. Seenivasagam	808	8.37
Independent	W. E. Balasingam	439	4.55
Total valid votes		9,651	100.00
Total rejected ballots			
Unreturned ballots			
Turnout		9,651	82.70
Registered electors		11,610	
Majority		6,438	66.73
This was a new constituency created.
Source(s): The Straits Times.
