= Goh Hock Guan =

Malaysian politician

- 吴福源
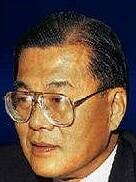

2nd Secretary-General of DAP
- In office 1966–1969
- Preceded by: Devan Nair
- Succeeded by: Lim Kit Siang

Member of Parliament for Bangsar, Selangor
- In office 1969–1974
- Preceded by: Devan Nair
- Succeeded by: Constituency abolished

Personal details
- Born: 9 September 1935 Kedah, Sultanate of Kedah (now Malaysia)
- Died: 29 March 2018 (aged 82)
- Party: People's Action Party of Malaya (1964–1965); Democratic Action Party (1966–1973); Parti Gerakan Rakyat Malaysia / Barisan Nasional (1974)
- Children: Dr Goh Poh Sun; Goh Li Lin
- Occupation: Architect

Goh Hock Guan (Chinese: 吴福源) (9 September 1935 – 29 March 2018) was a Malaysian politician from Democratic Action Party (DAP) and Parti Gerakan Rakyat Malaysia (GERAKAN). He was the founder of the internationally acclaimed architectural firm Goh Hock Guan and Associates.

== Political career ==
He began his career with the Malayan chapter of the People's Action Party during the Singapore-Malaysia years. In the Malaysian General Election, 1964 he contested the Pantai state seat and lost his deposit.

He became one of the founding members of the Democratic Action Party after the separation where the PAP was deregistered, and was the DAP logo designer. He started off as Vice-Chairman and was elected as Secretary-General of the DAP after the resignation of then Secretary-General Devan Nair. He led the DAP in Malaysian General Election, 1969. The party won 13 parliamentary seats including his own win in Bangsar that incumbent DAP MP Nair had given up to him to return to Singapore.

He quit the DAP after falling out with his erstwhile deputy Lim Kit Siang and joined the Parti Gerakan Rakyat Malaysia in 1974, which was a component party in the Barisan Nasional coalition. When Bangsar was carved into Petaling and Damansara, Goh contested Petaling as a BN candidate, but lost to the DAP. Goh quit politics thereafter.

== Achievements ==
Goh, who was also chairman and founder of Akitek Jururancang (Malaysia) Sdn Bhd, was responsible for building the iconic revolving restaurant at the Federal Hotel, which he designed to celebrate the country's independence in 1957.

His other designs include Mid Valley Megamall and Sunway Pyramid, and he did the town planning for major projects such as Subang Jaya, Putrajaya and the Kuala Lumpur International Airport.

== Relationships with other leaders ==
He has friendships with political heavyweights such as Singapore's late founding father Lee Kuan Yew. Goh reportedly had the ear of former prime minister Tun Abdul Razak Hussein and was once courted to join Barisan Nasional, as they both believed in a multi-racial approach to politics.

== Personal life ==
Goh died on 29 March 2018 at the age of 82. He was cremated at Xiao En Crematorium in Nilai, Negri Sembilan.

== Election results ==
Selangor State Legislative Assembly
Year	Constituency	Candidate	Votes	Pct	Opponent(s)	Votes	Pct	Ballots cast	Majority	Turnout
1964	N13 Pantai	Goh Hock Guan (PAP)	3,958	25.78%	V. David (LPM)	5,701	37.14%	15,725	360	68.26%
1964	N13 Pantai	Goh Hock Guan (PAP)	3,958	25.78%	Seow Yu Boon (MCA)	5,341	34.79%	15,725	360	68.26%
1964	N13 Pantai	Goh Hock Guan (PAP)	3,958	25.78%	Cheong Thiam Leong (PPP)	352	2.29%	15,725	360	68.26%

Parliament of Malaysia
Year	Constituency	Candidate	Votes	Pct	Opponent(s)	Votes	Pct	Ballots cast	Majority	Turnout
1969	P071 Bangsar	Goh Hock Guan (DAP)	37,050	79.34%	Lew Sip Hon (MCA)	9,648	20.66%	46,698	27,402	59.22%
1974	P081 Petaling	Goh Hock Guan (Gerakan)	12,868	36.87%	Oh Keng Seng (DAP)	14,106	40.41%	35,830	1,238	74.76%
1974	P081 Petaling	Goh Hock Guan (Gerakan)	12,868	36.87%	Pang Koik My (PEKEMAS)	5,961	17.08%	35,830	1,238	74.76%
1974	P081 Petaling	Goh Hock Guan (Gerakan)	12,868	36.87%	Lim Kui Sang (IND)	1,970	5.64%	35,830	1,238	74.76%
