= Menglembu (disambiguation) =

Menglembu is a township in Kinta District, Perak, Malaysia.

Menglembu may also refer to:

- Menglembu (federal constituency)
- Menglembu (state constituency)
