= Lew Sip Hon =

Malaysian politician

Yang Berbahagia Dato' Lew Sip Hon DPMS JMN KMN
- 刘集汉

Deputy Minister of Trade and Industry II
- In office 1 January 1978 – 1 June 1983 Serving with Abdul Manan Othman (Deputy Minister of Trade and Industry I)
- Preceded by: Mohamed Rahmat
- Succeeded by: Muhyiddin Yassin

Member of the Malaysian Parliament for Shah Alam
- In office 1974–1986
- Preceded by: new constituency
- Succeeded by: Rahmah Othman

Personal details
- Born: 27 June 1925 Bagan Serai, Perak, Federated Malay States
- Died: 7 June 2016 (aged 90) Kuala Lumpur, Malaysia
- Party: Malaysian Chinese Association (MCA)
- Other political affiliations: Alliance Party; Barisan Nasional (BN)
- Spouse: Datin Goh Min Check
- Children: 5

Lew Sip Hon (27 June 1925 – 7 June 2016) was a Malaysian politician and former vice president of the MCA. He was also a Member of Parliament for Shah Alam (1974-1986) and Deputy Minister of Trade and Industry of Malaysia. Other positions he has held include Ambassador of Malaysia to the United States, Chairman of the Council of the UTAR College.

== Political career ==
Lew initially ran for parliamentary seat of Bangsar but lost to DAP candidate Goh Hock Guan. In 1973, he was appointed as Senator of Dewan Negara. He was successfully elected for MP for Shah Alam in 1974 and was subsequently appointed as Parliamentary Secretary of Primary Industries in 1976, Lew was promoted to Deputy Minister of Trade and Industry in 1978. He resigned as Deputy Minister of Trade and Industry in 1983, but he retained his post in MCA and MP of Shah Alam. Lew also resign as Chairman of UTAR council on 5 November 1983.

Lew later served as Ambassador of Malaysia to the United States from January 1984 to January 1986.

== Election results ==
Parliament of Malaysia
Year	Constituency	Candidate	Votes	Pct	Opponent(s)	Votes	Pct	Ballots cast	Majority	Turnout
1969	P071 Bangsar	Lew Sip Hon (MCA)	9,648	20.66%	Goh Hock Guan (DAP)	37,050	79.34%	46,698	27,402	59.22%
1974	P080 Shah Alam	Lew Sip Hon (MCA)	17,882	61.72%	K. Ramasen (DAP)	8,192	28.28%	30,480	9,690	73.92%
1974	P080 Shah Alam	Lew Sip Hon (MCA)	17,882	61.72%	J. P. Samuel Raj (PEKEMAS)	2,898	10.00%	30,480	9,690	73.92%
1978	P080 Shah Alam	Lew Sip Hon (MCA)	29,098	57.74%	Liew Fatt Yuen (DAP)	19,434	38.56%	51,453	9,664	72.07%
1978	P080 Shah Alam	Lew Sip Hon (MCA)	29,098	57.74%	J. P. Samuel Raj (PEKEMAS)	1,862	3.69%	51,453	9,664	72.07%
1982	P080 Shah Alam	Lew Sip Hon (MCA)	47,020	66.07%	Wee Sin Chuan @ Gwee Sin Chuan (DAP)	24,148	33.93%	73,033	22,872	72.17%

== Personal life ==
Lew was married to Datin Goh Min Check. Goh died on 10 January 2015.

== Death ==
Lew died on 7 June 2016 in the age 90.

== Honours ==
- Malaya
  - Officer of the Order of the Defender of the Realm (KMN) (1962)
- Malaysia
  - Companion of the Order of the Defender of the Realm (JMN) (1976)
- Selangor
  - Knight Commander of the Order of the Crown of Selangor (DPMS) – Dato' (1978)
