= Biswell =

Biswell is a surname. Notable people with the surname include:

- Andrew Biswell, British biographer
- George Biswell (1904–1981), British footballer

== See also ==
- Bissell
