= Ipoh (federal constituency) =

Perak constituency

Defunct federal constituency
- Legislature: Dewan Rakyat
- Constituency created: 1958
- Constituency abolished: 1995
- First contested: 1959
- Last contested: 1990

Ipoh was a federal constituency in Perak, Malaysia, that was represented in the Dewan Rakyat from 1959 to 1995.

The federal constituency was created in the 1958 redistribution and was mandated to return a single member to the Dewan Rakyat under the first past the post voting system.

== History ==
It was abolished in 1995 when it was redistributed.

=== Representation history ===
Members of Parliament for Ipoh
Parliament	No	Years	Member	Party	Vote Share
Constituency created from Ipoh-Menglembu
Parliament of the Federation of Malaya
1st	P050	1959-1963	Darma Raja Seenivasagam (தர்ம ராஜா சீனிவாசகம்)	PPP	12,242; 60.53%
Parliament of Malaysia
1st	P050	1963-1964	Darma Raja Seenivasagam (தர்ம ராஜா சீனிவாசகம்)	PPP	12,242; 60.53%
2nd	P050	1964-1969	Darma Raja Seenivasagam (தர்ம ராஜா சீனிவாசகம்)	PPP	13,800; 55.25%
		1969-1971	Parliament was suspended		
3rd	P050	1971-1973	R. C. Mahadeva Rayan (ஆர். சி. மகாதேவ ராயன்)	PPP	23,979; 82.09%
3rd	P050	1973-1974	R. C. Mahadeva Rayan (ஆர். சி. மகாதேவ ராயன்)	BN (PPP)	23,979; 82.09%
4th	P054	1974-1978	Lim Cho Hock (林子鹤)	DAP	23,058; 62.11%
5th	P054	1978-1982	Lim Cho Hock (林子鹤)	DAP	30,680; 63.32%
6th	P054	1982-1986	Peter Chin Gan Oon (陈仁安)	BN (MCA)	29,022; 53.73%
7th	P059	1986-1990	Patto Perumal (பட்டு பெருமாள்)	DAP	21,401; 56.25%
8th	P059	1990-1995	Lau Dak Kee (刘德琦)	GR (DAP)	22,617; 58.00%
Constituency abolished, split into Ipoh Barat, Ipoh Timor and Tambun

=== State constituency ===
Parliamentary constituency	State constituency						
Parliamentary constituency	1955–59*	1959–1974	1974–1986	1986–1995	1995–2004	2004–2018	2018–present
Ipoh			Guntong				
Ipoh			Kepayang				
Ipoh		Pekan Bharu					
Ipoh		Pekan Lama					
Ipoh				Sungai Pari			
Ipoh				Tasek			

=== Historical boundaries ===
State Constituency	Area		
State Constituency	1959	1974	1984
Guntong		Bercham; Buntong; Dermawan; Silibin; Tasek	
Kepayang		Gunong Rapat; Ipoh; Kepayang; Pekan Razaki; Taman Golf	
Pekan Bharu	Bercham; Dermawan; Medan Ipoh; Ipoh Garden; Taman Star		
Pekan Lama	Buntong; Gunung Lang; Silibin; Tasek; Tawas		
Sungai Pari			Buntong; Taman Eden; Taman Idris; Taman Lim; Sungai Pari
Tasek			Gunung Lang; Ipoh; Klebang; Kuala Pari; Tawas

== Election results ==
Malaysian general election, 1990
Party	Candidate	Votes	%	∆%
DAP	Lau Dak Kee	22,617	58.00	▲1.75
BN	Peter Chin Gan Oon	16,377	42.00	▲0.61
Total valid votes		38,994	100.00	
Total rejected ballots		795		
Unreturned ballots		0		
Turnout		39,789	65.81	▼0.47
Registered electors		60,460		
Majority		6,240	16.00	▼1.14
DAP hold		Swing		

Malaysian general election, 1986
Party	Candidate	Votes	%	∆%
DAP	Patto Perumal	21,401	56.25	▲12.38
BN	Wong Chin Chye	15,747	41.39	▼12.34
SDP	Chan Kok Keong	900	2.37	▼2.37
Total valid votes		38,048	100.00	
Total rejected ballots		694		
Unreturned ballots		0		
Turnout		38,742	66.28	▼5.78
Registered electors		58,454		
Majority		5,654	14.86	▲5.00
DAP gain from BN		Swing		?

Malaysian general election, 1982
Party	Candidate	Votes	%	∆%
BN	Peter Chin Gan Oon	29,022	53.73	▲17.05
DAP	Lim Choo Hock	23,700	43.87	▼19.45
Independent	Leong Wai Mun	1,297	2.40	▲2.40
Total valid votes		54,019	100.00	
Total rejected ballots		1,185		
Unreturned ballots		0		
Turnout		55,204	72.06	▼6.54
Registered electors		76,613		
Majority		5,322	9.86	▼16.78
BN gain from DAP		Swing		?

Malaysian general election, 1978
Party	Candidate	Votes	%	∆%
DAP	Lim Cho Hock	30,680	63.32	▲1.21
BN	Kuan Peng Soon @ Kuan Peng Ching	17,771	36.68	▲3.59
Total valid votes		48,451	100.00	
Total rejected ballots		1,389		
Unreturned ballots		0		
Turnout		49,840	78.60	▲4.43
Registered electors		63,408		
Majority		12,909	26.64	▼2.38
DAP hold		Swing		

Malaysian general election, 1974
Party	Candidate	Votes	%	∆%
DAP	Lim Cho Hock	23,058	62.11	▲62.11
BN	R. C. Mahadeva Rayan	12,283	33.09	▼49.00
Independent	Too Joon Hing	1,781	4.80	▲4.80
Total valid votes		37,122	100.00	
Total rejected ballots		1,125		
Unreturned ballots		0		
Turnout		38,247	74.17	▲0.16
Registered electors		51,569		
Majority		10,775	29.02	▼35.16
DAP gain from PPP		Swing		?

Malaysian general election, 1969
Party	Candidate	Votes	%	∆%
PPP	R. C. Mahadeva Rayan	23,979	82.09	▲26.84
Alliance	Toh Seang Eng	5,231	17.91	▼17.71
Total valid votes		29,210	100.00	
Total rejected ballots		926		
Unreturned ballots		0		
Turnout		30,136	74.01	▼3.58
Registered electors		40,718		
Majority		18,748	64.18	▼44.55
PPP hold		Swing		

Malaysian general election, 1964
Party	Candidate	Votes	%	∆%
PPP	D. R. Seenivasagam	13,800	55.25	▼5.28
Alliance	Cheah Chun Ching	8,897	35.62	▲3.33
Socialist Front	Wong Kim Thim	2,280	9.13	▲1.95
Total valid votes		24,977	100.00	
Total rejected ballots		831		
Unreturned ballots		0		
Turnout		25,808	77.59	▲10.64
Registered electors		33,261		
Majority		4,903	19.63	▼8.61
PPP hold		Swing		

Malayan general election, 1959
Party	Candidate	Votes	%
PPP	D. R. Seenivasagam	12,242	60.53
Alliance	Chang Hoey Chan	6,531	32.29
Socialist Front	Yoon Foo Thong	1,452	7.18
Total valid votes		20,225	100.00
Total rejected ballots		167	
Unreturned ballots		0	
Turnout		20,392	66.95
Registered electors		30,457	
Majority		5,711	28.24
This was a new constituency created.
