= Lee Poh Ping =

Malaysian professor and political scientist

- 李宝平
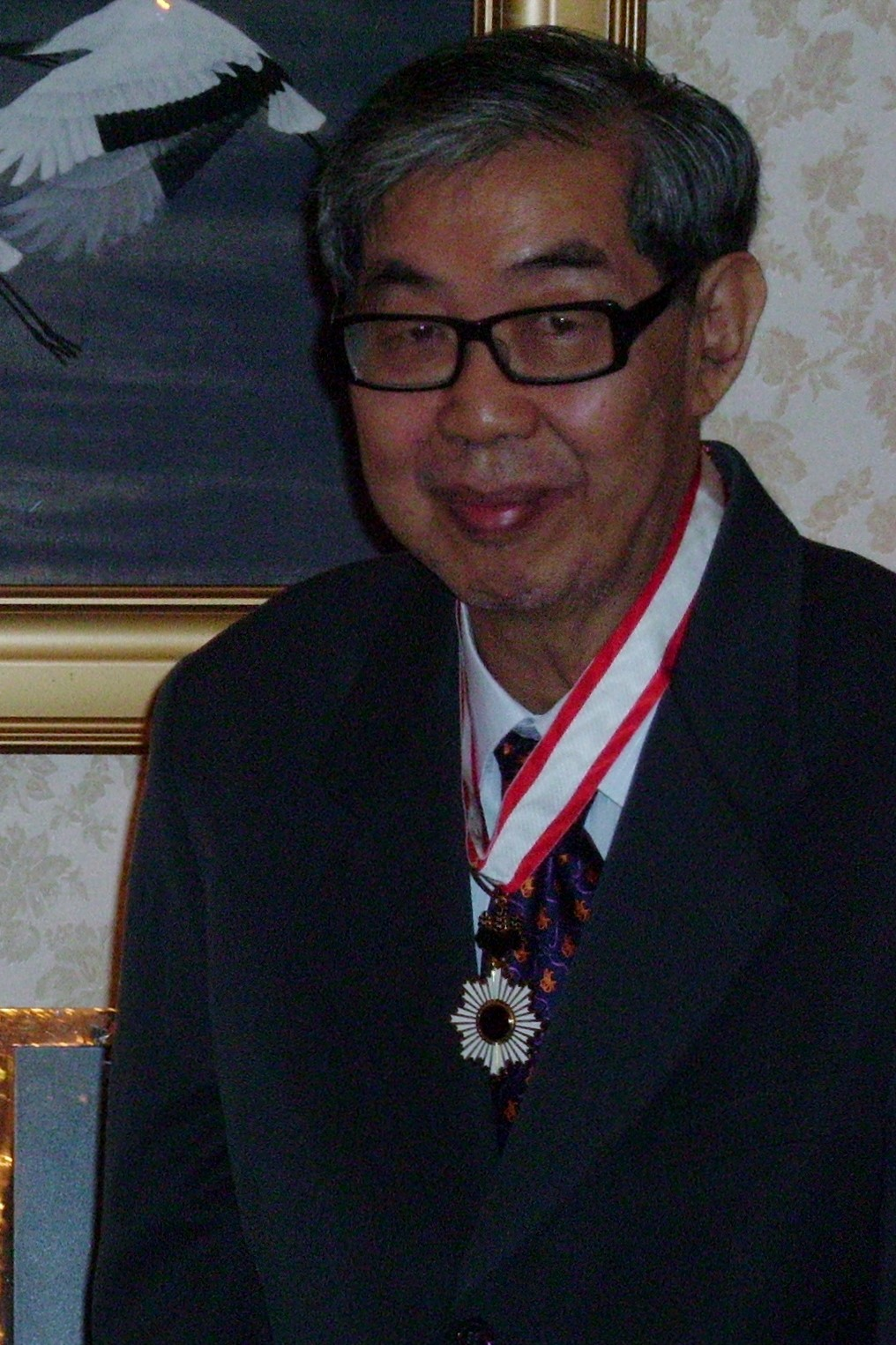
- Lee receiving the Order of the Rising Sun in July 2010
- Born: 1 April 1942; Ipoh, Perak, Malaya
- Died: 21 November 2016 (aged 74); University Malaya Medical Centre, Kuala Lumpur, Malaysia
- Education: University of Malaya (B.A.); Cornell University (Ph.D.)
- Spouse: Cheong Suet Mooi (m. 1984)
- Scientific career
- Fields: Political science
- Workplaces: University of Malaya (Professor); National University of Malaysia
- Doctoral advisor: Benedict Anderson
- Other academic advisors: Wang Gungwu

Lee Poh Ping

Chinese name
- Traditional Chinese: 李寶平
- Simplified Chinese: 李宝平
- Hanyu Pinyin: Lǐ Bǎopíng
- Jyutping: Lei5 Bou2 Ping4
- Hokkien POJ: Lí Pó-pêng
- Tâi-lô: Lí Pó-pîng

Lee Poh Ping (simplified Chinese: 李宝平; traditional Chinese: 李寶平; pinyin: Lǐ Bǎopíng; Jyutping: Lei5 Bou2 Ping4; Pe̍h-ōe-jī: Lí Pó-pêng; 1 April 1942 – 21 November 2016) was a Malaysian professor and political scientist. He is known for his work in international relations, contributions to the development of Japanese studies in Malaysia, and fostering networks of scholars in the country.

== Early life ==
Lee was born in Ipoh, Perak where he attended the Anglo-Chinese School. After obtaining his Senior Cambridge in 1958, he underwent training for two years at the Malayan Teacher Training College in Brinsford Lodge, Wolverhampton, subsequently becoming a teacher upon his return to Ipoh.

== Education ==
In 1967, Lee received a first class B.A in History from the University of Malaya. In 1974, Lee received a PhD in Government from Cornell University where he studied under Benedict Anderson.

== Career ==
Lee lectured at the University of Malaya in the Division of Public Administration, obtaining his full professorship in 1992.

As an expert in international relations, he was considered an authority on the subject in Southeast Asia. He was instrumental in bringing prominent international academics from the United States, Japan, China and Australia to interact with their Malaysian counterparts at the institutions where he worked. In his later years, he devoted much of his time to the study of China-Malaysia relations at the Institute of China Studies in the University of Malaya. He was a rigorous, theoretically-informed analyst who consistently lifted the quality of policy deliberation in Malaysia and Southeast Asia.

Lee was president of the Malaysian Association of Japanese Studies (MAJAS) from 1998 to 2014, and was also the chairman for the Malaysian-American Commission on Educational Exchange (MACEE) in the years 2001 and 2003.

In 2010, he was granted the Order of the Rising Sun by the Emperor of Japan in recognition of his important research on Japan's foreign relations. He was presented the award by the Japanese Ambassador to Malaysia at the time, Masahiko Horie.

== Personal life ==
Lee died at the University Malaya Medical Centre on November 21, 2016 after a fall. He was still associated with the University of Malaya at the time of his passing, holding the position of Senior Research Fellow at the Institute of China Studies.

== Honours ==
=== Foreign honours ===
- Japan
  - 3rd Class, Gold Rays with Neck Ribbon of the Order of the Rising Sun (2010)

== Key Publications ==
- Chinese Society in Nineteenth Century Singapore. Oxford University Press. 1978. ISBN 0195803841.
- Lee Poh Ping; Lim Chee Peng, eds. (1979). The role of Japanese direct investment in Malaysia. Institute of Southeast Asian Studies. ISBN 9789814376594.
- Lee Poh Ping; Tham Siew Yean; T.Yu, George, eds. (2006). The Emerging East Asian Community: Security and Economic Issues. Penerbit Universiti Kebangsaan Malaysia. ISBN 9679427641.
- Lee Poh Ping; Othman, Norani; Tham Siew Yean, eds. (2008). Community in ASEAN: Ideas & Practices. Penerbit Universiti Kebangsaan Malaysia. ISBN 9789679428667.
- Lee Poh Ping; Nasrudin, Mohamad, eds. (2009). Japanese Relations With Asean Since The Fukuda Doctrine. University of Malaya. ISBN 9789675148453.
- Ngeow, Chow-Bing; Kuik, Cheng-Chwee, eds. (2018). Rising China, Resilient Japan, Resourceful ASEAN: Selected Writings of Lee Poh Ping on East Asian International Relations. Strategic Information and Research Development Centre. ISBN 9789672165187.
- Wong, Danny; Cheong, Kee-Cheok; Lee, Kam-Hing, eds. (2018). The Chinese Overseas in Malaysia in an Era of Change. University of Malaya. ISBN 9789834880125.
