= V. David =

Malaysian politician (1932–2005)

David S. Vethamuthu (Tamil: வி. டேவிட்) (26 August 1932 – 10 July 2005) was a Malaysian unionist and opposition politician. He won a seat in the Malaysian parliament four times, representing the constituencies of Bangsar, Dato' Kramat, Damansara and Puchong.

While in parliament, he was known to be fearless and vocal in raising issues concerning the Indian community in Malaysia. He later became the chairman of the World Tamil Association in 1984. He is famously known for making Labour Day a public holiday in Malaysia.

== Career ==
=== Trade unions ===
David was a founding member and secretary of Selangor Factories Association in 1953. He was known as 'King David' among local and international trade union circles and served as MTUC secretary-general from 1976 to 1992. He was also the Transport Workers Union secretary-general from 1958 to 1995.

David was best known for setting up the Workers Institute of Technology (WIT) in Port Klang in the early 1970s, which provided education opportunities for thousands of workers' children over the years.

At the international level, he served as the executive board member of the International Transport Federation and the International Confederation of Free Trade Union, and represented Malaysian workers at numerous International Labour Organization (ILO) conferences in Geneva, Switzerland.

=== Politics ===
David was elected as Kuala Lumpur town councillor and became the Transport Workers Union's secretary in 1958. In 1959, he was elected Bangsar Member of Parliament under the ticket of the Malayan Peoples' Socialist Front as well as the state seat of Pantai, both in Selangor. However, in 1964, he lost his seat to Devan Nair of the People's Action Party although he kept his state seat.

In August 1963, David expressed caution about the upcoming Malaysian merger in parliament, concerned about the reliability of Lee Kuan Yew.

In 1969, David returned to parliament by winning the Dato' Kramat seat in Penang and was re-elected to his Pantai state seat for the third time, both under the newly formed Parti Gerakan Rakyat Malaysia.

When Gerakan joined the Barisan Nasional in 1973, David resigned to join the Parti Keadilan Masyarakat Malaysia (Pekemas). In the 1974 general election, both his Dato' Kramat and Pantai seats were abolished in a re-delineation exercise. David contested in the Jelutong parliament seat (also in Penang) for Pekemas against Rasiah Rajasingam, a former Gerakan colleague, but lost.

In 1978, as a candidate of the Democratic Action Party this time, David defeated Malaysian Indian Congress strongman, Deputy Minister S. Subramaniam for the Damansara parliament seat. He failed to retain his seat again in 1982 to Tan Koon Swan who later became Malaysian Chinese Association president. In 1986 and 1990, David was elected as Puchong Member of Parliament and, in 1995, stepped down for health reasons.

David was arrested under the Emergency Ordinance in 1958. He was also arrested under Internal Security Act in 1964 and 1969 (after the 13 May race riots).

David became chairman of the World Tamil Association in 1984. He authored a book, Freedom that Never Came, chronicling his views on the post-independence period in Malaysia.

== Death ==
David died in July 2005. He had served the workers for nearly 40 years from 1958 until he fell sick in 1995.

His much younger cousin Isaiah Jacob was appointed to the Dewan Negara in March 2023. A member of PKR, he represents the interests of people with disabilities.

== Recognition ==
The Malaysian Trades Union Congress (MTUC) has called on the Selangor state government to name a road after veteran trade unionist, the late V. David, in appreciation of his lifelong struggle to fight for workers' rights.

MTUC vice-president A. Balasubramaniam said there was already a precedent when Jalan 222 here was named after P. P. Narayanan, another noteworthy trade unionist. He said David deserved the honour because he served the workers for nearly 40 years from 1958 until he fell sick in 1995.

Cuepacs secretary-general Ahmad Shah Mohd Zin supported the proposal, saying union leaders should also be recognised "for their struggles and sacrifices in improving the lives of helpless workers."

== Election results ==
Parliament of Malaysia
Year	Constituency	Candidate	Votes	Pct	Opponent(s)	Votes	Pct	Ballots cast	Majority	Turnout
1959	P071 Bangsar	V. David (LPM)	9,734	40.59%	Koh Pooi Kee (IND)	6,821	28.45%	24,177	2,913	68.01%
1959	P071 Bangsar	V. David (LPM)	9,734	40.59%	Lau Joo Kooi (MCA)	5,036	21.00%	24,177	2,913	68.01%
1959	P071 Bangsar	V. David (LPM)	9,734	40.59%	Ong Yeow Kay (PPP)	2,388	9.96%	24,177	2,913	68.01%
1964	P071 Bangsar	V. David (LPM)	12,686	33.24%	Devan Nair (PAP)	13,494	35.36%	39,453	808	67.72%
1964	P071 Bangsar	V. David (LPM)	12,686	33.24%	Koh Pooi Kee (MCA)	9,761	25.58%	39,453	808	67.72%
1964	P071 Bangsar	V. David (LPM)	12,686	33.24%	Chew Choo Soot (PPP)	2,219	5.81%	39,453	808	67.72%
1969	P037 Dato' Kramat	V. David (Gerakan)	17,272	75.40%	Lim Chong Hai (MCA)	5,635	24.60%	23,955	11,637	77.14%
1974	P043 Jelutong	V. David (PEKEMAS)	6,955	20.05%	Rasiah Rajasingam (Gerakan)	16,112	46.45%	35,560	5,960	79.74%
1974	P043 Jelutong	V. David (PEKEMAS)	6,955	20.05%	Gooi Hock Seng @ Goi Hock Seng (DAP)	10,152	29.27%	35,560	5,960	79.74%
1974	P043 Jelutong	V. David (PEKEMAS)	6,955	20.05%	Teh Eng Siang (PSRM)	1,467	4.23%	35,560	5,960	79.74%
1978	P086 Damansara	V. David (DAP)	21,461	47.43%	Subramaniam Sinniah (MIC)	18,239	40.31%	45,584	3,222	67.75%
1978	P086 Damansara	V. David (DAP)	21,461	47.43%	Syed Ibrahim Syed Abdul Rahman (PAS)	5,386	11.90%	45,584	3,222	67.75%
1978	P086 Damansara	V. David (DAP)	21,461	47.43%	Thinakaran Rajakannu (PEKEMAS)	161	0.36%	45,584	3,222	67.75%
1982	P086 Damansara	V. David (DAP)	20,137	34.53%	Tan Koon Swan (MCA)	34,659	59.43%	58,772	14,522	67.88%
1982	P086 Damansara	V. David (DAP)	20,137	34.53%	Ramli Mohamed Yasin (PAS)	3,527	6.05%	58,772	14,522	67.88%
1986	P091 Puchong	V. David (DAP)	35,145	58.72%	Lui Thai Heng (MCA)	20,616	34.45%	61,052	14,529	75.37%
1986	P091 Puchong	V. David (DAP)	35,145	58.72%	Asri Janang (PAS)	2,409	4.02%	61,052	14,529	75.37%
1986	P091 Puchong	V. David (DAP)	35,145	58.72%	Yeoh Poh San (SDP)	1,684	2.81%	61,052	14,529	75.37%
1990	P091 Puchong	V. David (DAP)	34,967	51.69%	Tan Yee Kew (MCA)	32,686	48.31%	68,684	2,281	69.57%

Selangor State Legislative Assembly
Year	Constituency	Candidate	Votes	Pct	Opponent(s)	Votes	Pct	Ballots cast	Majority	Turnout
1964	N13 Pantai	V. David (LPM)	5,701	37.14%	Seow Yu Boon (MCA)	5,341	34.79%	15,725	360	68.26%
1964	N13 Pantai	V. David (LPM)	5,701	37.14%	Goh Hock Guan (PAP)	3,958	25.78%	15,725	360	68.26%
1964	N13 Pantai	V. David (LPM)	5,701	37.14%	Cheong Thiam Leong (PPP)	352	2.29%	15,725	360	68.26%
1969	N13 Pantai	V. David (Gerakan)	16,117	72.58%	C. K. Cheah (MCA)	6,088	27.42%	23,172	10,029	62.69%
1974	N25 Petaling Jaya	V. David (PEKEMAS)	5,219	26.25%	Fan Yew Teng (DAP)	8,597	43.24%	20,248	2,530	74.85%
1974	N25 Petaling Jaya	V. David (PEKEMAS)	5,219	26.25%	Chan Jee Swee (Gerakan)	6,067	30.51%	20,248	2,530	74.85%

Trade union offices
Preceded by Yahaya Mohd Ali	General Secretary of the Malaysian Trade Union Congress; 1978–1992	Succeeded by Govindasamy Rajasekaran
