= Menglembu (federal constituency) =

Perak constituency

Defunct federal constituency
- Legislature: Dewan Rakyat
- Constituency created: 1958
- Constituency abolished: 1986
- First contested: 1959
- Last contested: 1982

Menglembu was a federal constituency in the Perak, Malaysia, that was represented in the Dewan Rakyat from 1959 to 1986.

The federal constituency was created in the 1958 redistribution and was mandated to return a single member to the Dewan Rakyat under the first past the post voting system.

== History ==
It was abolished in 1986 when it was redistributed.

=== Representation history ===
Members of Parliament for Menglembu
Parliament	No	Years	Member	Party	Vote Share
Constituency created from Ipoh-Menglembu
Parliament of the Federation of Malaya
1st	P051	1959-1963	Sri Padhmaraja Seenivasagam (ஸ்ரீ பத்மராஜா சீனிவாசகம்)	PPP	14,338; 65.43%
Parliament of Malaysia
1st	P051	1963-1964	Sri Padhmaraja Seenivasagam (ஸ்ரீ பத்மராஜா சீனிவாசகம்)	PPP	14,338; 65.43%
2nd	P051	1964-1969	Sri Padhmaraja Seenivasagam (ஸ்ரீ பத்மராஜா சீனிவாசகம்)	PPP	20,367; 58.08%
		1969-1971	Parliament was suspended		
3rd	P051	1971-1973	Sri Padhmaraja Seenivasagam (ஸ்ரீ பத்மராஜா சீனிவாசகம்)	PPP	29,0089; 81.01%
3rd	P051	1973-1974	Sri Padhmaraja Seenivasagam (ஸ்ரீ பத்மராஜா சீனிவாசகம்)	BN (PPP)	29,0089; 81.01%
4th	P055	1974-1978	Fan Yew Teng (范俊登)	DAP	22,505; 62.53%
5th	P055	1978-1982	Patto Perumal (பாட்டோ பெருமாள்)	DAP	29,573; 63.77%
6th	P055	1982-1986	Yew Foo Weng (游富荣)	BN (MCA)	27,187; 52.69%
Constituency abolished, split into Pasir Pinji, Batu Gajah and Gopeng

=== State constituency ===
Parliamentary constituency	State constituency						
Parliamentary constituency	1955–59*	1959–1974	1974–1986	1986–1995	1995–2004	2004–2018	2018–present
Menglembu		Kuala Pari					
Menglembu		Pasir Puteh					

=== Historical boundaries ===
State Constituency	Area	
State Constituency	1959	1974
Kuala Pari	Bukit Merah; Falim; Kuala Pari; Menglembu; Tebing Tinggi	Bukit Merah; Falim; Kampung Meranti Lapan; Lahat; Menglembu
Pasir Puteh	Gunung Rapat; Pasir Puteh; Pekan Razaki; Taman Shatin; Taman Boom Bak	Kampung Cempaka Sari; Kampung Paloh; Pasir Puteh; Taman Boon Bak; Tebing Tinggi

== Election results ==
Malaysian general election, 1982
Party	Candidate	Votes	%	∆%
BN	Yew Foo Weng	27,187	52.69	▲11.08
DAP	Lau Dak Kee	24,412	47.31	▼11.08
Total valid votes		51,599	100.00	
Total rejected ballots		1,824		
Unreturned ballots		0		
Turnout		53,423	73.88	▼4.10
Registered electors		72,307		
Majority		2,775	5.38	▼22.16
BN gain from DAP		Swing		?

Malaysian general election, 1978
Party	Candidate	Votes	%	∆%
DAP	Patto Perumal	29,573	63.77	▲63.77
BN	Lee Chan Fai @ Lee Soon Heng	16,803	36.23	▲36.23
Total valid votes		46,376	100.00	
Total rejected ballots		1,536		
Unreturned ballots		0		
Turnout		47,912	77.98	▲2.53
Registered electors		61,439		
Majority		12,770	27.54	▼2.32
DAP hold		Swing		

Malaysian general election, 1974
Party	Candidate	Votes	%	∆%
DAP	Fan Yew Teng	22,505	62.53	▲62.53
BN	S. P. Seenivasagam	11,757	32.66	▲32.66
Independent	Koo Eng Kuang	1,731	4.81	▲4.81
Total valid votes		35,993	100.00	
Total rejected ballots		1,004		
Unreturned ballots		0		
Turnout		36,997	75.45	▲3.60
Registered electors		51,316		
Majority		10,748	29.86	▲32.16
DAP gain from PPP		Swing		?

Malaysian general election, 1969
Party	Candidate	Votes	%	∆%
PPP	S. P. Seenivasagam	29,089	81.01	▲22.93
Alliance	Hew Chai Kee	6,818	18.99	▼13.08
Total valid votes		35,907	100.00	
Total rejected ballots		1,391		
Unreturned ballots		0		
Turnout		37,298	71.85	▼6.83
Registered electors		51,913		
Majority		22,271	62.02	▼32.16
PPP hold		Swing		

Malaysian general election, 1964
Party	Candidate	Votes	%	∆%
PPP	. P. Seenivasagam	20,367	58.08	▼7.35
Alliance	Lim Eng Chang	11,246	32.07	▲3.36
Socialist Front	Yunos Mohd Isa	3,457	9.86	▲4.01
Total valid votes		35,070	100.00	
Total rejected ballots		1,117		
Unreturned ballots		0		
Turnout		36,187	78.68	▲13.09
Registered electors		45,994		
Majority		9,121	26.01	▼39.58
PPP hold		Swing		

Malayan general election, 1959
Party	Candidate	Votes	%
PPP	S. P. Seenivasagam	14,338	65.43
Alliance	Wong Kok Weng	6,292	28.71
Socialist Front	Idham Khatib	1,283	5.85
Total valid votes		21,913	100.00
Total rejected ballots		131	
Unreturned ballots		0	
Turnout		22,044	65.59
Registered electors		33,609	
Majority		8,046	36.72
This was a new constituency created.
