= Ripple (newspaper) =

University of Leicester, UK, student newspaper

- Type: Online news and entertainment publication
- Editor-in-chief: Joseph Herbert
- Founded: 10 December 1957
- Relaunched: 20 September, 2025
- Headquarters: Attenborough Building
- City: Leicester
- Circulation: Student population
- Website: Official website

Ripple is the student newspaper at the University of Leicester, England. The publication operates almost entirely online and covers local and university-centered news, arts, entertainment, lifestyle, fictional works and student opinion articles. Ripple was initially launched in 1957 and was later called Galaxy Press, Leicester Student Magazine, and Leicester Student News. Following a period of inactivity, the publication changed its name back to Ripple in September 2025.

Ripple has featured a wide range of interviews with high-profile figures throughout its history, from Robert Mugabe and Yasser Arafat to more recent public figures such as Aaron Porter, Peter Soulsby and Dr Alex George.

Ripple is run by a team of 6 committee members, who support a team of student writers. The committee is elected by magazine members via the University of Leicester Students' Union and primarily oversees day-to-day operations, including external liaison, social media management, and student membership, while the internally elected committee seeks to offer guidance and support to student writers of varying experience and ability.

== History ==
Ripple was founded by Malcolm Bradbury in 1957. Past editors include Brian Abbs (1957–58), Richard Swann (1971–72), Marc Heal (1983–84), Andrew Biswell (1993–94) and Aaron Porter (2005–06).

In October 2012, the publication launched a website for the first time, providing daily news updates and other content in addition to the print editions published each term. This website has since been taken offline.

In May 2013, students at the University of Leicester elected President Christopher Everett as the first President of Ripple. The newly created role of President was designed so that the future editor would no longer be concerned with both content and the day-to-day running of the publication, and is tasked with undertaking responsibilities such as developing strategic goals for Ripple, organising and leading the Ripple executive, communicating with the Students' Union, ensuring funding and distribution for Ripple, and organising extra-publicatory activities for the Ripple's members.

In July 2020, the student publication was re-branded to Leicester Student Magazine by Zainab Bikar and Ella Johnson, following a period of society inactivity, with a notable shift into digital publication and increased social media presence. Recent recognition includes receiving the 2021 Highly Commended Newcomer Publication accolade within the Midlands by the Student Publication Association, and a host of short-listings in the national awards.

Following a period of inactivity, the publication changed its name back to Ripple in September 2025. During this time the publication invested into social media and committed to relaunching a website and print newspaper, as well as begin to implement triannual print editions with a circulation of 1,000 copies each.

== In the news ==
In early 2006, the BBC revealed that the word "moony" was first used in print by The Ripple as part of the slang used during the 1987 RAG week, and led to the Oxford English Dictionary attributing the paper as the source of the word. This was followed by a feature on The Ripple as part of the BBC show Balderdash and Piffle, screened on Easter Sunday, 16 April 2006. First verbal use of "pulling a moony" is attributed to Mr. C. Bluementhal of the Leicester University Sailing Team during the 1984 BUSA sailing championship at Oxford Sailing Club.

The Ripple received national press attention again in November 2006 after speaking out against an attempt by the National Union of Students to restrict sales of several lad mags in the students' union shop.
