= Loga Bala Mohan Jaganathan =

Malaysian politician

Yang Berbahagia Dato' Loga Bala Mohan Jaganathan DSPN DSSA

11th President of the People's Progressive Party
- Incumbent
- Assumed office 1 September 2024
- Preceded by: Maglin Dennis D'Cruz

Deputy Minister of Federal Territories
- In office 16 May 2013 – 9 May 2018
- Monarchs: Abdul Halim; Muhammad V
- Prime Minister: Najib Razak
- Minister: Tengku Adnan Tengku Mansor
- Preceded by: Saravanan Murugan
- Succeeded by: Shahruddin Md Salleh
- Constituency: Senator

Senator

Appointed by Yang di-Pertuan Agong
- In office 2016–2019
- In office 2013–2016

Vice-President of the People's Progressive Party
- In office 2018–2019 Serving with Dato' Elayppen Muthusamy; Ong Chee Keng; Dato' Siva Kumar
- President: Maglin Dennis D'Cruz

Personal details
- Born: 3 April 1966 (age 60) Penang, Malaysia
- Party: People's Progressive Party (PPP)
- Other political affiliations: Barisan Nasional (BN)
- Education: King's College, University of London, United Kingdom (LLB); Pacific Western University (Phd)
- Occupation: Politician, businessman

Loga Bala Mohan a/l Jaganathan is a Malaysian politician who served as Deputy Minister of Federal Territories in the Barisan Nasional (BN) administration under former Prime Minister Najib Razak from May 2013 to May 2018 as well as Senator from May 2013 to May 2019. He is the current president of People's Progressive Party (myPPP), a component party of Barisan Nasional (BN).

== Political career ==
Loga Bala Mohan appointed as Deputy Minister of Federal Territories under former Prime Minister Najib Razak's cabinet. In 2018 general election, he was contest on Segambut seat, however defeated by former Speaker of the Selangor State Legislative Assembly, Hannah Yeoh Tseow Suan. On 18 November 2023, he was appointed as acting president of the party. On 1 September 2024, he elected as president of the party unopposed.

== Election results ==
Parliament of Malaysia
Year	Constituency	Candidate	Votes	Pct	Opponent(s)	Votes	Pct	Ballots cast	Majority	Turnout
2018	P117 Segambut	Loga Bala Mohan Jaganathan (MyPPP)	7,422	11.47%	Hannah Yeoh Tseow Suan (DAP)	53,124	82.07%	65,265	45,702	83.72%
2018	P117 Segambut	Loga Bala Mohan Jaganathan (MyPPP)	7,422	11.47%	Mohd Solleh Ab Razak (PAS)	4,181	6.46%	65,265	45,702	83.72%

== Honours ==
- Penang :
  - Officer of the Order of the Defender of State (DSPN) – Dato' (2005)
- Selangor :
  - Knight Companion of the Order of Sultan Salahuddin Abdul Aziz Shah (DSSA) – Dato' (2001)
