= Aaron Porter =

British Consultant (born 1985)

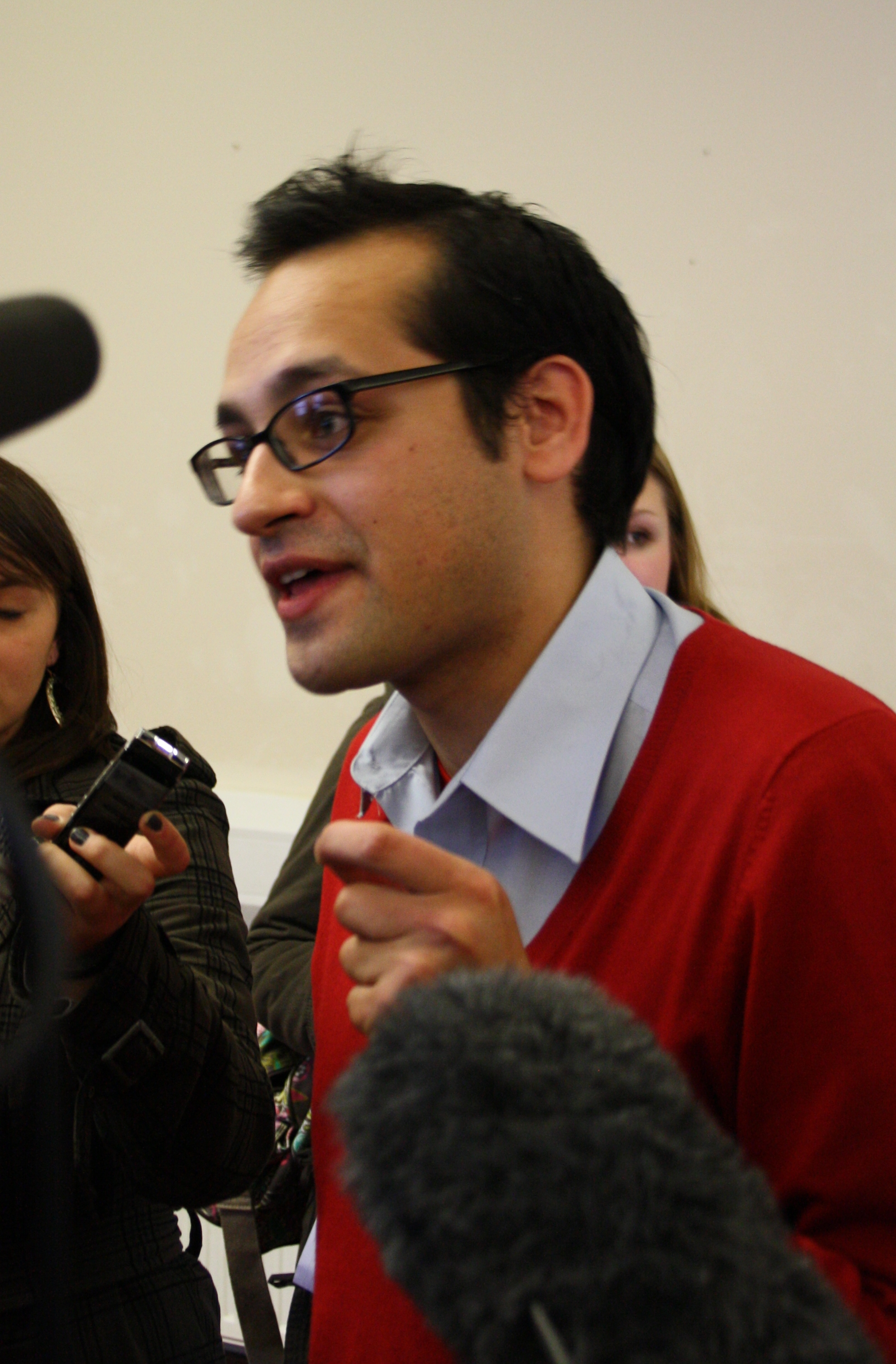
- Porter in 2010

54th President of the National Union of Students
- In office 10 June 2010 – 30 June 2011
- Preceded by: Wes Streeting
- Succeeded by: Liam Burns

Personal details
- Born: Aaron Ross Porter; 11 January 1985 (age 41)
- Party: Labour
- Education: University of Leicester

Aaron Ross Porter (born 11 January 1985) is a board director and trustee and a former president of the National Union of Students in the United Kingdom; he was elected with a 65% majority and took office in June 2010 for one year.

== Background and positions held ==
Porter grew up and lived with his parents in Norbury, south London. His father was a policeman who grew up in London and his mother was a teacher from Trinidad.

Porter studied at Wilson's School in Wallington in south London, before studying English Literature at the University of Leicester, graduating with a BA in 2006. He took a leading role in the University of Leicester Students' Union, serving as the Union's Finance and Services Officer, and then as its Academic Affairs Officer, as well as being the editor of the student magazine, The Ripple.

Prior to becoming NUS President, Porter was twice elected as the NUS Vice-president (Higher Education), serving from July 2008 to June 2010. He was the first officer from the University of Leicester Students' Union to be elected to the National Union of Students' Executive Committee.

== Presidency of the National Union of Students ==
Porter stood for the Presidency of the NUS as the candidate of the Organised Independents faction, but is a member of the Labour Party. He was subsequently elected with a 65% majority and took office in June 2010, which he would hold for the period of one year. Taking control of the Union, Porter put forward his views that he was in favour of lowering the voting age to sixteen, and stated he would lead a national demonstration against the government's planned rise in tuition fees before any vote in Parliament on the issue. On taking up the NUS Presidency, Porter was profiled in The Observer where he re-stated his opposition to any increase in tuition fees as well as the need for a new approach to campaigning that includes both formal lobbying as well as active campaigning.

Backing a graduate tax as an alternative method of financing higher education, Porter stated that funding would need to be fair and progressive for students to support it. A keynote speech on the future of higher education warned of the implications of a funding crisis. He has also been vocal on the issue of graduate employment with significant national coverage. Porter appeared widely in the media including the Daily Politics television show, Newsnight and also on BBC Question Time, arguing against the raising of students' tuition fees.

In response to the review of Higher Education Funding and Student Finance chaired by Lord Browne, the National Union of Students organised a National Demonstration in London jointly with the University and College Union. 50,000 protestors took part in the protest, at the end of which Porter addressed a rally outside Tate Britain. During the immediate aftermath of this demonstration on 10 November 2010, by over 50,000 people, Porter condemned the occupation of the Conservative Party's headquarters, referring to it as "violence by a tiny minority".

In January 2011 at an anti-cuts march and rally in Manchester, Porter was escorted away by police from a small section of the crowd of student protesters who were heckling and shouting "you're a Tory too" – a chant commonly used against Liberal Democrats during the student fees protests. There was also a report claiming their photographer had overheard antisemitic abuse, despite Porter not being Jewish.

In February 2011 Porter said he had decided not to seek re-election for Presidency of the NUS, stating he felt the Union would benefit from new leadership.

== Post-Presidency ==
In September 2011 Porter contributed to the book What Next for Labour? Ideas for a new generation; his piece was entitled "Where Next for Labour’s Higher Education Policy?"

Porter now holds a portfolio of non-executive board and trustee roles. He is chair of BPP University, deputy chair of Goldsmiths University, on the board of the Institute and Faculty of Actuaries and a trustee of the King's Head Theatre. In August 2023, he was appointed by the Privy Council onto the governing body of a healthcare regulator, the General Chiropractic Council. He is also Associate Director (Governance) for AdvanceHE a development agency for higher education, and has advised over 50 universities on their governance across. the UK, Ireland and Australia.

He was Director of External Affairs for the National Centre for Universities and Business, Honorary Research Fellow at the University of Winchester and on the advisory board for the Office for Fair Access (OFFA).

In July 2014, he was awarded an Honorary Doctorate of Laws by his alma mater, the University of Leicester at their summer graduation ceremony to recognise his contribution to higher education and the student experience.

Political offices
Preceded by Wes Streeting	President of the National Union of Students; 2010–2011	Succeeded by Liam Burns
