= S. P. Seenivasagam =

Malaysian politician

Sri Padhmaraja Seenivasagam (1918–4 July 1975), also known by his initials SP, was a three-term MP in Malaysia who served as leader of the People's Progressive Party.

Along with his brother Dharma Raja (DR), SP Seenivasagam was known as a formidable lawyer and parliamentarian in the formative years of Malaya after independence.

He led the PPP to a sweeping win in the Ipoh municipal council elections in 1962, becoming the council's president. At this time the PPP held sway in Ipoh, while the Socialist Front was dominant in George Town and Malacca. However the federal government led by Umno then banned local council elections.

Following the May 13 racial riots and the death of his brother in 1969, SP made the decision to bring PPP into the ruling Barisan Nasional coalition. He lost his parliamentary and state seats in 1974 when he contested under the BN banner. He was then appointed to the Dewan Negara in 1975 but died three months later.

== Early life ==
SP Seenivasagam was born in Ipoh in 1918 and attended the Anderson School. He studied law at the Middle Temple, London, before the outbreak of the second World War. After the war he began his career as advocate and solicitor in 1949, working at the family firm S Seenivasagam & Sons.

== Political career ==
In the 1959 elections, he contested and won the Menglembu parliamentary seat. He garnered 14,338 votes, comfortably defeating rivals from the Alliance (Wong Kok Weng) and Socialist Front (Idham Khatib) with a majority of 8,046 votes. He also won the Kuala Pari seat in the Perak state assembly. He was to win both seats on three consecutive occasions holding them from 1959 to 1974.

While in the opposition, the Seenivasagam brothers led the PPP to form the short-lived Malaysian Solidarity Council (MSC) in 1965 comprising multi-racial parties like the People's Action Party and the United Democratic Party. Their contemporary Syed Husin Ali said that while the brothers were in the progressive camp, they were often seen as the voice of non-Malay perspectives.

The 1969 racial riots paralysed the nation and Parliament was suspended for 17 months. This eventually led SP to make the decision to bring the PPP into the newly formed Barisan Nasional coalition.

Both SP and the PPP were punished heavily for this in the 1974 elections. The party was almost wiped out and SP suffered a big defeat in Menglembu at the hands of DAP's Fan Yew Teng. He also lost his Kuala Pari state seat to Lim Nyit Sin of DAP.

On 14 April 1975, he was sworn in as a member of the Dewan Negara.

== Legal cases ==
In 1952, Seenivasagam defended a young Chinese girl named Lee Meng who was arrested for alleged militant communist activities during the Emergency.

Lee was captured by the British Malayan police force in Ipoh in July 1952 and tried for having a hand grenade in her possession. She was sentenced to death for her responsibility in issuing orders for several murders, but the case brought the brothers significant attention.

In 1965, his brother DR made an allegation of corruption against then education minister Abdul Rahman Talib in Parliament, and repeated it in front of a huge crowd, including Rahman, at the Chinese Assembly Hall. Rahman sued DR for defamation, with SP representing DR. Rahman lost the case and resigned as minister.

In 1971 he represented DAP's then Kampar MP Fan Yew Teng in a sedition appeal over a conviction for publishing an offensive article by then Penang DAP chairman Dr Ooi Kee Siak in the party’s newsletter The Rocket. SP successfully argued the appeal for Fan on the grounds of technicality and a retrial was ordered. Ironically it was Fan who challenged and defeated SP for his Menglembu seat in the 1974 elections.

== Election results ==
Parliament of the Federation of Malaya
Year	Constituency	Candidate	Votes	Pct	Opponent(s)	Votes	Pct	Ballots cast	Majority	Turnout
1959	P051 Menglembu	S. P. Seenivasagam (PPP)	14,338	65.43%	Wong Kok Weng (MCA)	6,292	28.71	22,044	8,046	65.59%
1959	P051 Menglembu	S. P. Seenivasagam (PPP)	14,338	65.43%	Idham Khatib (PRM)	1,283	5.85%	22,044	8,046	65.59%

Parliament of Malaysia
Year	Constituency	Candidate	Votes	Pct	Opponent(s)	Votes	Pct	Ballots cast	Majority	Turnout
1964	P051 Menglembu	S. P. Seenivasagam (PPP)	20,367	58.08%	Lim Eng Chang (MCA)	11,246	32.07%	36,187	9,121	78.68%
1964	P051 Menglembu	S. P. Seenivasagam (PPP)	20,367	58.08%	Yunos Mohd Isa (PRM)	3,457	9.86%	36,187	9,121	78.68%
1969	P051 Menglembu	S. P. Seenivasagam (PPP)	29,089	81.01%	Hew Chai Kee (MCA)	6,818	18.99%	37,298	22,271	71.85%
1974	P055 Menglembu	S. P. Seenivasagam (PPP)	11,757	32.66%	Fan Yew Teng (DAP)	22,505	62.53%	36,997	10,748	75.45%
1974	P055 Menglembu	S. P. Seenivasagam (PPP)	11,757	32.66%	Koo Eng Kuang (IND)	1,731	4.81%	36,997	10,748	75.45%

Perak State Legislative Assembly
Year	Constituency	Candidate	Votes	Pct	Opponent(s)	Votes	Pct	Ballots cast	Majority	Turnout
1959	N26 Kuala Pari	S. P. Seenivasagam (PPP)	7,187	61.91%	Chong Hong Chew (MCA)	4,422	38.09%	11,737	2,765	67.84%
1964	N26 Kuala Pari	S. P. Seenivasagam (PPP)	11,305	69.16%	Choy Kok Kuan (MCA)	5,040	30.84%	17,178	6,265	77.58%
1969	N26 Kuala Pari	S. P. Seenivasagam (PPP)	14,231	82.75%	Ang Liang Sim (MCA)	2,966	17.25%	18,029	11,265	70.18%
1974	N24 Kuala Pari	S. P. Seenivasagam (PPP)	5,819	35.62%	Lim Nyit Sin (DAP)	10,519	64.38%	17,659	4,700	77.35%

== Honours ==
Seenivasagam was awarded Paduka Mahkota Perak of the Order of the Perak State Crown in 1963 from Sultan Idris of Perak. In 1965 he was awarded the Dato Paduka Mahkota Perak, and in 1972 the Sultan elevated him to the title of Datuk Seri.

- Perak
  - Knight Grand Commander of the Order of the Perak State Crown (SPMP) – Dato' Seri (1972)
  - Knight Commander of the Order of the Perak State Crown (DPMP) – Dato' (1965)
  - Commander of the Order of the Perak State Crown (1963)

== Death ==
On July 4, 1975, he died of heart failure at his official residence. He was survived by his wife Puan Seri Danapakia Devi, who died in 2006.

Just prior to his death, the Ipoh Town Council in June 1975 proposed to rename Hugh Low Street and Belfield Street after DR and SP, but after some objections, he withdrew his consent.

Today, a road formerly known as Clayton Road, near Saint Michael’s Institution in Ipoh, has been renamed Jalan SP Seenivasagam in his honour.
