= D. R. Seenivasagam =

Malaysian politician

- டி. ஆர். சீனிவாசகம்
- Portrait of Seenivasagam

President of the People's Progressive Party (Malaysia)
- In office 1953 – 15 March 1969
- Preceded by: Position established
- Succeeded by: S. P. Seenivasagam

Member of the Parliament of Malaysia for Ipoh-Menglembu/Ipoh
- In office 1957–1969
- Preceded by: Leong Yew Koh (Ipoh-Menglembu); Position established (Ipoh)
- Succeeded by: Position abolished (Ipoh-Menglembu); R. C. Mahadeva Rayan (Ipoh)

Personal details
- Born: Darma Raja Seenivasagam; 1925 Ipoh, Perak, Malaysia
- Died: 15 March 1969 (aged 43–44) Ipoh, Perak, Malaysia
- Party: People's Progressive Party; Labour Party of Malaya (formerly)
- Relatives: S. P. Seenivasagam (brother)

Darma Raja Seenivasagam (Tamil: தர்ம ராஜா சீனிவாசகம்) (1925 – 15 March 1969) was a Malaysian politician who was the first leader of the People's Progressive Party (PPP) in Malaysia. He founded the PPP (known as the Perak Progressive Party until 1956) alongside his brother, S. P. Seenivasagam, in 1953 after they had split from the Labour Party of Malaya. They were both well-known lawyers in Malaya prior to forming the party.

As a Member of Parliament representing the Ipoh federal constituency from 1957 until his death in 1969, Seenivasagam was a national figure in the early years after the independence of Malaya, due to his high-profile legal cases as well as PPP's electoral successes in Ipoh. His death, at the age of 44, lead to a downturn in the fortunes of the party he founded.

== Biography ==
Darma Raja Seenivasagam was of Ceylonese Tamil ancestry, as his father was a Ceylonese lawyer from Jaffna.

Starting as a lawyer for his father's firm S Seenivasagam & Sons, DR became widely known for defending a young Chinese girl named Lee Meng who was arrested for alleged militant communist activities during the Emergency.

Lee was captured by the British Malayan police force in Ipoh in July 1952 and tried for having a hand grenade in her possession.

She was sentenced to death for her responsibility in issuing orders for several murders.

Although DR did not win this case, his reputation as a lawyer was bolstered by the case.

His party PPP had its stronghold in Perak and it received a lot of support, especially from the ethnic Chinese voters.

In the 1954 elections, first in which PPP was participating, he was elected to the Town Council of Ipoh and Menglembu under the ‘Alliance’ ticket (UMNO, Malayan Chinese Association, Malayan Indian Congress). He lost to Leong Yew Koh of the Alliance in the 1955 Federal Elections when contesting the Ipoh-Menglembu seat.

However, he was elected in a by-election in 1957 to the same parliamentary seat which was vacated by Leong who had just been appointed to become Malacca's first Governor. He secured 5,911 votes to defeat the Alliance candidate Yap Yin Fah by 1,820 votes. He went on to win the redesignated Ipoh parliamentary seat in the 1959 and 1964 elections, comfortably defeating candidates from the Alliance and the Socialist Front in three-way contests.

In the parliamentary elections of 1959, the PPP won four seats in Perak, while in 1964 it won two. Furthermore in the 1962 local council elections held in Perak, PPP won 57 per cent of the votes and 112 of 150 seats contested in the Kinta District. The Alliance won only 27 seats, while 11 seats went to the Socialist Front.

In the early years after Merdeka, the three most prominent municipalities of the time were George Town, Ipoh and Malacca, and while the PPP held sway in Ipoh, the other two were won by the Socialist Front leading to the mayorship of D.S. Ramanathan and Hasnul Hadi.

In August 1963, Seenivasagam spoke out against a fast merger to form Malaysia, concerned about Indonesian threats and the lack of opposition involvement in the process.

While in the opposition, Seenivasagam lead the PPP to form the short-lived Malaysian Solidarity Council (MSC) in 1965 comprising multi-racial parties like the People's Action Party and the United Democratic Party.

At the MSC's first and only general meeting, several leaders from these parties gave speeches supporting a Malaysian Malaysia. Seenivasagam in his speech accused the Alliance of using Article 153 of the Constitution of Malaysia to "bully non-Malays". His contemporary Syed Husin Ali said that while DR was ostensibly a progressive politician, he was often seen as the voice of non-Malay perspectives.

In 1965, DR famously made an allegation of corruption against then education minister Abdul Rahman Talib in Parliament, and repeated it in front of a huge crowd, including Rahman, at the Chinese Assembly Hall.

Rahman sued DR for defamation but lost the case and ended up resigning as a minister.

DR Seenivasagam died in March, 1969 aged 44.

== Legacy ==
His party repeated its success in the May, 1969 elections by winning four parliamentary seats and nearly gained control of the Perak state government.

However in 1973, his brother brought the party into the Barisan Nasional coalition and this led to a collapse in support as its voters turned to the Democratic Action Party.

D. R. Seenivasagam Park, formerly known as Coronation Park, is named after the politician. It is located in the centre of Ipoh (New Town) and is known for its scenic environment and recreational facilities.

It comprises recreational fields, an artificial lake filled with fish, a nursery for potted plants and a children's traffic playground. There is also a landscaped Japanese garden featuring a Japanese carp pond.

== Election results ==
Federal Legislative Council
Year	Constituency	Candidate	Votes	Pct	Opponent(s)	Votes	Pct	Ballots cast	Majority	Turnout
1955	Ipoh-Menglembu	D. R. Seenivasagam (PPP)	808	8.37%	Leong Yew Koh (MCA)	7,421	76.92%	9,651	6,438	82.70%
1955	Ipoh-Menglembu	D. R. Seenivasagam (PPP)	808	8.37%	Loh Ah Kee (NAP)	983	10.19%	9,651	6,438	82.70%
1955	Ipoh-Menglembu	D. R. Seenivasagam (PPP)	808	8.37%	W. E. Balasingam (IND)	439	4.55%	9,651	6,438	82.70%
1957	Ipoh-Menglembu	D. R. Seenivasagam (PPP)	5,911	59.09%	Yap Yin Fah (MCA)	4,091	40.91%	10,116	1,820	62.50%

Parliament of the Federation of Malaya
Year	Constituency	Candidate	Votes	Pct	Opponent(s)	Votes	Pct	Ballots cast	Majority	Turnout
1959	P050 Ipoh	D. R. Seenivasagam (PPP)	12,242	60.53%	Chang Hoey Chan (MCA)	6,531	32.29%	20,392	5,711	66.95%
1959	P050 Ipoh	D. R. Seenivasagam (PPP)	12,242	60.53%	Yoon Foo Thong (Lab)	1,452	7.18%	20,392	5,711	66.95%

Parliament of Malaysia
Year	Constituency	Candidate	Votes	Pct	Opponent(s)	Votes	Pct	Ballots cast	Majority	Turnout
1964	P050 Ipoh	D. R. Seenivasagam (PPP)	13,800	55.25%	Cheah Chun Ching (MCA)	8,897	35.62%	25,808	4,903	77.59%
1964	P050 Ipoh	D. R. Seenivasagam (PPP)	13,800	55.25%	Wong Kim Thim (Lab)	2,280	9.13%	25,808	4,903	77.59%

Perak State Legislative Assembly
Year	Constituency	Candidate	Votes	Pct	Opponent(s)	Votes	Pct	Ballots cast	Majority	Turnout
1955	Ipoh East	D. R. Seenivasagam (PPP)	597	27.70%	Yap Yin Fah (MCA)	1,558	72.30%	2,163	961	52.08%
1959	N24 Pekan Bharu	D. R. Seenivasagam (PPP)	6,048	58.49%	Chang Hoey Chan (MCA)	4,292	41.51%	10,445	1,756	69.59%
1964	N23 Pekan Lama	D. R. Seenivasagam (PPP)	7,548	63.12%	A. K. S. Maniam (MIC)	4,410	36.88%	13,555	3,138	75.16%
