= Brinsford Lodge =

Coordinates: 52.644°N 2.102°W

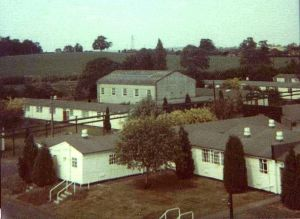
Brinsford Lodge. 1974

Brinsford Lodge was a hall of residence for The Polytechnic, Wolverhampton (now the University of Wolverhampton) from the mid-1960s to the early 1980s. Prior to that it was a Teacher Training College for Malaysian students and, during the Second World War, a hostel for employees at a nearby armaments factory. It was located on the outskirts of the Staffordshire village of Featherstone, about 5 miles north of Wolverhampton.

== The early years (1941 - 1955) ==
The site came into existence around 1941 when an armaments factory was built on a greenfield site to the north of Moseley Old Hall, to manufacture armour piercing shells. The site was in two parts with Hard Metal Tools Ltd (which became Royal Ordnance Speciality Metals) producing tungsten carbide heads, and the explosive and propellants filled at Royal Ordnance Factory Featherstone, (Filling Factory No. 17). "The development also included a hostel for employees at Brinsford Lodge".

A huge chunk of history is missing from this article, between 1948 and 1954 Brinsford Lodge hostel was used to house displaced persons and political exiles. Daily buses took them to work at Courtaulds in Wolverhampton (a maroon coloured AEC) and at Sankey's steel works in Bilston (a yellow and black Bedford). Many of the temporary residents are still alive and living in the area. There was a tragic event in 1961 or 62 while it was a college for Malayan students, a fire in which three girl students died.

Andrew Biswell recounts in his biography of Anthony Burgess, The Real Life of Anthony Burgess (page 117) that the novelist lectured at Brinsford Lodge in 1946–47. Working under the aegis of Birmingham University, Burgess taught various courses at the lodge including history, politics and literature to demobilized soldiers to prepare them for life as civilians. The lodge was at that time an all-male residential college. Burgess's employer was the Central Council for Adult Education in His Majesty's Forces, Biswell notes.

== Malayan Teacher Training (MTT) College (1955 - 1964) ==
In the early 1950s, the Federation of Malaya was in the process of achieving independence from the United Kingdom and, at that time, schools in Malaya were staffed predominantly by expatriate British teachers. In order to assist Malaya in becoming self-sufficient in teaching staff after independence, Brinsford Lodge was offered to the Malaysian government as a Teacher Training College.

The college opened in 1955. The courses taught there lasted for two years. There were up to 300 students - 150 juniors and 150 seniors – on site at any one time and the last cohort left the college in 1964.

The buildings were used for administration, teaching or living accommodation (known as houses). Teaching accommodation was identified by its function (for example: Classroom, Tutorial), and the houses were identified by letters of the alphabet (for example: J House). There is a Brinsford Alumni association based in Kuala Lumpur.

== Wolverhampton Polytechnic Halls of Residence (1964 - 1982) ==
Following the closure of the MTT, Brinsford Lodge became the Halls of Residence for Wolverhampton Polytechnic, providing single-occupancy study/bedrooms for up to 250 students. The site retained its existing catering facility and consequently offered half-board accommodation. The houses continued to be used for accommodation and were renamed as 'blocks' (for example: J Block). The teaching buildings were also turned into accommodation, and retained their previous naming convention suffixed with 'block'. The names were abbreviated in day-to-day usage, so that people were now living in CR (Classroom), Tut (Tutorial), Geog (Geography), etc. blocks, but there was no longer any association between the names and their original function. Each block held around a dozen students and, in addition to the study/bedrooms and bathrooms, provided minimal cooking and clothes-washing facilities. Pairs of rooms from the MTT rooms were joined and alternate doorways sealed over, giving larger single rooms for Polytechnic students. One block was used as a recreation room and periodically had music and dancing. At these events there was usually a bar as well.

The main disadvantage of the site was that its distance from the town centre meant daily coach services were needed to transport students to and from the main campus in the centre of Wolverhampton. Part-way through the 1973–4 academic year the Polytechnic opened a newly constructed self-catering hall (Randall Lines) near the Wolverhampton Wanderers football ground, in Wolverhampton town centre. This building was within walking distance of the main campus and its proximity had clear benefits regarding transport and easier access to the polytechnic facilities. Further halls of residence have since been opened.

Brinsford Lodge was notorious for reputedly being haunted. Many strange stories of supernatural noises and evil feelings abounded in the early 1980s. So much so that one of the accommodation blocks was closed off, as students refused to live there.

Brinsford Lodge closed as a Hall of Residence in 1982. Without the drying effect of the heating system the buildings deteriorated rapidly, and they were demolished within a couple of years. As of summer 2021 the site is being redeveloped for new housing.

== Further information ==
- An aerial view of the Brinsford Lodge site (Google maps). The site is to the left of the marker. The Google Streetview option now shows glimpses of the desolate site.
- Websites showing some of the history of Brinsford Lodge
