= Bangsar (federal constituency) =

Former constituency of Malaysia

Selangor constituency

Defunct federal constituency
- Legislature: Dewan Rakyat
- Constituency created: 1958
- Constituency abolished: 1974
- First contested: 1959
- Last contested: 1969

Bangsar was a federal constituency in Selangor, Malaysia, that was represented in the Dewan Rakyat from 1959 to 1974.

The federal constituency was created in the 1974 redistribution and was mandated to return a single member to the Dewan Rakyat under the first past the post voting system.

== History ==
It was abolished in 1974 when it was redistributed.

=== Representation history ===
Members of Parliament for Bangsar
Parliament	No	Years	Member	Party	Vote Share
Constituency created from Kuala Lumpur Barat
Parliament of the Federation of Malaya
1st	P071	1959-1963	V. David (வே. தேவிட்)	SF (Lab)	9,734; 40.59%
Parliament of Malaysia
1st	P071	1963-1964	V. David (வே. தேவிட்)	SB (Lab)	9,734; 40.59%
2nd	P071	1964-1965	Devan Nair (ദേവൻ നായർ)	PAP	13,494; 34.56%
2nd	P071	1965-1969	Devan Nair (ദേവൻ നായർ)	DAP	13,494; 34.56%
		1969-1971	Parliament was suspended		
3rd	P071	1971-1974	Goh Hock Guan (吴福源)	DAP	37,050; 79.34%
Constituency abolished, split into Kuala Lumpur Bandar, Damansara, Petaling and Sungei Besi

=== State constituency ===
Parliamentary constituency	State constituency						
Parliamentary constituency	1955–59*	1959–1974	1974–1986	1986–1995	1995–2004	2004–2018	2018–present
Bangsar		Pantai					
Bangsar		Salak					

=== Historical boundaries ===
State Constituency	Area
State Constituency	1959
Pantai	Bangsar; Kampung Kongo (Bandar Tun Razak); Kampung Kerinchi; Petaling Jaya; Taman Cheras
Salak	Bukit Petaling; Chan Sow Lin; Kampung Attap; Miharja; Pudu

== Election results ==
Malaysian general election, 1969
Party	Candidate	Votes	%	∆%
DAP	Goh Hock Guan	37,050	79.34	▲79.34
Alliance	Lew Sip Hon	9,648	20.66	▼4.92
Total valid votes		46,698	100.00	
Total rejected ballots		1,320		
Unreturned ballots		0		
Turnout		48,018	59.22	▼8.50
Registered electors		81,086		
Majority		27,402	58.68	▲56.56
DAP hold		Swing		

Malaysian general election, 1964
Party	Candidate	Votes	%	∆%
PAP	Devan Nair	13,494	35.36	▲35.36
Socialist Front	V. David	12,686	33.24	▼7.35
Alliance	Koh Pooi Kee	9,761	25.58	▲4.58
PPP	Chew Choo Soot	2,219	5.81	▼4.15
Total valid votes		38,160	100.00	
Total rejected ballots		1,293		
Unreturned ballots		0		
Turnout		39,453	67.72	▼0.29
Registered electors		58,261		
Majority		808	2.12	▼65.89
PAP gain from Socialist Front		Swing		?

Malayan general election, 1959
Party	Candidate	Votes	%
Socialist Front	V. David	9,734	40.59
Independent	Koh Pooi Kee	6,821	28.45
Alliance	Lau Joo Kooi	5,036	21.00
PPP	Ong Yeow Kay	2,388	9.96
Total valid votes		23,979	100.00
Total rejected ballots		198	
Unreturned ballots		0	
Turnout		24,177	68.01
Registered electors		35,549	
Majority		2,913	12.14
This was a new constituency created.
