= Puchong (federal constituency) =

Federal constituency of Selangor, Malaysia

Puchong (P103)
Selangor constituency

Federal constituency
- Legislature: Dewan Rakyat
- MP: Yeo Bee Yin; PH
- Constituency created: 1984
- First contested: 1986
- Last contested: 2022

Demographics
- Population (2020): 375,181
- Electors (2023): 156,057
- Area (km²): 78
- Pop. density (per km²): 4,810

Puchong is a federal constituency in Petaling District and Hulu Langat District, Selangor, Malaysia, that has been represented in the Dewan Rakyat from 1986 to 1995, from 2004 to present.

The federal constituency was created in the 1984 redistribution and is mandated to return a single member to the Dewan Rakyat under the first past the post voting system.

== Demographics ==
https://live.chinapress.com.my/ge15/2023election/Selangor

Ethnic breakdown of Puchong's electorate as of 2022
1. Chinese (49.4%)
2. Malay (37.3%)
3. Indian (10.9%)
4. Other ethnicities (2.42%)
Age breakdown of Puchong's electorate as of 2023
1. 18-20 (7.77%)
2. 21-29 (23.0%)
3. 30-39 (19.6%)
4. 40-49 (19.4%)
5. 50-59 (15.2%)
6. 60-69 (9.61%)
7. 70-79 (4.23%)
8. 80-89 (1.12%)
9. above 90 (0.13%)
Gender breakdown of Puchong's electorate as of 2022
1. Male (50.1%)
2. Female (49.9%)

== History ==
It was abolished in 1995 when it was redistributed. It was re-created in 2003.

=== Polling districts ===
According to the gazette issued on 18 July 2023, the Puchong constituency has a total of 35 polling districts.

| State constituency | Polling districts | Code | Location |
|---|---|---|---|
| Seri Kembangan (N28) | Serdang Lama | 103/28/01 | SJK (C) Kung Man Serdang |
| Seri Kembangan (N28) | Serdang Utama | 103/28/02 | SMK Seri Kembangan |
| Seri Kembangan (N28) | Seri Kembangan 2 | 103/28/03 | SMK Seri Kembangan |
| Seri Kembangan (N28) | Seri Kembangan 1 | 103/28/04 | SMK Seri Kembangan |
| Seri Kembangan (N28) | Seri Kembangan 4 | 103/28/05 | SJK (C) Serdang Baru 1 Seri Kembangan |
| Seri Kembangan (N28) | Seri Kembangan 5 | 103/28/06 | Balai Masyarakat Kawasan 5 Seri Kembangan |
| Seri Kembangan (N28) | Seri Kembangan 9 | 103/28/07 | SJK (C) Serdang Baru 1 Seri Kembangan |
| Seri Kembangan (N28) | Seri Kembangan 11 | 103/28/08 | Dewan Serbaguna Seri Kembangan |
| Seri Kembangan (N28) | Seri Kembangan 8 | 103/28/09 | Dewan Serbaguna Seri Kembangan |
| Seri Kembangan (N28) | Seri Kembangan 10 | 103/28/10 | Dewan Serbaguna Seri Kembangan |
| Seri Kembangan (N28) | Seri Kembangan 12 | 103/28/11 | Dewan Serbaguna Seri Kembangan |
| Seri Kembangan (N28) | Seri Kembangan 7 | 103/28/12 | Balai Masyarakat Jalan SK 7/6, Kawasan 7 Seri Kembangan |
| Seri Kembangan (N28) | Seri Kembangan 6 | 103/28/13 | Dewan Serbaguna Seri Kembangan |
| Seri Kembangan (N28) | Seri Kembangan 3 | 103/28/14 | SJK (C) Serdang Baru 1 Seri Kembangan |
| Seri Kembangan (N28) | Bukit Serdang | 103/28/15 | Pusat Komuniti MBSJ PP2 Bukit Serdang |
| Seri Kembangan (N28) | Taman Universiti Indah | 103/28/16 | SK Taman Universiti Seri Kembangan; SRA Taman Universiti Seri Kembangan |
| Seri Kembangan (N28) | Desa Serdang | 103/28/17 | SMK Desa Serdang |
| Seri Kembangan (N28) | Taman Muhibbah | 103/28/18 | Balai Masyarakat Taman Muhibbah |
| Seri Kembangan (N28) | Sungai Besi Indah | 103/28/19 | SK Taman Sungai Besi Indah |
| Seri Kembangan (N28) | Serdang Raya | 103/28/20 | Komplek Kemudahan Kemasyarakatan Serdang Raya |
| Seri Kembangan (N28) | Taman Bukit Belimbing | 103/28/21 | KAFA Integrasi Bukit Belimbing |
| Seri Serdang (N29) | Serdang Jaya 1 | 103/29/01 | SK Sri Serdang |
| Seri Serdang (N29) | Seri Serdang Utara | 103/29/02 | SMK Seri Indah Taman Sri Serdang |
| Seri Serdang (N29) | Kawasan UPM | 103/29/03 | SK Serdang |
| Seri Serdang (N29) | Kampung Sri Aman | 103/29/04 | Dewan Serbaguna MBSJ Kampung Seri Aman |
| Seri Serdang (N29) | Batu 14 Puchong | 103/29/05 | SMK Puchong Batu 14 |
| Seri Serdang (N29) | Seri Serdang Selatan 1 | 103/29/06 | SMK Seri Serdang |
| Seri Serdang (N29) | Bandar Bukit Puchong | 103/29/07 | SJK (C) Han Ming Puchong |
| Seri Serdang (N29) | Taman Puchong Utama | 103/29/08 | SK Puchong Utama 2 |
| Seri Serdang (N29) | Taman Pinggiran Putra | 103/29/09 | SJK (C) Bukit Serdang; SK Taman Desaminium |
| Seri Serdang (N29) | Serdang Jaya 2 | 103/29/10 | SJK (C) Serdang Baru (2) Seri Kembangan |
| Seri Serdang (N29) | Puchong Permai | 103/29/11 | SMK Puchong Perdana |
| Seri Serdang (N29) | Seri Indah | 103/29/12 | Balai Masyarakat Taman Puchong Perdana Jalan Perdana 4/2A |
| Seri Serdang (N29) | Seri Serdang Selatan 2 | 103/29/13 | KAFA Integrasi Manbul 'Ulum Taman Seri Serdang |
| Seri Serdang (N29) | Kampung Batu 13 | 103/29/14 | SRA Bt 13 (Kampung Kenangan) Puchong |

=== Representation history ===
Members of Parliament for Puchong
| Parliament | No | Years | Member | Party | Vote Share |
Constituency created from Ulu Langat and Petaling
| 7th | P091 | 1986–1990 | V. David (வே. தேவிட்) | DAP | 35,145; 58.72% |
| 8th | P091 | 1990–1995 | V. David (வே. தேவிட்) | GR (DAP) | 34,967; 51.69% |
Constituency abolished, split into Serdang and Petaling Jaya Selatan
Constituency re-created from Serdang and Subang
| 11th | P103 | 2004–2008 | Lau Yeng Peng (卢永平) | BN (GERAKAN) | 21,291; 53.38% |
| 12th | P103 | 2008–2013 | Gobind Singh Deo (ਗੋਬਿੰਦ ਸਿੰਘ ਦਿਓ) | PR (DAP) | 35,079; 60.94% |
| 13th | P103 | 2013–2015 | Gobind Singh Deo (ਗੋਬਿੰਦ ਸਿੰਘ ਦਿਓ) | PR (DAP) | 62,938; 67.62% |
| 13th | P103 | 2015–2018 | Gobind Singh Deo (ਗੋਬਿੰਦ ਸਿੰਘ ਦਿਓ) | PH (DAP) | 62,938; 67.62% |
| 14th | P103 | 2018–2022 | Gobind Singh Deo (ਗੋਬਿੰਦ ਸਿੰਘ ਦਿਓ) | PH (DAP) | 60,429; 72.39% |
| 15th | P103 | 2022–present | Yeo Bee Yin (杨美盈) | PH (DAP) | 79.425; 65.67% |

=== State constituency ===
| Parliamentary constituency | State constituency | | | | | | |
| Parliamentary constituency | 1955–59* | 1959–1974 | 1974–1986 | 1986–1995 | 1995–2004 | 2004–2018 | 2018–present |
|---|---|---|---|---|---|---|---|
| Puchong | | | | Bukit Gasing | | | |
| Puchong | | | | | | Kinrara | |
| Puchong | | | | Lindongan | | | |
| Puchong | | | | Serdang | | | |
| Puchong | | | | | | | Seri Kembangan |
| Puchong | | | | | | Seri Serdang | |

=== Historical boundaries ===
| State Constituency | Area | | |
| State Constituency | 1984 | 2003 | 2018 |
|---|---|---|---|
| Bukit Gasing | Bukit Gasing; Jalan Othman; Jalan Templer; Seksyen 1 - 11 Petaling Jaya; PJ Old Town | | |
| Kinrara | | Bukit Tandang; Kampung Kenangan; Puchong Jaya; Taman Perindustrian Puchong; USJ18 - 21 | |
| Lindongan | Bandar Puteri; Bukit Tandang; PJS 1 - 11; Puchong Jaya; Subang Jaya | | |
| Serdang | Kampung Sri Aman; Kinrara; Serdang; Seri Kembangan; Taman Universiti | | |
| Seri Kembangan | | | Bukit Serdang; Seri Kembangan; Sungai Besi Indah; Taman Bukit Belimbing; Taman Universiti |
| Seri Serdang | | Kinrara; Puchong; Puncak Jalil; Putra Permai; Serdang Jaya | Kampung Kenangan; Puchong Prima; Puchong Utama; Putra Permai; Serdang Jaya |

=== Current state assembly members ===
| No. | State Constituency | Member | Coalition (Party) |
|---|---|---|---|
| N28 | Seri Kembangan | Wong Siew Ki | PH (DAP) |
| N29 | Seri Serdang | Abbas Salimi Azmi | PH (AMANAH) |

=== Local governments & postcode ===
| No. | State Constituency | Local Government | Postcode |
|---|---|---|---|
| N28 | Seri Kembangan | Subang Jaya City Council; Kajang Municipal Council (Desa Serdang and Bukit Belimbing Area) | 43300 Seri Kembangan; 43400 Serdang; 47100, 47110, 47120, 47140, 47150 Puchong |
| N29 | Seri Serdang | Subang Jaya City Council | 43300 Seri Kembangan; 43400 Serdang; 47100, 47110, 47120, 47140, 47150 Puchong |

== Election results ==
Malaysian general election, 2022
| Party | Candidate | Votes | % | ∆% |
|---|---|---|---|---|
| PH | Yeo Bee Yin | 79,425 | 65.67 | ▲65.67 |
| BN | Syed Ibrahim Kader | 21,468 | 17.75 | ▲2.42 |
| PN | Jimmy Chew Jyh Gang | 18,263 | 15.10 | ▲15.10 |
| Independent | Kuan Chee Heng | 1,793 | 1.48 | ▲1.48 |
| Total valid votes | | 120,949 | 100.00 | |
| Total rejected ballots | | 1,222 | | |
| Unreturned ballots | | 266 | | |
| Turnout | | 122,437 | 79.12 | ▼8.35 |
| Registered electors | | 152,861 | | |
| Majority | | 57,957 | 47.92 | ▼9.14 |
| PH hold | | Swing | | |
Source(s) https://lom.agc.gov.my/ilims/upload/portal/akta/outputp/1753283/PUB612.pdf

Malaysian general election, 2018
| Party | Candidate | Votes | % | ∆% |
|---|---|---|---|---|
| PKR | Gobind Singh Deo | 60,429 | 72.39 | ▲72.39 |
| BN | Ang Chin Tat | 12,794 | 15.33 | ▼17.05 |
| PAS | Mohamad Rosharizan Mohd Rozlan | 10,255 | 12.28 | ▲12.28 |
| Total valid votes | | 83,478 | 100.00 | |
| Total rejected ballots | | 667 | | |
| Unreturned ballots | | 212 | | |
| Turnout | | 84,357 | 87.47 | ▼0.87 |
| Registered electors | | 96,437 | | |
| Majority | | 47,635 | 57.06 | ▲21.82 |
| PKR hold | | Swing | | |
Source(s) "His Majesty's Government Gazette - Notice of Contested Election, Parliament for the State of Selangor [P.U. (B) 239/2018]" (PDF). Attorney General's Chambers of Malaysia. 3 May 2018. Archived from the original (PDF) on 19 July 2019. "Federal Government Gazette - Results of Contested Election and Statements of the Poll after the Official Addition of Votes, Parliamentary Constituencies for the State of Selangor [P.U. (B) 313/2018]" (PDF). Attorney General's Chambers of Malaysia. 28 May 2018. Archived from the original (PDF) on 19 July 2019.

Malaysian general election, 2013
| Party | Candidate | Votes | % | ∆% |
|---|---|---|---|---|
| DAP | Gobind Singh Deo | 62,938 | 67.62 | ▲6.68 |
| BN | Kohilan Pillay Appu | 30,136 | 32.38 | ▼6.68 |
| Total valid votes | | 93,074 | 100.00 | |
| Total rejected ballots | | 1,261 | | |
| Unreturned ballots | | 194 | | |
| Turnout | | 94,529 | 88.34 | ▲9.90 |
| Registered electors | | 107,010 | | |
| Majority | | 32,802 | 35.24 | ▲13.36 |
| DAP hold | | Swing | | |
Source(s) "Federal Government Gazette - Notice of Contested Election, Parliament for the State of Selangor [P.U. (B) 176/2013]" (PDF). Attorney General's Chambers of Malaysia. 26 April 2013. Archived from the original (PDF) on 30 September 2018. "Federal Government Gazette - Results of Contested Election and Statements of the Poll after the Official Addition of Votes, Parliamentary Constituencies for the State of Selangor [P.U. (B) 217/2013]" (PDF). Attorney General's Chambers of Malaysia. 22 May 2013. Archived from the original (PDF) on 30 September 2018.

Malaysian general election, 2008
| Party | Candidate | Votes | % | ∆% |
|---|---|---|---|---|
| DAP | Gobind Singh Deo | 35,079 | 60.94 | ▲27.91 |
| BN | Lau Yeng Peng | 22,486 | 39.06 | ▼14.32 |
| Total valid votes | | 57,565 | 100.00 | |
| Total rejected ballots | | 1,580 | | |
| Unreturned ballots | | 172 | | |
| Turnout | | 59,317 | 78.44 | ▲10.60 |
| Registered electors | | 75,625 | | |
| Majority | | 12,593 | 21.88 | ▼7.91 |
| DAP gain from BN | | Swing | | ? |

Malaysian general election, 2004
| Party | Candidate | Votes | % | ∆% |
|---|---|---|---|---|
| BN | Lau Yeng Peng | 21,291 | 53.38 | ▲53.38 |
| PAS | Azmi Jamion @ Jemingon | 9,409 | 23.59 | ▲23.59 |
| DAP | Wong Choong Yun | 9,185 | 23.03 | ▲23.03 |
| Total valid votes | | 39,885 | 100.00 | |
| Total rejected ballots | | 533 | | |
| Unreturned ballots | | 78 | | |
| Turnout | | 40,496 | 67.84 | |
| Registered electors | | 59,693 | | |
| Majority | | 11,882 | 29.79 | |
| BN gain from DAP | | Swing | | ? |

Malaysian general election, 1990
| Party | Candidate | Votes | % | ∆% |
|---|---|---|---|---|
| DAP | V. David | 34,967 | 51.69 | ▼7.03 |
| BN | Tan Yee Kew | 32,686 | 48.31 | ▲13.86 |
| Total valid votes | | 67,653 | 100.00 | |
| Total rejected ballots | | 1,031 | | |
| Unreturned ballots | | 0 | | |
| Turnout | | 68,684 | 69.57 | ▼5.80 |
| Registered electors | | 98,733 | | |
| Majority | | 2,281 | 3.38 | ▼20.89 |
| DAP hold | | Swing | | |

Malaysian general election, 1986
| Party | Candidate | Votes | % |
|---|---|---|---|
| DAP | V. David | 35,145 | 58.72 |
| BN | Lui Thai Heng | 20,616 | 34.45 |
| PAS | Asri Janang | 2,409 | 4.02 |
| SDP | Yeoh Poh San | 1,684 | 2.81 |
| Total valid votes | | 59,854 | 100.00 |
| Total rejected ballots | | 1,198 | |
| Unreturned ballots | | 0 | |
| Turnout | | 61,052 | 75.37 |
| Registered electors | | 81,005 | |
| Majority | | 14,529 | 24.27 |
This was a new constituency created.
