= Andrew Biswell =

British academic

Andrew Biswell is the biographer of Anthony Burgess. He was made Professor of Modern Literature in the Department of English at Manchester Metropolitan University in June 2013 having previously held the positions of Lecturer, then Principal Lecturer, in English and Creative Writing, and Academic Director of the Manchester Writing School.

Biswell wrote his doctoral thesis on Burgess's fiction and journalism. His biography, semi-authorised by Burgess's widow, is entitled The Real Life of Anthony Burgess. Picador published the book, on 21 October 2005. A paperback version was published on 6 October 2006.

As a student Biswell was editor of the Leicester University Student Union newspaper Ripple between 1993 - 1994.
