= Subramaniam Sinniah =

Former Malaysian politician (1944–2022)

Yang Berbahagia Tan Sri Dato' Subramaniam Sinniah PSM DPMJ DSSA DSNS SMJ PPN
- சி. சுப்ரமணியம்

Deputy President of the Malaysian Indian Congress
- In office 12 October 1979 – June 2006
- Preceded by: Samy Vellu
- Succeeded by: Palanivel Govindasamy

Ministerial roles
- 1974–1978: Parliamentary Secretary of Labour and Manpower
- 1982–: Deputy Minister of Housing and Local Government
- 1991–1995: Parliamentary Secretary of International Trade and Industry
- 1995–2004: Deputy Minister of Domestic Trade and Consumer Affairs

Faction represented in Dewan Rakyat
- 1974–1978: Barisan Nasional
- 1982–2004: Barisan Nasional

Personal details
- Born: Subramaniam s/o Sinniah; 26 October 1944
- Died: 5 July 2022 (aged 77) Petaling Jaya, Selangor, Malaysia
- Party: Malaysian Indian Congress (MIC) (1964–2022)
- Other political affiliations: Barisan Nasional (BN) (1964–2022)

Subramaniam s/o Sinniah (Tamil: சி. சுப்ரமணியம், romanized: Ci. Cupramaṇiyam; 6 October 1944 – 5 July 2022), or S. Subramaniam as he was known to his supporters, was a Malaysian politician of Indian origin who was a member of the Malaysian Indian Congress (MIC), a component party of the ruling Barisan Nasional (BN) coalition. He served as the Deputy President of MIC from October 1979 to June 2006. He was the longest-serving officeholder by serving for 27 years. He served as Deputy Minister of Domestic Trade and Consumer Affairs from 1995 to 2004, Parliamentary Secretary of International Trade and Industry from 1991 to 1995 and Parliamentary Secretary of Labour and Manpower from 1974 to 1978 as well as the Member of Parliament (MP) for Segamat from 1982 to 2004 and Damansara from 1974 to 1982.

== Political history ==
When V. Manickavasagam became president of the Malaysian Indian Congress, he decided to introduce new faces to the party in leadership positions. This was the time when Subramaniam, K. Pathmanaban, a Harvard MBA holder, and several others entered the political arena to infuse new blood into MIC, and Manickavasagam gave them preference. They were young, well-educated and ambitious but lacked grassroots experience.

This made Samy Vellu bitter as he was one of the five leaders who dared defy former president V.T. Sambanthan and propel Manickavasagam to the presidency of the party.

Subramaniam, then the Secretary General of MIC, was hand-picked by Manickavasagam to succeed him; however, Samy Vellu fought back, literally, and in 1977 party elections edged over Subramaniam by a mere 26 votes to become the Deputy President of MIC.

When Manickavasagam died suddenly on 12 October 1979, Samy Vellu became the Acting President. But it was a divided party that Samy Vellu took over, with the rank and file on his side, and much of the Indian intelligentsia backing Subramaniam. In the ensuing years, Samy Vellu worked hard to remake MIC in his image. In 1981, Samy Vellu almost moved to sack Subramaniam, but following a 20-minute private talk with the latter, both came to some form of understanding, and peace prevailed in the party for the next five years.

== Bad blood with Samy Vellu ==
Subramaniam is known for not to be in good terms with MIC's president, Samy Vellu as Subramaniam was dropped as a candidate for the 11th general election by Samy Vellu – three days before nomination day. According to Samy Vellu, Subramaniam has enjoyed his time as a Member of Parliament, parliamentary secretary, and deputy minister, citing "now it was the turn of others to taste such fame."

Subramaniam stood to defend his deputy president post in the 2006 party elections, but Samy Vellu went around campaigning that a vote for Subramaniam was a vote against Samy and that he endorsed Dato' G. Palanivel. In the 2006 party elections, Samy Vellu was eventually returned as president uncontested and Dato' G. Palanivel trumped Subramaniam for the deputy president's post. Samy Vellu's image started to tarnish and he lost ethnic Indian support after Hindu Rights Action Force (HINDRAF) organised a rally on 25 November 2007 in Kuala Lumpur demanding 18 points to prevent further discrimination against ethnic Indians, who had been marginalised for 50 years since the country's independence. As a result of this, Samy Vellu lost the Sungai Siput parliamentary seat.

Only 3 out of 9 MIC candidates for the 12th general election were selected. This was the worst defeat for MIC since the party was formed. However, Samy Vellu claimed that he was not responsible for MIC's loss. According to Australian political analyst, the Indian community did not reject Malaysian Indian congress but only Samy Vellu and his cronies. Many branch members agreed that the next man who can save the party is Dato Subra but the problem arose when the present president is not vacating the post. Many tricky methods and pressure were implied to corrupt Dato Subra's image because this is the only way for Samy Vellu to remain in the post. However, the new generation are educated and broad minded. All the foolish attempts against Dato Subra have been deflected. It is also predicted that Samy Vellu could destroy MIC and lead the Indians into his slavery. According to some political analyst a shift of power will take place soon and Dato Subra will bring a fresh air for Indians. Resignation of MIC youth chief S.A. Vickneswaran is another blow for Samy Vellu. Dato Subra started a blog to communicate with all Indians from all backgrounds. The blog can be found on https://web.archive.org/web/20090817134714/http://datosubra.com/. For 2009 MIC deputy presidency election likely to be held on 12 September and it is a three corner fight between Dato' Subra, Palanivelu and Sothinathan. Some political analyst believe that Sothinathan was planted by Samy Velu to split Dato Subra vote and gain easy win for Palanivel. Dato Palanivel won the deputy post for the second time with a narrow majority.

== Maika controversy ==
Officials said about 900 shareholders including Subramaniam, Samy Vellu and Democratic Action Party member of Parliament M. Kulasegaran attended the Maika (MIC's debt-ridden investment arm) annual general meeting, the first time that such a huge number had turned up in the company's history. Abdul Rashid, the CEO of Maika had a tough time controlling the crowd. One faction aligned with MIC president Samy Vellu and the other with Subramaniam, shouting at each other. Despite the heated exchanges, the meeting went on smoothly, with Abdul Rashid replying to the questions put forward by the various shareholders including DAP's Ipoh Barat MP M. Kulasegaran. At about 1pm, the shareholders were asked to vote on the various resolutions including one calling for the sale of the insurance company Oriental Capital Assurance Berhad (OCAB) for RM129.8 million.

Maika's management claimed that the sale of OCAB would enable the company to clear its outstanding debts and repay the shareholders who wanted to withdraw their investments. Speaking to reporters later, Subramaniam said he was pushed when he tried to put forward a suggestion at the meeting. He said he was not opposed to the sale of OCAB but Maika should give the first option to an Indian community-linked company or cooperative so that its majority stake would remain in the community's hands. Subramaniam then lodged a police report.

== Declining health and death ==
On 5 July 2022, Subramaniam died at 8 pm night at the age of 77 leaving behind his wife Suganthi Guru@Tina Subramaniam, two sons and a daughter. His funeral service was held two days later on 7 July 2022 at his family home in Petaling Jaya, Selangor. According to his son Sunther, Subramaniam died peacefully in his sleep after having been bedridden for 11 years of declining health after suffering a stroke.

== Election results ==
Parliament of Malaysia
Year	Constituency	Candidate	Votes	Pct	Opponent(s)	Votes	Pct	Ballots cast	Majority	Turnout
1974	P086 Damansara	Subramaniam Sinniah (MIC)	9,763	51.22%	Hor Cheok Foon (DAP)	5,362	28.13%	19,571	4,401	59.19%
1974	P086 Damansara	Subramaniam Sinniah (MIC)	9,763	51.22%	K. C. Cheah (PEKEMAS)	3,935	20.65%	19,571	4,401	59.19%
1978	P086 Damansara	Subramaniam Sinniah (MIC)	18,239	40.31%	V. David (DAP)	21,461	47.43%	45,584	3,222	67.75%
1978	P086 Damansara	Subramaniam Sinniah (MIC)	18,239	40.31%	Syed Ibrahim Syed Abdul Rahman (PAS)	5,386	11.90%	45,584	3,222	67.75%
1978	P086 Damansara	Subramaniam Sinniah (MIC)	18,239	40.31%	Thinakaran Rajakannu (PEKEMAS)	161	0.36%	45,584	3,222	67.75%
1982	P100 Segamat	Subramaniam Sinniah (MIC)	20,932	66.37%	Tan Tien Lim (DAP)	9,925	31.47%	32,845	11,007	79.58%
1982	P100 Segamat	Subramaniam Sinniah (MIC)	20,932	66.37%	Hee Moi @ Hooi Kai (IND)	683	2.17%	32,845	11,007	79.58%
1986	P115 Segamat	Subramaniam Sinniah (MIC)	18,644	59.13%	Chan Yiek Nung (DAP)	12,115	38.42%	32,450	6,529	73.74%
1986	P115 Segamat	Subramaniam Sinniah (MIC)	18,644	59.13%	Abdul Razak Daud (PAS)	771	2.45%	32,450	6,529	73.74%
1990	P115 Segamat	Subramaniam Sinniah (MIC)	20,070	53.35%	Simon Tong Tiam Hock (DAP)	17,549	46.65%	38,775	2,521	73.68%
1995	P125 Segamat	Subramaniam Sinniah (MIC)	28,710	70.72%	Yaakob Jantan (DAP)	11,143	27.45%	42,031	17,567	72.75%
1995	P125 Segamat	Subramaniam Sinniah (MIC)	28,710	70.72%	Lim Wah Kin (IND)	741	1.83%	42,031	17,567	72.75%
1999	P125 Segamat	Subramaniam Sinniah (MIC)	26,350	62.34%	Tee Gey Yan (DAP)	15,921	37.66%	43,566	10,429	71.67%

== Honours ==
=== Honours of Malaysia ===
- Malaysia
  - Medal of the Order of the Defender of the Realm (PPN) (1981)
  - Commander of the Order of Loyalty to the Crown of Malaysia (PSM) – Tan Sri (2012)
- Johor
  - Companion of the Order of the Crown of Johor (SMJ) (1983)
  - Knight Commander of the Order of the Crown of Johor (DPMJ) – Dato' (1989)
- Negeri Sembilan
  - Knight Companion of the Order of Loyalty to Negeri Sembilan (DSNS) – Dato' (1985)
- Selangor
  - Knight Companion of the Order of Sultan Salahuddin Abdul Aziz Shah (DSSA) – Dato' (1993)
