= Damansara (Kuala Lumpur federal constituency) =

Federal constituency in Kuala Lumpur, Malaysia

the Federal Territories of Malaysia constituency

Defunct federal constituency
- Legislature: Dewan Rakyat
- Constituency created: 1974
- Constituency abolished: 1986
- First contested: 1974
- Last contested: 1982

Damansara was a federal constituency in the Federal Territories, Malaysia, that was represented in the Dewan Rakyat from 1974 to 1986.

The federal constituency was created in the 1974 redistribution and was mandated to return a single member to the Dewan Rakyat under the first past the post voting system.

== History ==
=== Representation history ===
Members of Parliament for Damansara
Parliament	No	Years	Member	Party	Vote Share
Constituency created from Bangsar and Batu
4th	P086	1974-1978	Subramaniam Sinniah (சி. சுப்ரமணியம்)	BN (MIC)	9,763; 51.22%
5th	P086	1978-1982	V. David (வே. தேவிட்)	DAP	21,461; 47.43%
6th	P086	1982-1986	Tan Koon Swan (陈群川)	BN (MCA)	34,659; 59.43%
Constituency abolished, split into Kepong, Lembah Pantai and Seputeh

=== Historical boundaries ===
Federal constituency	Area
Federal constituency	1974
Damansara	Brickfields; Kampung Kasipillay; Kampung Kerinchi; Segambut; Sungai Penchala

== Election results ==
Malaysian general election, 1982
Party	Candidate	Votes	%	∆%
BN	Tan Koon Swan	34,659	59.43	▲19.12
DAP	V. David	20,137	34.53	▼12.90
PAS	Ramli Mohamed Yasin	3,527	6.05	▼5.85
Total valid votes		58,323	100.00	
Total rejected ballots		449		
Unreturned ballots		0		
Turnout		58,772	67.88	▲0.13
Registered electors		86,576		
Majority		14,522	24.90	▲17.78
BN gain from DAP		Swing		?

Malaysian general election, 1978
Party	Candidate	Votes	%	∆%
DAP	V. David	21,461	47.43	▲19.30
BN	Subramaniam Sinniah	18,239	40.31	▼10.91
PAS	Syed Ibrahim Syed Abdul Rahman	5,386	11.90	▲11.90
PEKEMAS	Thinakaran Rajakannu	161	0.36	▼20.29
Total valid votes		45,247	100.00	
Total rejected ballots		337		
Unreturned ballots		0		
Turnout		45,584	67.75	▲8.56
Registered electors		67,278		
Majority		3,222	7.12	▼15.97
DAP gain from BN		Swing		?

Malaysian general election, 1974
Party	Candidate	Votes	%
BN	Subramaniam Sinniah	9,763	51.22
DAP	Hor Cheok Foon	5,362	28.13
PEKEMAS	K. C. Cheah	3,935	20.65
Total valid votes		19,060	100.00
Total rejected ballots		0	
Unreturned ballots		0	
Turnout		19,571	59.19
Registered electors		38,028	
Majority		4,401	23.09
This was a new constituency created.
