= People's Progressive Party (Malaysia) =

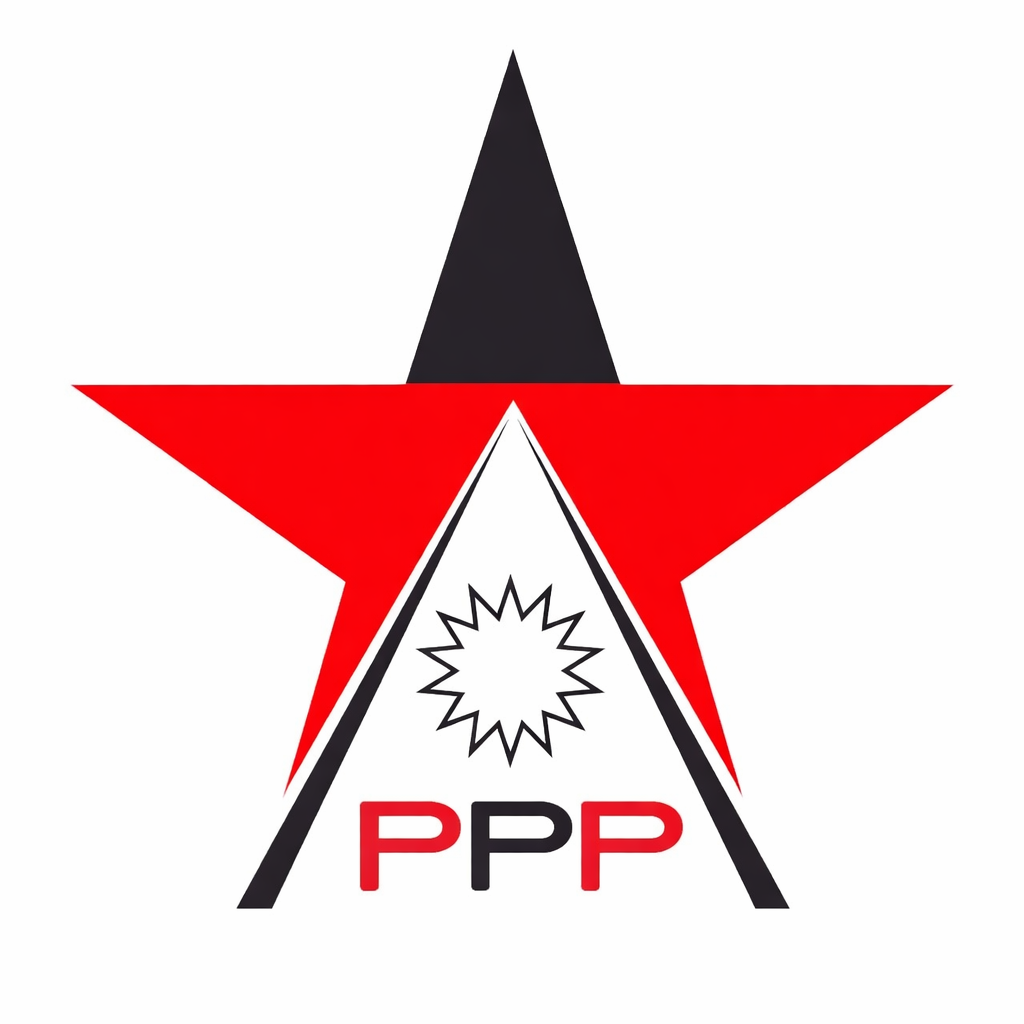
- Malay name: Parti Progresif Penduduk ڤرتي ڤروڬريسيف ڤندودوق
- Chinese name: 人民進步黨 人民进步党 rénmín jìnbù dǎng
- Abbreviation: myPPP, PPP
- President: Loga Bala Mohan
- Secretary-General: Inder Singh
- Vice President: Datuk Mohan Kandasamy; Dato Elayppen Muthusamy; Datuk Lee Heng
- Women's Chief: Punitha Munusamy
- Youth Chief: Sathiah Sudakaran
- Founder: S. Kanapathipillai; D. R. Seenivasagam
- Founded: 10 April 1953; 19 April 2023 re-registered
- Dissolved: 14 January 2019
- Preceded by: Perak Progressive Party
- Headquarters: Wisma PPP 74, Jalan Rotan, Kampung Attap, 50460 Kuala Lumpur, Malaysia
- Youth wing: PPP Pemuda Movement
- Women's wing: PPP Women's Movement
- Men's youth wing: PPP Putera Movement
- Women's youth wing: PPP Puteri Movement
- Membership (2024): 320,000
- Ideology: Liberal conservatism Civic nationalism
- Political position: Centre-right; Historical: Centre-left
- National affiliation: Barisan Nasional (1973–2018, since 2025){{refn|group=nb|The party was formerly part of Alliance (1953–1955), Malaysian Solidarity Convention (1965), and United Front (1966) and was aligned with Alliance (1972–1973). Through BN it is aligned with Gabungan Parti Sarawak and Gabungan Rakyat Sabah (since 2025)}} National Unity Government (since 2023)
- Colours: Gold
- Slogan: "Peace, Progressive, Prosperity"

Website
- www.ppphq.online

The People's Progressive Party (myPPP, PPP; Malay: Parti Progresif Penduduk), formerly known as the Perak Progressive Party, is a political party in Malaysia.

Founded in 1953, the party adopted its current name in 1956. It was a member of the Alliance from 1954 to 1955, and again from 1972 until it was replaced by Barisan Nasional in 1974, remaining a member until 2018.

Following the 2018 general election, the party suffered a split and was de-registered in 2019. It was re-registered in 2023 and rejoined Barisan Nasional in November 2025.

== History ==
PPP was formed in 1953 as the Perak Progressive Party by the Seenivasagam brothers mainly as an opposition party to the Alliance; the party's first president was S. Kanapathipillai with the Seenivasagam brothers as senior office bearers. It was a hugely popular party upon inception, particularly due to the popularity of the brothers who spoke up for justice, equality and the common man.

For a short period in 1954, PPP joined the ruling Alliance with UMNO, MIC, and MCA (which would later become the Barisan Nasional), but withdrew in 1955 over disagreement with the Alliance on allocation of seats, to become an opposition party again. In 1956, it changed its name to the People's Progressive Party. In 1969, as a strong opposition party, PPP was nearly able to form the Perak State Government, but fell short of just 2 seats in combination with the opposition to form the state assembly when 2 of its members crossed over. The success of PPP was mainly due to the Chinese vote, though many of the top leaders then were Indians.

In 1974, PPP became one of the founding members of the Barisan Nasional, succeeding the Alliance, which it had rejoined in 1972. It was brought into the alliance to keep the Indian and Chinese vote, especially after the 1969 racial riots.

However, joining the coalition would prove its undoing as it lost nearly all its seats when it contested under the Barisan Nasional ticket in the 1974 General Elections. This was mainly due to Chinese anti-establishment feeling that was prevailing at that time. Many PPP stalwarts transferred their allegiance to the DAP during that time.

Following the loss of its final parliamentary seat in 1978, the party descended into factionalism and was on the verge of disbanding.

However PPP enjoyed a renaissance of sorts under the leadership of M. Kayveas.

He rebranded the party and claimed to have boosted its membership to more than 500,000 with a network of over 3000 branches throughout the country. All registered members carry a membership card signed by the President; the President's card is signed by the Secretary General. As of 2006, 48% of the PPP's membership was Indian, 32% Chinese, 13% Malay, and the rest were of other ethnicities.

In November 2006, party president, M. Kayveas, proposed a merger between the PPP and another Barisan Nasional party, the Parti Gerakan Rakyat Malaysia. Koh Tsu Koon, Gerakan's Deputy President, welcomed the suggestion, but ultimately nothing came out of it.

The 2008 elections saw the party being decimated. However the party retained its representation in the Senate and was later allocated a Deputy Minister post occupied by T. Murugiah.

In the aftermath of the 2018 elections, the party under President M. Kayveas announced PPP's exit from the Barisan Nasional coalition after its loss of power in the election. There was a subsequent power struggle between the "remain" and "leave" factions of PPP led by Maglin Dennis D'Cruz and M. Kayveas respectively. The party was subsequently de-registered by the Registrar of Soceities (ROS) as a result.

The party was re-registered in 2023 following a successful appeal and Maglin's election as president by the party's supreme council was recognised by the Home Ministry.

Maglin however died on November the same year, and Loga Bala Mohan became acting president Loga Bala was subsequently confirmed as the president of the party when he won the post uncontested in the party's annual general assembly on 1 September 2024.

== Chronology ==
- 1953: PPP was formed under the name 'Perak Progressive Party' to participate in the political future of the impending independence of Malaya.
- 1954: PPP became a component of the Alliance. It won a seat in the Ipoh Town Council.
- 1955: PPP withdrew from the Alliance before the 1955 Federal Legislative Council Elections due to non-allocation of seats for PPP.
- 1956: To reflect a national image, the party's name was changed to People's Progressive Party.
- 1957: Party president, D. R. Seenivasagam won the by-election for the Ipoh Parliamentary seat and became PPP's first Member of Parliament.
- 1959: PPP won 4 parliamentary and 8 state assembly seats in the 1959 general election.
- 1960: PPP won 1 more Parliamentary seat making it 5 MPs in parliament. PPP consolidated its position in Ipoh and turned Ipoh Municipality into an exemplary model of local administration.
- 1964: PPP won 2 parliamentary and 6 state seats in the 1964 general election.
- 1969: Party president and prime mover, D. R. Seenivasagam, died, and the leadership of the party was taken over by co-founder S. P. Seenivasagam. Despite the change of leadership, PPP went on to win 4 parliamentary seats and 12 state assembly seats in the 1969 General Election. The opportunity to form the Perak State Government slipped away due to a shortage of 2 seats.
- 1972: PPP charted a new milestone by making a decision to join the Barisan Nasional. The decision was based on the belief that for the country to achieve political, social and economic stability, parochial and narrow party interests must be given up for a national multi racial outlook.
- 1974: PPP contested under Barisan Nasional symbol and won 1 parliamentary and 2 state seats in the 1974 general election.
- 1975: Party president S. P. Seenivasagam died and Mr. Khong Kok Yet became president.
- 1978: S. I. Rajah was elected president.
- 1982: Paramjit Singh was elected president.
- 1985: Tee Ah Chuan took over the party presidency after Paramjit Singh stepped down.
- 1986: Paramjit Singh became president again following the resignation of Tee Ah Chuan.
- 1988: Mak Hon Kam became president after a private deal with Paramjit Singh. Following a court injunction against Mak Hon Kam, S. I. Rajah became Acting President. The court subsequently decided that the Registrar of Societies should determine a legitimate leader.
- 1993: M. Kayveas became president following S. I. Rajah's retirement from active politics.
- 1994: The Registrar of Societies decided and recognised M. Kayveas as the lawful president.
- 1995
  - 19 March: An Extraordinary Delegates Conference was held and the following were unanimously adopted:
    - The party Logo, which is a six pointed red star, be changed to a six pointed blue star with the letters PPP in the center of the star.
    - The national president is the only spokesman for the party.
    - Branch membership to be reduced to 27 from the current number of 50.
    - To update the Registry of members and Membership Cards be issued and ensure active membership participation.
  - 26 March: M. Kayveas attended the First Barisan Nasional Convention and signed the Barisan Nasional Charter as the National President of PPP.
  - 12 April: Prime Minister and Barisan Nasional chairman launched the new logo of PPP.
  - 25 April: PPP actively participated in the General Election extending their fullest support to all Barisan Nasional candidates.
  - 5 June: The Registrar of Societies was sued for having made a decision in favour of M. Kayveas.
  - 5 October: The court accepted M. Kayveas and his CEC to intervene in the suit.
  - 21 October: The Registrar of Societies confirmed that until further notice of its decision, M. Kayveas and his CEC should remain the only legal office bearers of the party.
- 1999
  - 18 September: An attempt was made by a group of expelled members to challenge the leadership of PPP via a ruling from the Seremban High Court. It was subsequently nullified on 14 October 1999 by the Court of Appeal which decided in favour of M. Kayveas' leadership of the PPP.
- 2000
  - 14 October : Dato Seri Dr Mahathir launched the new PPP Logo to replace the six pointed blue star with the letters PPP in the center of the star.
  - 6 December: As promised by the then Prime Minister Tun Dr. Mahathir Mohamad, M. Kayveas was appointed Senator in the Dewan Negara.
- 2001
  - 30 January: Appointment of the party President as a Deputy Minister in the Ministry of Housing and Local Government.
  - 27 May: A 25-acre (100,000 m^{2}) land was donated to PPP by Hua Yang Development Sdn Bhd for the purpose of setting up an Institution of Higher Learning. The signing ceremony was held in the Ipoh City and Country Club.
- 2005
  - 24 September: Kayveas retained his position unopposed after only one nomination was submitted for the president's post.
- 2008
  - March: Kayveas lost his federal seat. PPP's future was widely questioned.
- 2009
  - 4 April: Opposition Leader Anwar Ibrahim announced that People's Progressive Party (PPP) vice-president V. Nagarajan along with 11 of the party's divisions would be defecting to People's Justice Party.
- 2009
  - 25 June: Kayveas announced his new line for the supreme council for the term 2009–2014. He also appointed three vice-presidents: Loga Bala, M. Gandi, and Nik Safiea; Treasurer Ghana; and Information Chief A. Chandrakumanan from the Federal Territory.
- 2009
  - Kayveas announced new Youth Chief Jamal Gulhamhan and Putera Chief R. Suthesan from Johor.
- 2009
  - 12 August: M. Kayveas was the valid People's Progressive Party president while sacked youth chief T. Murugiah's appointment as president at a 24 May Emergency General Meeting (EGM) was invalid, the Registrar of Societies (ROS) had decided. Murugiah's sacking had also been found to have been conducted according to provisions in the party constitution and was therefore deemed valid.
- 2014 PPP got more Counselor posts in local government and 2 Senator Post with 1 Deputy Minister.
- 2014
  - 30 November: M. Kayveas announced his new line for the supreme council for the term 2014-2019 who have won uncontested. Five vice-presidents won uncontested Loga Bala Mohan, A. Chandrakumanan, Maglin Dennis D'Cruz, Ong and Eleyappan.
- 2015
  - 15 November: M. Kayveas announced rebranding of Party from PPP to My PPP (#myPPP) with new tagline "Proud to be a Malaysian (#P2baM).
- 2018
  - 25 April: M. Kayveas was expelled from myPPP. He lost his party membership and all positions in the party.
  - 26 May: An AGM was organised at Putra World Trade Center with Datuk Seri Maglin Dennis D’Cruz being appointed as President, Datuk Loga Bala Mohan Jeganathan being appointed as Senior Vice President and Datuk Dr Siva Kumar being appointed as Vice President. Maglin decided that the party had always remained in Barisan Nasional while M. Kayveas disputed his ouster as illegal and instigated by UMNO and announced that the party pulled out of BN.
  - 27 May: Another AGM was held by M. Kayveas, who at the general meeting displayed a letter issued on 18 May by the Registrar of Societies acknowledging him as the legitimate myPPP President. He claimed that he had about 6,000 signatures from supporters nationwide who supported his presidency.
- 2019
  - 14 Jan: The Registrar of Societies (RoS) has deregistered MyPPP, both factions in dispute were informed. Party has 30 days to appeal.
- 2023
- 19 April 2023. MyPPP has been re-registered by the Ministry of Home Affairs. The party has successfully won 21 cases against the former president. The responsibility of party building will now be handed over to genuine myPPP members.
- 2025
  - 25 November: Party readmitted into BN.

== List of party presidents ==
Order	Name	Term of office		Years
1	S. Kanapathipillai	1953	1964	11
2	D. R. Seenivasagam	1964	1969	5
3	S. P. Seenivasagam	1969	1975	6
4	Khong Kok Yat	1975	1978	3
5	S. I. Rajah	1978	1982	4
6	Paramjit Singh	1982	1985	3
7	Tee Ah Chuan	1985	1986	1
(6)	Paramjit Singh	1986	1988	2
8	Mak Hon Kam	1988	1988	>1
(5)	S. I. Rajah	1988	1993	5
9	M. Kayveas	1993	2018	25
10	Maglin Dennis D'Cruz	2018	2019	<1
Party de-registered (2019-2023)
Party re-registered (2023-current)
(10)	Maglin Dennis D'Cruz	2023	2023	<1
11	Loga Bala Mohan	2024	Incumbent	

== Government positions ==
=== State governments ===
- Perak (1972–1982, 1986–1990, 2010–2013)

Note: bold as Menteri Besar/Chief Minister, italic as junior partner

== General election results ==
Election	Total seats won	Total votes	Share of votes	Outcome of election	Election leader
1955	0 / 144	1,081	0.1%	; No representation in Parliament	D. R. Seenivasagam
1959	4 / 144	97,391	6.3%	▲4 seats; Opposition	D. R. Seenivasagam
1964	2 / 144	69,898	3.4%	▼2 seats; Opposition	D. R. Seenivasagam
1969	4 / 144	80,756	3.4%	▲2 seats; Opposition, later Governing coalition (Alliance Party)	S. P. Seenivasagam
1974	1 / 144			▼3 seats; Governing coalition (Barisan Nasional)	S. P. Seenivasagam
1978	0 / 154			▼1 seat; No representation in Parliament	S. I. Rajah
1982	0 / 154			; No representation in Parliament	Paramjit Singh
1986	0 / 177			; No representation in Parliament	Paramjit Singh
1990	0 / 180			; No representation in Parliament	S. I. Rajah
1995	0 / 192			; No representation in Parliament	M. Kayveas
1999	0 / 193			; No representation in Parliament	M. Kayveas
2004	1 / 219			▲1 seat; Governing coalition (Barisan Nasional)	M. Kayveas
2008	0 / 222	16,800	0.21%	▼1 seat; No representation in Parliament	M. Kayveas
2013	0 / 222	7,530	0.07%	; No representation in Parliament	M. Kayveas
2018	0 / 222	7,422	0.06%	; No representation in Parliament	disputed

== State election results ==
State assembly	Election	Votes	%	Seats	Won/contested	+/–	Position (Note: As part of electoral coalition.)	Status
Perlis	2022	Did not contest						No seats
Kedah	2023	Did not contest						No seats
Kelantan	2023	Did not contest						No seats
Terengganu	2023	Did not contest						No seats
Penang	2023	Did not contest						No seats
Perak	2022	Did not contest						No seats
Pahang	2022	Did not contest						No seats
Selangor	2023	Did not contest						No seats
Negeri Sembilan	2026	Did not contest						No seats
Malacca	2026	Did not contest						No seats
Johor	2026	Did not contest						No seats
Sabah	2025	Did not contest						No seats
Sarawak	2021	Did not contest						No seats

Note

State election	State Legislative Assembly						
State election	Kelantan	Penang	Perak	Selangor	Negeri Sembilan	Malacca	Total won / Total contested
2/3 majority	2 / 3	2 / 3	2 / 3	2 / 3	2 / 3	2 / 3	
1955			0 / 19				0 / 2
1959		0 / 24	8 / 40	0 / 28			8 / 39
1964		0 / 24	5 / 40	0 / 28	0 / 24		5 / 26
1969		0 / 24	12 / 40				12 / 16
1974			2 / 42				2 / 9
1978			1 / 42				1 / 4
1982			0 / 42				0 / 3
1986			1 / 46				1 / 3
2004			0 / 59				0 / 1
2008			0 / 59				0 / 1
2013	0 / 45		0 / 59	0 / 56		0 / 28	0 / 4

== Elected representatives ==
List of MPs

1959

P27 Ipoh D.R. Seenivasagam

P28 Menglembu S.P. Seenivasagam

P30 Ulu Kinta Chan Swee Ho

P31 Batu Gajah Khong Kok Yat

1964

P50 Ipoh D.R. Seenivasagam

P51 Menglembu S.P. Seenivasagam

1969

P48 Bruas Su Liang Yu

P50 Ipoh R. C. Mahadeva Rayan

P51 Menglembu S.P. Seenivasagam

P30 Ulu Kinta Chan Yoon Om

1974

P56 Bruas Su Liang Yu

2004

P60 Taiping M Kayveas

List of state assemblymen

1959

N21 Sungei Raia Chin Foon

N22 Chemor Teoh Kim Swee

N23 Pekan Lama Toh Seang Eng

N24 Pekan Bharu D. R. Seenivasagam

N25 Pasir Puteh Mohamed Fajar Ali Hassan

N26 Kuala Pari S. P. Seenivasagam

N27 Pusing Khong Kok Yat

N29 Gopeng Hor Hock Lung

1964

N23 Pekan Lama D. R. Seenivasagam

N24 Pekan Bharu Chan Swee Ho

N25 Pasir Puteh Fong Kuan See

N26 Kuala Pari S. P. Seenivasagam

N27 Pusing Khong Kok Yat

1969

N16 Jalong R. C. Mahadeva Rayan

N21 Sungei Raia Samsudin Harun

N22 Chemor Theam Moi Tuck

N23 Pekan Lama Khong Kok Yat

N24 Pekan Bharu Chan Yoon Onn

N25 Pasir Puteh Foo Kuan Sze

N26 Kuala Pari S. P. Seenivasagam

N27 Pusing Yap Boon En

N29 Gopeng J. R. Suppiah

N33 Pasir Bedamar K. Ramasamy

N39 Bidor Chin Kee Seong

1974

N19 Chemor Yap Boon En BN (PPP)

N39 Bidor Chin Kee Seong BN (PPP)

1978

N19 Chemor Yap Boon En BN (PPP)

1986

N18 Sungai Rokam Paramjit Singh Tara Singh BN (PPP)

== Notes and references ==
=== Other references ===
- Pillai, M.G.G. (3 November 2005). "National Front parties were not formed to fight for Malaysian independence". Malaysia Today.
