= Wong Nai Chee =

Malaysian politician

Yang Berbahagia Datuk Wong Nai Chee DPSM JP
- 王乃志

Member of the Malaysian Parliament for Kota Melaka
- In office 21 March 2004 – 8 March 2008
- Preceded by: Kerk Kim Hock (DAP)
- Succeeded by: Sim Tong Him (PR–DAP)
- Majority: 219 (2004)

Personal details
- Born: 1 January 1969 (age 57)
- Party: Malaysian Chinese Association (MCA)
- Other political affiliations: Barisan Nasional (BN)
- Education: University of Hull (LLB)
- Occupation: Politician
- Profession: Lawyer

Wong Nai Chee (1 January 1969) is a Malaysian politician who served as Member of Parliament (MP) for Kota Melaka from March 2004 to March 2008. He is a member of Malaysian Chinese Association (MCA), a component party of Barisan Nasional (BN).

== Career ==
Wong Nai Chee was first elected as an MP for Kota Melaka in the 2004 general election after defeating then-DAP Secretary-general Kerk Kim Hock by 219 votes. He failed to be reelected in the 2008 general election, losing to Sim Tong Him from DAP. He was appointed Political Secretary to Prime Minister Najib Razak. Wong Nai Chee was not renominated to a contest in 2013 general election by MCA. In 2018 general election, he attempted a comeback by contest in Alor Gajah seat, but was defeated by Mohd Redzuan Md Yusof from BERSATU by 6,980 votes.

== Election results ==
Parliament of Malaysia
Year	Constituency	Candidate	Votes	Pct	Opponent(s)	Votes	Pct	Ballots cast	Majority	Turnout
2004	P138 Kota Melaka	Wong Nai Chee (MCA)	31,217	50.18%	Kerk Kim Hock (DAP)	30,998	49.82%	64,391	219	77.78%
2008	P138 Kota Melaka	Wong Nai Chee (MCA)	27,250	41.36%	Sim Tong Him (DAP)	38,640	58.64%	67,479	11,390	79.57%
2018	P135 Alor Gajah	Wong Nai Chee (MCA)	22,350	38.66%	Mohd Redzuan Md Yusof (BERSATU)	29,330	50.73%	59,000	6,980	83.85%
2018	P135 Alor Gajah	Wong Nai Chee (MCA)	22,350	38.66%	Mohammad Nazree Mohammad Aris (PAS)	6,135	10.61%	59,000	6,980	83.85%

== Honours ==
- Malacca
  - Companion Class II of the Exalted Order of Malacca (DPSM) – Datuk (2015)
  - Justice of the Peace (JP) (2025)
