= Kerk Kim Hock =

Malaysian politician

- 郭金福

4th Secretary-General of the Democratic Action Party
- In office 3 December 1999 – 28 March 2004
- National Chairman: Lim Kit Siang
- Preceded by: Lim Kit Siang
- Succeeded by: Lim Guan Eng

Member of the Malaysian Parliament for Kota Melaka
- In office 29 November 1999 – 21 March 2004
- Preceded by: Lim Guan Eng
- Succeeded by: Wong Nai Chee
- Majority: 9,389 (1999)

Member of the Malaysian Parliament for Pasir Pinji
- In office 20 October 1990 – 29 November 1999
- Preceded by: Lau Dak Kee
- Succeeded by: Position abolished
- Majority: 17,953 (1990)

Member of the Malacca State Legislative Assembly for Durian Daun
- In office 3 August 1986 – 20 October 1990
- Preceded by: Unknown
- Succeeded by: Jew Kok Kee
- Majority: 4,808 (1986)

Personal details
- Born: Kerk Kim Hock; 29 July 1956 Malacca, Federation of Malaya (now Malaysia)
- Died: 9 August 2017 (aged 61) Malacca, Malaysia
- Citizenship: Malaysian
- Party: Democratic Action Party (DAP)
- Other political affiliations: Barisan Alternatif (BA); Gagasan Rakyat (GR)
- Spouse: Mook Kwai Mei
- Children: Kerk Chee Yee (son); Kerk Chee Wan (daughter)
- Occupation: Politician
- Profession: Mechanical engineer

Kerk Kim Hock (Chinese: 郭金福; pinyin: Guō Jīnfú; Jyutping: Gwok3 Gam1 Fuk1; Pe̍h-ōe-jī: Keh Kim-hok; 29 July 1956 – 9 August 2017) was a Malaysian politician and mechanical engineer who served as Member of Parliament (MP) for Kota Melaka from December 1999 to March 2004 and Pasir Panji from October 1990 to December 1999. He served as Member of the Malacca State Legislative Assembly (MLA) for Durian Daun from August 1986 to October 1990. He also served as the 4th Secretary-General of the Democratic Action Party (DAP) from December 1999 to his retirement from politics in March 2004. Kerk's retirement coincided with the DAP leaving the Barisan Alternatif opposition coalition that the party had co-founded in 1998. He was also the father of Kerk Chee Yee, the Deputy Speaker of the Malacca State Legislative Assembly and MLA for Ayer Keroh.

== Political career ==
He was elected in 1986 as the state assemblyman for Durian Daun, Malacca. In 1987, he was detained for 60 days without trial under the Internal Security Act 1960 (ISA) as part of Operasi Lalang, a government sponsored crackdown that saw the arrest of many people, including activists, intellectuals and opposition politicians. In 1990 he was elected as an MP for Pasir Pinji, Perak but in 1995 he lost the Ipoh Timor parliamentary seat by a slim 292 vote majority. Kerk won the Kota Melaka, Malacca parliamentary seat in 1999 later but lost it in the 2004 general election by a slim 219 vote majority again. He then officially retired from Malaysian politics on 28 March 2004.

== Personal life ==
Kerk was married to Mook Kwai Mei and the couple has two children; a son and a daughter. Kerk's son, Kerk Chee Yee has followed his footstep to join politics was elected as state assemblyman for the Ayer Keroh seat in the 2018 Malaysian general election (GE14). He served in the state executive council as Communications, Multimedia, NGO, Youth and Sports Committee chairman from 16 May 2018 until 2 March 2020 during the political crisis.

== Health and death ==
He was diagnosed with Stage II rectal cancer in 2002. After 5 years of battle with cancer, he was announced cancer-free on 25 May 2007. But in 2015, he was diagnosed again with cancer.

Kerk died at 6.10 pm on 9 August 2017 at the age of 61 at his home in Taman Kenanga Seksyen 3, Melaka Tengah District of deep vein thrombosis (DVT) from surgery complications three days after slipping into a coma.

== Election results ==
Malacca State Legislative Assembly
| Year | Constituency | Candidate | Votes | Pct | Opponent(s) | Votes | Pct | Ballots cast | Majority | Turnout |
|---|---|---|---|---|---|---|---|---|---|---|
| 1986 | N15 Durian Daun | Kerk Kim Hock (DAP) | 7,842 | 68.56% | Lai See Liong (MCA) | 3,034 | 26.51% | 11,438 | 4,808 | 73.84% |
| 1986 | N15 Durian Daun | Kerk Kim Hock (DAP) | 7,842 | 68.56% | Low Kim Seng (PPPM) | 111 | 0.97% | 11,438 | 4,808 | 73.84% |
| 1986 | N15 Durian Daun | Kerk Kim Hock (DAP) | 7,842 | 68.56% | Yong Wee Yook @ Yong Wee Ngok (IND) | 215 | 1.88% | 11,438 | 4,808 | 73.84% |

Parliament of Malaysia
| Year | Constituency | Candidate | Votes | Pct | Opponent(s) | Votes | Pct | Ballots cast | Majority | Turnout |
|---|---|---|---|---|---|---|---|---|---|---|
| 1990 | P058 Pasir Pinji | Kerk Kim Hock (DAP) | 31,643 | 69.80% | Chew Wai Khoon (MCA) | 13,690 | 30.20% | 46,115 | 17,953 | 67.27% |
| 1995 | P061 Ipoh Timor | Kerk Kim Hock (DAP) | 23,837 | 49.70% | Chang Kon You @ Chen Kwan Wu (MCA) | 24,129 | 50.30% | 49,233 | 292 | 66.68% |
| 1999 | P123 Kota Melaka | Kerk Kim Hock (DAP) | 33,472 | 58.16% | Lim Swee Kiang (MCA) | 24,083 | 41.84% | 58,921 | 9,389 | 77.15% |
| 2004 | P138 Kota Melaka | Kerk Kim Hock (DAP) | 30,998 | 49.82% | Wong Nai Chee (MCA) | 31,217 | 50.18% | 64,391 | 219 | 77.78% |

Party political offices
| Preceded by Lim Kit Siang | 4th Secretary-General of the DAP; 1999-2004 | Succeeded by Lim Guan Eng |
