= Khoo Poay Tiong =

Malaysian politician

Yang Berhormat Tuan Khoo Poay Tiong MP
- 邱培栋

Chairman of the Secretariat of the Malaysian Chinese New Village Division
- Incumbent
- Assumed office 15 May 2024
- Minister: Nga Kor Ming
- Preceded by: Wong Kah Woh

Member of the Malaysian Parliament for Kota Melaka
- Incumbent
- Assumed office 9 May 2018
- Preceded by: Sim Tong Him (PR–DAP)
- Majority: 49,175 (2018); 46,420 (2022)

Member of the Malacca State Legislative Assembly for Ayer Keroh
- In office 8 March 2008 – 9 May 2018
- Preceded by: Seah Kwi Tong (BN–MCA)
- Succeeded by: Kerk Chee Yee (PH–DAP)
- Majority: 3,205 (2008); 7,943 (2013)

State Leader of the Opposition of Malacca
- In office 1 July 2013 – 9 May 2018
- Governor: Mohd Khalil Yaakob
- Chief Minister: Idris Haron
- Preceded by: Goh Leong San
- Succeeded by: Idris Haron
- Constituency: Ayer Keroh

National Organising Secretary of the Democratic Action Party
- Incumbent
- Assumed office 16 March 2025
- Assistant: Lee Chin Chen; Tan Hong Pin
- Secretary-General: Anthony Loke Siew Fook
- Preceded by: Steven Sim Chee Keong

Assistant National Organising Secretary of the Democratic Action Party
- In office 12 November 2017 – 16 March 2025 Serving with Thomas Su Keong Siong (2017–2022) & Ng Suee Lim (2022–2025)
- Secretary-General: Lim Guan Eng (2017–2022); Anthony Loke Siew Fook (2022–2025)
- National Organising Secretary: Anthony Loke Siew Fook (2017–2022); Steven Sim Chee Keong (2022–2025)
- Preceded by: Vincent Wu Him Ven
- Succeeded by: Lee Chin Chen

State Chairman of the Democratic Action Party of Malacca
- Incumbent
- Assumed office 7 June 2024
- Deputy: Saminathan Ganesan
- Secretary-General: Anthony Loke Siew Fook
- Preceded by: Tey Kok Kiew

Personal details
- Born: Khoo Poay Tiong; 13 December 1970 (age 55) Malacca, Malaysia
- Citizenship: Malaysian
- Party: Democratic Action Party (DAP) (1999–present)
- Other political affiliations: Barisan Alternatif (BA) (1999–2004); Pakatan Rakyat (PR) (2008–2015); Pakatan Harapan (PH) (2015–present)
- Spouse: Lee Wei Cheng
- Children: 3
- Education: University of Malaya (BA)

Khoo Poay Tiong

Chinese name
- Traditional Chinese: 邱培棟
- Simplified Chinese: 邱培栋
Transcriptions
Standard Mandarin
- Hanyu Pinyin: Qiū Péidòng
Southern Min
- Hokkien POJ: Khu Pôe-tòng

Khoo Poay Tiong (simplified Chinese: 邱培栋; traditional Chinese: 邱培棟; pinyin: Qiū Péidòng; Pe̍h-ōe-jī: Khu Pôe-tòng; born 13 December 1970) is a Malaysian politician who has served as Chairman of the Secretariat of the Malaysian Chinese New Village Division since May 2024 and the Member of Parliament (MP) for Kota Melaka since May 2018. He served as Leader of the Opposition of Malacca from July 2013 to May 2018 and Member of the Malacca State Legislative Assembly (MLA) for Ayer Keroh from March 2008 to May 2018. He is a member of the Democratic Action Party (DAP), a component party of Pakatan Harapan (PH) and formerly Pakatan Rakyat (PR) coalitions. He has served as the National Organising Secretary of DAP since March 2025 and State Chairman of DAP of Malacca since June 2024. He served as the Assistant National Organising Secretary of DAP from November 2017 to his promotion in March 2025. He was the State Vice Chairman prior to his promotion to the state chairmanship. He is presently the sole Malacca DAP MP.

== Early life and education ==
Khoo Poay Tiong was born at Malacca, Malaysia on 13 December 1970. Khoo is the eldest son of Khoo Nian Koon, a tailor in Malacca town. He graduated with Bachelor of Arts in Economics from the University of Malaya (UM).

== Political career ==
Prior to his political life, Khoo was a senior manager at Maybank before quitting his job to pursue full time in a life as a politician in year 2008. He was first elected as a State Assemblyman for Ayer Keroh, by successfully crushing a long held stronghold of Barisan Nasional of Ayer Keroh state seat by beating Chiew Hong Lan in the 12th General Election.

In year 2013, during the 13th General Election, Khoo retained his state assembly seat and was elected as the Opposition Leader for the state of Malacca.

In 2018, he moved from Malacca state politics to the federal politics. In the 2018 general election, he won Kota Melaka federal seat and was elected to Parliament as the Kota Melaka MP for the first term after defeating Choo Wei Sern of Barisan Nasional (BN) and independent candidate Goh Leong San by a majority of 49,175 votes.

In the 2022 general election, Khoo defended the Kota Melaka seat and was reelected to the Parliament as the Kota Melaka MP for the second term after defeating Suhaime Borhan of Perikatan Nasional (PN), Kon Qi Yao of BN and independent candidate Norazlanshah Hazali by a majority of 46,420 votes.

On 7 June 2024, after the resignation of Malacca DAP Chairman Tey Kok Kiew, Vice Chairman Khoo was unanimously promoted to Chairman by the state committee members in a meeting.

== Personal life ==
He is married to Lee Wei Cheng (李慧贞) with three daughters.

== Election results ==
Malacca State Legislative Assembly
Year	Constituency	Candidate	Votes	Pct	Opponent(s)	Votes	Pct	Ballots cast	Majority	Turnout
2008	N16 Ayer Keroh	Khoo Poay Tiong (DAP)	11,309	58.25%	Chiew Hong Lan (MCA)	8,104	41.75%	19,953	3,205	81.43%
2013	N16 Ayer Keroh	Khoo Poay Tiong (DAP)	18,934	63.27%	Yong Fun Juan (MCA)	10,991	36.73%	30,402	7,943	88.83%

Parliament of Malaysia
Year	Constituency	Candidate	Votes	Pct	Opponent(s)	Votes	Pct	Ballots cast	Majority	Turnout
2018	P138 Kota Melaka	Khoo Poay Tiong (DAP)	76,518	72.69%	Choo Wei Sern (MCA)	27,343	25.97%	107,085	49,175	84.42%
2018	P138 Kota Melaka	Khoo Poay Tiong (DAP)	76,518	72.69%	Goh Leong San (IND)	1,415	1.34%	107,085	49,175	84.42%
2022	P138 Kota Melaka	Khoo Poay Tiong (DAP)	73,995	60.07%	Suhaime Borhan (Gerakan)	27,575	22.39%	123,181	46,420	75.05%
2022	P138 Kota Melaka	Khoo Poay Tiong (DAP)	73,995	60.07%	Kon Qi Yao (MCA)	20,686	16.79%	123,181	46,420	75.05%
2022	P138 Kota Melaka	Khoo Poay Tiong (DAP)	73,995	60.07%	Norazlanshah Hazali (IND)	925	0.75%	123,181	46,420	75.05%

== Honours ==
=== Honours of Malaysia ===
- Malaysia
  - Recipient of the 17th Yang di-Pertuan Agong Installation Medal (2024)

Parliament of Malaysia
Preceded by Sim Tong Him	Member of Parliament for Kota Melaka; 9 May 2018–present	Incumbent
