= Malacca High School =

Secondary school in Malacca, Malaysia

- SMK Tinggi Melaka
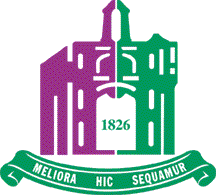

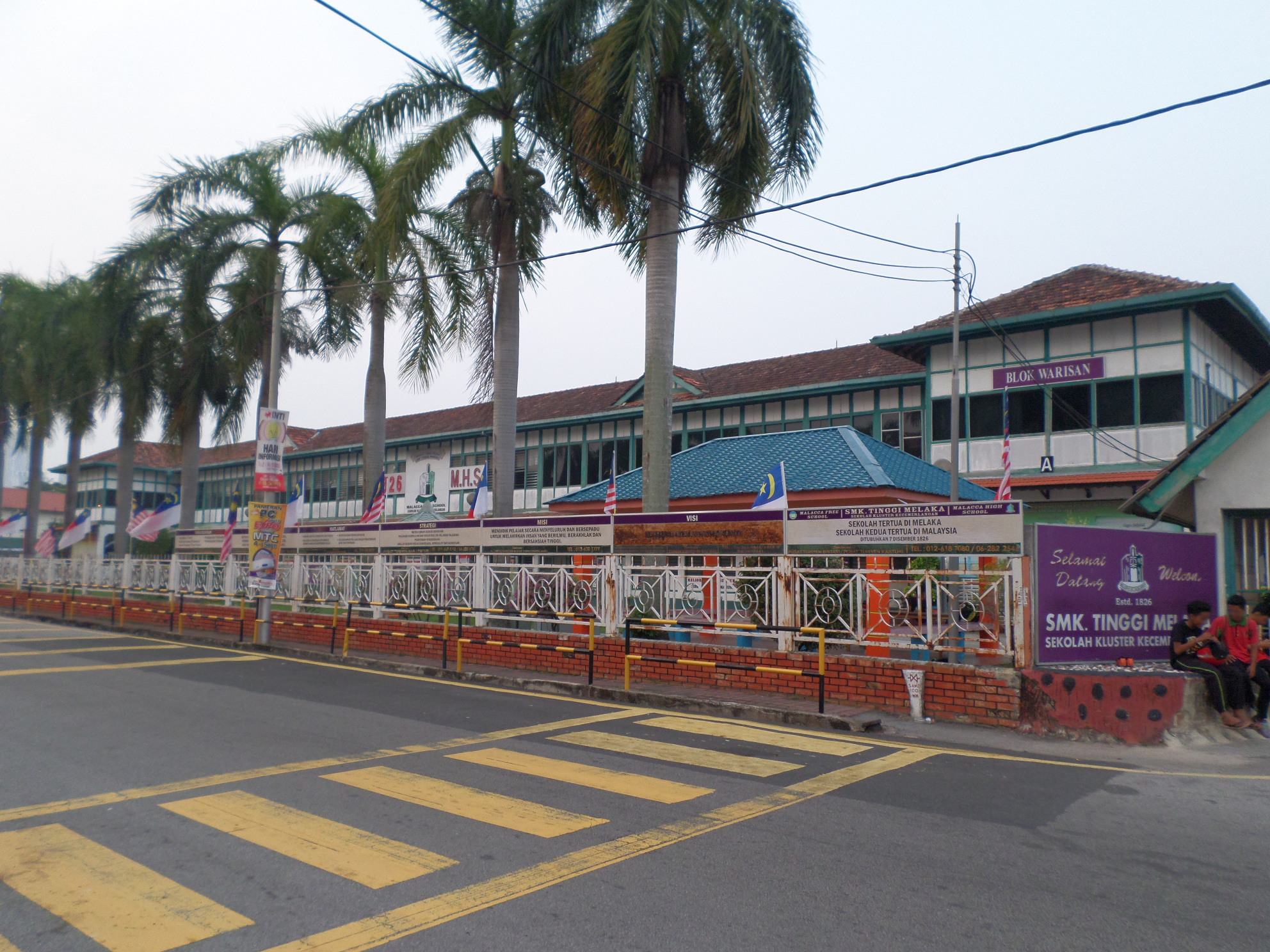

Location
- 61, Jalan Chan Koon Cheng; Malacca City, Malacca, 75000; Malaysia
- Coordinates: 2.191775°N 102.254654°E

Information
- Other name: MHS
- Type: State school, secondary school
- Motto: Latin: Meliora Hic Sequamur (Here we strive for better things)
- Established: 7 December 1826; 199 years ago
- Founder: Thomas H. Moor
- Session: Morning
- School code: MEB2090
- Principal: Tn Hj Johan Bin Othman
- Teaching staff: 119
- Forms: 1-6
- Gender: Male
- Enrollment: 831 (2022)
- Language: English, Malay
- Classrooms: 60 approx.
- Campus type: Urban
- Colours: Mauve and green
- Yearbook: The Optimist
- Affiliations: Xin Min Secondary School, Eltham High School
- Website: sites.google.com/moe-dl.edu.my/smktinggimelaka/laman-utama
- Last updated: 30 November 2022

Malacca High School (MHS, formerly Malacca Free School) is a secondary school in Malacca, Malaysia. Founded on 7 December 1826, it is the second oldest recorded school in the country after only Penang Free School. It was awarded cluster school status and is known as one of the premier schools in Malaysia.

== History ==
=== Establishment ===
On 7 December 1826, MHS was officially established; just after Malacca was made a British colony on 17 March 1824, when the Dutch ceded Malacca to the English after the Anglo-Dutch Treaty of 1824.

The establishment of the school (then known as Malacca Free School) was initiated by Thomas H. Moor, who came to Malacca in 1825 on the orders of William Milne, who was one of the educators at the Anglo-Chinese College. In his letter dated 4 January 1825, he stated his wishes to Arundel in London to establish a school. The establishment of the school was also supported by some influential people, including James Humphrey, a superintendent in the London Missionary Society. The startup of Malacca High School was directly related to the closing of the Dutch-Malay school which was established in January 1815 by Christian missionaries during the Dutch administration. The school was closed when Malacca was handed over to the British by the Dutch.

== School motto ==
=== Meliora Hic Sequamur ===
This old main motto stands for "Here We Strive For Better Things". The motto was introduced by the principal of Malacca High School L.W. Arnold. He was stationed in the school from 1931 to 1934. The use of the motto coincided with the shifting of the school from the High Court Building to the current location. The official opening of the school was in October 1931. The motto may have been chosen to coincide with the abbreviation of MHS for the school.

== School emblem ==
The school emblem was introduced in 1931. During this time the School Board of Governors was established and the motto "Meliora Hic Sequamur" was established. Originally, the school emblem reflected 'History', 'Resilience' and 'Strength'.

The 'A Famosa' logo was used and the colour of green and maroon were used. At the bottom of the logo, 'Meliora Hic Sequamur' was etched. At the beginning, this logo was used by the school prefects only but from 1970 all students wear the logo.

== Principals ==
- 1826 - T.H. Moor
- 1843 - John Overee
- 1862 - T. Smith
- 1878 - Alex Armstrong (A. Armstrong)
- 1893 - J. Howell
- 1916 - C.F.C. Ayre
- 1921 - C. Beamish
- 1924 - C.G. Coleman
- 1930 - T.A.O. Sullivan
- 1931 - L.W. Arnold
- 1934 - L.A.S. Jermyn
- 1941 - C.A. Scott, Lee Chin Lin
- 1945 - Goh Tiow Chong
- 1946 - C. Foster, C.J. Gurney
- 1950 - G.P. Dartford
- 1952 - F.T. Laidlaw, E.H. Bromley
- 1956 - A. Atkinson
- 1957 - W. Gibson
- 1958 - K. Kandiah, Ee Tiang Hong
- 1960 - C.T. Wade, Goh Keat Seng
- 1965 - Tan Teik Hock
- 1969 - Lim Leng Lee
- 1970 - K. Anandarajan
- 1972 - Chan Ying Tat
- 1985 - Abdul Rafie Mahat
- 1991 - Mohammad Ismail
- 1994 - Hussin Abdul Hamid
- 1996 - Mohd Zin Abdul Hamid
- 1998 - Othman Ibrahim
- 2000 - Noh Ahmad
- 2001 - Ya'amah Mohd Dris
- 2003 - Mohd Ali Saed
- 2006 - Yusof Ahmad
- 2007 - Abd. Razak Che Ngah
- 2014 - Ramnan Saidun
- 2022 - Johan Othman

== Notable alumni ==
=== Royalty ===
- Raja Chulan

=== Politics and Civil Service ===
- Mohd Ali Rustam, the 7th Yang di-Pertua Negeri of Malacca & the 9th Chief Minister of Malacca
- Lim Guan Eng, the 4th Chief Minister of Penang, MP for Bagan, MLA for Air Putih and former Finance Minister of Malaysia
- Abu Zahar Ithnin, the 8th Chief Minister of Malacca
- Tan Cheng Lock, one of the founding fathers of modern Malaysia and the founder of the Malaysian Chinese Association
- Abdullah Mohd Salleh - the 5th Chief Secretary to the Government
- Tan Siew Sin, Malaysian politician and former Minister of Finance and Industry
- Lai Siu Chiu, Justice of the Supreme Court of Singapore
- M.K. Rajakumar, politician

=== Literature ===
- Shirley Geok-Lin Lim, UCSB Distinguished Professor Emerita of English, winner of Commonwealth Poetry Prize and 2 American Book Awards.

=== Education ===
- Anuwar Ali, president of Open University Malaysia
