= Anuwar Ali =

Malaysian economist

Anuwar bin Md Ali (born 1946) is a Malaysian economist and exponent of higher education, is the second Vice-Chancellor and President of Open University Malaysia.

He began as a tutor in the Faculty of Economics and Business at Universiti Kebangsaan Malaysia (UKM) in 1973. From then on, he rose in ranks to become the Dean of Economics in 1993 and ultimately the Vice-Chancellor of UKM on 1 May 1998. In addition to this, he was the Director of Higher Education at the Ministry of Higher Education (1995–1998) and Chairman of the Malaysian Examination Council (2001–2003).

Born in Jasin, Melaka on 11 July 1946, he received his secondary education at Melaka High School. Later on he studied at Queen's University Belfast, Northern Ireland where he obtained his BSc (Econs) in 1970. While he was a tutor and lecturer at UKM, he furthered his studies and obtained his Masters and PhD from the University of Leicester and University of Kent, Canterbury, England respectively.

== Honour ==
=== Honour of Malaysia ===
- Malaysia : Commander of the Order of Loyalty to the Crown of Malaysia (P.S.M.) (2003)

== Publications ==
1. Malaysia's industrialization : The Quest for Technology, Singapore, Oxford University Press, 1992.
