= Pasir Pinji (federal constituency) =

Perak constituency

Defunct federal constituency
- Legislature: Dewan Rakyat
- Constituency created: 1984
- Constituency abolished: 1995
- First contested: 1986
- Last contested: 1990

Pasir Pinji was a federal constituency in Perak, Malaysia, that was represented in the Dewan Rakyat from 1986 to 1995.

The federal constituency was created in the 1984 redistribution and was mandated to return a single member to the Dewan Rakyat under the first past the post voting system.

== History ==
It was abolished in 1995 when it was redistributed.

=== Representation history ===
Members of Parliament for Pasir Pinji
Parliament	No	Years	Member	Party	Vote Share
Constituency created from Menglembu, Kinta and Ipoh
7th	P058	1986-1990	Lau Dak Kee (刘德琦)	DAP	31,643; 69.80%
8th	P058	1990-1995	Kerk Kim Hock (郭金福)	GR (DAP)	29,438; 67.03%
Constituency abolished, split into Tambun, Ipoh Timor and Ipoh Barat

=== State constituency ===
Parliamentary constituency	State constituency						
Parliamentary constituency	1955–59*	1959–1974	1974–1986	1986–1995	1995–2004	2004–2018	2018–present
Pasir Pinji				Dermawan			
Pasir Pinji				Tebing Tinggi			

=== Historical boundaries ===
State Constituency	Area
State Constituency	1984
Dermawan	Bercham; Ipoh Garden; Medan Ipoh; Razaki; Tasek
Tebing Tinggi	Gunung Rapat; Pasir Puteh; Taman Boon Bak; Taman Shatin; Tebing Tinggi

== Election results ==
Malaysian general election, 1990
Party	Candidate	Votes	%	∆%
DAP	Kerk Kim Hock	31,643	69.80	▲2.77
BN	Chew Wai Khoon	13,690	30.20	▼2.77
Total valid votes		45,333	100.00	
Total rejected ballots		782		
Unreturned ballots		0		
Turnout		46,115	67.27	▼2.04
Registered electors		68,551		
Majority		17,953	39.60	▲3.92
DAP hold		Swing		

Malaysian general election, 1986
Party	Candidate	Votes	%
DAP	Lau Dak Kee	29,438	67.03
BN	Ng Khek Kiung	13,767	31.35
SDP	Wong Nam Sang	710	1.62
Total valid votes		43,915	100.00
Total rejected ballots		667	
Unreturned ballots		0	
Turnout		44,582	69.31
Registered electors		64,320	
Majority		15,671	35.68
This was a new constituency created.
