= Kerk Chee Yee =

Malaysian politician (born 1992)

Yang Berhormat Kerk Chee Yee MLA
- 郭子毅
- Kerk in 2024

Member of the Malacca State Legislative Assembly
- Incumbent
- Assumed office 9 May 2018
- Preceded by: Khoo Poay Tiong
- Constituency: Ayer Keroh

Deputy Speaker of the Malacca State Legislative Assembly
- In office 31 July 2023 – 14 July 2026
- Preceded by: Khaidirah Abu Zahar

Member of the Malacca State Executive Council
- In office 16 May 2018 – 2 March 2020
- Communications, multimedia, non-governmental organisations, youth and sports

Personal details
- Born: 9 July 1992 (age 34) Malacca, Malaysia
- Party: Democratic Action Party (DAP)
- Other political affiliations: Pakatan Harapan (PH)
- Parent: Kerk Kim Hock (father)
- Education: University of Melbourne
- Occupation: Politician

Kerk Chee Yee (Chinese: 郭子毅; born 9 July 1992) is a Malaysian politician of the Democratic Action Party (DAP), a component of Pakatan Harapan (PH). He has represented the Ayer Keroh constituency in the Malacca State Legislative Assembly since May 2018. He was a member of the Malacca State Executive Council from May 2018 to March 2020 and served as Deputy Speaker of the state legislative assembly from 31 July 2023 until his resignation on 14 July 2026.

Kerk previously served as political secretary to veteran DAP politician Lim Kit Siang. He is a son of Kerk Kim Hock, the former DAP secretary-general and a former member of Parliament.

== Early life and education ==
Kerk was born in Malacca in 1992. He is the son of the late Kerk Kim Hock, who served as the DAP's secretary-general between 1999 and 2004 and represented several constituencies during his political career. His father was also a member of the Malacca State Legislative Assembly for Durian Daun from 1986 to 1990.

Kerk graduated from the University of Melbourne in Australia in 2014, having studied finance and accounting. He subsequently worked in investment banking before leaving the sector in June 2017 to become a full-time researcher for the DAP. In an interview published that year, he discussed the influence of studying in Australia and conversations with other Malaysian students on his decision to enter politics.

== Political career ==
=== Early party work ===
Kerk joined the DAP's research team in 2017. In August that year, Lim Kit Siang announced Kerk's appointment as his political secretary at a memorial event for Kerk's father. Lim had previously appointed Kerk Kim Hock to the same role, making the appointments notable as a father-and-son succession in his office.

He was selected to contest the Ayer Keroh state constituency as a Pakatan Harapan candidate at the 2018 Malaysian general election. In a pre-election interview, he advocated free public bus services connecting Melaka's major public facilities and tourist attractions and called for greater scrutiny of proposed housing developments to address affordability and unsold units; these were campaign proposals, not measures established as completed.

=== Election to the Melaka State Legislative Assembly (2018) ===
At the 2018 general election, Kerk won Ayer Keroh with 14,279 votes (65.31% of valid votes), defeating Barisan Nasional candidate Chua Kheng Hwa and PAS candidate Sepri Rahman. His majority was 9,261 votes. He succeeded Khoo Poay Tiong as the constituency's representative.

=== State executive councillor (2018–2020) ===
Following Pakatan Harapan's formation of the Melaka state government under Chief Minister Adly Zahari in May 2018, Kerk joined the Malacca State Executive Council. His portfolio encompassed communications, multimedia, non-governmental organisations, youth and sports. His tenure ended in March 2020 following the collapse of the Pakatan Harapan-led state administration.

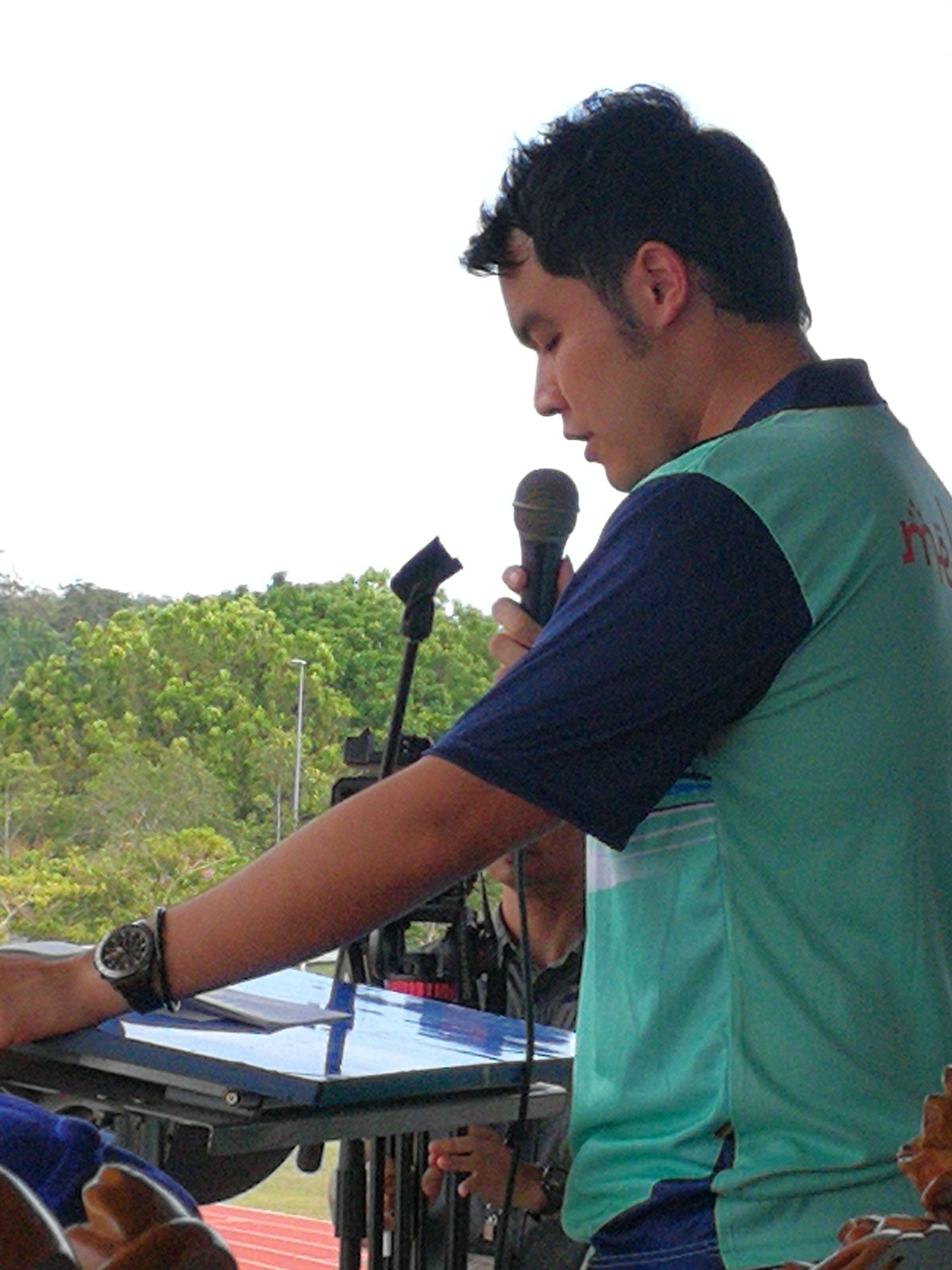
Kerk delivering an opening address at a sports event in Melaka in April 2019, during his tenure as state executive councillor.

As the state executive councillor responsible for youth and sports, Kerk announced plans for the 2019 Melaka Youth Day celebrations, which were designed to combine youth entrepreneurship activities, sports and cultural programming. He also supported the development of electronic sports in the state. In October 2019, he said the state government was working with industry participants and associations to address concerns among parents and teachers about gaming and education.

During the September 2019 regional haze, Kerk announced the postponement of outdoor sports and training activities under the Melaka Sports Council because air quality had deteriorated. In February 2020, he also urged the public to verify coronavirus-related information before sharing it online, as misinformation circulated during the early phase of the COVID-19 outbreak.

During the 2026 Malacca state election campaign, Kerk referred to initiatives undertaken while he held the youth portfolio, including a youth housing scheme and a Melaka artificial-intelligence-of-things initiative. These were statements by Kerk about his previous administration's work, rather than independently established assessments of those programmes' outcomes.

=== Re-election in 2021 ===
Kerk retained Ayer Keroh at the 2021 Malacca state election in a three-cornered contest. He received 9,459 votes (59.97%), against 3,835 for Barisan Nasional's Yong Fun Juan and 2,479 for Perikatan Nasional's Michael Gan Peng Lam. His majority of 5,624 votes was lower than the 9,261-vote majority recorded in 2018.

=== Opposition and legislative policy work (2021–2023) ===
In December 2021, Kerk criticised the shortening of a special state assembly sitting during the COVID-19 pandemic, arguing that the legislature should consider online or hybrid sittings to maintain questions and scrutiny of the government's response. He also called for an explanation of a decision to prohibit alcohol sales at the state-owned Ayer Keroh Country Club. Chief Minister Sulaiman Md Ali said the decision followed complaints from club members and concerns over licensing.

During a state assembly debate in March 2023, Kerk proposed a mechanism for releasing unsold properties reserved under the Bumiputera housing quota when units above RM300,000 remained unsold after a specified period. He argued that the measure could reduce carrying costs and help maintain housing affordability. The proposal was a recommendation in the legislative debate, not an enacted policy attributed to him.

=== Deputy Speaker of the Melaka State Legislative Assembly (2023–2026) ===
On 31 July 2023, Kerk was elected Deputy Speaker of the Melaka State Legislative Assembly. Chief Minister Ab Rauf Yusoh nominated him, and the proposal was seconded by senior state executive councillor Rais Yasin. Twenty-four assembly members voted in favour, two abstained and two were absent. Kerk succeeded Khaidirah Abu Zahar in the position.

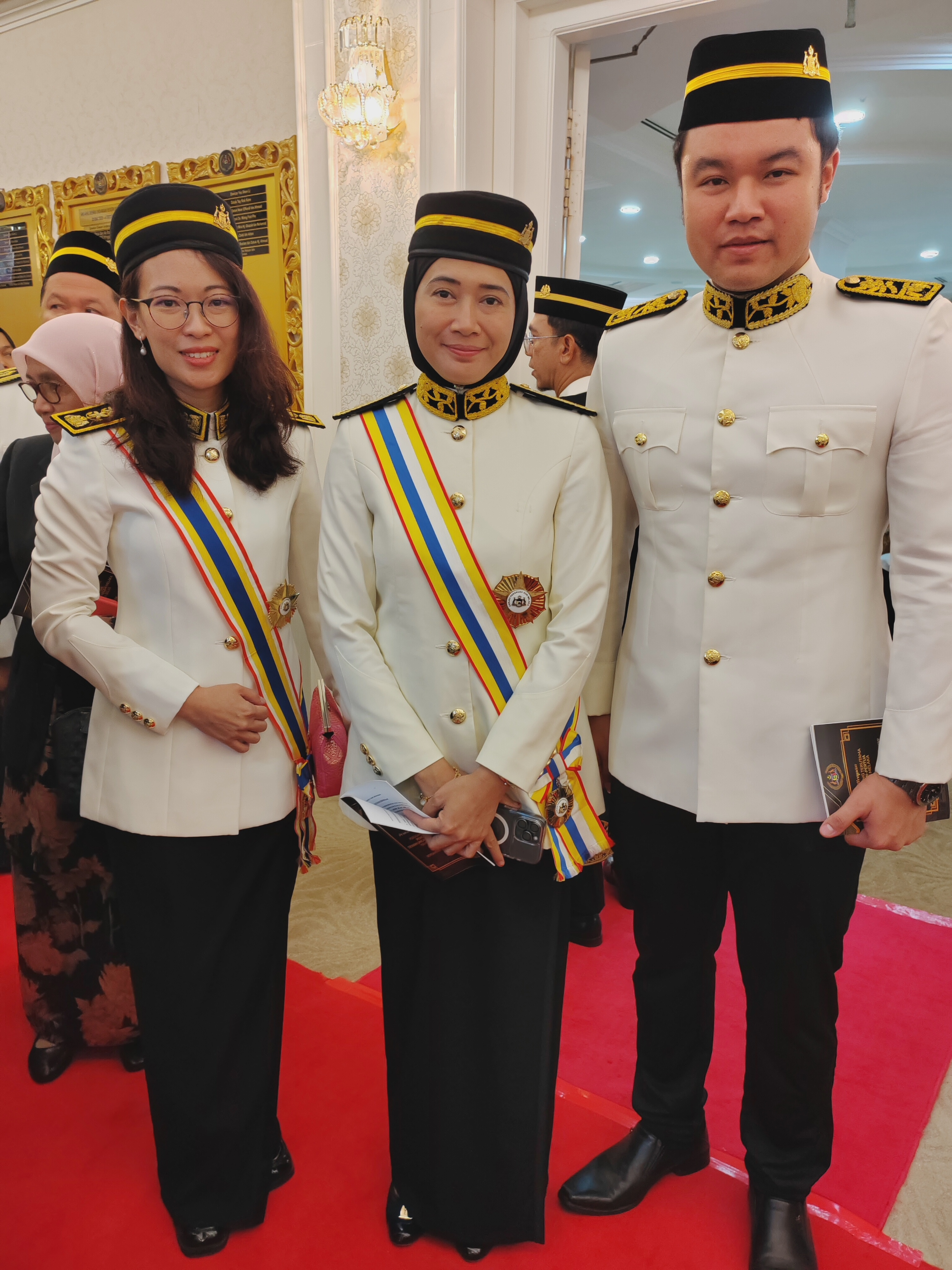
Kerk with other state political figures following the opening of a Melaka State Assembly meeting in March 2024.

His appointment occurred during the period in which Pakatan Harapan representatives were participating in the Barisan Nasional-led Melaka state administration. Kerk said after his appointment that it reflected cooperation between the two coalitions in the state government.

==== Resignation in July 2026 ====
On 14 July 2026, DAP announced that its representatives would leave their positions in the Melaka state government following a constitutional amendment allowing for appointed members of the state legislature. Kerk resigned as Deputy Speaker, alongside the resignations of other Pakatan Harapan officeholders. DAP leaders argued that appointing unelected members was inconsistent with democratic representation; the amendment had nevertheless been approved by the assembly. Kerk and the other Pakatan Harapan representatives subsequently moved to the opposition benches.

=== Constituency development and public facilities ===
Kerk has been involved in constituency-level public-space projects in Ayer Keroh. In January 2025, Bernama reported his announcement that three MADANI parks had been developed or upgraded during 2024: Taman Ayer Keroh Height, Taman Sutera Wangi in Batu Berendam and Taman Kerjasama in Bukit Beruang. The projects were implemented under a federal Ministry of Housing and Local Government initiative, rather than funded solely by the assemblyman's office.

In April 2026, Kerk reported that RM1.8 million had been allocated in 2025 by the Ministry of Housing and Local Government for drainage improvements in flood-prone areas of Ayer Keroh. He said around 15 flash-flood hotspots had been identified and reported a lower frequency of flooding after upgrades. He also cited the ongoing Sungai Putat Flood Mitigation Plan, which included retention ponds, drainage improvements and a pump house, with completion projected for 2027. The reported reduction was Kerk's assessment and is not presented as a separately audited result.

A May 2026 report also described the development of a multipurpose community hall and pickleball facility at Taman Ara Permai, Sungai Putat, funded under the MADANI Adopted Village programme. Kerk stated that the venue was intended to offer affordable public access to recreational facilities. The report described the project as under development, rather than confirming its later completion.

=== 2026 Melaka state election ===
Kerk stood for re-election in Ayer Keroh in the 2026 Malacca state election, in a four-cornered contest against Perikatan Nasional's Michael Gan Peng Lam, Parti Bersama Malaysia's Muhammad Muhaimin Lau Abdullah and Bersatu's Mohd Hamnaim Mohamad.

In the lead-up to polling, he advocated greater economic opportunities for young people in Ayer Keroh and publicly called for political debate centred on policy rather than personal attacks.

On polling night, 14 November 2026, preliminary media tallies indicated that Kerk had retained the seat. An 8:11 p.m. report in The Star gave him 12,427 votes, compared with 6,813 for Michael Gan, 1,632 for Muhammad Muhaimin Lau and 849 for Mohd Hamnaim. These figures were described as unofficial at the time of publication, and subsequent unofficial tallies differed as counting continued. No numerical figure should be treated as the certified Election Commission result.

== Election results ==
Malacca State Legislative Assembly
Year	Constituency	Candidate	Votes	Pct	Opponent(s)	Votes	Pct	Ballots cast	Majority	Turnout
2018	N16 Ayer Keroh	Kerk Chee Yee (DAP)	14,279	65.31%	Chua Kheng Hwa (MCA)	5,018	22.95%	21,864	9,261	85.62%
2018	N16 Ayer Keroh	Kerk Chee Yee (DAP)	14,279	65.31%	Sepri Rahman (PAS)	2,567	11.74%	21,864	9,261	85.62%
2021	N16 Ayer Keroh	Kerk Chee Yee (DAP)	9,459	59.97%	Yong Fun Juan (MCA)	3,835	24.31%	15,773	5,624	60.79%
2021	N16 Ayer Keroh	Kerk Chee Yee (DAP)	9,459	59.97%	Michael Gan Peng Lam (GERAKAN)	2,479	15.71%	15,773	5,624	60.79%
2026	N16 Ayer Keroh	Kerk Chee Yee (DAP)	14,078	55.08%	Michael Gan Peng Lam (GERAKAN)	8,474	33.15%	25,561	5,604	66.82%
2026	N16 Ayer Keroh	Kerk Chee Yee (DAP)	14,078	55.08%	Muhammad Muhaimin Lau Abdullah (BERSAMA)	1,932	7.56%	25,561	5,604	66.82%
2026	N16 Ayer Keroh	Kerk Chee Yee (DAP)	14,078	55.08%	Mohd Hamnaim Mohamad (BERSATU)	1,077	4.21%	25,561	5,604	66.82%
