= Lye Siew Weng =

Malaysian politician

Yang Berbahagia Dato' Lye Siew Weng DSPN DJN KMN
- 黎兆榮

Member of the Penang State Legislative Assembly for Air Putih
- In office 21 March 2004 – 8 March 2008
- Preceded by: Constituency created
- Succeeded by: Lim Guan Eng (PR–DAP)
- Majority: 818 (2004)

Member of the Penang State Legislative Assembly for Air Itam
- In office 1995 – 21 March 2004
- Preceded by: Ong Hock Aun (DAP)
- Succeeded by: Cheang Chee Gooi (BN–Gerakan)
- Majority: 2,735 (1995); 3,708 (1999)

Personal details
- Born: 1 September 1941 Penang, Straits Settlements
- Died: 28 February 2018 (aged 77)
- Party: Malaysian Chinese Association (MCA)
- Other political affiliations: Barisan Nasional (BN)
- Occupation: Politician, teacher

Lye Siew Weng (Chinese: 黎兆榮; 1 September 1941 – 28 February 2018) was a Malaysian politician. He was a member of the Penang State Legislative Assembly, representing Air Itam between 1995 and 2004, then Air Putih as well as Deputy Speaker from 2004 to 2008.

Before politics he was teacher, primary school headmaster and social worker

He died of bone cancer on 28 February 2018, aged 77.

== Election results ==
Penang State Legislative Assembly
Year	Constituency	Candidate	Votes	Pct	Opponent(s)	Votes	Pct	Ballots cast	Majority	Turnout
1995	N20 Air Itam	Lye Siew Weng (MCA)	10,057	57.87%	Ong Hock Aun (DAP)	7,322	42.13%		2,735	
1999	N20 Air Itam	Lye Siew Weng (MCA)	10,539	60.67%	Ong Hock Aun (DAP)	6,831	39.33%	17,721	3,708	72.52%
2004	N23 Air Putih	Lye Siew Weng (MCA)	4,811	55.92%	Tee Yee Cheu (DAP)	3,793	44.08%	8,779	818	71.13%

== Honours ==
- Malaysia
  - Officer of the Order of the Defender of the Realm (KMN) (2002)
- Penang
  - Officer of the Order of the Defender of State (DSPN) – Dato' (2006)
  - Member of the Order of the Defender of State (DJN) (2003)
