= Kota Melaka (federal constituency) =

Federal constituency of Malacca, Malaysia

Kota Melaka (P138)
Malacca constituency

Federal constituency
- Legislature: Dewan Rakyat
- MP: Khoo Poay Tiong; PH
- Constituency created: 1974
- First contested: 1974
- Last contested: 2022

Demographics
- Population (2020): 215,409
- Electors (2026): 168,297
- Area (km²): 66
- Pop. density (per km²): 3,263.8

Kota Melaka is a federal constituency in Melaka Tengah District, Malacca, Malaysia, that has been represented in the Dewan Rakyat since 1974.

The federal constituency was created in the 1974 redistribution and is mandated to return a single member to the Dewan Rakyat under the first past the post voting system.

== Demographics ==
Ethnic breakdown of Kota Melaka's electorate as of 2022
1. Chinese (54.2%)
2. Malay (40.0%)
3. Indian (4.60%)
4. Other ethnicities (1.20%)

As of 2020, Kota Melaka has a population of 215,409 people.

Age breakdown of Kota Melaka's electorate as of 2022
1. 18-20 (5.43%)
2. 21-29 (18.8%)
3. 30-39 (19.9%)
4. 40-49 (17.1%)
5. 50-59 (15.1%)
6. 60-69 (13.3%)
7. 70-79 (7.29%)
8. 80-89 (2.54%)
9. above 90 (0.52%)
Gender breakdown of Kota Melaka's electorate as of 2022
1. Male (48.6%)
2. Female (51.4%)

== History ==
=== Polling districts ===
According to the gazette issued on 5 November 2026, the Kota Melaka constituency has a total of 46 polling districts.

State constituency	Polling districts	Code	Location
Kesidang (N19)	Taman Merdeka	138/19/01	SK Taman Merdeka; SRA (JAIM) Taman Datuk Thamby Chik Karim
Kesidang (N19)	Batu Berendam	138/19/02	SK Batu Berendam
Kesidang (N19)	Taman Melaka Baru	138/19/03	SK Batu Berendam 2
Kesidang (N19)	Malim Jaya	138/19/04	SMK Malim
Kesidang (N19)	Bertam	138/19/05	SK Malim; SJK (C) Ting Hwa
Kesidang (N19)	Taman Asean	138/19/06	SJK (C) Malim
Kesidang (N19)	Kampung Padang	138/19/07	SRA (JAIM) Kampung Padang
Kesidang (N19)	Bakar Batu	138/19/08	SK Bachang
Kesidang (N19)	Limbongan	138/19/09	SK Tengkera 1
Kota Laksamana (N20)	Kesidang Indah	138/20/01	SMK Tun Tuah
Kota Laksamana (N20)	Tun Perak	138/20/02	SMJK Tinggi Cina Melaka
Kota Laksamana (N20)	Kampung Enam	138/20/03	SMJK Notre Dame Convent
Kota Laksamana (N20)	Pengkalan Rama Pantai	138/20/04	SJK (C) Ping Ming
Kota Laksamana (N20)	Kenanga Seksyen 1	138/20/05	SRA (JAIM) Tengkera
Kota Laksamana (N20)	Kenanga Seksyen 2	138/20/06	SMJK Katholik
Kota Laksamana (N20)	Kenanga Seksyen 3	138/20/07	SJK (C) Notre Dome
Kota Laksamana (N20)	Tengkera Pantai	138/20/08	SMK (P) Methodist
Kota Laksamana (N20)	Tengkera	138/20/09	SMK Gajah Berang
Kota Laksamana (N20)	Kubu	138/20/10	Sekolah Menengah Pay Fong
Kota Laksamana (N20)	Kampung Morten	138/20/11	SRA (JAIM) Al Aliah Kubu
Kota Laksamana (N20)	Pengkalan Rama	138/20/12	SJK (C) Ping Ming
Kota Laksamana (N20)	Kampung Hulu	138/20/13	SJK (C) Pay Teck
Kota Laksamana (N20)	Kampung Belanda	138/20/14	SJK (T) Melaka (Kubu)
Kota Laksamana (N20)	Taman Kota Laksamana	138/20/15	SK Kubu
Duyong (N21)	Pengkalan Rama Tengah	138/21/01	SMK Tun Tijah
Duyong (N21)	Durian Daun	138/21/02	SK (P) Durian Daun
Duyong (N21)	Kg Padang Semabok	138/21/03	SK Pendidikan Khas Melaka
Duyong (N21)	Semabok	138/21/04	SK Semabok
Duyong (N21)	Perigi Hang Tuah	138/21/05	SK Duyong
Duyong (N21)	Seri Duyong	138/21/06	SK Seri Duyong; SRA (JAIM) Seri Duyong
Bandar Hilir (N22)	Bunga Raya	138/22/01	SMK Tinggi Perempuan Melaka
Bandar Hilir (N22)	Bukit China	138/22/02	SK Bukit China
Bandar Hilir (N22)	Bukit Gedong	138/22/03	SK Seri Bandar
Bandar Hilir (N22)	Bandar Kaba	138/22/04	SMK St. Francis
Bandar Hilir (N22)	Bandar Hilir Tengah	138/22/05	SMK Infant Jesus Convent
Bandar Hilir (N22)	Lorong Panjang	138/22/06	SJK (C) Pay Fong 2
Bandar Hilir (N22)	Kg Bandar Hilir	138/22/07	SK Convent Infant Jesus 1
Bandar Hilir (N22)	Melaka Raya	138/22/08	SK Convent Infant Jesus 2
Bandar Hilir (N22)	Perkampungan Portugis	138/22/09	SMK Canossa Convent
Bandar Hilir (N22)	Ujong Pasir Pantai	138/22/10	SMK Canossa Convent
Telok Mas (N23)	Ujong Pasir Darat	138/23/01	SK Ujong Pasir
Telok Mas (N23)	Kampung Ujong Pasir	138/23/02	SRA (JAIM) Ujung Pasir
Telok Mas (N23)	Padang Temu	138/23/03	SK Padang Temu
Telok Mas (N23)	Alai	138/23/04	SK Alai; SJK (C) Kuang Yah
Telok Mas (N23)	Kg Telok Mas	138/23/05	SMK Telok Mas
Telok Mas (N23)	Pernu	138/23/06	SK Pernu; SMK Pernu

=== Representation history ===
Members of Parliament for Kota Melaka
Parliament	No	Years	Member	Party	Vote Share
Constituency created from Bandar Malacca and Malacca Tengah
4th	P098	1974–1978	Lim Kit Siang (林吉祥)	DAP	17,664; 51.93%
5th	P098	1978–1982	Chan Teck Chan (陈德泉)	DAP	28,044; 61.11%
6th	P098	1982–1986	Lim Kit Siang (林吉祥)	DAP	29,310; 54.51%
7th	P113	1986–1990	Lim Guan Eng (林冠英)	DAP	34,573; 67.08%
8th	P113	1990–1995	Lim Guan Eng (林冠英)	GR (DAP)	33,993; 63.52%
9th	P123	1995–1999	Lim Guan Eng (林冠英)	GR (DAP)	29,647; 54.57%
9th	P123	1999	Vacant		
10th	P123	1999–2004	Kerk Kim Hock (郭金福)	BA (DAP)	33,472; 58.16%
11th	P138	2004–2008	Wong Nai Chee (王乃志)	BN (MCA)	31,217; 50.18%
12th	P138	2008–2013	Sim Tong Him (沈同钦)	PR (DAP)	38,640; 58.64%
13th	P138	2013–2015	Sim Tong Him (沈同钦)	PR (DAP)	49,521; 63.25%
13th	P138	2015–2017	Sim Tong Him (沈同钦)	PH (DAP)	49,521; 63.25%
13th	P138	2018	Sim Tong Him (沈同钦)	Independent	49,521; 63.25%
14th	P138	2018–2022	Khoo Poay Tiong (邱培栋)	PH (DAP)	76,518; 72.69%
15th	P138	2022–present	Khoo Poay Tiong (邱培栋)	PH (DAP)	73,995; 60.07%

=== State constituency ===
Parliamentary constituency	State constituency						
Parliamentary constituency	1955–59*	1959–1974	1974–1986	1986–1995	1995–2004	2004–2018	2018–present
Kota Melaka					Alai		
Kota Melaka			Bandar Hilir				
Kota Melaka			Durian Daun				
Kota Melaka					Duyong		
Kota Melaka						Kesidang	
Kota Melaka						Kota Laksamana	
Kota Melaka			Kubu				
Kota Melaka			Pringgit				
Kota Melaka						Telok Mas	
Kota Melaka					Tengkera		
Kota Melaka			Tranquerah				

=== Historical boundaries ===
State Constituency	Area				
State Constituency	1974	1984	1994	2003	2018
Alai			Alai; Padang Temu; Pernu; Umbai; Ujong Pasir		
Bandar Hilir	Bandar Hilir; Bukit Senjuang; Melaka Raya; Perkampungan Portugis; Ujong Pasir	Bandar Hilir; Kandang; Padang Temu; Telok Mas; Ujong Pasir	Bandar Hilir; Jonker Street; Melaka Raya; Perkampungan Portugis; Taman Nam Yang	Bandar Hilir; Bukit Gedong; Melaka Raya; Perkampungan Portugis; Taman Bendahara	Bandar Hilir; Bukit China; Bukit Gedong; Melaka Raya; Perkampungan Portugis
Durian Daun	Durian Daun; Kampung Hulu; Kampung Mata Kuching; Kampung Pengkalan Rama; Kubu		Durian Daun; Kampung Hulu; Kampung Mata Kuching; Kampung Pengkalan Rama; Taman Bendahara		
Duyong			Bukit China; Bukit Serindit; Duyong; Peringit Hang Tuah; Semabok	Bukit China; Durian Daun; Duyong; Kampung Pengkalan Rama Tengah; Semabok	Durian Daun; Duyong; Kampung Pengkalan Rama Tengah; Perigi Hang Tuah; Semabok
Kesidang				Kampung Limbongan; Kesidang; Pandan; Taman Pokok Jaya; Taman Siantan	Batu Berendam; Kesidang; Malim Jaya; Pandan; Taman ASEAN
Kota Laksmaana				Kubu; Kampung Mata Kuching; Kampung Morten; Kota Laksamana; Tengkera	Kubu; Kampung Morten; Kota Laksamana; Taman Siantan; Tengkera
Kubu	Kampung Chetti; Kampung Empat; Kampung Lama; Kampung Pengkalan Rama; Kubu				
Pringgit	Bukit Baru; Bukit Piatu; Kampung Padang Jambu; Padang Temu; Peringgit				
Telok Mas				Alai; Padang Temu; Pernu; Umbai; Ujong Pasir	
Tengkera	Kampung Limbongan; Klebang Jaya; Taman Kenaga; Taman Siantan; Tranquerah	Kesidang; Pandan; Taman Pokok Mangga; Taman Siantan; Tranquerah	Kesidang; Kubu; Pandan; Taman Siantan; Tengkera		

=== Current state assembly members ===
No.	State Constituency	Member	Coalition (Party)
N19	Kesidang	Allex Seah Shoo Chin	PH (DAP)
N20	Kota Laksamana	Low Chee Leong	PH (DAP)
N21	Duyong	Mohd Noor Helmy Abdul Halem	BN (UMNO)
N22	Bandar Hilir	Leng Chau Yen	PH (DAP)
N23	Telok Mas	Abdul Razak Abdul Rahman	BN (UMNO)

=== Local governments & postcodes ===
No.	State Constituency	Local Government	Postcode
N19	Kesidang	Malacca City Council; Hang Tuah Jaya Municipal Council (Batu Berendam area)	75000, 75050, 75100, 75200, 75250, 75260, 75300, 75350, 75400, 75460, 75500, 75502, 75503, 75520 Melaka
N20	Kota Laksamana	Malacca City Council	75000, 75050, 75100, 75200, 75250, 75260, 75300, 75350, 75400, 75460, 75500, 75502, 75503, 75520 Melaka
N21	Duyong	Malacca City Council	75000, 75050, 75100, 75200, 75250, 75260, 75300, 75350, 75400, 75460, 75500, 75502, 75503, 75520 Melaka
N22	Bandar Hilir	Malacca City Council	75000, 75050, 75100, 75200, 75250, 75260, 75300, 75350, 75400, 75460, 75500, 75502, 75503, 75520 Melaka
N23	Telok Mas	Malacca City Council	75000, 75050, 75100, 75200, 75250, 75260, 75300, 75350, 75400, 75460, 75500, 75502, 75503, 75520 Melaka

== Election results ==
Malaysian general election, 2022
Party	Candidate	Votes	%	∆%
PH	Khoo Poay Tiong	73,995	60.07	▲60.07
PN	Suhaime Borhan	27,575	22.39	▲22.39
BN	Kon Qi Yao	20,686	16.79	▼8.18
Independent	Norazlanshah Hazali	925	0.75	▲0.75
Total valid votes		123,181	100.00	
Total rejected ballots		1,338		
Unreturned ballots		297		
Turnout		124,816	76.04	▼8.38
Registered electors		164,140		
Majority		46,420	37.68	▼9.04
PH hold		Swing		
Source(s) https://lom.agc.gov.my/ilims/upload/portal/akta/outputp/1753258/PUB%20616%20PARLIMEN%20MELAKA.pdf

Malaysian general election, 2018
Party	Candidate	Votes	%	∆%
PKR	Khoo Poay Tiong	76,518	72.69	▲72.69
BN	Choo Wei Sern	27,343	25.97	▼10.78
Independent	Goh Leong San	1,415	1.34	▲1.34
Total valid votes		105,276	100.00	
Total rejected ballots		1,432		
Unreturned ballots		377		
Turnout		107,085	84.42	▼1.86
Registered electors		126,848		
Majority		49,175	46.72	▲20.22
PKR hold		Swing		
Source(s) "His Majesty's Government Gazette - Notice of Contested Election, Parliament for the State of Malacca [P.U. (B) 243/2018]" (PDF). Attorney General's Chambers of Malaysia. 3 May 2018. "Federal Government Gazette - Results of Contested Election and Statements of the Poll after the Official Addition of Votes, Parliamentary Constituencies for the State of Malacca [P.U. (B) 317/2018]" (PDF). Attorney General's Chambers of Malaysia. 28 May 2018. Archived from the original (PDF) on 2019-12-29.

Malaysian general election, 2013
Party	Candidate	Votes	%	∆%
DAP	Sim Tong Him	49,521	63.25	▲4.61
BN	Yee Kok Wah	28,775	36.75	▼4.61
Total valid votes		78,296	100.00	
Total rejected ballots		1,168		
Unreturned ballots		187		
Turnout		79,651	86.28	▲6.71
Registered electors		92,322		
Majority		20,746	26.50	▲9.22
DAP hold		Swing		
Source(s) "Federal Government Gazette - Notice of Contested Election, Parliament for the State of Malacca [P.U. (B) 180/2013]" (PDF). Attorney General's Chambers of Malaysia. 26 April 2013. "Federal Government Gazette - Results of Contested Election and Statements of the Poll after the Official Addition of Votes, Parliamentary Constituencies for the State of Malacca [P.U. (B) 221/2013]" (PDF). Attorney General's Chambers of Malaysia. 22 May 2013.

Malaysian general election, 2008
Party	Candidate	Votes	%	∆%
DAP	Sim Tong Him	38,640	58.64	▲8.82
BN	Wong Nai Chee	27,250	41.36	▼8.82
Total valid votes		65,890	100.00	
Total rejected ballots		1,448		
Unreturned ballots		141		
Turnout		67,479	79.57	▲1.79
Registered electors		84,805		
Majority		11,390	17.28	▲16.92
DAP gain from BN		Swing		?

Malaysian general election, 2004
Party	Candidate	Votes	%	∆%
BN	Wong Nai Chee	31,217	50.18	▲8.34
DAP	Kerk Kim Hock	30,998	49.82	▼8.34
Total valid votes		62,215	100.00	
Total rejected ballots		1,959		
Unreturned ballots		217		
Turnout		64,391	77.78	▲0.63
Registered electors		82,781		
Majority		219	0.36	▼15.96
BN gain from DAP		Swing		?

Malaysian general election, 1999
Party	Candidate	Votes	%	∆%
DAP	Kerk Kim Hock	33,472	58.16	▲3.59
BN	Lim Swee Kiang	24,083	41.84	▼3.59
Total valid votes		57,555	100.00	
Total rejected ballots		1,277		
Unreturned ballots		89		
Turnout		58,921	77.15	▲0.35
Registered electors		76,384		
Majority		9,389	16.32	▲7.18
DAP hold		Swing		

Malaysian general election, 1995
Party	Candidate	Votes	%	∆%
DAP	Lim Guan Eng	29,647	54.57	▼8.95
BN	Soon Tian Szu	24,683	45.43	▲8.95
Total valid votes		54,330	100.00	
Total rejected ballots		2,231		
Unreturned ballots		191		
Turnout		56,752	76.80	▲0.35
Registered electors		73,894		
Majority		4,964	9.14	▼17.90
DAP hold		Swing		

Malaysian general election, 1990
Party	Candidate	Votes	%	∆%
DAP	Lim Guan Eng	33,993	63.52	▼3.56
BN	Soon Tian Szu	19,525	36.48	▲3.56
Total valid votes		53,518	100.00	
Total rejected ballots		1,227		
Unreturned ballots		0		
Turnout		54,745	76.45	▼0.09
Registered electors		71,608		
Majority		14,468	27.04	▼7.12
DAP hold		Swing		

Malaysian general election, 1986
Party	Candidate	Votes	%	∆%
DAP	Lim Guan Eng	34,573	67.08	▲12.57
BN	Soh Chin Aun	16,967	32.92	▼12.57
Total valid votes		51,540	100.00	
Total rejected ballots		1,300		
Unreturned ballots		0		
Turnout		52,840	76.54	▼2.02
Registered electors		69,034		
Majority		17,606	34.16	▲25.14
DAP hold		Swing		

Malaysian general election, 1982
Party	Candidate	Votes	%	∆%
DAP	Lim Kit Siang	29,310	54.51	▼6.60
BN	Chan Teck Chan	24,459	45.49	▲6.60
Total valid votes		53,769	100.00	
Total rejected ballots		1,145		
Unreturned ballots		0		
Turnout		54,914	78.56	▼0.28
Registered electors		69,900		
Majority		4,851	9.02	▼13.20
DAP hold		Swing		

Malaysian general election, 1978
Party	Candidate	Votes	%	∆%
DAP	Chan Teck Chan	28,044	61.11	▲9.18
BN	Chew Hock Thye	17,844	38.89	▼0.68
Total valid votes		45,888	100.00	
Total rejected ballots		1,486		
Unreturned ballots		0		
Turnout		47,374	78.84	▲0.55
Registered electors		60,086		
Majority		10,200	22.22	▲9.86
DAP hold		Swing		

Malaysian general election, 1974
Party	Candidate	Votes	%
DAP	Lim Kit Siang	17,664	51.93
BN	Loh Kee Peng	13,460	39.57
Parti Rakyat Malaysia	Thum Kim Kui	2,165	6.36
PEKEMAS	Lee Kou Ming	726	2.13
Total valid votes		34,015	100.00
Total rejected ballots		723	
Unreturned ballots		0	
Turnout		34,738	78.29
Registered electors		44,370	
Majority		4,204	12.36
This was a new constituency created.
