= Lim Guan Eng =

Malaysian politician

Yang Berhormat Tuan Lim Guan Eng MP MLA
- 林冠英
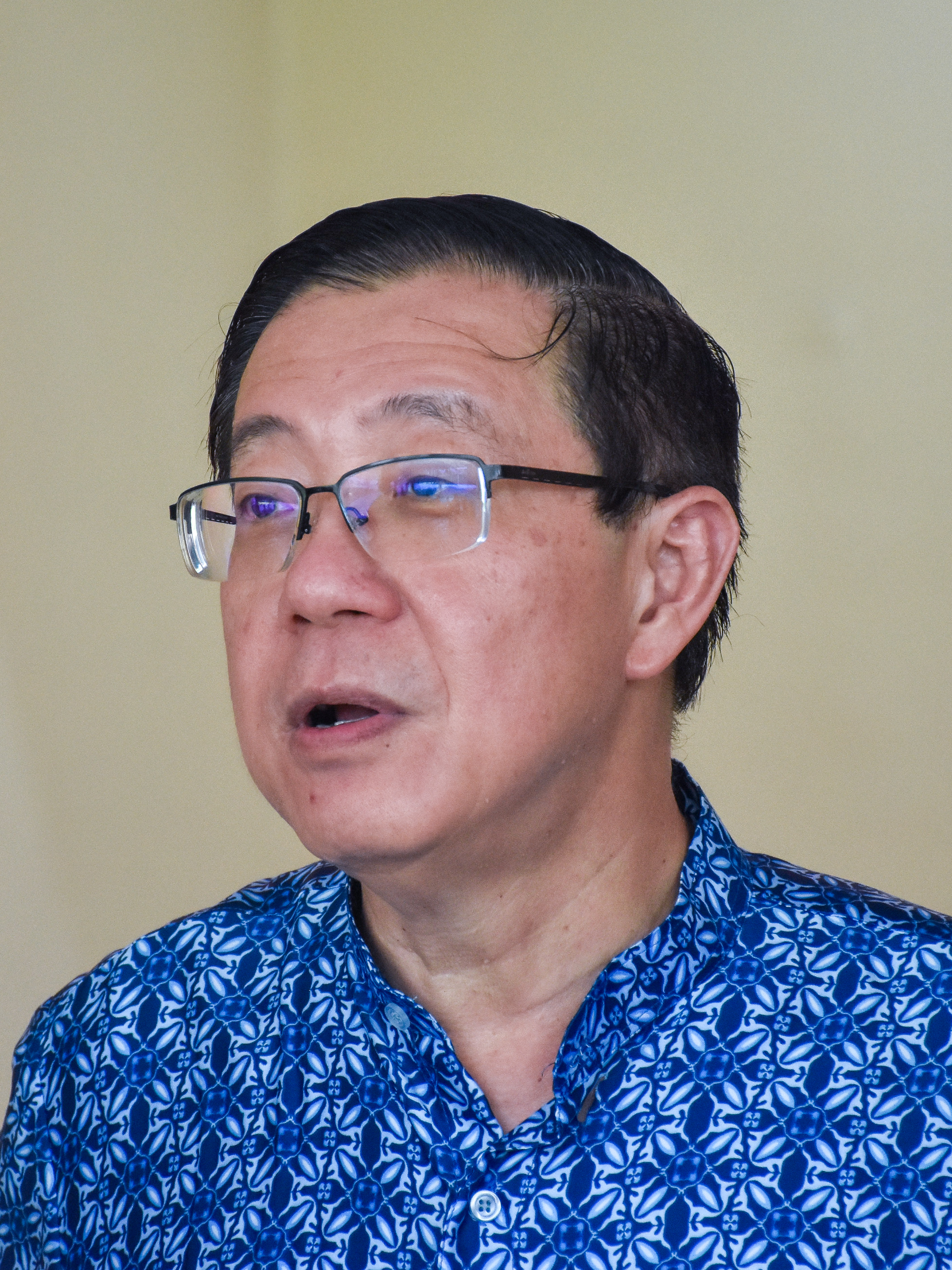
- Lim in 2023

Minister of Finance
- In office 21 May 2018 – 24 February 2020
- Monarchs: Muhammad V (2018–2019); Abdullah (2019–2020)
- Prime Minister: Mahathir Mohamad
- Deputy: Amiruddin Hamzah
- Preceded by: Najib Razak
- Succeeded by: Tengku Zafrul Aziz
- Constituency: Bagan

4th Chief Minister of Penang
- In office 11 March 2008 – 14 May 2018
- Governor: Abdul Rahman Abbas
- Deputy: Mohammad Fairus Khairuddin (2008–2009); Ramasamy Palanisamy (2008–2018); Mansor Othman (2009–2013); Mohd Rashid Hasnon (2013–2018)
- Preceded by: Koh Tsu Koon
- Succeeded by: Chow Kon Yeow
- Constituency: Air Putih

Member of the Malaysian Parliament for Bagan
- Incumbent
- Assumed office 8 March 2008
- Preceded by: Lim Hock Seng
- Majority: 22,070 (2008); 34,159 (2013); 43,902 (2018); 49,648 (2022)

Member of the Malaysian Parliament for Kota Melaka
- In office 3 August 1986 – 29 November 1999
- Preceded by: Lim Kit Siang
- Succeeded by: Kerk Kim Hock
- Majority: 17,606 (1986); 14,468 (1990); 4,639 (1995)

Member of the Penang State Legislative Assembly for Air Putih
- Incumbent
- Assumed office 8 March 2008
- Preceded by: Lye Siew Weng (BN–MCA)
- Majority: 4,061 (2008); 7,744 (2013); 7,958 (2018); 7,923 (2023)

Advisor I of the Democratic Action Party
- Incumbent
- Assumed office 16 March 2025 Serving with Tan Kok Wai (Advisor II) (since 23 June 2025)
- National Chairman: Gobind Singh Deo
- Secretary-General: Anthony Loke Siew Fook
- Preceded by: Tan Kok Wai (as Advisor)

5th National Chairman of the Democratic Action Party
- In office 20 March 2022 – 16 March 2025
- Deputy: Gobind Singh Deo
- Secretary-General: Anthony Loke Siew Fook
- Preceded by: Tan Kok Wai
- Succeeded by: Gobind Singh Deo

5th Secretary-General of the Democratic Action Party
- In office 4 September 2004 – 20 March 2022
- Deputy: Chong Eng; Ramasamy Palanisamy; Ngeh Koo Ham; Teresa Kok Suh Sim; Nga Kor Ming; Sivakumar Varatharaju
- National Chairman: Karpal Singh (2004–2014); Tan Kok Wai (2014–2022)
- Preceded by: Kerk Kim Hock
- Succeeded by: Anthony Loke Siew Fook

Personal details
- Born: 8 December 1960 (age 65) Johor Bahru, Johor, Federation of Malaya
- Citizenship: Malaysia
- Party: Democratic Action Party
- Other political affiliations: Gagasan Rakyat (1990–1996); Barisan Alternatif (1999–2004); Pakatan Rakyat (2008–2015); Pakatan Harapan (since 2015)
- Spouse: Betty Chew Gek Cheng
- Relations: Lim Hui Ying (sister)
- Children: 4 (3 sons & 1 daughter)
- Parents: Lim Kit Siang (father); Neo Yoke Tee (mother)
- Education: Batu Pahat High School; Malacca High School
- Alma mater: Monash University (BEc)
- Occupation: Politician; accountant
- Website: limguaneng.com

Lim Guan Eng (Chinese: 林冠英; pinyin: Lín Guānyīng; Pe̍h-ōe-jī: Lîm Koàn-eng; born 8 December 1960) is a Malaysian politician and accountant who served as the Minister of Finance of Malaysia from 2018 to 2020. A member of the Democratic Action Party (DAP), he has served as the party's second advisor since 2025.

Lim has served as Member of Parliament (MP) for Bagan, Member of the Penang State Legislative Assembly (MLA) for Air Putih since March 2008. He also served as the 4th Chief Minister of Penang from March 2008 to May 2018, MP for Kota Melaka from August 1986 to November 1999 and 4th Secretary-General of DAP from September 2004 to March 2022.

== Early life and education ==
Lim is the son of Lim Kit Siang, Leader of the Opposition in the Malaysian House of Representatives from 1973 to 1999 and 2004 to 2008. Lim attended La Salle Primary English School in Petaling Jaya, and later the Batu Pahat Montfort Primary English School. For his secondary education, he attended Batu Pahat High School and Malacca High School. He graduated from Monash University in Australia with a Bachelor of Economics (BEc). He also served as the president of MUISS (Monash University International Student Society) during his university years.

== Political career ==
Prior to his political career, Lim was a senior executive at a bank. He was first elected as the Member of Parliament for Kota Melaka in 1986, defeating Soh Chin Ann with a majority of 17,606 votes. He was re-elected in the 1990 and 1995 general elections, albeit with reduced majorities. He thus became the first person to be elected to three consecutive terms in Kota Melaka. He was also the first Malacca High School alumnus to achieve this.

He was appointed the DAP Socialist Youth chairman in 1989 and was formally elected to that post in 1992. In 1995, he was elected the DAP Deputy Secretary-General. He was elected the party's Secretary-General in 2004, and held that position until 2022. The same year, he was elected as National Chairman of the party.

In 2005, Lim suffered a surprise defeat in his campaign for re-election to the Malacca DAP committee. However, as Lim remained Secretary-General of the party, he was automatically included in the committee in accordance with the party's constitution. His wife, who had also failed to be elected to the Melaka committee, was not included in the committee even though she remained the chief of the state's DAP women's wing.^{[1]} Teresa Kok, a DAP MP, suggested that there was a conspiracy behind the Lims' failure to be reelected. Nevertheless, Lim went on to garner the second highest number of votes (620) at the party's 15th National Congress on 23 August 2008.

In 2014, he was criticized for swapping his two-month-old Toyota Camry official car for a new Mercedes-Benz S300L. Netizens and NGOs commented that he did not practise what he preached because in 2008 he had condemned the Terengganu State Government for buying a fleet of Mercedes-Benz cars as its official cars. Abdul Rahman Dahlan, the Kota Belud Barisan Nasional MP, accused Lim of being "hypocritical". Lim defended his decision, saying that he had bought the car at a discounted price.

On 20 September 2011, Lim Guan Eng participated in an interview conducted by Australian Broadcasting Corporation where he was reported by the Malaysian news agency, Bernama, to have disparaged the security of the state of Johor. Lim Guan Eng insisted he never mentioned Johor, and demanded that Bernama retract their story and issue a formal apology, or face a lawsuit. However, a recording was later revealed by TV3, showing clear evidence of Lim Guan Eng proclaiming that Singaporeans who are in Johor are "likely to be kidnapped". The recording of Lim Guan Eng's remark was made in Singapore. This led Lim Guan Eng to issue a formal apology to the Sultan of Johor.

=== Chief Minister of Penang ===
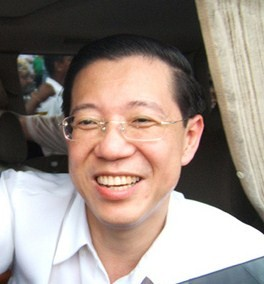
Lim in 2008

In the 2008 Malaysian general election, the DAP-PKR-PAS coalition, later known as Pakatan Rakyat (PR), won 29 out of the 40 state assembly seats contested in Penang, defeating the Barisan Nasional (BN) coalition. The DAP won 19 seats, PKR 9 seats, and PAS 1. Even though Lim is not a Penangite, he was nominated to be the Chief Minister (CM) of Penang, replacing the former Chief Minister Dr. Koh Tsu Koon of Malaysian People's Movement Party (Gerakan). Other senior DAP leaders of Penang such as Lim Hock Seng, Phee Boon Poh, and Chow Kon Yeow were bypassed and were instead appointed state executive council members. In the 2013 Malaysian general election, Pakatan Rakyat increased their majority, gaining 30 out of the 40 state seats in Penang.

==== Domestic issues ====
Upon taking over as the new Chief Minister of Penang, Lim announced an amnesty on all summonses issued by the Penang Island City Council and Seberang Perai Municipal Council involving vendors' licences and parking offences issued before March 2008.

During Lim's tenure, Penang maintained its rank as one of the top states for investments in Malaysia. In 2014, Penang recorded a total of RM8.16 billion in investments, a 109% increase compared to the previous year.

Under Lim, the concept of Competency, Accountability, and Transparency (CAT) was emphasised in state governance. The Economist credited state reforms with ending cronyism and corruption that led to major deficits under preceding administrations.

The state government also received praise from the auditor-general as the best financially managed state in Malaysia from 2008 to 2010. It also won accolades from Transparency International for implementing open tenders in awarding contracts.

The state's record budget surpluses were channeled to social welfare programs such as financial aid to the hardcore poor, cash handouts to the elderly, public housing upgrades, free Wi-Fi service at selected hotspots, and free bus services within the city and between Penang island and Seberang Perai for workers.

With the goal of transforming Penang into a sustainable city, the state government launched the "Cleaner, Greener Penang" initiative in 2010. Free plastic bags were banned throughout the state and proceeds from a levy on the use of plastic bags would be channeled as aid to the state's hardcore poor. The state also prohibited motor vehicles from using particular stretches of road in the city on Sundays, and later introduced a bike sharing system.

Efforts were also undertaken to resolve the transportation issues in the state, with a memorandum of understanding being signed with China relating to a proposal to construct three roads and an undersea tunnel on Penang Island in 2011. The 6.5 km undersea tunnel is intended to be the third link between the island and Butterworth on the mainland, meant to ease traffic congestion and improve links between the island and the mainland.

In 2014, the Penang Transport Master Plan (PTMP), a RM27 billion project to develop an integrated transportation network combining various modes of transport, including rapid transit and water taxis, connecting the island and the mainland was announced. The project was expected to start in 2015 and be completed in 2030.

In 2015, the state capital of George Town was granted city status, which it had lost in 1974. It now encompasses the entirety of Penang Island and surrounding islets and is governed by the Penang Island City Council.

The same year, the state government launched the Penang Future Foundation (PFF) scholarship program, which awards scholarships to outstanding young Malaysian students who wish to pursue their undergraduate studies at local private higher educational institutions. The program was launched to attract younger talent to the state and requires recipients to work in Penang.

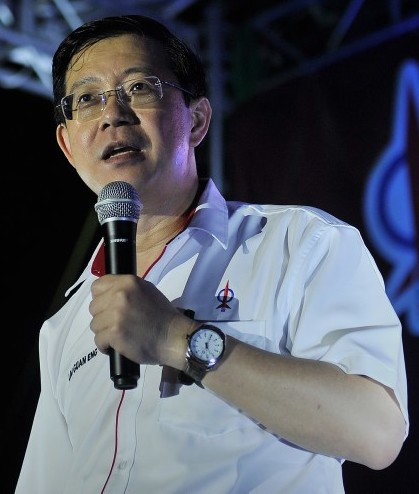
Lim giving a speech in 2013

==== Foreign delegations and state visits ====
On 6 November 2011, the Penang state government under Lim's leadership managed to strengthen ties and forge friendship with the state of Victoria, Australia when the Governor of Victoria Alex Chernov made an official day-long visit to Penang with the invitation of the state government.

On 15 November 2011 Penang had hosted an official visit by the Governor General of Canada the Right Honourable David Johnston and the ex-Speaker of the Kanagawa Prefecture of Japan for 2 days. Penang had managed to forge foreign relations with Canada and Japan, which consequently strengthened trade ties to lure foreign investors to Penang. Johnston's first visit to the state was welcomed by Lim and the Yang di-Pertua Negeri of Penang Abdul Rahman Abbas. They walked around the Penang Heritage Trail together with his delegation.

Several investment and business delegations have been led by Lim on state visits to Tokyo, Bangkok, Singapore, Melbourne, Adelaide, Abu Dhabi and Dubai. Lim's official visit to Bangkok also witnessed the signing of a Memorandum of Understanding (MOU) between Penang and Bangkok, which enabled Penang to be a fast-growing world-class and international city. Prior to this state visit, Penang was looking to develop its tourism by seeking co-operation with Bangkok. Lim said that the state aspires to be achieve global city status by becoming a major economic hub, a top choice for investors, a desirable place for tourists and a habitat of choice for people who want to earn a sustainable living.

In 2013, his official trip to Xiamen and Hainan in China with a delegation including his wife was criticised by the Penang MCA for practicing double standard in his stand for bringing his spouse on an official trip. Penang MCA Secretary, Lau Chiek Tan said "Previously, Lim had criticised Barisan Nasional leaders for wasting public funds by bringing their families with them on official trips. We now see Pakatan Rakyat leaders doing the same with this trip to China."

=== Minister of Finance ===
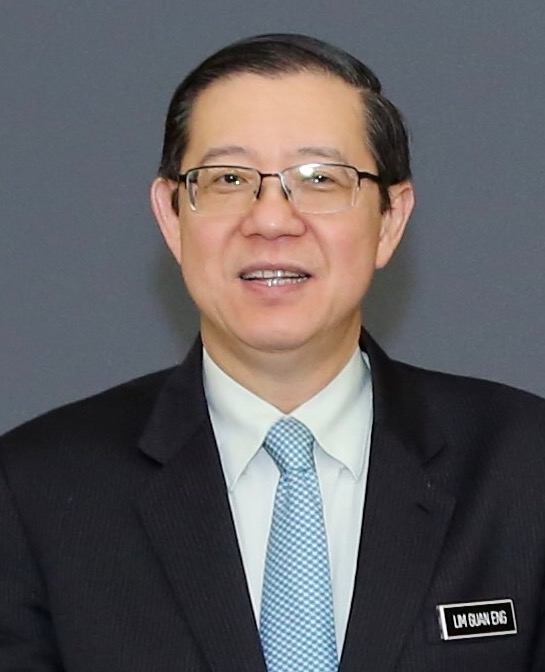
Lim in 2019

Following the electoral victory of the Pakatan Harapan (PH) coalition of which the DAP is a part of in the 2018 Malaysian general election, Mahathir Mohamad announced Lim's appointment as the Minister of Finance. He was the first ethnic-Chinese Malaysian to hold the position since Tan Siew Sin of the Malaysian Chinese Association (MCA) who held that position from 1959 to 1974. In June 2018, he received criticism for issuing official statements in Chinese.

In September 2018, Lim cancelled two contracts, worth approximately $2.795 billion, with the China Petroleum Pipeline Bureau for oil and gas pipelines, as part of Mahatir's agenda to cut excessive spending and re-examine the "unequal treaties" between Malaysia and China. The ministry also alleged that part of the funds for these projects, which were secured from the Export–Import Bank of China, had been misappropriated as part of the 1MDB scandal.

In December the same year, Lim announced a B40 National Protection Scheme, a free national health insurance scheme for the country's bottom 40 percentile of earners. The scheme, which was to start from 1 January 2019, would cost an initial RM2 billion. He also announced an exemption from stamp duty for properties up to RM1 million for first-time home buyers beginning 1 January 2019.

On 21 June 2019, Lim claimed that Sarawak would go bankrupt in three years' time if it continues to be ruled by the Gabungan Parti Sarawak (GPS) coalition. He stated that Sarawak's reserves of RM30 billion would be depleted within three years, considering the state's annual budget of RM11 billion. Lim also expressed concerns that Sarawak might face a situation similar to Kelantan, where he claimed they struggled to cover the salaries of their civil servants due to ineffective administration.

The statement by him has sparked controversy. The Sarawak government, through its Ministry of Finance and Economic Planning, issued a statement expressing that Lim's remarks not only contain misinformation but also carry political motivations. Sarawak Chief Minister Abang Johari said the statement pointed out that these assumptions were made without taking into account Sarawak's revenue from various sources, including oil and gas, and the exemplary financial management it has demonstrated. Movement for Change, Sarawak (MoCS) has described Lim's statement as ‘an insult to Sarawak and Sarawakians’.

As a result of the collaboration between Pakatan Harapan and GPS after the 2022 general election, Lim publicly apologized for his previous remarks that had harmed the reputation of Abang Johari and the Sarawak government.

Following the 2020–2022 Malaysian political crisis, which saw the fall of the Pakatan Harapan government, Lim revealed that Mahathir had threatened to remove him from his position as minister of finance on three separate occasions, each following Lim's decision to pursue policies that Mahathir disagreed with, but did not follow through as Lim had the backing of the rest of the cabinet on all three policies. This followed claims made by Mahathir that he could not be controlled by the DAP during his time as prime minister, and that Lim had to ask him for permission before undertaking any plans.

=== DAP National Chairman and Advisor ===
Lim was elected DAP National Chairman at the party's 17th National Congress, where he was also re-elected into the Central Executive Committee with the 8th highest share of votes, numbering 1,311 votes. He was replaced as secretary-general, a role which he had occupied for 17 years, by Anthony Loke Siew Fook.

In the lead-up to the party's 18th National Congress, Lim faced calls to withdraw from the leadership race owing to discontent among the party's grassroots over his leadership as well as his clashes with other party leaders. Analysts have also characterised the congress as a battle between the party's traditionalists, who would prefer to retain the party's Chinese character, and the moderates, who are more open to cooperating with Malay-based parties. Lim was narrowly re-elected to the Central Executive Committee, placing 26th out of 30, garnering 1,719 votes, and failed to be re-appointed the party's National Chairman. Instead, he was offered the role of Advisor. His former deputy Gobind Singh Deo replaced him. The Chinese language newspaper Sin Chew Daily characterised the election, which saw the failure of much of Lim's faction, including his sister Lim Hui Ying, to enter the CEC as the end of the preeminence of the "Lim dynasty" within the party.

== Legal issues ==
=== Below-market price bungalow purchase ===
In 2015, Lim allegedly used his position as then Penang chief minister to gain gratification for himself and his wife, Betty Chew Gek Cheng, by approving the application for conversion of agricultural land to a public housing zone in Balik Pulau to a company, Magnificent Emblem Sdn Bhd, owned by Phang Li Koon. In 2016, Lim allegedly used his position to obtain a plot of land and bungalow at 25, Jalan Pinhorn, from Phang for RM2.8 million, at below market value. The market price for the land and bungalow at that time was RM4.27 million. Lim knew Phang had a formal relationship with him. He allegedly carried out the offense at the bungalow in Jalan Pinhorn.

On 29 June 2016, Lim is arrested at his office by MACC on the 28th floor of Komtar at 5.45pm, while Phang is arrested at 4.15pm at her sixth-floor office in Penang Garden. On 30 June 2016, Lim and Phang are charged with corruption in the George Town Sessions Court. The case is transferred to the High Court under Section 60 of the MACC Act, which allows the prosecution to transfer the case to the High Court tor hearing. Lim faces two charges - one under Section 23 of the MACC Act and the other under Section 165 of the Penal Code.

On 26 March 2018, the first day of trial, Lim and Phang plead not guilt to the amended charges read out before judge Hadhariah. First witness to be called is blogger Muhsin Lahteef, known as Mamu Parpu, who testifies about the report he lodged to MACC about the case on 18 March 2016. It is reported at least seven witnesses will be called that day, with 54 witnesses to be called in the next five weeks.

On 9 April 2018, the High Court postpones the trial to 21 May, following a defence application that Lim needs to prepare for the 14th General Election. On 9 May 2018, Pakatan Harapan wins GE14, which ends Barisan Nasional's 61-year grip on power. On 12 May 2018, Prime Minister Mahathir Mohamad names Lim as finance minister. On 13 May 2018, Mahathir says Lim can be officially appointed finance minister only if he clears his corruption case. Mahathir clarifies that Lim has merely been named finance minister, but has yet to take his oath of office.

On 3 September 2018, the court grants Lim and Phang a discharge amounting to an acquittal.

=== Consortium Zenith corruption charge ===
On 6 August 2020, Lim Guan Eng was accused of using his position as chief minister to ask Consortium Zenith Construction Sdn Bhd (Zenith) senior director Zarul Ahmad Mohd Zulkifli for 10% of the profits which would be made from the roads and tunnel project. He was charged under Section 16(a)(A) of the Malaysian Anti Corruption Commission Act. He pleaded not guilty in the Sessions Court of asking for a 10% cut from the profits of the undersea tunnel project.

On 6 August 2020, Lim Guan Eng was arrested by the Malaysian Anti-Corruption Commission, following weeks of a probe into an RM6.3 billion undersea tunnel project that was green-lit during his tenure as Penang Chief Minister. According to the commission, Lim will be charged with bribery and abuse of power relating to the undersea tunnel project, and a separate abuse of power charge for the additional unspecified case.

On 10 August 2020, Lim was charged with receiving a bribe worth RM3.3 million in relation to the Penang undersea tunnel project. This is the second charge that was also related to the same project.

On 5 August 2021, Ewe Swee Kheng, a property developer and one of the witnesses for the prosecution, allegedly fell to his death from his apartment.

On 4 August 2022, Consortium Zenith Construction Sdn Bhd (Zenith) senior director Zarul Ahmad Mohd Zulkifli told the Kuala Lumpur Sessions Court that he had lied to the press via media statements issued to reporters in 2018 after being remanded by MACC. He admitted that everything involving the undersea tunnel project was "done above the board" and the project involved no corruption during a cross-examination by Lim's lawyer Gobind Singh Deo. Zarul also informed the court that the company was forced to protect its interests by paying fees to people who claimed to represent the then Prime Minister Najib Razak.

=== Penang Voluntary Patrol Unit ===
Lim was involved in a controversy regarding the establishment of the Penang Voluntary Patrol Unit (PPS) which was declared illegal by Ministry of Home Affairs. He however, declared it a legal entity and challenged Khalid Abu Bakar, who was the then-Malaysia's Inspector-General of Police to a debate on the legitimacy of the PPS. He then challenged the Home Ministry's declaration in court. His case however, was thrown out of court by the High Court. However, on 28 March 2017, the Court of Appeal ruled that the Penang Voluntary Patrol Unit (PPS) is a legal organisation established by the Penang state government.

=== 'Green wave' statement ===
On 7 July 2023, Lim warned Penang voters not to allow the "green wave" to take hold in the state. He said that the "green wave" would have resulted in the destruction of Buddhist temples and the restriction of certain practices for non-Muslims.

He has been accused by opposition leaders of fearmongering Penang voters against the Malaysian Islamic Party (PAS) by intentionally raising the 3R issues (Rulers, race, religion). PAS Secretary-General Takiyuddin Hassan said the party strongly condemned the extreme provocation and incitement of extraordinary hatred by Lim. Manjoi assemblyman Mohd Hafez Sabri wants the police to investigate Lim for his remarks.

Kedah police chief Fisol Salleh said a total 23 police reports have been lodged related to Lim's statement in the state. Bukit Aman also said investigations into a speech made Lim have started. Lim said he was ready to cooperate with the authorities if asked to have his statement recorded. On 14 July, Inspector General of Police (IGP) Razarudin Husain said the police have recorded statements from Lim for his alleged remarks on the 3R issue.

=== Defamation suits ===
On 14 December 2011, Lim won a second defamation suit against Malay daily Utusan Malaysia, which was ordered by the Penang High Court to pay a total of RM200,000 worth of damages and a cost of RM25,000 to him. Utusan Malaysia had allegedly published a defamatory news article about Lim entitled "Kebiadapan Guan Eng" (Guan Eng's Arrogance) which had defamed his political career, and subsequently pictured him and DAP as anti-Malay and anti-Muslim.

On 22 June 2012, Lim won a defamation suit against Utusan Malaysia, which was ordered by High Court to pay a total of RM200,000 worth of damages and RM20,000 in costs to the former. The Malay daily had been found guilty by the court of defaming Lim in a published news article headlined "Tiada Lagi DEB" (No More NEP), which said that Lim would abolish the New Economic Policy.

In December 2013 an article quoting Jimmy Lim entitled "Guan Eng has failed, says NGO", about what he characterised as the destruction of Malaysian heritage in developments schemes carried out under the government of Lim Guan Eng, was published on the Malaysian online news portal Free Malaysia Today. Lim Guan Eng then sued Jimmy Lim as well as other parties alleging defamation, and in August 2013 received a decision at the George Town High Court in his favour ordering the defendants to pay RM300,000 in damages and RM30,000 in legal costs. This decision, however, was overturned in 2016 on appeal to the Malaysian Court of Appeal, on the grounds that the article taken as a whole was not defamatory. Judge Hamid Sultan Abu Backer, the chair of the court, described the article as "written in a temperate tone".

On 30 January 2015, he, with two news portals, Malaysiakini and The Malaysian Insider were sued by Penang UMNO State Secretary, Musa Sheikh Fadzir, Maison Height Sdn Bhd and Penang Barisan Nasional secretary Omar Faudzar for making defamatory article on the alleged sale of Malay lands for profit. In the statement of claim, the plaintiffs referred to an article written by Lim titled "Pembohongan Umno" (Umno's lies), which was published in The Malaysian Insider on 27 November 2014, and another article titled "Stop spreading lies about Penang government, Guan Eng tells Umno" which was also published in the same news portal on 27 November. The plaintiffs stated that Lim, Mkini and Gan had caused the publication of another article "UMNO made profits by selling Malay Kampungs", containing defamatory words in Malaysiakini. The plaintiffs filed a notice of discontinuance on 1 April 2016.

On 26 March 2015, Lim won a defamation suit against Perkasa, New Straits Times and Utusan Malaysia concerning an article over a dinner which Lim attended in Singapore in 2011. The latter were ordered by the High Court to pay RM550,000 in damages. Justice Nor Bee Ariffin ordered Perkasa President Ibrahim Ali, information chief Ruslan Kassim and Perkasa to pay RM150,000; New Straits Times former group editor Datuk Syed Nazri Syed Harun and NSTP RM200,000 and Utusan Melayu group editor-in-chief Abdul Aziz Ishak and Utusan Melayu RM200,000. Justice Nor Bee Ariffin said that Syed Nazri, NSTP, Abdul Aziz and Utusan Melayu failed to practice responsible journalism.

On 3 July 2015, he lost a lawsuit brought by the state opposition leader, Jahara Hamid. Lim had allegedly called Datuk Jahara a "racist grandmother" in December 2013. Lim was ordered to pay RM 500,000 in damages at 5% interest per annum and RM 40,000 in legal costs. He was also ordered to retract the statement. The judicial commissioner said that he had been unprofessional (as a chief minister) to resort to name calling an opposition leader and had brought disrepute to both the state assembly and the office of Chief Minister. His sexist statement was also condemned by the Women Chief of DAP, Chong Eng; Women Chief of Parti Keadilan Rakyat (PKR), Zuraida Kamaruddin; and several female Senators.

In August 2017, Lim filed a suit against New Straits Times Press (Malaysia) Bhd (NSTP) for running an article titled "Political Intervention was real, says PAS", which accused him of interfering in Islamic affairs. On 2 November 2018, the High Court ordered NSTP to pay damages of RM200,000 to Lim and directed NSTP to publish an unconditional and unreserved apology admitting that the article was defamatory to him.

On 19 September 2018, a consent judgment was reached before the High Court with the publisher of the New Straits Times and Berita Harian newspapers agreeing to publish an apology and pay Lim RM130,000 in damages over three defamatory articles published in January 2018, quoting Teng Chang Yeow who accused Lim of lying about Penang government's payments to the contractors of the undersea tunnel and three main roads project.

== Personal life ==
Lim is married to Betty Chew Gek Cheng (周玉清), who was former two-term MLA for Kota Laksamana in Malacca. She is the first serving assemblywoman to be married to a Chief Minister. They have four children. His younger sister, Lim Hui Ying is the MP for Tanjong.

== Election results ==
Parliament of Malaysia
Year	Constituency	Candidate	Votes	Pct	Opponent(s)	Votes	Pct	Ballots cast	Majority	Turnout
1986	P113 Kota Melaka	Lim Guan Eng (DAP)	34,573	67.08%	Soh Chin Ann (MCA)	16,967	32.92%	52,840	17,606	76.54%
1990	P113 Kota Melaka	Lim Guan Eng (DAP)	33,993	63.52%	Soon Tian Szu (MCA)	19,525	36.48%	54,745	14,468	76.45%
1995	P123 Kota Melaka	Lim Guan Eng (DAP)	29,293	54.30%	Soon Tian Szu (MCA)	24,654	45.70%	56,096	4,639	75.91%
2008	P043 Bagan	Lim Guan Eng (DAP)	33,748	74.24%	Song Choy Leng (MCA)	11,678	25.69%	46,227	22,070	77.84%
2013	P043 Bagan	Lim Guan Eng (DAP)	46,466	77.71%	Chua Teik Siang (MCA)	12,307	20.58%	59,796	34,159	87.29%
2013	P043 Bagan	Lim Guan Eng (DAP)	46,466	77.71%	Lim Kim Chu (PCM)	328	0.55%	59,796	34,159	87.29%
2018	P043 Bagan	Lim Guan Eng (DAP)	51,653	85.96%	Lee Beng Seng (MCA)	7,751	12.90%	60,087	43,902	84.70%
2018	P043 Bagan	Lim Guan Eng (DAP)	51,653	85.96%	Huan Cheng Guan (PCM)	502	0.83%	60,087	43,902	84.70%
2018	P043 Bagan	Lim Guan Eng (DAP)	51,653	85.96%	Koay Xing Boon (MUP)	181	0.30%	60,087	43,902	84.70%
2022	P043 Bagan	Lim Guan Eng (DAP)	55,797	81.27%	Alan Oh @ Oh Teik Choon (BERSATU)	6,149	8.96%	69,516	49,648	77.70%
2022	P043 Bagan	Lim Guan Eng (DAP)	55,797	81.27%	Tan Chuan Hong (MCA)	5,385	7.84%	69,516	49,648	77.70%
2022	P043 Bagan	Lim Guan Eng (DAP)	55,797	81.27%	Mohd Hafiz Mohd Abu (IMAN)	1,323	1.93%	69,516	49,648	77.70%

Penang State Legislative Assembly
Year	Constituency	Candidate	Votes	Pct	Opponent(s)	Votes	Pct	Ballots cast	Majority	Turnout
2008	N23 Air Putih	Lim Guan Eng (DAP)	6,601	72.08%	Tan Yoke Cheng (MCA)	2,540	27.74%	9,288	4,061	74.58%
2013	N23 Air Putih	Lim Guan Eng (DAP)	9,626	82.32%	Tan Ken Keong (MCA)	1,882	16.10%	11,693	7,744	84.7%
2018	N23 Air Putih	Lim Guan Eng (DAP)	9,362	85.61%	Tang Heap Seng (MCA)	1,404	12.84%	10,936	7,958	82.0%
2018	N23 Air Putih	Lim Guan Eng (DAP)	9,362	85.61%	Tan Gim Theam (MUP)	87	0.79%	10,936	7,958	82.0%
2018	N23 Air Putih	Lim Guan Eng (DAP)	9,362	85.61%	Manikandan Ramayah (PCM)	83	0.76%	10,936	7,958	82.0%
2023	N23 Air Putih	Lim Guan Eng (DAP)	8,996	85.63%	Koh Cheng Ann (Gerakan)	1,073	10.21%	10,506	7,923	68.35%
2023	N23 Air Putih	Lim Guan Eng (DAP)	8,996	85.63%	Teh Yee Cheu (PRM)	473	4.16%	10,506	7,923	68.35%

== Honours ==
=== Honours of Malaysia ===
- Malaysia
  - Recipient of the 17th Yang di-Pertuan Agong Installation Medal (2025)

== See also ==
- Members of the Malaysian Parliament who represented multiple states
- 1994 Malacca rape scandal

== Notes ==
1. ^{a} – "Guan Eng and wife voted out of Malacca DAP committee".
2. – Beh "Mr and Mrs Lim's defeat a 'conspiracy'".
3. – "Lim Guan Eng Reassures Penang".

== Citations ==
- "Guan Eng and wife voted out of Malacca DAP committee". (19 December 2005). The Star.
- Beh, Lih Yi (19 December 2005). "Mr and Mrs Lim's defeat a 'conspiracy'". Malaysiakini.
- "The trial of opposition parliamentarian Lim Guan Eng: an update". (1 March 1997). Amnesty International.
- "Lim Guan Eng released but his civil rights remain curtailed". (25 August 1999). Amnesty International.
- Lim Guan Eng Biodata
- TheStar Article

Political offices
Preceded by Najib Razak	Minister of Finance; 2018–2020	Succeeded by Tengku Zafrul Aziz
Preceded by Koh Tsu Koon	Chief Minister of Penang; 2008–2018	Succeeded by Chow Kon Yeow
Parliament of Malaysia
Preceded by Lim Kit Siang	Member of Parliament for Melaka City; 1986–1999	Succeeded by Kerk Kim Hock
Preceded by Lim Hock Seng	Member of Parliament for Bagan; 2008–present	Incumbent
Preceded by Lye Siew Weng	Penang State Assemblyman for Air Putih; 2008–present	Incumbent
Party political offices
Preceded by Kerk Kim Hock	5th Secretary-General of DAP; 2004–present	Incumbent
