= 2004 Malaysian general election =

- 21 March 2004

All 219 seats in the Dewan Rakyat 110 seats needed for a majority
- Registered: 9,755,097 (▲2.19%)
- Turnout: 72.95% (▲1.76pp)
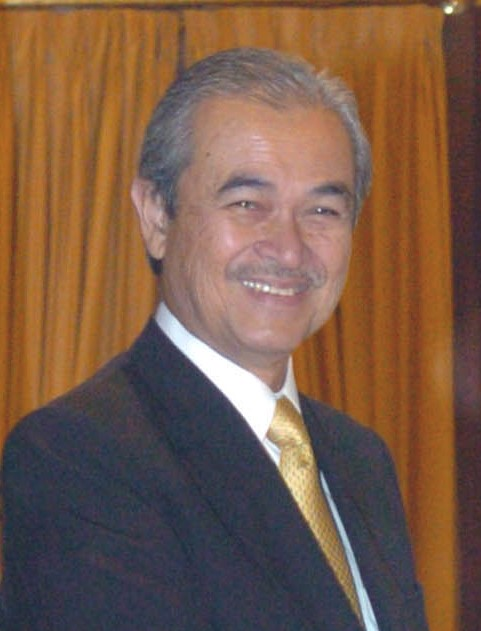

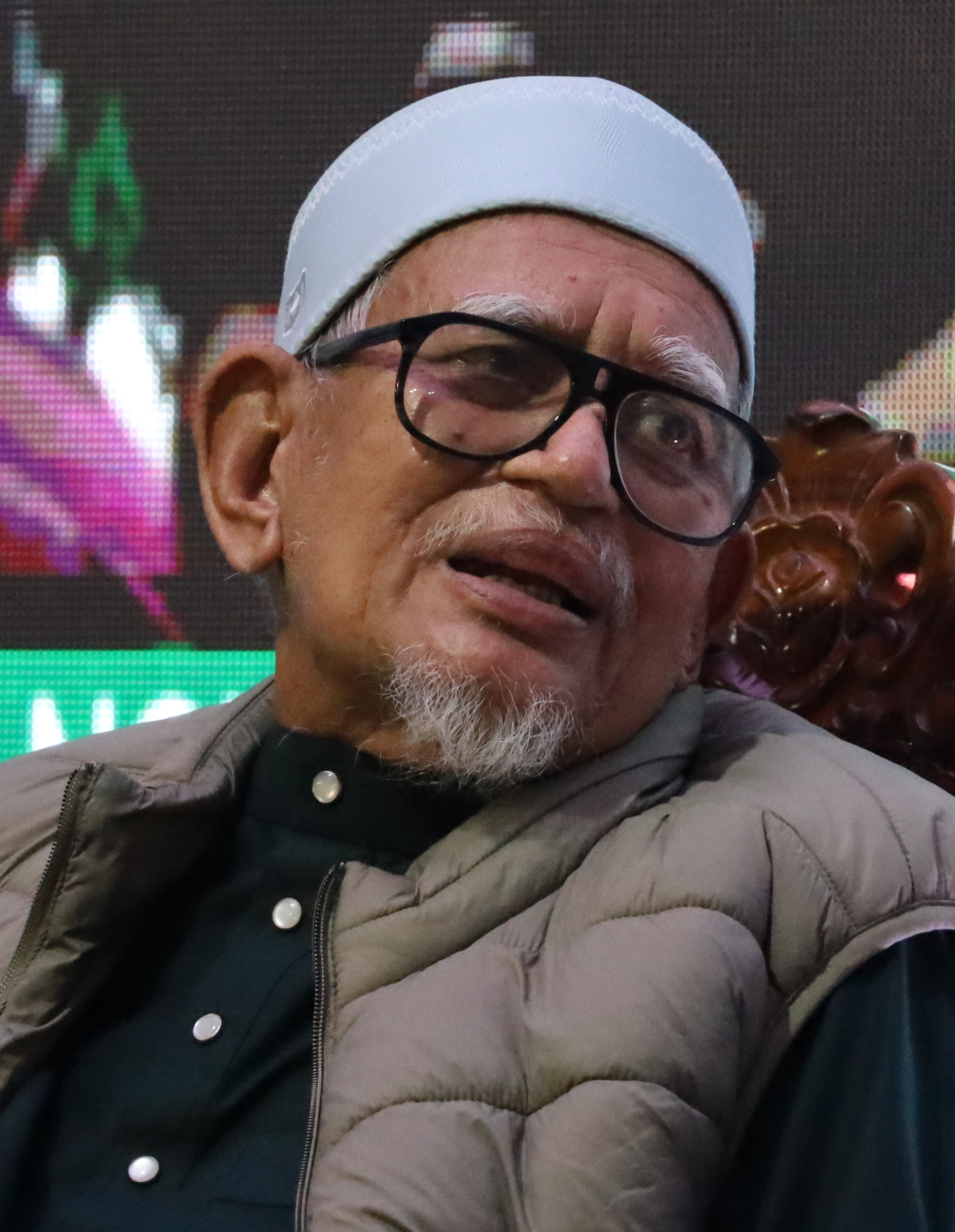
	First party	Second party	Third party
Leader	Abdullah Ahmad Badawi	Kerk Kim Hock	Abdul Hadi Awang
Party	UMNO	DAP	PAS
Alliance	Barisan Nasional	–	Barisan Alternatif
Last election	56.52%, 148 seats	12.74%, 10 seats	40.28%, 42 seats
Seats won	198	12	8
Seat change	▲50	▲2	▼34
Popular vote	4,437,919	687,350	1,672,350
Percentage	63.82%	9.88%	24.05%
Swing	▲7.30pp	▼2.86pp	▼16.23pp
- Results by constituency
Prime Minister before election
Abdullah Ahmad Badawi
BN
Prime Minister-designate
Abdullah Ahmad Badawi
BN

General elections were held in Malaysia on Sunday, 21 March 2004. Voting took place in all 219 parliamentary constituencies, each electing one Member of Parliament to the Dewan Rakyat, the dominant house of Parliament. They were the first elections for Abdullah Ahmad Badawi as Prime Minister following his appointment in 2003. State elections also took place in 505 state constituencies in twelve of the thirteen states (except Sarawak) on the same day, which also marked the first time Sabah held its state election parallel with the other states of Peninsular Malaysia.

The result was a landslide victory for the Barisan Nasional (BN) coalition, which received 64% of the vote (and would have gained a higher vote had all seats been contested) and won 198 seats to the combined opposition parties' 20 seats, with one independent. This was the largest majority that BN had won since 1978. The dominant party in BN, the United Malays National Organisation (UMNO), won 109 seats, a gain of 37. UMNO's allies also gained seats; the Malaysian Chinese Association (MCA) won 31 seats, a gain of two, and the Malaysian Indian Congress (MIC) won nine seats, a gain of two.

The Pan-Malaysian Islamic Party (PAS) managed to retain only seven of its 27 seats. PAS ran on a platform promising an Islamic state, which turned off many moderate voters. In addition, the PAS leader, Abdul Hadi Awang, lost his parliamentary seat. Another opposition party, the People's Justice Party (PKR), lost four of its five seats. After five recounts, the party's leader, Wan Azizah Wan Ismail (the wife of imprisoned former Deputy Prime Minister Anwar Ibrahim), retained her seat with a majority of just 590 votes.

The third opposition party, the Democratic Action Party (DAP), which was routed in the 1999 elections, improved its performance with the re-election of party chairman Lim Kit Siang in Ipoh Timor seat and his deputy, Karpal Singh in Bukit Gelugor seat although party secretary-general Kerk Kim Hock lost his seat. The DAP won 12 seats and regained the official leadership of the opposition in the national parliament from PAS. Most candidates who campaigned on platforms of Islamic issues lost their seats. This was a significant turnaround compared to the previous elections, where generally the more "Islamic" candidates had a greater chance of winning in the Malay heartland.

== Background ==
On 2 March, the tenth national parliament and all state assemblies in Malaysia (with the exception of Sarawak) were dissolved by the Yang di-Pertuan Agong upon the advice of the Prime Minister. Sarawak's last state election was held in 2001, and elections for the state assembly were not due till 2006.

The elections were held nine months earlier than required by the constitution. The constitution allowed for a parliamentary term of up to five years. Elections were required to be called three months after parliament is dissolved. The government had until the end of November 2004 to call elections.

== Campaign ==
Candidates were nominated on 13 March, with the National Front winning 15 seats uncontested, and another two seats after the opposing candidates withdrew. The right to withdraw was only introduced as a new rule at these elections. Under this rule candidates are allowed a three-day period to withdraw following nomination day. Of the 17 parliamentary seats won uncontested, nine were in the state of Sabah, six in Sarawak and two in Johor.

PAS won a state assembly seat Senggarang in Johor for the first time, after the National Front candidate was disqualified because she was seconded by someone who was not a registered voter in the constituency that she wanted to contest. The requirement that the seconder be registered in the same constituency was only introduced in 2004. This seat was influenced by other opposition parties to gain many state seat in 2008 contest.

== Conduct ==
The elections were marred by discrepancies, which were admitted by the electoral authorities. The head of the Election Commission, Ab Rashid Ab Rahman, made the statement "I have been in this line for so long... it should not have happened at all. There must be reasons why this happened." He has served in the election commission for the last five elections, and has stated that he intends to resign if a report on the discrepancies implicates him in the foul-ups.

Among the discrepancies were wrongly printed ballots, registered voters being unable to vote and wide discrepancies in votes in various seats upon re-counting the ballots.

In the seat of Sungai Lembing in state of Pahang, the Keadilan symbol was printed wrongly on the ballot paper for PAS candidate Idris Ahmad. Illiterate voters tend to rely on familiar party symbols for voting purposes as they are unable to read the candidate's names on the ballot. Voting was suspended for 5 hours before resuming. Polling was re-held for the seat on 28 March.

== Results ==
Party or alliance		Votes	%	Seats	+/–
Barisan Nasional	United Malays National Organisation	2,483,259	35.71	109	+37
Barisan Nasional	Malaysian Chinese Association	1,074,230	15.45	31	+2
Barisan Nasional	Parti Gerakan Rakyat Malaysia	257,663	3.71	10	+4
Barisan Nasional	Malaysian Indian Congress	221,546	3.19	9	+2
Barisan Nasional	Sarawak United Peoples' Party	102,057	1.47	6	–1
Barisan Nasional	Parti Pesaka Bumiputera Bersatu	80,408	1.16	11	0
Barisan Nasional	UPKO	55,117	0.79	4	+1
Barisan Nasional	Sarawak Progressive Democratic Party	49,483	0.71	4	New
Barisan Nasional	Parti Bansa Dayak Sarawak	46,292	0.67	6	0
Barisan Nasional	United Sabah Party	26,504	0.38	4	+1
Barisan Nasional	People's Progressive Party	20,129	0.29	1	+1
Barisan Nasional	Liberal Democratic Party	8,208	0.12	0	–1
Barisan Nasional	Sabah Progressive Party	7,143	0.10	2	0
Barisan Nasional	Parti Bersatu Rakyat Sabah	5,880	0.08	1	+1
Barisan Nasional	Total	4,437,919	63.82	198	+50
Barisan Alternatif	Pan-Malaysian Islamic Party	1,062,078	15.27	7	–20
Barisan Alternatif	People's Justice Party	617,169	8.88	1	–4
Barisan Alternatif	Total	1,672,350	24.05	8	–34
Democratic Action Party		687,350	9.88	12	+2
Sarawak National Party		28,481	0.41	0	–4
State Reform Party		6,270	0.09	0	0
United Democratic Sabah People's Power Party		2,143	0.03	0	New
Malaysian Democratic Party		1,107	0.02	0	0
United Pasok Nunukragang National Organisation		543	0.01	0	New
Independents		110,567	1.59	1	+1
Total		6,953,627	100.00	219	+26
Valid votes		6,953,627	97.71		
Invalid/blank votes		163,190	2.29		
Total votes		7,116,817	100.00		
Registered voters/turnout		9,755,097	72.95		
Source: CLEA, CRISE

=== By state ===
==== Johor ====
Party or alliance		Votes	%	Seats	+/–
Barisan Nasional	United Malays National Organisation	402,630	47.69	16	+3
Barisan Nasional	Malaysian Chinese Association	232,251	27.51	8	+2
Barisan Nasional	Parti Gerakan Rakyat Malaysia	18,997	2.25	1	New
Barisan Nasional	Malaysian Indian Congress	17,953	2.13	1	0
Barisan Nasional	Total	671,831	79.58	26	+5
Barisan Alternatif	Pan-Malaysian Islamic Party	73,946	8.76	0	0
Barisan Alternatif	People's Justice Party	39,428	4.67	0	0
Barisan Alternatif	Total	113,374	13.43	0	0
Democratic Action Party		59,013	6.99	0	0
Total		844,218	100.00	26	+6
Valid votes		844,218	97.19		
Invalid/blank votes		24,447	2.81		
Total votes		868,665	100.00		
Registered voters/turnout		1,184,788	73.32		

==== Kedah ====
Party or alliance		Votes	%	Seats	+/–
Barisan Nasional	United Malays National Organisation	334,295	51.36	12	+7
Barisan Nasional	Malaysian Chinese Association	54,648	8.40	2	0
Barisan Nasional	Total	388,943	59.76	14	+7
Barisan Alternatif	Pan-Malaysian Islamic Party	184,850	28.40	1	–7
Barisan Alternatif	People's Justice Party	77,102	11.85	0	0
Barisan Alternatif	Total	261,952	40.24	1	–7
Total		650,895	100.00	15	0
Valid votes		650,895	97.92		
Invalid/blank votes		13,795	2.08		
Total votes		664,690	100.00		
Registered voters/turnout		821,901	80.87		

==== Kelantan ====
Party or alliance		Votes	%	Seats	+/–
Barisan Nasional	United Malays National Organisation	262,377	50.12	8	+7
Barisan Alternatif	Pan-Malaysian Islamic Party	202,103	38.61	6	–4
Barisan Alternatif	People's Justice Party	52,824	10.09	0	–3
Barisan Alternatif	Total	254,927	48.70	6	–7
Independents		6,198	1.18	0	0
Total		523,502	100.00	14	0
Valid votes		523,502	97.78		
Invalid/blank votes		11,908	2.22		
Total votes		535,410	100.00		
Registered voters/turnout		662,722	80.79		

==== Kuala Lumpur ====
Party or alliance		Votes	%	Seats
Barisan Nasional	Malaysian Chinese Association	108,545	24.08	2
Barisan Nasional	Parti Gerakan Rakyat Malaysia	78,207	17.35	2
Barisan Nasional	United Malays National Organisation	77,141	17.12	3
Barisan Nasional	Total	263,893	58.55	7
Democratic Action Party		109,339	24.26	4
Barisan Alternatif	People's Justice Party	57,033	12.65	0
Barisan Alternatif	Pan-Malaysian Islamic Party	19,183	4.26	0
Barisan Alternatif	Total	76,216	16.91	0
Malaysian Democratic Party		1,107	0.25	0
Independents		132	0.03	0
Total		450,687	100.00	11
Valid votes		450,687	99.19	
Invalid/blank votes		3,694	0.81	
Total votes		454,381	100.00	
Registered voters/turnout		670,920	67.73	

==== Labuan ====
Party or alliance		Votes	%	Seats	+/–
Barisan Nasional	United Malays National Organisation	11,087	77.68	1	0
Barisan Alternatif	People's Justice Party	3,186	22.32	0	0
Total		14,273	100.00	1	0
Valid votes		14,273	96.69		
Invalid/blank votes		488	3.31		
Total votes		14,761	100.00		
Registered voters/turnout		22,006	67.08		

==== Malacca ====
Party or alliance		Votes	%	Seats	+/–
Barisan Nasional	United Malays National Organisation	121,643	47.41	4	+1
Barisan Nasional	Malaysian Chinese Association	61,137	23.83	2	+1
Barisan Nasional	Total	182,780	71.24	6	+2
Democratic Action Party		38,370	14.96	0	–1
Barisan Alternatif	People's Justice Party	19,761	7.70	0	0
Barisan Alternatif	Pan-Malaysian Islamic Party	15,653	6.10	0	0
Barisan Alternatif	Total	35,414	13.80	0	0
Total		256,564	100.00	6	+1
Valid votes		256,564	96.98		
Invalid/blank votes		7,997	3.02		
Total votes		264,561	100.00		
Registered voters/turnout		345,917	76.48		

==== Negeri Sembilan ====
Party or alliance		Votes	%	Seats	+/–
Barisan Nasional	United Malays National Organisation	121,715	40.17	5	+1
Barisan Nasional	Malaysian Chinese Association	61,551	20.31	2	0
Barisan Nasional	Malaysian Indian Congress	28,494	9.40	1	0
Barisan Nasional	Total	211,760	69.89	8	+1
Barisan Alternatif	Pan-Malaysian Islamic Party	31,010	10.23	0	0
Barisan Alternatif	People's Justice Party	19,480	6.43	0	0
Barisan Alternatif	Total	50,490	16.66	0	0
Democratic Action Party		40,752	13.45	0	0
Total		303,002	100.00	8	+1
Valid votes		303,002	96.86		
Invalid/blank votes		9,828	3.14		
Total votes		312,830	100.00		
Registered voters/turnout		429,786	72.79		

==== Pahang ====
Party or alliance		Votes	%	Seats	+/–
Barisan Nasional	United Malays National Organisation	205,278	48.86	10	+2
Barisan Nasional	Malaysian Chinese Association	68,940	16.41	3	0
Barisan Nasional	Malaysian Indian Congress	10,226	2.43	1	New
Barisan Nasional	Total	284,444	67.71	14	+2
Barisan Alternatif	Pan-Malaysian Islamic Party	79,604	18.95	0	0
Barisan Alternatif	People's Justice Party	31,081	7.40	0	0
Barisan Alternatif	Total	110,685	26.35	0	0
Democratic Action Party		24,991	5.95	0	0
Total		420,120	100.00	14	+3
Valid votes		420,120	97.62		
Invalid/blank votes		10,234	2.38		
Total votes		430,354	100.00		
Registered voters/turnout		570,126	75.48		

==== Penang ====
Party or alliance		Votes	%	Seats	+/–
Barisan Nasional	United Malays National Organisation	108,498	21.71	4	+1
Barisan Nasional	Malaysian Chinese Association	87,822	17.57	1	0
Barisan Nasional	Parti Gerakan Rakyat Malaysia	87,790	17.57	3	+1
Barisan Nasional	Total	284,110	56.85	8	+2
Democratic Action Party		135,125	27.04	4	0
Barisan Alternatif	People's Justice Party	61,410	12.29	1	0
Barisan Alternatif	Pan-Malaysian Islamic Party	19,109	3.82	0	0
Barisan Alternatif	Total	80,519	16.11	1	0
Total		499,754	100.00	13	+2
Valid votes		499,754	97.90		
Invalid/blank votes		10,712	2.10		
Total votes		510,466	100.00		
Registered voters/turnout		672,362	75.92		

==== Perak ====
Party or alliance		Votes	%	Seats	+/–
Barisan Nasional	United Malays National Organisation	182,404	23.82	11	+2
Barisan Nasional	Malaysian Chinese Association	166,378	21.73	4	–2
Barisan Nasional	Parti Gerakan Rakyat Malaysia	51,378	6.71	3	0
Barisan Nasional	Malaysian Indian Congress	35,742	4.67	2	0
Barisan Nasional	People's Progressive Party	20,129	2.63	1	+1
Barisan Nasional	Total	456,031	59.55	21	+1
Barisan Alternatif	Pan-Malaysian Islamic Party	106,022	13.84	0	–2
Barisan Alternatif	People's Justice Party	68,703	8.97	0	0
Barisan Alternatif	Total	174,725	22.82	0	–2
Democratic Action Party		135,056	17.64	3	+2
Total		765,812	100.00	24	+1
Valid votes		765,812	97.21		
Invalid/blank votes		21,969	2.79		
Total votes		787,781	100.00		
Registered voters/turnout		1,170,351	67.31		

==== Perlis ====
Party or alliance		Votes	%	Seats	+/–
Barisan Nasional	United Malays National Organisation	58,188	63.72	3	0
Barisan Alternatif	Pan-Malaysian Islamic Party	33,132	36.28	0	0
Total		91,320	100.00	3	0
Valid votes		91,320	98.12		
Invalid/blank votes		1,753	1.88		
Total votes		93,073	100.00		
Registered voters/turnout		112,482	82.74		

==== Putrajaya ====
Party or alliance		Votes	%	Seats	+/–
Barisan Nasional	United Malays National Organisation	4,086	88.33	1	0
Barisan Alternatif	People's Justice Party	540	11.67	0	0
Total		4,626	100.00	1	0
Valid votes		4,626	99.40		
Invalid/blank votes		28	0.60		
Total votes		4,654	100.00		
Registered voters/turnout		5,079	91.63		

==== Sabah ====
Party or alliance		Votes	%	Seats	+/–
Barisan Nasional	United Malays National Organisation	93,831	30.68	13	–1
Barisan Nasional	UKPO	55,117	18.02	4	New
Barisan Nasional	United Sabah Party	26,504	8.67	4	+1
Barisan Nasional	Liberal Democratic Party	8,208	2.68	0	–1
Barisan Nasional	Sabah Progressive Party	7,143	2.34	2	0
Barisan Nasional	Parti Bersatu Rakyat Sabah	5,880	1.92	1	New
Barisan Nasional	Total	196,683	64.31	24	–1
Barisan Alternatif	People's Justice Party	33,000	10.79	0	0
Democratic Action Party		8,512	2.78	0	0
United Democratic Sabah People's Power Party		2,143	0.70	0	New
United Pasok Nunukragang National Organisation		543	0.18	0	New
Independents		64,947	21.24	1	+1
Total		305,828	100.00	25	+5
Valid votes		305,828	96.36		
Invalid/blank votes		11,559	3.64		
Total votes		317,387	100.00		
Registered voters/turnout		512,490	61.93		

==== Sarawak ====
Party or alliance		Votes	%	Seats	+/–
Barisan Nasional	Sarawak United Peoples' Party	102,057	24.14	6	–1
Barisan Nasional	Parti Pesaka Bumiputera Bersatu	80,408	19.02	11	0
Barisan Nasional	Sarawak Progressive Democratic Party	49,483	11.71	4	New
Barisan Nasional	Parti Bansa Dayak Sarawak	46,292	10.95	6	0
Barisan Nasional	Total	278,240	65.83	27	–1
Democratic Action Party		67,556	15.98	1	+1
Sarawak National Party		28,481	6.74	0	–4
Barisan Alternatif	People's Justice Party	5,420	1.28	0	0
Barisan Alternatif	Pan-Malaysian Islamic Party	1,035	0.24	0	0
Barisan Alternatif	Total	6,455	1.53	0	New
State Reform Party		6,270	1.48	0	0
Independents		35,682	8.44	0	0
Total		422,684	100.00	28	0
Valid votes		422,684	98.54		
Invalid/blank votes		6,276	1.46		
Total votes		428,960	100.00		
Registered voters/turnout		695,969	61.63		

==== Selangor ====
Party or alliance		Votes	%	Seats	+/–
Barisan Nasional	United Malays National Organisation	280,225	27.73	10	+2
Barisan Nasional	Malaysian Chinese Association	232,958	23.05	7	+1
Barisan Nasional	Malaysian Indian Congress	129,131	12.78	4	+1
Barisan Nasional	Parti Gerakan Rakyat Malaysia	21,291	2.11	1	+1
Barisan Nasional	Total	663,605	65.67	22	+5
Barisan Alternatif	Pan-Malaysian Islamic Party	143,946	14.24	0	0
Barisan Alternatif	People's Justice Party	130,752	12.94	0	0
Barisan Alternatif	Total	274,698	27.18	0	0
Democratic Action Party		68,636	6.79	0	0
Independents		3,608	0.36	0	0
Total		1,010,547	100.00	22	+5
Valid votes		1,010,547	97.86		
Invalid/blank votes		22,136	2.14		
Total votes		1,032,683	100.00		
Registered voters/turnout		1,422,274	72.61		

==== Terengganu ====
Party or alliance		Votes	%	Seats	+/–
Barisan Nasional	United Malays National Organisation	219,861	56.40	8	+8
Barisan Alternatif	Pan-Malaysian Islamic Party	149,299	38.30	0	–7
Barisan Alternatif	People's Justice Party	20,635	5.29	0	–1
Barisan Alternatif	Total	169,934	43.60	0	–8
Total		389,795	100.00	8	0
Valid votes		389,795	98.39		
Invalid/blank votes		6,366	1.61		
Total votes		396,161	100.00		
Registered voters/turnout		455,924	86.89		

== See also ==
- Members of the Dewan Rakyat, 11th Malaysian Parliament
- 2004 Malaysian state elections
