= Ayer Keroh (state constituency) =

State constituency in Malacca, Malaysia

Ayer Keroh (N16)
Malacca constituency

State constituency
- Legislature: Malacca State Legislative Assembly
MLA
Kerk Chee Yee
PH
- Constituency created: 1974
- Constituency abolished: 1986
- Constituency re-created: 1994
- First contested: 1974
- Last contested: 2026

Demographics
- Electors (2026): 38,252

N16 Ayer Keroh within Malacca, as used for the 2021 state election

Ayer Keroh is a state constituency in Malacca, Malaysia, that has been represented in the Malacca State Legislative Assembly from 1974 to 1986, from 1995 to present. It has been represented by Deputy Speaker Kerk Chee Yee since 2018.

The state constituency was created in the 1974 redistribution and is mandated to return a single member to the Malacca State Legislative Assembly under the first past the post voting system.

== Demographics ==
Ethnic breakdown of Ayer Keroh's electorate as of 2026
1. Chinese (46.0%)
2. Malays (44.1%)
3. Indians (8.20%)
4. Other Ethnicities (1.60%)

== History ==
It was abolished in 1986 when it was redistributed. It was re-created in 1994.

The Ayer Keroh constituency contains the polling districts of Taman Melaka Baru, Sungai Putat, Taman Bukit Melaka, Ayer Keroh Heights, Kampung Ayer Keroh, Kampung Tun Razak, Batu Berendam, Taman Merdeka, Taman Bunga Raya, Taman Kerjasama and Taman Muzaffar Shah.

=== Polling districts ===
According to the federal gazette issued on 5 November 2026, the Ayer Keroh constituency is divided into 8 polling districts.

| State constituency | Polling District | Code | Location |
|---|---|---|---|
| Ayer Keroh（N16） | Sungai Putat | 137/16/01 | SMK Tun Mutahir; SMK Munshi Abdullah |
| Ayer Keroh（N16） | Kampung Ayer Keroh | 137/16/02 | SK Tun Syed Ahmad Shahabudin |
| Ayer Keroh（N16） | Ayer Keroh Heights | 137/16/03 | SRA (JAIM) Ayer Keroh |
| Ayer Keroh（N16） | Taman Kerjasama | 137/16/04 | Pusat Rujukan Sosial (KRT) Taman Kerjasama; Padang Pusat Sebaran Maklumat Nasional (NADI) Taman Bukit Beruang Utama |
| Ayer Keroh（N16） | Taman Bukit Melaka | 137/16/05 | Dewan MPHTJ Bukit Beruang |
| Ayer Keroh（N16） | Taman Bunga Raya | 137/16/06 | SJK (C) Bukit Beruang |
| Ayer Keroh（N16） | Taman Muzaffar Shah | 137/16/07 | SK Ayer Keroh |
| Ayer Keroh（N16） | Kampung Tun Razak | 137/16/08 | SR Arab (JAIM) Kampung Tun Razak; SR Arab (JAIM) Tun Razak |

=== Representation history ===
Members of the Legislative Assembly for Ayer Keroh
| Assembly | No | Years | Member | Party |
Constituency created from Batu Berendam, Semabok, Jasin and Kandang
| 4th | N13 | 1974-1978 | Hashim Pit | BN (UMNO) |
| 5th | N13 | 1978-1982 | Samad Kassim | BN (UMNO) |
| 6th | N13 | 1982-1986 | Samad Kassim | BN (UMNO) |
Constituency abolished, split into Ayer Molek, Tebong and Krubong
Constituency re-created from Ayer Molek and Krubong
| 9th | N13 | 1995-1999 | Seah Kwi Tong (佘贵忠) | BN (MCA) |
| 10th | N13 | 1999-2004 | Seah Kwi Tong (佘贵忠) | BN (MCA) |
| 11th | N16 | 2004-2008 | Seah Kwi Tong (佘贵忠) | BN (MCA) |
| 12th | N16 | 2008-2013 | Khoo Poay Tiong (邱培栋) | PR (DAP) |
| 13th | N16 | 2013-2018 | Khoo Poay Tiong (邱培栋) | PR (DAP) |
| 14th | N16 | 2018-2021 | Kerk Chee Yee (郭子毅) | PH (DAP) |
| 15th | N16 | 2021–2026 | Kerk Chee Yee (郭子毅) | PH (DAP) |
| 16th | N16 | 2026 – present | Kerk Chee Yee (郭子毅) | PH (DAP) |

== Election results ==
Malacca state election, 2026
| Party | Candidate | Votes | % | ∆% |
|---|---|---|---|---|
| PH | Kerk Chee Yee | 14,078 | 55.08 | ▼4.89 |
| PN | Michael Gan Peng Lam | 8,474 | 33.15 | ▲17.44 |
| BERSAMA | Muhammad Muhaimin Lau Abdullah @ Alan Lau Chee Keong | 1,932 | 7.56 | ▲7.56 |
| BERSATU | Mohd Hamnaim Mohamad | 1,077 | 4.21 | ▲4.21 |
| Total valid votes | | 25,561 | | |
| Total rejected ballots | | 218 | | |
| Unreturned ballots | | 44 | | |
| Turnout | | 25,823 | 67.51 | ▲5.65 |
| Registered electors | | 38,252 | | |
| Majority | | 5,604 | 21.93 | ▼13.73 |
| PH hold | | Swing | | |
Source(s) https://electiondata.my/elections/mlk/SE-16/

Malacca state election, 2021
| Party | Candidate | Votes | % | ∆% |
|---|---|---|---|---|
| PH | Kerk Chee Yee | 9,459 | 59.97 | ▲59.97 |
| BN | Yong Fun Juan | 3,835 | 24.31 | ▲1.36 |
| PN | Michael Gan Peng Lam | 2,479 | 15.71 | ▲15.71 |
| Total valid votes | | 15,773 | | |
| Total rejected ballots | | 201 | | |
| Unreturned ballots | | 75 | | |
| Turnout | | 16,049 | 61.86 | ▼25.17 |
| Registered electors | | 25,945 | | |
| Majority | | 5,624 | 35.66 | ▼6.70 |
| PH hold | | Swing | | |
Source(s) https://lom.agc.gov.my/ilims/upload/portal/akta/outputp/1715764/PUB%20583.pdf

Malacca state election, 2018
| Party | Candidate | Votes | % | ∆% |
|---|---|---|---|---|
| PKR | Kerk Chee Yee | 14,279 | 65.31 | ▲65.31 |
| BN | Chua Kheng Hwa | 5,018 | 22.95 | ▼13.78 |
| PAS | Sepri Rahman | 2,567 | 11.74 | ▲11.74 |
| Total valid votes | | 21,864 | 100.00 | |
| Total rejected ballots | | 178 | | |
| Unreturned ballots | | 70 | | |
| Turnout | | 22,112 | 87.03 | ▼1.80 |
| Registered electors | | 25,407 | | |
| Majority | | 9,261 | 42.36 | ▲15.82 |
| PKR hold | | Swing | | |

Malacca state election, 2013
| Party | Candidate | Votes | % | ∆% |
|---|---|---|---|---|
| DAP | Khoo Poay Tiong | 18,934 | 63.27 | ▲5.02 |
| BN | Yong Fun Juan | 10,991 | 36.73 | ▼5.02 |
| Total valid votes | | 29,925 | 100.00 | |
| Total rejected ballots | | 401 | | |
| Unreturned ballots | | 76 | | |
| Turnout | | 30,402 | 88.83 | ▲7.40 |
| Registered electors | | 34,225 | | |
| Majority | | 7,943 | 26.54 | ▲10.04 |
| DAP hold | | Swing | | |
Source(s) "Federal Government Gazette - Notice of Contested Election, State Legislative Assembly for the State of Malacca [P.U. (B) 194/2013]" (PDF). Attorney General's Chambers of Malaysia. 26 April 2013. "Federal Government Gazette - Results of Contested Election and Statements of the Poll after the Official Addition of Votes, State Constituencies for the State of Malacca [P.U. (B) 235/2013]" (PDF). Attorney General's Chambers of Malaysia. 22 May 2013.

Malacca state election, 2008
| Party | Candidate | Votes | % | ∆% |
|---|---|---|---|---|
| DAP | Khoo Poay Tiong | 11,309 | 58.25 | ▲17.52 |
| BN | Chiew Hong Lan | 8,104 | 41.75 | ▼17.52 |
| Total valid votes | | 19,413 | 100.00 | |
| Total rejected ballots | | 477 | | |
| Unreturned ballots | | 63 | | |
| Turnout | | 19,953 | 81.43 | ▲1.31 |
| Registered electors | | 24,504 | | |
| Majority | | 3,205 | 16.50 | ▼2.04 |
| DAP gain from BN | | Swing | | ? |

Malacca state election, 2004
| Party | Candidate | Votes | % | ∆% |
|---|---|---|---|---|
| BN | Seah Kwi Tong | 9,549 | 59.27 | ▲3.00 |
| DAP | Sim Tong Him | 6,562 | 40.73 | ▼3.00 |
| Total valid votes | | 16,111 | 100.00 | |
| Total rejected ballots | | 476 | | |
| Unreturned ballots | | 62 | | |
| Turnout | | 16,649 | 80.12 | ▲0.14 |
| Registered electors | | 20,779 | | |
| Majority | | 2,987 | 18.54 | ▲6.00 |
| BN hold | | Swing | | |

Malacca state election, 1999
| Party | Candidate | Votes | % | ∆% |
|---|---|---|---|---|
| BN | Seah Kwi Tong | 7,656 | 56.27 | ▼5.55 |
| DAP | Joseph Sta Maria | 5,949 | 43.73 | ▲14.62 |
| Total valid votes | | 13,605 | 100.00 | |
| Total rejected ballots | | 370 | | |
| Unreturned ballots | | 44 | | |
| Turnout | | 14,019 | 79.98 | ▼2.59 |
| Registered electors | | 17,528 | | |
| Majority | | 1,707 | 12.54 | ▼20.17 |
| BN hold | | Swing | | |

Malacca state election, 1995
| Party | Candidate | Votes | % | ∆% |
|---|---|---|---|---|
| BN | Seah Kwi Tong | 7,349 | 61.82 | ▼12.84 |
| DAP | Tan Tong Chiew | 3,461 | 29.11 | ▲3.77 |
| PAS | Hassan Mohamed | 1,078 | 9.07 | ▲9.07 |
| Total valid votes | | 11,888 | 100.00 | |
| Total rejected ballots | | 237 | | |
| Unreturned ballots | | 68 | | |
| Turnout | | 12,193 | 82.57 | ▲4.54 |
| Registered electors | | 14,766 | | |
| Majority | | 3,888 | 32.71 | ▼16.61 |
| BN hold | | Swing | | |

Malacca state election, 1982
| Party | Candidate | Votes | % |
|---|---|---|---|
| BN | Samad Kassim | 7,291 | 74.66 |
| DAP | Robert Ang | 2,474 | 25.34 |
| Total valid votes | | 9,765 | 100.00 |
| Total rejected ballots | | 199 | |
| Unreturned ballots | | 0 | |
| Turnout | | 9,964 | 78.03 |
| Registered electors | | 12,769 | |
| Majority | | 4,817 | 49.32 |
| BN hold | | Swing | |

Malacca state election, 1978
| Party | Candidate | Votes | % | ∆% |
|---|---|---|---|---|
On the nomination day, Samad Kassim won uncontested.
| BN | Samad Kassim | | | |
| Total valid votes | | | 100.00 | |
| Total rejected ballots | | | | |
| Unreturned ballots | | | | |
| Turnout | | | | |
| Registered electors | | | | |
| Majority | | | | |
| BN hold | | Swing | | |

Melaka election, 1974: Ayer Keroh
| Party | Candidate | Votes | % |
|---|---|---|---|
| BN | Hashim Pit | 3,441 | 59.00 |
| Parti Rakyat Malaysia | Hasnul Abdul Hadi | 1,656 | 28.40 |
| Independent | Clement Eusta Britto | 553 | 9.48 |
| PEKEMAS | Mohamed Said Yaman | 182 | 3.12 |
| Total valid votes | | 5,832 | 100.00 |
| Total rejected votes | | 295 | |
| Unreturned ballots | | 0 | |
| Turnout | | 6,127 | 81.60 |
| Registered electors | | 7,509 | |
| Majority | | 1,785 | 30.61 |
This was a new constituency created.
