= Air Putih (Penang state constituency) =

State constituency in Penang, Malaysia

Air Putih (N23)
Penang constituency
- Air Putih (olive) on Penang

State constituency
- Legislature: Penang State Legislative Assembly
MLA
Lim Guan Eng
PH
- Constituency created: 2004
- First contested: 2004
- Last contested: 2023

Demographics
- Population (2020): 14,744
- Electors (2023): 15,371
- Area (km²): 29

Air Putih is a state constituency in Penang, Malaysia, that has been represented in the Penang State Legislative Assembly since 2004. It covers the northern part of Air Itam, a suburb of George Town that is located in the central part of Penang Island.

The state constituency was first contested in 2004 and is mandated to return a single Assemblyman to the Penang State Legislative Assembly under the first-past-the-post voting system. Since 2008, the State Assemblyman for Air Putih is Lim Guan Eng from the Democratic Action Party (DAP), which is part of the state's ruling coalition, Pakatan Harapan (PH). Lim was also the Chief Minister of Penang between 2008 and 2018.

== Definition ==
The Air Putih constituency contains the polling districts of Bukit Bendera (Penang Hill), Hye Keat Estate, Jalan Lintang, Race Course, Reservoir Gardens, Stesen Bawah (referring to the Penang Hill Railway Lower Station) and Taman Sempadan.

=== Polling districts ===
According to the federal gazette issued on 18 July 2023, the Air Putih constituency is divided into 7 polling districts.

State constituency	Polling districts	Code	Location
Air Putih (N23)	Bukit Bendera	048/23/01	Dewan Jawatankuasa Kemajuan Dan Keselamatan Kampong (JKKK) Bukit Bendera
Air Putih (N23)	Stesyen Bawah	048/23/02	Dewan Jawatankuasa Kemajuan Dan Keselamatan Kampong (JKKK) Bukit Bendera
Air Putih (N23)	Jalan Lintang	048/23/03	SJK (C) Kong Min Pusat
Air Putih (N23)	Hye Keat Estate	048/23/04	SJK (C) Kong Min Pusat
Air Putih (N23)	Reservoir Gardens	048/23/05	SJK (C) Chung Hwa Confucian 'A'
Air Putih (N23)	Race Course	048/23/06	SJK (C) Shang Wu
Air Putih (N23)	Taman Sempadan	048/23/07	SJK (C) Chung Hwa Confucian 'B'

Aside from the northern part of the Air Itam suburb, colloquially known as Air Putih by the locals, much of the state seat is sparsely populated, consisting of hilly and forested areas that include the Penang Hill.

The Air Putih seat is bounded to the southeast by Air Itam Road; the portion of Air Itam south of the road falls under the Air Itam constituency. This constituency also stretches up to the residential areas of Air Itam south of the Rifle Range neighbourhood, with Rifle Range coming under the neighbouring Kebun Bunga seat.

== Demographics ==
Ethnic breakdown of Air Putih's electorate as of 2023
1. Chinese (80.0%)
2. Malay (9.88%)
3. Indian (9.36%)
4. Other ethnicities (0.73%)

Total electors by polling district in 2016
Polling district	Electors
Bukit Bendera	309
Hye Keat Estate	2,814
Jalan Lintang	2,129
Race Course	2,429
Reservoir Gardens	2,690
Stesen Bawah	271
Taman Sempadan	2,110
Total	12,752
Source: Malaysian Election Commission

== History ==
Penang State Legislative Assemblyman for Air Putih
Assembly	No	Years	Member	Party
Constituency created from Air Itam
11th	N23	2004 – 2008	Lye Siew Weng (黎兆榮)	BN (MCA)
12th	N23	2008 – 2013	Lim Guan Eng (林冠英)	PR (DAP)
13th	N23	2013 – 2018	Lim Guan Eng (林冠英)	PR (DAP)
14th	N23	2018 – 2023	Lim Guan Eng (林冠英)	PH (DAP)
15th	N23	2023–present	Lim Guan Eng (林冠英)	PH (DAP)

== Election results ==
The electoral results for the Air Putih state constituency are as follows.

Penang state election, 2023
Party	Candidate	Votes	%	∆%
PH	Lim Guan Eng	8,996	85.63	▲0.02
PN	Ivan Kong Cheng Ann	1,073	10.21	▲10.21
Parti Rakyat Malaysia	Teh Yee Cheu	437	4.16	▲4.16
Total valid votes		10,506	100.00	
Total rejected ballots		61		
Unreturned ballots		16		
Turnout		10,583	68.85	▼13.11
Registered electors		15,371		
Majority		7,923	75.42	▲2.65
PH hold		Swing		

Penang state election, 2018
Party	Candidate	Votes	%	∆%
PKR	Lim Guan Eng	9,362	85.61	▲1.96
BN	Tang Heap Seng	1,404	12.84	▼3.31
BERSAMA	Tan Gim Theam	87	0.80	▲0.80
Love Malaysia Party	Manikandan Ramayah	83	0.76	▲0.76
Total valid votes		10,936	100.00	
Total rejected ballots		88		
Unreturned ballots		48		
Turnout		11,072	81.96	▼2.58
Registered electors		13,509		
Majority		7,958	72.77	▲5.27
PKR hold		Swing		{{{2}}}
Source(s) "His Majesty's Government Gazette - Notice of Contested Election, State Legislative Assembly for the State of Penang [P.U. (B) 252/2018]" (PDF). Attorney General's Chambers of Malaysia. 3 May 2018. "Federal Government Gazette - Results of Contested Election and Statements of the Poll after the Official Addition of Votes, State Constituencies for the State of Penang [P.U. (B) 326/2018]" (PDF). Attorney General's Chambers of Malaysia. 28 May 2018. Archived from the original (PDF) on 29 August 2019.

Penang state election, 2013
Party	Candidate	Votes	%	∆%
DAP	Lim Guan Eng	9,626	83.65	▲11.44
BN	Tan Ken Keong	1,882	16.15	▼11.44
Total valid votes		11,508	100.00	
Total rejected ballots		161		
Unreturned ballots		28		
Turnout		11,669	84.54	▲9.96
Registered electors		13,803		
Majority		7,744	67.50	▲23.08
DAP hold		Swing		{{{2}}}
Source(s) "Federal Government Gazette - Notice of Contested Election, State Legislative Assembly for the State of Penang [P.U. (B) 189/2013]" (PDF). Attorney General's Chambers of Malaysia. 26 April 2013. "Federal Government Gazette - Results of Contested Election and Statements of the Poll after the Official Addition of Votes, State Constituencies for the State of Penang [P.U. (B) 230/2013]" (PDF). Attorney General's Chambers of Malaysia. 22 May 2013. Archived from the original (PDF) on 22 March 2019.

Penang state election, 2008
Party	Candidate	Votes	%	∆%
DAP	Lim Guan Eng	6,601	72.21	▲28.13
BN	Tan Yok Cheng	2,540	27.79	▼28.13
Total valid votes		9,141	100.00	
Total rejected ballots		130		
Unreturned ballots		17		
Turnout		9,288	74.58	▲3.45
Registered electors		12,454		
Majority		4,061	44.42	▲32.58
DAP gain from BN		Swing		?

Penang state election, 2004
Party	Candidate	Votes	%
BN	Lye Siew Weng	4,811	55.92
DAP	Tee Yee Cheu	3,793	44.08
Total valid votes		8,604	100.00
Total rejected ballots		161	
Unreturned ballots		14	
Turnout		8,779	71.13
Registered electors		12,342	
Majority		818	11.84
This was a new constituency created.

== See also ==
- Constituencies of Penang
