= Deputy Minister of Finance (Malaysia) =

Malaysian government deputy minister

- Timbalan Menteri Kewangan
- Coat of Arms of Government of Malaysia
- Incumbent; Lim Hui Ying since 12 December 2023
- Ministry of Finance
- Style: Yang Berhormat
- Member of: Cabinet of Malaysia
- Reports to: Prime Minister; Minister of Finance
- Seat: Putrajaya
- Appointer: Yang di-Pertuan Agong; on advice of the Prime Minister
- Term length: No fixed term
- Inaugural holder: Ali Ahmad (as Assistant Minister of Finance)

The Deputy Minister of Finance (Malay: Timbalan Menteri Kewangan; Chinese: 财政部副部长; Tamil: நிதித்துறை துணை அமைச்சர் ) is a Malaysian cabinet position serving as deputy head of the Ministry of Finance.

== List of Deputy Ministers of Finance ==
The following individuals have been appointed as Deputy Minister of Finance, or any of its precedent titles:

Colour key (for political coalition/parties):

Coalition	Component party	Timeline
Alliance Party	United Malays National Organisation (UMNO)	1957–1973
Barisan Nasional (BN)	United Malays National Organisation (UMNO)	1973–present
Barisan Nasional (BN)	Malaysian Chinese Association (MCA)	1973–present
Pakatan Harapan (PH)	Democratic Action Party (DAP)	2015–present
Pakatan Harapan (PH)	Malaysian United Indigenous Party (BERSATU)	2015–2020
Perikatan Nasional (PN)	Malaysian United Indigenous Party (BERSATU)	2020–present
Gabungan Rakyat Sabah (GRS)	Malaysian United Indigenous Party (BERSATU)	2020–present

=== Assistant Minister of Finance ===
Portrait	Name (Birth–Death) Constituency	Political coalition	Political party	Took office	Left office	Prime Minister (Cabinet)
	Ali Ahmad (1930–1977); MP for Pontian Selatan	BN	UMNO			Tunku Abdul Rahman (IIII); Abdul Razak Hussein (I)
Deputy Minister of Finance was created serving alongside Assistant Minister, subsequently the Assistant Minister was integrated with Deputy Minister of Finance
=== Deputy Minister of Finance ===
Portrait	Name (Birth–Death) Constituency	Political coalition	Political party	Took office	Left office	Prime Minister (Cabinet)
	Mohamed Rahmat (1938–2010); MP for Johore Bahru Barat	BN	UMNO			Abdul Razak Hussein (I)
	Chong Hon Nyan (1924–2020); MP for Batu Berendam	BN	MCA	1974	1976	Abdul Razak Hussein (II)
	Richard Ho Ung Hun (1927–2008); MP for Lumut	BN	MCA	1976	31 December 1976	Hussein Onn (I)
	Neo Yee Pan (1938–2020); MP for Muar	BN	MCA	1 January 1977	15 September 1979	Hussein Onn (I · II)
	Rafidah Aziz (b.1943); Senator; MP for Selayang	BN	UMNO			Hussein Onn (I · II)
	Mak Hon Kam (?–?); MP for Tanjong Malim	BN	MCA			Hussein Onn (II)
	Shahrir Abdul Samad (b.1949); MP for Johor Bahru	BN	UMNO			Hussein Onn (II)
	Mak Hon Kam (?–?); MP for Tanjong Malim	BN	MCA	16 July 1981	30 April 1982	Mahathir Mohamad (I)
	Najib Razak (b.1953); MP for Pekan	BN	UMNO	17 July 1981	30 April 1982	Mahathir Mohamad (I)
	Sabbaruddin Chik (1941–2021); MP for Temerloh	BN	UMNO	30 April 1982	10 August 1986	Mahathir Mohamad (II)
	Ling Liong Sik (b.1943); MP for Mata Kuching	BN	MCA	30 April 1982	16 July 1984	Mahathir Mohamad (II)
	Tan Tiong Hong (?–?); MP for Raub	BN	MCA	16 July 1984	7 January 1986	Mahathir Mohamad (II)
	Oo Gin Sun (b.?–?); MP for Alor Setar	BN	MCA	7 January 1986	10 August 1986	Mahathir Mohamad (II)
	Sabbaruddin Chik (1941–2021); MP for Temerloh	BN	UMNO	11 August 1986	20 May 1987	Mahathir Mohamad (III)
	Ng Cheng Kiat (?–?); MP for Klang	BN	MCA	11 August 1986	14 August 1989	Mahathir Mohamad (III)
	Wan Abu Bakar Wan Mohamad (?–?); MP for Jerantut	BN	UMNO	20 May 1987	26 October 1990	Mahathir Mohamad (III)
	Loke Yuen Yow (b.1952); MP for Tanjong Malim	BN	MCA	14 August 1989	26 October 1990	Mahathir Mohamad (III)
	Abdul Ghani Othman (b.1946); MP for Ledang	BN	UMNO	27 October 1990	1 December 1993	Mahathir Mohamad (IIII)
	Loke Yuen Yow (b.1952); MP for Tanjong Malim	BN	MCA	27 October 1990	3 May 1995	Mahathir Mohamad (IIII)
	Mustapa Mohamed (b.1950); Senator	BN	UMNO	1 December 1993	3 May 1995	Mahathir Mohamad (IIII)
	Affifudin Omar (1943–2018); MP for Padang Terap	BN	UMNO	8 May 1995	12 November 1996	Mahathir Mohamad (V)
	Wong See Wah (b.?); MP for Rasah	BN	MCA	8 May 1995	14 December 1999	Mahathir Mohamad (V)
	Mohamed Nazri Abdul Aziz (b.1954); MP for Chenderoh	BN	UMNO	12 November 1996	14 December 1999	Mahathir Mohamad (V)
	Shafie Salleh (1946–2019); MP for Kuala Langat	BN	UMNO	15 December 1999	2 November 2003	Mahathir Mohamad (VI)
	Chan Kong Choy (b.1955); MP for Selayang	BN	MCA	15 December 1999	1 July 2003	Mahathir Mohamad (VI)
	Ng Yen Yen (b.1946); MP for Raub	BN	MCA	1 July 2003	2 November 2003	Mahathir Mohamad (VI)
	Shafie Salleh (1946–2019); MP for Kuala Langat	BN	UMNO	3 November 2003	26 March 2004	Abdullah Ahmad Badawi (I)
	Ng Yen Yen (b.1946); MP for Raub	BN	MCA	3 November 2003	26 March 2004	Abdullah Ahmad Badawi (I)
	Tengku Putera Tengku Awang (b.1959); MP for Hulu Terengganu	BN	UMNO	27 March 2004	14 February 2006	Abdullah Ahmad Badawi (II)
	Ng Yen Yen (b.1946); MP for Raub	BN	MCA	27 March 2004	18 March 2008	Abdullah Ahmad Badawi (II)
	Awang Adek Hussin (b.1956); MP for Bachok	BN	UMNO	14 February 2006	18 March 2008	Abdullah Ahmad Badawi (II)
	Ahmad Husni Hanadzlah (b.1952); MP for Tambun	BN	UMNO	19 March 2008	9 April 2009	Abdullah Ahmad Badawi (III)
	Kong Cho Ha (b.1950); MP for Lumut	BN	MCA	19 March 2008	9 April 2009	Abdullah Ahmad Badawi (III)
	Awang Adek Hussin (b.1956); Senator	BN	UMNO	10 April 2009	15 May 2013	Najib Razak (I)
	Chor Chee Heung (b.1955); MP for Alor Setar	BN	MCA	10 April 2009	4 June 2010	Najib Razak (I)
	Donald Lim Siang Chai (b.?); Senator	BN	MCA	4 June 2010	15 May 2013	Najib Razak (I)
	Ahmad Maslan (b.1966); MP for Pontian	BN	UMNO	16 May 2013	29 July 2015	Najib Razak (II)
	Chua Tee Yong (b.1977); MP for Labis	BN	MCA	27 June 2014	27 June 2016	Najib Razak (II)
	Johari Abdul Ghani (b.1977); MP for Titiwangsa	BN	UMNO	29 July 2015	27 June 2016	Najib Razak (II)
	Othman Aziz (b.1959); MP for Jerlun	BN	UMNO	27 June 2016	9 May 2018	Najib Razak (II)
	Lee Chee Leong (b.1957); Senator	BN	MCA	27 June 2016	9 May 2018	Najib Razak (II)
	Amiruddin Hamzah (b.1962); MP for Kubang Pasu	PH	BERSATU	2 July 2018	24 February 2020	Mahathir Mohamad (VII)
	Abdul Rahim Bakri (b.1961); MP for Kudat	PN	BERSATU	10 March 2020	16 August 2021	Muhyiddin Yassin (I)
	Mohd Shahar Abdullah (b.1980); MP for Paya Besar	BN	UMNO	10 March 2020	16 August 2021	Muhyiddin Yassin (I)
	Mohd Shahar Abdullah (b.1980); MP for Paya Besar	BN	UMNO	30 August 2021	24 November 2022	Ismail Sabri Yaakob (I)
	Yamani Hafez Musa (b.1978); MP for Sipitang	GRS	BERSATU Sabah	30 August 2021	24 November 2022	Ismail Sabri Yaakob (I)
	Ahmad Maslan (b.1966); MP for Pontian	BN	UMNO	10 December 2022	12 December 2023	Anwar Ibrahim (I)
	Steven Sim Chee Keong (b.1982); MP for Bukit Mertajam	PH	DAP	10 December 2022	12 December 2023	Anwar Ibrahim (I)
	Lim Hui Ying (b.1963); MP for Tanjong	PH	DAP	12 December 2023	Incumbent	Anwar Ibrahim (I)

== See also ==
- Minister of Finance (Malaysia)
