= Minister of Finance (Malaysia) =

Cabinet position in Malaysia

- Menteri Kewangan

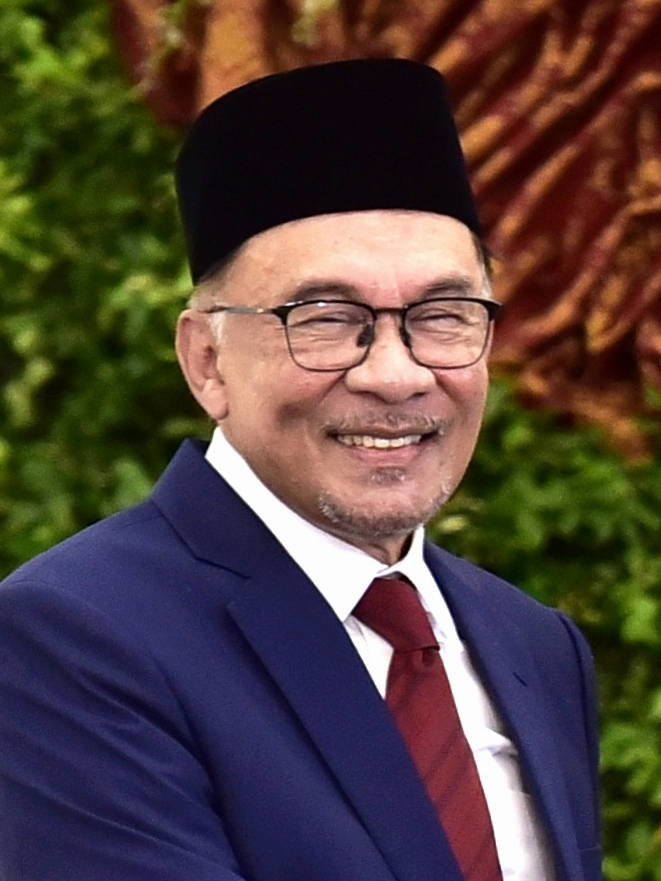
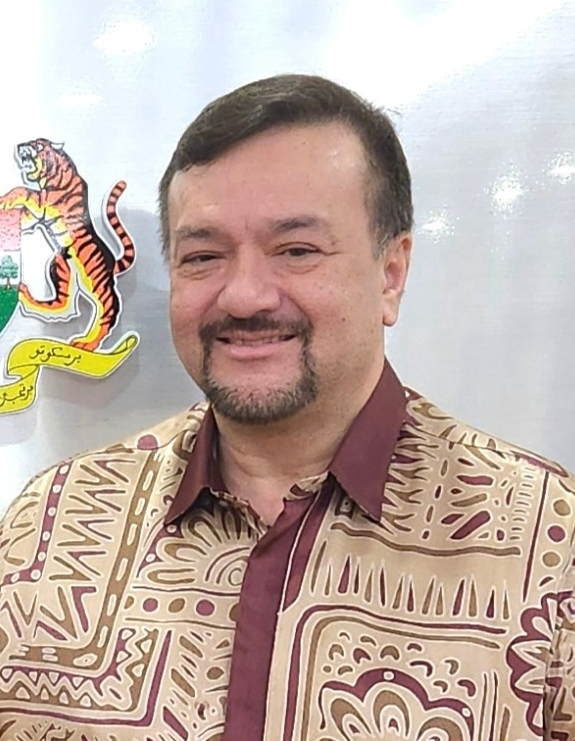
- Incumbent; Anwar Ibrahim (Minister of Finance I); Amir Hamzah Azizan (Minister of Finance II) since 3 December 2022 (Anwar Ibrahim) since 12 December 2023 (Amir Hamzah Azizan)
- Ministry of Finance
- Style: Yang Berhormat (The Honourable)
- Abbreviation: MOF
- Member of: Cabinet of Malaysia
- Reports to: Parliament of Malaysia
- Seat: Putrajaya
- Appointer: Yang di-Pertuan Agong on the recommendation of the Prime Minister of Malaysia
- Term length: At the Prime Minister pleasure
- Formation: 1957
- First holder: Henry Lee Hau Shik
- Deputy: Liew Chin Tong
- Website: www.mof.gov.my

The Minister of Finance (or simply, Finance Minister) (Malay: Menteri Kewangan; Jawi: منتري کواڠن) is the head of the Ministry of Finance of the Government of Malaysia. One of the senior posts in the Cabinet of Malaysia, the Finance Minister is responsible for determining the fiscal policy and managing the national budget of the government.

The Minister of Finance have been Prime Minister Anwar Ibrahim since 3 December 2022 and Amir Hamzah Azizan since 12 December 2023. Anwar Ibrahim has served as the Minister of Finance before from 1991 to 1998. Both of them support by the Deputy Minister of Finance Liew Chin Tong, since 17 December 2025.

== List of the ministers of finance ==
The following individuals have been appointed Minister of Finance, or any of its precedent titles:

Political party: Alliance/BN PH Independent

Portrait	Name (Birth–Death) Constituency	Political party	Title	Took office	Left office	Deputy Minister	Prime Minister (Cabinet)
	Henry Lee Hau Shik (1900–1988); Nominated	Alliance (MCA)	Minister of Finance	31 August 1957	22 August 1959	Vacant	Tunku Abdul Rahman (I)
	Tan Siew Sin (1916–1988); MP for Malacca Tengah	Alliance (MCA)	Minister of Finance	22 August 1959	8 April 1974	Vacant (1959–1973); Mohamed Rahmat (1973–1974)	Tunku Abdul Rahman (II • III • IV); Abdul Razak Hussein (I)
	Hussein Onn (1922–1990) (Deputy Prime Minister); MP for Sri Gading	BN (UMNO)	Minister of Finance	1974	1976	Chong Hon Nyan	Abdul Razak Hussein (II)
	Tengku Razaleigh Hamzah (b. 1937); MP for Ulu Kelantan	BN (UMNO)	Minister of Finance	1976	16 July 1984	Richard Ho (1976); Neo Yee Pan (1976–1979); Rafidah Aziz (1977–1980); Mak Hon Kam (1979–1982); Najib Razak (1981–1982); Sabbaruddin Chik (1982–1984); Ling Liong Sik (1982–1984)	Hussein Onn (I • II); Mahathir Mohamad (I • II)
	Daim Zainuddin (1938–2024); MP for Kuala Muda (1984-1986); MP for Merbok (1986-1991)	BN (UMNO)	Minister of Finance	14 July 1984	15 March 1991	Sabbaruddin Chik (1984–1987); Tan Tiong Hong (1984–1986); Oo Gin Sun (1986); Ng Cheng Kiat (1986); Loke Yuen Yeow (1986–1990); Mohamed Farid Ariffin (1987–1989); Wan Abu Bakar Wan Mohamad (1989–1990)	Mahathir Mohamad (II • III • IV)
	Anwar Ibrahim (b. 1947) (Deputy Prime Minister); MP for Permatang Pauh	BN (UMNO)	Minister of Finance	15 March 1991	2 September 1998	Abdul Ghani Othman (1990–1993); Loke Yuen Yow (1990–1995); Mustapa Mohamed (1993–1995); Abdullah Fadzil Che Wan (1995–1998)	Mahathir Mohamad (IV • V)
	Mahathir Mohamad (b. 1925) (Prime Minister); MP for Kubang Pasu	BN (UMNO)	Minister of Finance	2 September 1998	7 January 1999	Abdullah Fadzil Che Wan	Mahathir Mohamad (V)
	Mustapa Mohamed (b. 1950); MP for Jeli	BN (UMNO)	Second Minister of Finance	2 September 1998	14 December 1999	Abdullah Fadzil Che Wan	Mahathir Mohamad (V)
	Daim Zainuddin (1938–2024); MP for Merbok	BN (UMNO)	Minister of Finance	7 January 1999	31 May 2001	Abdullah Fadzil Che Wan (1999); Shafie Salleh (1999–2001); Chan Kong Choy (1999–2001)	Mahathir Mohamad (V • VI)
	Mahathir Mohamad (b. 1925) (Prime Minister); MP for Kubang Pasu	BN (UMNO)	Minister of Finance	5 June 2001	2 November 2003	Shafie Salleh (2001–2003); Chan Kong Choy (2001–2003); Ng Yen Yen (2003)	Mahathir Mohamad (VI)
	Jamaluddin Jarjis (1951–2015); MP for Rompin	BN (UMNO)	Second Minister of Finance	20 November 2002	26 March 2004	Shafie Salleh (2002–2004); Chan Kong Choy (2002–2003); Ng Yen Yen (2003–2004)	Mahathir Mohamad (VI); Abdullah Ahmad Badawi (I)
	Abdullah Ahmad Badawi (1939–2025) (Prime Minister); MP for Kepala Batas	BN (UMNO)	Minister of Finance	3 November 2003	23 September 2008	Shafie Salleh (2003–2004); Ng Yen Yen (2003–2008); Tengku Putera Tengku Awang (2004–2006); Awang Adek Hussin (2006–2008); Ahmad Husni Hanadzlah (2008); Kong Cho Ha (2008)	Abdullah Ahmad Badawi (I • II • III)
	Nor Mohamed Yakcop (b. 1947); Senator (2004-2008); MP for Tasek Gelugor (2008-2009)	BN (UMNO)	Second Minister of Finance	27 March 2004	9 April 2009	Ng Yen Yen (2004–2008); Tengku Putera Tengku Awang (2004–2006); Awang Adek Hussin (2006–2008); Ahmad Husni Hanadzlah (2008–2009); Kong Cho Ha (2008–2009)	Abdullah Ahmad Badawi (II • III)
	Najib Razak (b. 1953) (Deputy Prime Minister) (Prime Minister); MP for Pekan	BN (UMNO)	Minister of Finance	23 September 2008	9 May 2018	Ahmad Husni Hanadzlah (2008–2009); Kong Cho Ha (2008–2009); Awang Adek Hussin (2009–2013); Chor Chee Heung (2009–2010); Donald Lim Siang Chai (2010–2013); Ahmad Maslan (2013–2015); Chua Tee Yong (2014–2016); Johari Abdul Ghani (2014–2016); Othman Aziz (2016–2018); Lee Chee Leong; 2016–2018)	Abdullah Ahmad Badawi (III); Najib Razak (I • II)
	Ahmad Husni Hanadzlah (b. 1952); MP for Tambun	BN (UMNO)	Second Minister of Finance	10 April 2009	27 June 2016	Awang Adek Hussin (2009–2013); Chor Chee Heung (2009–2010); Donald Lim Siang Chai (2010–2013); Ahmad Maslan (2013–2015); Chua Tee Yong (2014–2016); Johari Abdul Ghani (2014–2016)	Najib Razak (I • II)
	Johari Abdul Ghani (b. 1964); MP for Titiwangsa	BN (UMNO)	Second Minister of Finance	27 June 2016	9 May 2018	Othman Aziz (2016–2018); Lee Chee Leong; 2016–2018)	Najib Razak (II)
	Lim Guan Eng (b. 1960); MP for Bagan	PH (DAP)	Minister of Finance	21 May 2018	24 February 2020	Amiruddin Hamzah	Mahathir Mohamad (VII)
	Tengku Zafrul Aziz (b. 1973); Senator	BN (UMNO)	Minister of Finance	10 March 2020	24 November 2022	Mohd Shahar Abdullah (2020–2022); Abdul Rahim Bakri (2020–2021); Yamani Hafez Musa (2021–2022)	Muhyiddin Yassin (I); Ismail Sabri Yaakob (I)
	Anwar Ibrahim (b. 1947) (Prime Minister); MP for Tambun	PH (PKR)	Minister of Finance	3 December 2022	Incumbent	Ahmad Maslan (2022–2023); Steven Sim Chee Keong (2022–2023); Lim Hui Ying (2023–2025); Liew Chin Tong (2025–current)	Anwar Ibrahim (I)
	Amir Hamzah Azizan (b. 1967); Senator	Independent	Second Minister of Finance	12 December 2023	Incumbent	Lim Hui Ying (2023–2025); Liew Chin Tong (2025–current)	Anwar Ibrahim (I)
