= Hassan Marican =

Malaysian business and corporate figure

Yang Berbahagia Tan Sri Dato' Seri Mohd Hassan Marican PSM SSDK SUMW SPMT PNBS DSMT

Chairman of the Special Advisory Body to the Minister of Finance
- Incumbent
- Assumed office 7 February 2023
- Monarch: Abdullah
- Prime Minister: Anwar Ibrahim
- Minister: Anwar Ibrahim (Minister of Finance); Amir Hamzah Azizan (Minister of Finance II, since December 2023)

Member of the Council of Eminent Persons
- In office 12 May 2018 – 24 February 2020 Serving with Zeti Akhtar Aziz, Daim Zainuddin, Robert Kuok and Jomo Kwame Sundaram
- Monarchs: Muhammad V (2018–2019); Abdullah (2019–2020)
- Prime Minister: Mahathir Mohamad
- Chairman: Daim Zainuddin

Member of the Board of Directors of Khazanah Nasional
- In office 2018 – 6 March 2020 Serving with Azmin Ali, Sukdave Singh and Goh Ching Yin

President and Chief Executive Officer of Petronas
- In office February 1995 – 9 February 2010
- Preceded by: Azizan Zainul Abidin
- Succeeded by: Shamsul Azhar Abbas

Personal details
- Born: 18 October 1952 (age 74) Sungai Petani, Kedah, Federation of Malaya (now Malaysia)
- Citizenship: Malaysia
- Spouse: Noraini Mohamed Yusoff
- Children: 4
- Education: Malay College Kuala Kangsar

Mohd Hassan Marican (born 18 October 1952) is a Malaysian businessman and corporate figure who has served as Chairman of the Special Advisory Body to the Minister of Finance Anwar Ibrahim and Minister II Amir Hamzah Azizan since February 2023. He is the former President and Chief Executive of Petronas, Member of the Council of Eminent Persons and Member of the Board of Directors of Khazanah Nasional.

== Early life and education ==
Hassan was born in Sungai Petani, Kedah on 18 October 1952. He studied in Malay College Kuala Kangsar (MCKK) in 1971.

== Career ==
Hassan Marican was a partner of an accounting firm named Hanafiah Raslan & Mohamed from 1981 to 1989.

Hassan was the CEO of Petronas Nasional Berhad from 1995 till 10 February 2010. He was appointed by Mahathir Mohamad as a Member of the Council of Eminent Persons (CEP) along with Zeti Akhtar Aziz, Daim Zainuddin, Robert Kuok and Jomo Kwame Sundaram in 2018. He was appointed a Director of Khazanah Nasional Berhad on July the same year. Hassan is also the Senior Advisor of Temasik International Advisors, the Chairman of Sembcorp Marine, and the Director of the Regional Economic Development Authority of Sarawak.

=== Chairman of the Special Advisory Body to the Minister of Finance ===
On 7 February 2023, Prime Minister and Minister of Finance Anwar Ibrahim announced the formation of a special advisory body to him as the Minister of Finance and the body appointments of Hassan as Chairman as well as Executive Chairman of the FVSB Sdn Bhd Ahmad Fuad Md Ali, Professor of Economics of the Sunway University Yeah Kim Leng, Professor of Economics of the University of Malaya, Distinguished Professor Rajah Rasiah and Chairman of the Sarawak Energy Berhad Amar Abdul Hamed Sepawi as Members. Anwar also added that the group would not be paid by the government. On 8 February 2023, Anwar revealed that the task of the body was to propose actions to improve the financial and economic standing of Malaysia and Hassan would announce further details of the actions. On 12 February 2023, Senior Advisor to Prime Minister Anwar on Economics and Finance Nurul Izzah Anwar resigned from the position after accepting the invitation by Hassan to serve as co-chairperson of the secretariat of the body along with Petronas senior manager Khairil Anuar Ramli to support the work of body.

== Honours ==
=== Honours of Malaysia ===
- Malaysia
  - Commander of the Order of Loyalty to the Crown of Malaysia (PSM) – Tan Sri (1997)
- Kedah
  - Grand Commander of the Order of Loyalty to the Royal House of Kedah (SSDK) – Dato' Seri (2008)
- Federal Territory (Malaysia)
  - Grand Knight of the Order of the Territorial Crown (SUMW) – Datuk Seri Utama (2009)
- Terengganu
  - Companion of the Order of Sultan Mahmud I of Terengganu (DSMT) – Dato' (1992)
  - Grand Commander of the Order of the Crown of Terengganu (SPMT) – Dato' Seri (1996)
- Sarawak
  - Grand Commander of the Order of the Star of Sarawak (PNBS) – Dato Sri (2003)
