= Deputy Minister of Education (Malaysia) =

Malaysian government deputy minister

- Timbalan Menteri Pendidikan
- Coat of Arms of Government of Malaysia
- Incumbent; Wong Kah Woh since 12 December 2023
- Ministry of Education
- Style: Yang Berhormat Timbalan Menteri (The Honourable Deputy Minister)
- Reports to: Prime Minister; Minister of Education
- Appointer: Yang di-Pertuan Agong on the advice of Prime Minister
- Term length: No fixed term
- Inaugural holder: Too Joon Hing
- Formation: 1955

The Deputy Minister of Education (Malay: Timbalan Menteri Pendidikan; Chinese: 教育部副部长; Tamil: கல்வி பிரதி அமைச்சர் ) is a Malaysian cabinet position serving as deputy head of the Ministry of Education.

The officeholder, if, of Chinese ethnicity, is often considered the representative of the Chinese in advancing their interests in education, such as protecting the Chinese vernacular schools, recognising the Unified Examination Certificate (UEC) of the Chinese independent high school, resolving the shortage of Chinese teachers and so on.

== List of Deputy Ministers of Education ==
The following individuals have been appointed as Deputy Minister of Education, or any of its precedent titles:

Colour key (for political coalition/parties):

| Coalition | Component party | Timeline |
|---|---|---|
| Alliance Party | Malaysian Chinese Association (MCA) | 1955–1973 |
| Alliance Party | United Malays National Organisation (UMNO) | 1955–1973 |
| Barisan Nasional (BN) | Malaysian Chinese Association (MCA) | 1973–present |
| Barisan Nasional (BN) | United Malays National Organisation (UMNO) | 1973–present |
| Barisan Nasional (BN) | Parti Pesaka Bumiputera Bersatu (PBB) | 1973–2018 |
| Barisan Nasional (BN) | Malaysian Indian Congress (MIC) | 1973–present |
| Barisan Nasional (BN) | Parti Bersatu Sabah (PBS) | |
| Pakatan Harapan (PH) | Democratic Action Party (DAP) | 2015–present |
| Perikatan Nasional (PN) | Malaysian United Indigenous Party (BERSATU) | 2020–present |

=== Assistant Minister of Education (1961–1962;1964–1969) ===
| Portrait | Name (Birth–Death) Constituency | Political coalition | Political party | Took office | Left office | Prime Minister (Cabinet) |
|---|---|---|---|---|---|---|
| | Abdul Hamid Khan (?–?); MP for Batang Padang | Alliance | UMNO | 1961 | 1962 | Tunku Abdul Rahman (II) |
| | Lee Siok Yew (?–?); MP for Sepang | Alliance | MCA | 1964 | 1969 | Tunku Abdul Rahman (III) |
Initially the post Deputy Minister of Education was created, after it was downgraded to Assistant Minister of Education, subsequently changed to Deputy Minister of Education
=== Deputy Minister of Education (1955–1957;1974–present) ===
| Portrait | Name (Birth–Death) Constituency | Political coalition | Political party | Took office | Left office | Prime Minister (Cabinet) |
| | Too Joon Hing (b.?–?); MP for Kinta Selatan | Alliance | MCA | 1955 | 1957 | Tunku Abdul Rahman (I) |
| | Chan Siang Sun (b.?–?); MP for Bentong | BN | MCA | 1974 | 1982 | Abdul Razak Hussein (II); Hussein Onn (I · II); Mahathir Mohamad (I) |
| | Salleh Jafaruddin (b.?–?); Senator; MP for Mukah | BN | PBB | | | Hussein Onn (I · II) |
| | Najib Razak (b.1953); MP for Pekan | BN | UMNO | | | Hussein Onn (II) |
| | Suhaimi Kamaruddin (?–?); MP for Sepang | BN | UMNO | 1981 | 1982 | Mahathir Mohamad (I) |
| | Tan Tiong Hong (?–?); MP for Raub | BN | MCA | 30 April 1982 | 16 July 1984 | Mahathir Mohamad (II) |
| | Mohd Khalil Yaakob (b.1937); MP for Maran | BN | UMNO | 30 April 1982 | 16 July 1984 | Mahathir Mohamad (II) |
| | Rosemary Chow Poh Kheng (b.1927); MP for Ulu Langat | BN | MCA | 16 July 1984 | 25 March 1985 | Mahathir Mohamad (II) |
| | Bujang Ulis (b.?–?); MP for Simunjan | BN | PBB | 16 July 1984 | 10 August 1986 | Mahathir Mohamad (II) |
| | Ling Liong Sik (b.1943); MP for Mata Kuching | BN | MCA | 25 March 1985 | 7 January 1986 | Mahathir Mohamad (II) |
| | Ng Cheng Kiat (b.?–?); Senator | BN | MCA | 7 January 1986 | 10 August 1986 | Mahathir Mohamad (II) |
| | Woon See Chin (b.?–?); MP for Senai | BN | MCA | 11 August 1986 | 26 October 1990 | Mahathir Mohamad (III) |
| | Bujang Ulis (b.?–?); MP for Simunjan | BN | PBB | 11 August 1986 | 20 May 1987 | Mahathir Mohamad (III) |
| | Leo Michael Toyad (b.?–?); MP for Mukah | BN | PBB | 20 May 1987 | 26 October 1990 | Mahathir Mohamad (III) |
| | Fong Chan Onn (b.1944); MP for Selandar | BN | MCA | 27 October 1990 | 4 May 1995 | Mahathir Mohamad (IIII) |
| | Leo Michael Toyad (b.?–?); MP for Mukah | BN | PBB | 27 October 1990 | 4 May 1995 | Mahathir Mohamad (IIII) |
| | Mohd. Khalid Mohd. Yunos (b.1943); MP for Jempol | BN | UMNO | 8 May 1995 | 14 December 1999 | Mahathir Mohamad (V) |
| | Fong Chan Onn (b.1944); MP for Selandar | BN | MCA | 8 May 1995 | 14 December 1999 | Mahathir Mohamad (V) |
| | Abdul Aziz Shamsuddin (1938–2020); Senator | BN | UMNO | 15 December 1999 | 26 March 2004 | Mahathir Mohamad (VI); Abdullah Ahmad Badawi (I) |
| | Han Choon Kim (b.?–?); MP for Seremban | BN | MCA | 15 December 1999 | 26 March 2004 | Mahathir Mohamad (VI); Abdullah Ahmad Badawi (I) |
| | Mahadzir Mohd Khir (?–?); MP for Sungai Petani | BN | UMNO | 27 March 2004 | 14 February 2006 | Abdullah Ahmad Badawi (II) |
| | Han Choon Kim (b.?–?); MP for Seremban | BN | MCA | 27 March 2004 | 18 March 2008 | Abdullah Ahmad Badawi (II) |
| | Noh Omar (b.1958); MP for Tanjong Karang | BN | UMNO | 14 February 2006 | 18 March 2008 | Abdullah Ahmad Badawi (II) |
| | Razali Ismail (b.?–?); MP for Kuala Terengganu | BN | UMNO | 19 March 2008 | 17 January 2009 | Abdullah Ahmad Badawi (III) |
| | Wee Ka Siong (b.1968); MP for Ayer Hitam | BN | MCA | 19 March 2008 | 9 April 2009 | Abdullah Ahmad Badawi (III) |
| | Mohd Puad Zarkashi (b.1957); MP for Batu Pahat | BN | UMNO | 10 April 2009 | 15 May 2013 | Najib Razak (I) |
| | Wee Ka Siong (b.1968); MP for Ayer Hitam | BN | MCA | 10 April 2009 | 15 May 2013 | Najib Razak (I) |
| | Kamalanathan Panchanathan (b.1965); MP for Hulu Selangor | BN | MIC | 16 May 2013 | 9 May 2018 | Najib Razak (II) |
| | Mary Yap Kain Ching (b.1951); MP for Tawau | BN | PBS | 16 May 2013 | 29 July 2015 | Najib Razak (II) |
| | Chong Sin Woon (b.1973); Senator | BN | MCA | 29 July 2015 | 9 May 2018 | Najib Razak (II) |
| | Teo Nie Ching (b.1981); MP for Kulai | PH | DAP | 2 July 2018 | 24 February 2020 | Mahathir Mohamad (VII) |
| | Muslimin Yahaya (b.1967); MP for Sungai Besar | PN | BERSATU | 10 March 2020 | 16 August 2021 | Muhyiddin Yassin (I) |
| | Mah Hang Soon (b.1965); Senator | BN | MCA | 10 March 2020 | 16 August 2021 | Muhyiddin Yassin (I) |
| | Mah Hang Soon (b.1965); Senator | BN | MCA | 30 August 2021 | 24 November 2022 | Ismail Sabri Yaakob (I) |
| | Mohamad Alamin (b.1972); MP for Kimanis | BN | UMNO | 11 September 2021 | 24 November 2022 | Ismail Sabri Yaakob (I) |
| | Lim Hui Ying (b.1963); MP for Tanjong | PH | DAP | 10 December 2022 | 12 December 2023 | Anwar Ibrahim (I) |
| | Wong Kah Woh (b.1980); MP for Taiping | PH | DAP | 12 December 2023 | Incumbent | Anwar Ibrahim (I) |

== See also ==
- Minister of Education (Malaysia)
