= Deputy Minister of Women, Family and Community Development (Malaysia) =

Malaysian government deputy minister

- Timbalan Menteri Pembangunan Wanita, Keluarga dan Masyarakat
- Coat of Arms of Government of Malaysia

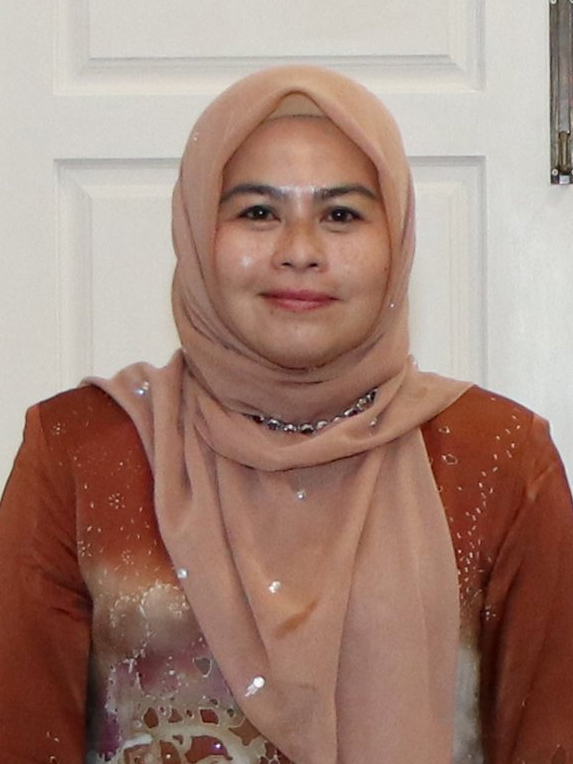
- Incumbent; Noraini Ahmad since 12 December 2023
- Ministry of Women, Family and Community Development
- Style: Yang Berhormat
- Member of: Cabinet of Malaysia
- Reports to: Prime Minister; Minister of Women, Family and Community Development
- Seat: Putrajaya
- Appointer: Yang di-Pertuan Agong; on advice of the Prime Minister
- Term length: No fixed term
- Inaugural holder: Alexander Lee Yu Lung (as Deputy Minister of National Unity and Community Development)

The Deputy Minister of Women, Family and Community Development (Malay: Timbalan Menteri Pembangunan Wanita, Keluarga dan Masyarakat; Chinese: 妇女、家庭及社区发展部副部长; Tamil: பெண்கள், குடும்பம் மற்றும் சமூக மேம்பாட்டு அமைச்சர் ) is a Malaysian cabinet position serving as deputy head of the Ministry of Women, Family and Community Development.

== List of Deputy Ministers of Women, Family and Community Development ==
The following individuals have been appointed as Deputy Minister of Women, Family and Community Development, or any of its precedent titles:

Colour key (for political coalition/parties):

Coalition	Component party	Timeline
Barisan Nasional (BN)	United Malays National Organisation (UMNO)	1973–present
Barisan Nasional (BN)	Malaysian Chinese Association (MCA)	1973–present
Barisan Nasional (BN)	Malaysian Indian Congress (MIC)	1973–present
Barisan Nasional (BN)	Sarawak National Party (SNAP)	1976–2004
Barisan Nasional (BN)	Parti Gerakan Rakyat Malaysia (Gerakan)	1973–2018
Pakatan Harapan (PH)	Democratic Action Party (DAP)	2015–present
Pakatan Harapan (PH)	National Trust Party (AMANAH)	2015–present
Perikatan Nasional (PN)	Malaysian Islamic Party (PAS)	2020–present

=== Deputy Minister of National Unity and Community Development (1990–2004) ===
Portrait	Name (Birth–Death) Constituency	Political coalition	Political party	Took office	Left office	Prime Minister (Cabinet)
	Alexander Lee Yu Lung (?–?); MP for Batu	BN	Gerakan	27 October 1990	3 May 1995	Mahathir Mohamad (IV)
	Peter Tinggom Kamarau (?–?); MP for Saratok	BN	SNAP	8 May 1995	14 December 1999	Mahathir Mohamad (V)
	Tiki Lafe (b.1954); MP for Mas Gading	BN	SNAP	15 December 1999	26 March 2004	Mahathir Mohamad (VI); Abdullah Ahmad Badawi (I)
Post renamed into Deputy Minister of Women, Family and Community Development
=== Deputy Minister of Women, Family and Community Development (2004–present) ===
Portrait	Name (Birth–Death) Constituency	Political coalition	Political party	Took office	Left office	Prime Minister (Cabinet)
	Palanivel Govindasamy (b.1949); MP for Hulu Selangor	BN	MIC	27 March 2004	18 March 2008	Abdullah Ahmad Badawi (II)
	Noriah Kasnon (1964–2016); MP for Sungai Besar	BN	UMNO	19 March 2008	9 April 2009	Abdullah Ahmad Badawi (III)
	Chew Mei Fun (b.1964); Senator	BN	MCA	10 April 2009	4 June 2010	Najib Razak (I)
	Heng Seai Kie (b.1962); Senator	BN	MCA	4 June 2010	15 May 2013	Najib Razak (I)
	Azizah Mohd Dun (b.1958); MP for Beaufort	BN	UMNO	16 May 2013	9 May 2018	Najib Razak (II)
	Chew Mei Fun (b.1964); Senator	BN	MCA	27 June 2014	9 May 2018	Najib Razak (II)
	Hannah Yeoh Tseow Suan (b.1979); MP for Segambut	PH	DAP	2 July 2018	24 February 2020	Mahathir Mohamad (VII)
	Siti Zailah Mohd Yusoff (b.1963); MP for Rantau Panjang	PN	PAS	10 March 2020	24 November 2022	Muhyiddin Yassin (I); Ismail Sabri Yaakob (I)
	Aiman Athirah Sabu (b.1972); MP for Sepang	PH	AMANAH	10 December 2022	12 December 2023	Anwar Ibrahim (I)
	Noraini Ahmad (b.1967); MP for Parit Sulong	BN	UMNO	12 December 2023	Incumbent	Anwar Ibrahim (I)

== See also ==
- Minister of Women, Family and Community Development (Malaysia)
