= Azizan Zainul Abidin =

Malaysian corporate figure and civil servant (1935–2004)

Yang Amat Berbahagia Tun Dato' Seri Azizan Zainul Abidin SSM DGPN PNBS PSM JMN
- عزيزان زین العابدین

President and chief executive officer of Petronas
- In office February 1988 – February 1995
- Minister: Mahathir Mohamad
- Succeeded by: Hassan Marican

Personal details
- Born: Azizan bin Zainul Abidin; 28 May 1935 Penang, Malaysia
- Died: 14 July 2004 (aged 69)
- Spouse: Toh Puan Noor Ainee Che Teh
- Children: Amir Hamzah Azizan
- Education: University of Malaya (BA)

Tun Dato' Seri Azizan bin Zainul Abidin (Jawi: عزيزان بن زین العابدین; 28 May 1935 – 14 July 2004) was a Malaysian corporate figure and civil servant who was the former chairman, president and chief executive officer (CEO) of Petronas. He was the father of Amir Hamzah Azizan, the Minister of Finance II, senator and former CEO of the Employees Provident Fund (EPF).

== Early life and education ==
Azizan was born on 28 May 1935, in Air Itam, Penang. He had 3 children with his wife Noor Ainne Che Teh: Amir Hamzah Azizan, Norizan Azizan and Ikhwan Azizan and 7 grandchildren. He studied at Penang Free School and later pursued his tertiary education at the University of Malaya where he graduated with a Bachelor of Arts in Malay Studies.

== Career ==
In 1960, he joined the Ministry of Education. In 1988, he retired as the secretary general (KSU) of the Ministry of Home Affairs.

== Post-government career ==
Azizan joined Petronas as President and CEO, holding the position from February 1988 to February 1995 under the recommendation of Prime Minister Mahathir Mohamad. In addition, he was chairman of Malaysia Airlines, Putrajaya Corporation, KLCC Holdings (M) Sdn Bhd, Petronas Carigali Sdn Bhd, MTBE Malaysia Sdn Bhd, Petronas Trading Limited, Malaysia LNG Sdn Bhd and Suria KLCC Sdn Bhd. He is remembered for his work in developing Putrajaya, the Federal Government Administrative Centre.

He was appointed Pro-Chancellor of Universiti Teknologi Malaysia (UTM) and a member of the World Economic Forum; Kuala Lumpur hosted the forum in 2002. He was Chairman of the ASEAN-Canada Business Council, Treasurer of the Crime Prevention Foundation and a Member of the Management Improvement Commission of the Royal Malaysian Police.

== Death ==
Azizan died on 14 July 2004 at the age of 68, and was buried at the Muslim Cemetery in Taman Selatan, Putrajaya.

== Honours ==
On 5 June 2010, five years after his death, he was posthumously awarded the Malaysian federal highest award, the Seri Setia Mahkota Malaysia (SSM), which carries the title "Tun" in conjunction with the birthday of the 13th Yang di-Pertuan Agong, Tuanku Mizan Zainal Abidin, at Istana Negara, Kuala Lumpur.

He also received the Order of the Commander of the Legion of Honour from the French government in October 2003, the Norwegian government award for "outstanding contribution to quality" in management in 1992 and the Vietnam Friendship Medal by the government in September 2001.

=== Honours of Malaysia ===
- Malaysia
  - Companion of the Order of the Defender of the Realm (JMN) (1978)
  - Commander of the Order of Loyalty to the Crown of Malaysia (PSM) – Tan Sri (1987)
  - Grand Commander of the Order of Loyalty to the Crown of Malaysia (SSM) – Tun (2010 – posthumously)
- Sarawak
  - Knight Commander of the Most Exalted Order of the Star of Sarawak (PNBS) – Dato Sri (1991)
- Penang
  - Commander of the Order of the Defender of State (DGPN) – Dato' Seri (2001)

=== Legacy ===
The KA Tun Azizan, a cargo ship, converted by Petronas for use in the Eastern Sabah Security Zone is named after him.
