= Ahmad Husni Hanadzlah =

Former Second Minister of Finance Malaysia

Yang Berbahagia Dato' Seri Ahmad Husni Hanadzlah SPMP DPMP PPT JP
- أحمد حسني حنظلة
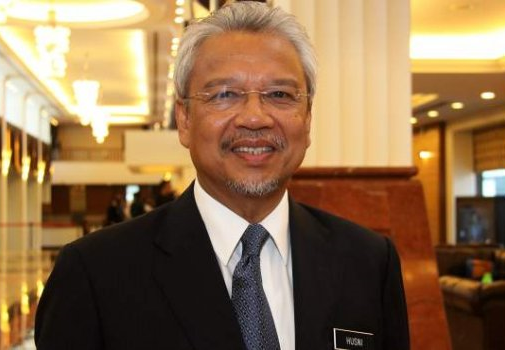
- Ahmad in 2013

Minister of Finance II
- In office 10 April 2009 – 27 June 2016 Serving with Najib Razak (Minister of Finance I)
- Monarch: Abdul Halim
- Deputy: Awang Adek Hussin (Deputy Minister of Finance I) (2009–2013); Chor Chee Heung (Deputy Minister of Finance II) (2009–2010); Donald Lim Siang Chai (2010–2013); Ahmad Maslan (Deputy Minister of Finance I) (2013–2015); Johari Abdul Ghani (2015–2016); Chua Tee Yong (Deputy Minister of Finance II) (2014–2016)
- Preceded by: Nor Mohamed Yakcop
- Succeeded by: Johari Abdul Ghani
- Constituency: Tambun

Deputy Minister of Finance I
- In office 19 March 2008 – 9 April 2009 Serving with Kong Cho Ha (Deputy Minister of Finance II)
- Monarch: Mizan Zainal Abidin
- Prime Minister: Abdullah Ahmad Badawi
- Minister: Abdullah Ahmad Badawi (March 2008–September 2008); Nor Mohamed Yakcop (2008–2009); Najib Razak (September 2008–April 2009)
- Preceded by: Awang Adek Hussin
- Succeeded by: Awang Adek Hussin
- Constituency: Tambun

Deputy Minister of International Trade and Industry I
- In office 27 March 2004 – 18 March 2008 Serving with Mah Siew Keong (Deputy Minister of International Trade and Industry II) (2004–2006); Ng Lip Yong (2006–2008)
- Monarchs: Sirajuddin; Mizan Zainal Abidin
- Prime Minister: Abdullah Ahmad Badawi
- Minister: Rafidah Aziz
- Preceded by: Kerk Choo Ting
- Succeeded by: Liew Vui Keong
- Constituency: Tambun

Member of the Malaysian Parliament for Tambun
- In office 25 April 1995 – 9 May 2018
- Majority: 26,639 (1995); 7,084 (1999); 17,360 (2004); 5,386 (2008); 9,325 (2013)

Faction represented in Dewan Rakyat
- 1995–2018: Barisan Nasional

Personal details
- Born: Ahmad Husni bin Mohamad Hanadzlah; 21 July 1951 (age 75) Perak, Federation of Malaya (now Malaysia)
- Citizenship: Malaysian
- Party: United Malays National Organisation (UMNO)
- Other political affiliations: Barisan Nasional (BN)
- Spouse: Fauziah Kamarudin
- Education: University of Malaya; Bachelor's degree (Economics)
- Occupation: Politician, economist

Ahmad Husni bin Mohamad Hanadzlah (Jawi: أحمد حسني بن محمد حنظلة; born 21 July 1951) is a former Second Minister of Finance of Malaysia. He was appointed on 10 April 2009 when Najib Razak became Prime Minister. He was also the Member of Parliament for Tambun for five terms from April 1995 to May 2018. He is a member of the United Malays National Organisation (UMNO), a major component party in the Barisan Nasional (BN) coalition.

Husni was educated at the University of Malaya. He entered the government sector in 1984 as general manager of the Perak State Islamic Economic Corporation. Ahmad Husni was a Deputy Minister of International Trade and Industry and Deputy Finance Minister before becoming a minister.

== Career ==
- 1978 - Manager at AsiaVest Merchant bankers Berhad
- 1989 - General Manager of Perak Islamic Economic Development Corporation
- 1997 - Chairman of National Higher Education Fund Corporation (PTPTN)
- 2001 - Chairman of the Commercial Vehicle Licensing Board
- 2002 - MATRADE chairman
- 2003 - Public Accounts Committee (PAC)
- 2009 - Director of Khazanah Nasional Berhad

== Politics ==
- 1983 - Started joining the UMNO branch of Sungai Rokam
- 1983 - Member of the UMNO Youth Division of the Tambun Youth Movement
- 1985 - Tambun Umno Division Youth Vice Chairman
- 1987 - Tambun Umno Division Youth Chief
- 1993 - Tambun Umno Division Chief

== Elections ==
In the 1999 Malaysian general election, Election Commission (EC) declared Ahmad Husni has won the Tambun parliamentary seat with a majority of 7,084. In the 2004 Malaysian general election, Ahmad Husni defeated Dr Khairuddin Abd Malek from PAS with a majority of 17,360. In the 2008 Malaysian general election, Ahmad Husni once again defended the Tambun parliamentary seat with 27,942 votes. His PKR opponent was the former Dermawan assemblyman Mohamad Asri Othman, who received 22,556 votes. The turnout percentage is 75%. The total of rejected ballots are 927.

== 1MDB scandal ==
In October 2016, Husni being the only MP from the incumbent government to submit a question on 1Malaysia Development Berhad scandal (1MDB).

On 3 November 2016, Husni with 2 former cabinet ministers, Muhyiddin Yassin and Shafie Apdal were convicted of the Sedition Act 1948 for breaching and debating debt-laden companies, 1MDB.

== Election results ==
Parliament of Malaysia
Year	Constituency	Candidate	Votes	Pct	Opponent(s)	Votes	Pct	Ballots cast	Majority	Turnout
1995	P060 Tambun	Ahmad Husni Hanadzlah (UMNO)	33,224	83.46%	Abd Rahman Md Nur (S46)	6,585	16.54%	42,732	26,639	72.96%
1999	P060 Tambun	Ahmad Husni Hanadzlah (UMNO)	24,595	58.41%	Khairuddin Abd Malik (PAS)	17,511	41.59%	44,832	7,084	70.74%
2004	P063 Tambun	Ahmad Husni Hanadzlah (UMNO)	31,824	68.75%	Khairuddin Abd Malik (PAS)	9,950	31.25%	47,571	17,360	72.94%
2008	P063 Tambun	Ahmad Husni Hanadzlah (UMNO)	27,942	55.33%	Mohd Asri Othman (PKR)	22,556	44.67%	51,844	5,386	75.17%
2013	P063 Tambun	Ahmad Husni Hanadzlah (UMNO)	42,093	56.23%	Siti Aishah Shaik Ahmad (PKR)	32,768	43.77%	76,275	9,325	85.29%
2018	P063 Tambun	Ahmad Husni Hanadzlah (UMNO)	33,341	38.35%	Ahmad Faizal Azumu (BERSATU)	38,661	44.46%	88,920	5,320	82.51%
2018	P063 Tambun	Ahmad Husni Hanadzlah (UMNO)	33,341	38.35%	Muhd Zulkifli Mohd Zakaria (PAS)	14,948	17.19%	88,920	5,320	82.51%

== Honours ==
- Perak
  - Knight Grand Commander of the Order of the Perak State Crown (SPMP) – Dato' Seri (2009)
  - Knight Commander of the Order of the Perak State Crown (DPMP) – Dato' (2000)
  - Recipient of the Distinguished Conduct Medal (PPT) (1988)
  - Justice of the Peace (JP) (1996)

== See also ==
- Tambun (federal constituency)
