= Ministry of Women, Family and Community Development =

Government ministry of Malaysia

- Kementerian Pembangunan Wanita, Keluarga dan Masyarakat (KPWKM) كمنترين ڤمباڠونن وانيتا، كلوارڬ دان مشاركت
- Coat of arms of Malaysia

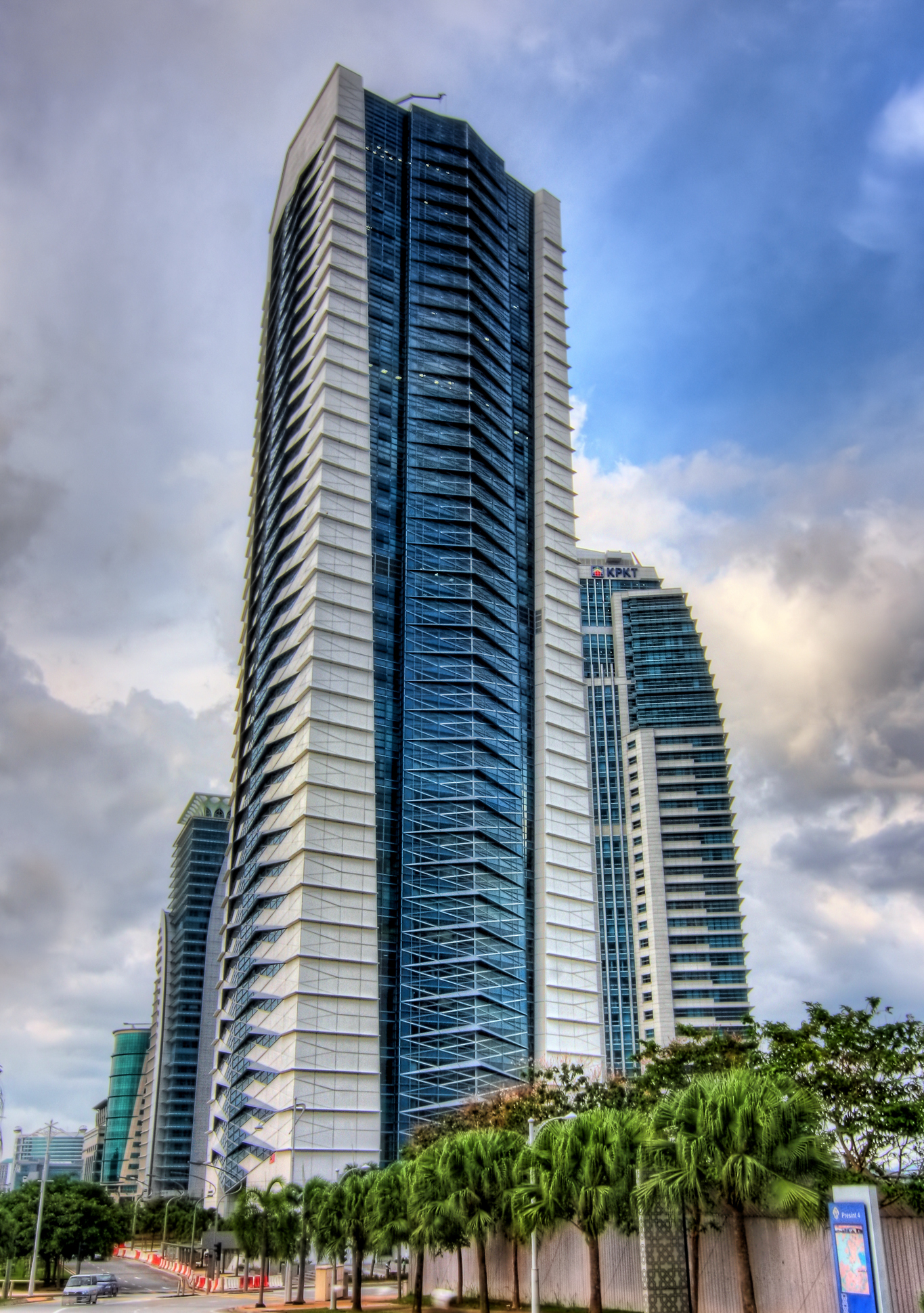
- KPWKM Tower (formerly Lot 4G11)

Ministry overview
- Formed: 17 January 2001; 25 years ago
- Preceding Ministry: Ministry of Women and Family Development
- Jurisdiction: Government of Malaysia
- Headquarters: KPWKM Tower, Persiaran Perdana, Precinct 4, Federal Government Administrative Centre, 62100 Putrajaya
- Employees: 7,888 (2017)
- Annual budget: MYR 4,187,963,600 (2026)
- Minister responsible: Dato' Sri Hajah Nancy binti Shukri, Minister of Women, Family and Community Development
- Deputy Minister responsible: Lim Hui Ying, Deputy Minister of Women, Family and Community Development
- Ministry executives: Datuk Dr. Maziah Che Yusoff, Secretary-General; Farah Adura binti Hamidi, Deputy Secretary-General (Operations); Mohd Daud bin Mohd Arif, Deputy Secretary-General (Strategic)
- Website: www.kpwkm.gov.my

Footnotes
- Ministry of Women, Family and Community Development on Facebook

The Ministry of Women, Family and Community Development (Malay: Kementerian Pembangunan Wanita, Keluarga dan Masyarakat; Jawi: كمنترين ڤمباڠونن وانيتا، كلوارڬ دان مشاركت), abbreviated KPWKM, is a ministry of the Government of Malaysia responsible for social welfare: children, women, family, community, older people, destitute, homeless, disaster victim, disabled. The ministry determines the policies and direction to achieve the goals of gender equality, family development and a caring society in line with Malaysia's commitment towards the United Nations' Convention on the Elimination of All Forms of Discrimination Against Women and the Beijing Declaration.

== Background ==
Following the Fourth World Conference on Women organised by the United Nations in Beijing, China in 1995, efforts to establish a cabinet-level body to aid the Malaysian Government in realising its aspiration towards elevating the status of women were made.

KPWKM was officially established on 17 January 2001 as the Ministry of Women's Affairs with Datuk Seri Shahrizat Abdul Jalil acting as the first cabinet-level Minister to solely focus on the development of women. The scope of the Ministry was widened to include family development and the name was changed to the Ministry of Women and Family Development on 15 February 2001. In 2004, the scope was further widened to include social welfare and development and the Ministry adopted its current name on 27 March 2004.

Following the 14th General Elections, the Deputy Prime Minister, YAB Datuk Seri Wan Azizah Wan Ismail (PKR), was appointed Minister of Women, Family and Community Development on May 21, 2018. She succeeds YB Dato Sri Rohani Abdul Karim (PBB).

The following departments and agencies are under the purview of the KPWKM:

- Department for Women's Development (Jabatan Pembangunan Wanita)

In 1975, the Government set up the National Advisory Council on the Integration of Women in Development (NACIWID) as the machinery to ensure the involvement of women in development. In 1983, the Secretariat for Women's Affairs (HAWA) in the Prime Minister's Department was established to take over the tasks of the NACIWID Secretariat. From 1997, HAWA functioned as a department under the former Ministry of National Unity and Social Development. In 2001, the Department was placed under the then newly established KPWKM and restructured as the Department for Women's Development (DWD). By 2002, the DWD had set up branch offices in every state in Malaysia.

- Social Welfare Department (Jabatan Kebajikan Masyarakat)

Initially set up in 1946 as the Community Welfare Department of Malaya, the Social Welfare Department (SWD) has evolved in fulfilling its role in national development. From initially being involved in mitigating the social problems brought about by the immediate post-war period, the role and functions of this department have expanded to cover prevention and rehabilitation services in social issues as well as community development.

- National Population and Family Development Board (Lembaga Penduduk dan Pembangunan Keluarga Negara)

The National Population and Family Development Board (NPFDB) was established in 1966 to improve the reproductive health status of women and men and encourage family planning. It has since evolved to include policy and advisory roles by assisting planners and programme managers to integrate population and family development into sectoral development programme planning as well as facilitate policy makers to consider population and family development factors in the formulation of national development policies and strategies.

- Social Institute of Malaysia (Institut Sosial Malaysia)

The Social Institute of Malaysia was set up to promote professional and semi-professional training in the field of training and research as well as social education to all social workers from various levels and groups from within and outside the country including non-governmental organisations. It currently operates from a 50-acre (200,000 m^{2}) campus in Sungai Besi that was completed in 2001.

- Counsellors Board (Lembaga Kaunselor)

In the 2004 Cabinet reshuffle, the Counsellor Board and its administration was placed under the Ministry of Women, Family and Community Development. The unit was then led by a Registrar in the Board's Management Unit. The Board is responsible for all matters pertaining to the enforcement of the Counsellors Act 1998 [Act 580].

== Organisation ==
- Minister of Women, Family and Community Development
  - Deputy Minister of Women, Family and Community Development
  - Second Deputy Minister of Women, Family and Community Development
    - Secretary-General
      - Under the Authority of Secretary-General
        - National Key Result Area Unit
        - Corporate Communication Unit
        - Legal Advisory Unit
        - Board of Counsellors Secretariat
        - Internal Audit Unit
        - Integrity Unit
      - Deputy Secretary-General (Operations)
        - Information Management Division
        - Development Division
        - Management Services Division
        - Account Division
        - Human Resource Management Division
        - Finance Division
      - Deputy Secretary-General (Strategic)
        - Policy and Strategic Planning Division
        - International Relations Division
        - Strategic Collaboration Division

=== Federal departments ===
1. Department of Social Welfare (Malay: Jabatan Kebajikan Masyarakat, JKM) (Official website)
2. Department of Women’s Development, (Malay: Jabatan Pembangunan Wanita, JPW). (Official website)

=== Federal agencies ===
1. National Population and Family Development Board (Malay: Lembaga Penduduk dan Pembangunan Keluarga Malaysia, LPPKN) (Official website)
2. Non-Aligned Movement Institute for the Empowerment of Women (NIEW, Malay: Institut Pengupayaan Wanita bagi Anggota Negara-negara Berkecuali) (Official website)
3. Social Institute of Malaysia (Malay: Institut Sosial Malaysia, ISM) (Official website)
4. National Welfare Foundation of Malaysia (Malay: Yayasan Kebajikan Negara Malaysia, YKNM) (Official website)
5. Counsellors Board (Malay: Lembaga Kaunselor Malaysia, LKM) (Official website)

== Key legislation ==
A number of Acts of Parliament are assigned to or affect the Ministry. These include:

Acts of Parliament	Enforcing Authority
Adoption Act 1954 [Act 257]	Related to the Ministry, but enforced by other Ministry or Agency.
Care Centres Act 1993 [Act 503]	Under the purview of the Social Welfare Department.
Child Act 2001 [Act 611]	Under the purview of the Social Welfare Department.
Child Care Centre Act 1984 [Act 308]	Under the purview of the Social Welfare Department.
Counsellors Act 1998 [Act 580]	Under the Purview of the Counsellors Board.
Destitute Persons Act 1977 [Act 183]	Under the purview of the Social Welfare Department.
Domestic Violence Act 1994 [Act 521]	Under the Purview of the Social Welfare Department.
Law Reform (Marriage and Divorce) Act 1976 [Act 164]	Related to the Ministry, but enforced by other Ministry or Agency.
Maintenance Orders (Facilities for Enforcement) Act 1949 [Act 34]	Related to the Ministry, but enforced by other Ministry or Agency.
Married Women Act 1957 [Act 450]	Related to the Ministry, but enforced by other Ministry or Agency.
Married Women and Children (Maintenance) Act 1950 [Act 263]	Related to the Ministry, but enforced by other Ministry or Agency.
Married Women and Children (Enforcement of Maintenance) Act 1968 [Act 794] - Revised 2017	Related to the Ministry, but enforced by other Ministry or Agency.
Population and Family Development Act 1966 [Act 352]	Under the purview of the National Population and Family Development Board.
Registration of Adoptions Act 1952 [Act 253]	Related to the Ministry, but enforced by other Ministry or Agency.

== Initiatives ==
=== Strategies ===
- To ensure that gender, family and community perspectives are incorporated in the formulation of policies and plans as well as in the implementation of programs;
- To instill positives family values among the people by working with Government agencies, private sector and NGO's;
- To review existing laws and regulations and to suggest new legislation that are able to afford better protection for the livelihood and development of women, family and the community;
- To undertake research and development on gender, population, family and community development in order to introduce innovative approaches in the planning and implementation of programs so as;
- To develop and strengthen a comprehensive and integrated social database for the purpose of planning, monitoring and evaluation of programs for target groups;
- To increase the level of skills and knowledge as well as to empower target groups to enable their effective participation in nation buildings;
- To increase and diversify the opportunities for target groups towards enhancing their effective participation in nation building;
- To strengthen the networking both at the national and international levels to facilitate the sharing of information, experience and expertise;
- To establish effective monitoring and evaluating mechanism to improve the implementation of policies and programs;
- To increase access to information and communication technology (ICT) for women, families and community;
- To consolidate and strengthen services delivery systems at all levels through professional and optimal human resources, financial and technology management and;
- To disseminate information on facilities and services provided by various agencies and organisations for the benefits of women, family and the community.

=== Policies ===
Policy guidelines developed and adopted to date include:

- National Social Policy

Officially adopted by the Government in 2003, the NSP seeks to create a progressive and established Malaysian society with every member having the opportunity to develop his/her potential to the optimum in a healthy social environment based on the qualities of unity, resilience, democracy, morality, tolerance, progress, care, fairness and equity.

- National Policy On Women

The main objectives of this policy are to ensure an equitable sharing in the acquisition of resources, information, opportunities and benefits of development for men and women. The objectives of equality and justice must be made the essence of development policies which must be people oriented so the women, who constitute half the nation's population, can contribute and realize their potentials to the optimum; and to integrate women in all sectors of development in accordance with their capabilities and needs, in order to enhance the quality of life, eradicate poverty, ignorance and illiteracy, and ensure a peaceful and prosperous nation. KPWKM has also gotten the Government to agree towards achieving a minimum of a 30% representation of women in decision making positions in the public sector.

- National Social Welfare Policy

In seeking to achieve a contented and strong society for national development, the NSWP shall develop human potential to the optimum and to strengthen society to face current social challenges, create various facilities for enhancing self-development and development of the individual, and build and inculcate the spirit of mutual help and assistance to reinforce a caring culture.

- National Policy for the Elderly

This policy was adopted to establish a society of the elderly who are contented, dignified, possessed of a high sense of self-worth, and optimising their potential, as well as to ensure that they enjoy all opportunities besides being given the care and protection as members of a family, society and the nation.

== Ministers ==
Minister	Portrait	Office	Executive Experience
Nancy Shukri		Minister of Women, Family and Community Development	MP for Batang Sadong (March 2008 – November 2022); Minister in the Prime Minister's Department (May 2013 – May 2018); Minister of Tourism, Arts and Culture (March 2020 – November 2022); MP for Santubong (November 2022 – current)
Lim Hui Ying		Deputy Minister of Women, Family and Community Development	Senator (August 2018 – November 2022); Deputy Minister of Education (December 2022 – December 2023); Deputy Minister of Finance (December 2023 – December 2025); MP for Tanjong (November 2022 – current)

== See also ==
- Minister of Women, Family and Community Development (Malaysia)
- Women's rights
- Reproductive rights
- United Nations Commission on the Status of Women
