= Amir Hamzah Azizan =

Malaysian politician and corporate figure

Yang Berhormat Senator Datuk Seri Amir Hamzah Azizan DGSM
- أمير حمزه عزيزان
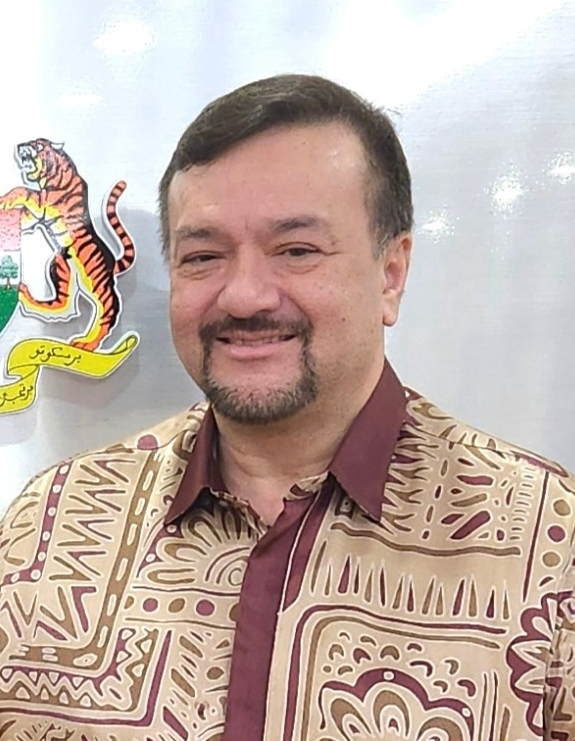
- Amir Hamzah Azizan in 2024

Minister of Finance II
- Incumbent
- Assumed office 12 December 2023 Serving with Anwar Ibrahim (Minister of Finance I)
- Monarchs: Abdullah (2023–2024); Ibrahim Iskandar (since 2024)
- Prime Minister: Anwar Ibrahim
- Deputy: Lim Hui Ying (2023–2025); Liew Chin Tong (since 2025)
- Preceded by: Johari Abdul Ghani
- Constituency: Senator

Minister of Economy
- Acting
- In office 27 June 2025 – 17 December 2025
- Monarch: Ibrahim
- Prime Minister: Anwar Ibrahim
- Deputy: Hanifah Hajar Taib
- Preceded by: Rafizi Ramli
- Constituency: Senator

Senator Appointed by the Yang di-Pertuan Agong
- Incumbent
- Assumed office 12 December 2023
- Monarchs: Abdullah (2023–2024); Ibrahim Iskandar (since 2024)
- Prime Minister: Anwar Ibrahim

Chief Executive Officer of the Employees Provident Fund
- In office 1 March 2021 – 12 December 2023
- Minister: Tengku Zafrul Aziz (2021–2022); Anwar Ibrahim (2022–2023)
- Chairman: Ahmad Badri Mohd Zahir
- Preceded by: Tunku Alizakri Alias
- Succeeded by: Ahmad Zulqarnain Onn

Personal details
- Born: Amir Hamzah bin Azizan; 13 April 1967 (age 59) Penang, Malaysia
- Party: Independent
- Parents: Azizan Zainul Abidin (father); Toh Puan Noor Ainee Che Teh (mother)
- Education: Syracuse University (BSc)
- Occupation: Corporate figure
- Amir Hamzah Azizan on LinkedIn

Amir Hamzah bin Azizan (Jawi: أمير حمزه عزيزان, Malay pronunciation: [amir hamzah]; born 1967) is a Malaysian politician and corporate figure who has served as the Minister of Finance II and Senator since December 2023. He served as the chief executive officer (CEO) of the Employees Provident Fund (EPF) from March 2021 to his resignation and political appointment in December 2023. He is the eldest son of Azizan Zainul Abidin, the former Chairman, President and CEO of Petronas.

== Early life and education ==
Amir was born in Penang and moved to Kuala Lumpur at an early age with his other two siblings, one of them Ikhwan Azizan worked under his previous role at Petronas. Amir holds a Bachelor of Science degree in management (Finance and Economics) from Syracuse University, New York. He has also attended the Stanford Executive Program at Stanford University, United States, and the Corporate Finance Program at London Business School, United Kingdom.

== Career ==
He began his corporate career at Royal Dutch Shell for 10 years, serving in various capacities, including Head of Financial Services and Manager, Planning & Support at Sarawak Shell Berhad, Corporate Finance Executive at Shell Malaysia Limited, Marketing Credit Accountant at Shell Singapore Pte Ltd, Internal Auditor at Shell Eastern Petroleum Pte Ltd, and Senior Treasury Advisor at Shell International Ltd, London.

In 2000, Amir joined MISC Berhad as Group General Manager, Corporate Planning Services. Following in 2004, he held the position of Regional Business Director (Europe, America, Africa and FSU) at MISC Berhad in London, United Kingdom before being appointed president and chief executive officer (CEO) of AET Tanker Holdings Sdn Bhd on 1 April 2005.

He then held the position of managing director and CEO of Petronas Dagangan Berhad from 15 June 2010 to 31 August 2012, when he became a managing director and CEO of Petronas Lubricants International. He was also the Vice President of Downstream Marketing from 1 March 2011 until 1 July 2013, when he became the Vice President of Lubricants for Petronas. In March 2016, he became the managing director of Icon Offshore Berhad, and on 1 December 2017, he joined the Khazanah Nasional Berhad unit, Themed Attractions Resorts & Hotel Sdn Bhd as Group CEO.

Amir was promoted as president and CEO of MISC Berhad from 1 January 2009 until 14 June 2010, and on 29 August 2016, he has led UEM Edgenta as its chairman. Amir has also led Tenaga Nasional Berhad (TNB) as its chief executive officer in 2019 until 2021. Amir held the position of CEO of the Employees' Provident Fund from 1 March 2021 to 12 December 2023, replacing Tunku Alizakri Alias, Member of the Board of Sime Darby as well as the Chairman of Malaysian Resources Corp Berhad (MRCB). He was appointed a Senator and Minister of Finance II in 12 December 2023.

== Honours and awards ==
=== Honours of Malaysia ===
- Malaysia
  - Recipient of the 17th Yang di-Pertuan Agong Installation Medal
- Malacca
  - Grand Commander of the Exalted Order of Malacca (DGSM) – Datuk Seri (2019)
