= Fourth Mahathir cabinet =

- 12th Cabinet of Malaysia

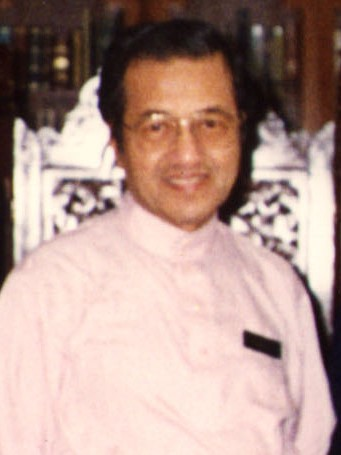

People and organisations
- Head of state: Tuanku Azlan Shah (1990–1994); Tuanku Jaafar (1994–1995)
- Head of government: Mahathir Mohamad
- Deputy head of government: Abdul Ghafar Baba (1990–1993); Anwar Ibrahim (1993–1995)
- Member parties: Barisan Nasional: United Malays National Organisation; Malaysian Chinese Association; United Traditional Bumiputera Party; Malaysian Indian Congress; United Sabah National Organisation; Malaysian People's Movement Party; Sarawak Native People's Party; Sarawak United Peoples' Party; Sarawak National Party
- Status in legislature: Coalition government
- Opposition parties: Democratic Action Party; United Sabah Party; Semangat 46; Pan-Malaysian Islamic Party
- Opposition leader: Lim Kit Siang

History
- Election: 1990 Malaysian general election
- Outgoing election: 1995 Malaysian general election
- Legislature term: 8th Malaysian Parliament
- Budgets: 1991, 1992, 1993, 1994, 1995
- Predecessor: Third Mahathir cabinet
- Successor: Fifth Mahathir cabinet

Mahathir Mohamad formed the fourth Mahathir cabinet after being invited by Tuanku Azlan Shah to begin a new government following the 21 October 1990 general election in Malaysia. Prior to the election, Mahathir led (as prime minister) the third Mahathir cabinet, a coalition government that consisted of members of the component parties of Barisan Nasional. It was the 12th cabinet of Malaysia formed since independence.

This is a list of the members of the fourth cabinet of the fourth prime minister of Malaysia, Mahathir Mohamad.

== Composition ==
=== Full members ===
The federal cabinet consisted of the following ministers:

Portfolio	Office bearer	Party	Constituency	Term start	Term end
Prime Minister	Dato' Seri Dr. Mahathir Mohamad MP	UMNO	Kubang Pasu	27 October 1990	3 May 1995
Deputy Prime Minister	Abdul Ghafar Baba MP	UMNO	Jasin	27 October 1990	15 October 1993
Deputy Prime Minister	Dato' Sri Anwar Ibrahim MP	UMNO	Permatang Pauh	1 December 1993	3 May 1995
Minister in the Prime Minister's Department	Dato' Syed Hamid Albar MP	UMNO	Kota Tinggi	27 October 1990	3 May 1995
Minister in the Prime Minister's Department	Abu Bakar Mustapha MP	PBB	Kuala Rajang	27 October 1990	3 May 1995
Minister in the Prime Minister's Department	Datuk Bernard Giluk Dompok MP	PDS	Penampang	21 August 1994	3 May 1995
Minister of Finance	Dato' Sri Daim Zainuddin MP	UMNO	Merbok	27 October 1990	15 March 1991
Minister of Finance	Dato' Sri Anwar Ibrahim MP	UMNO	Permatang Pauh	15 March 1991	3 May 1995
Minister of Defence	Dato Sri Mohd. Najib Abdul Razak MP	UMNO	Pekan	27 October 1990	3 May 1995
Minister of Home Affairs	Dato' Seri Mahathir Mohamad MP	UMNO	Kubang Pasu	27 October 1990	3 May 1995
Minister of Justice	Dato' Syed Hamid Albar MP	UMNO	Kota Tinggi	27 October 1990	3 May 1995
Minister of International Trade and Industry	Dato' Seri Rafidah Aziz MP	UMNO	Kuala Kangsar	27 October 1990	3 May 1995
Minister of Education	Dato' Sri Anwar Ibrahim MP	UMNO	Permatang Pauh	27 October 1990	15 March 1991
Minister of Education	Datuk Amar Sulaiman Daud MP	PBB	Petra Jaya	15 March 1991	3 May 1995
Minister of Lands and Co-operatives Development	Tan Sri Sakaran Dandai MP	UMNO	Semporna	27 October 1990	16 March 1994
Minister of Lands and Co-operatives Development	Datuk Osu Sukam MP	UMNO	Papar	21 August 1994	3 May 1995
Minister of Transport	Dato' Seri Dr. Ling Liong Sik MP	MCA	Labis	27 October 1990	3 May 1995
Minister of Agriculture	Dato' Seri Sanusi Junid MP	UMNO	Jerlun-Langkawi	27 October 1990	3 May 1995
Minister of Health	Dato' Lee Kim Sai MP	MCA	Hulu Langat	27 October 1990	3 May 1995
Minister of Culture, Arts and Tourism	Dato' Sabbaruddin Chik MP	UMNO	Temerloh	27 October 1990	3 May 1995
Minister of Housing and Local Government	Dato' Dr. Ting Chew Peh MP	MCA	Gopeng	27 October 1990	3 May 1995
Minister of Foreign Affairs	Dato' Seri Abu Hassan Omar MP	UMNO	Kuala Selangor	27 October 1990	15 March 1991
Minister of Foreign Affairs	Dato' Abdullah Ahmad Badawi MP	UMNO	Kepala Batas	15 March 1991	3 May 1995
Minister of Human Resources	Dato' Lim Ah Lek MP	MCA	Bentong	27 October 1990	3 May 1995
Minister of Domestic Trade and Consumerism	Datuk Amar Sulaiman Daud MP	PBB	Petra Jaya	27 October 1990	15 March 1991
Minister of Domestic Trade and Consumerism	Dato' Seri Abu Hassan Omar MP	UMNO	Kuala Selangor	15 March 1991	3 May 1995
Minister of Public Enterprises	Mohamed Yusof Mohamed Noor MP	UMNO	Besut	27 October 1990	3 May 1995
Minister of Rural Development	Abdul Ghafar Baba MP	UMNO	Jasin	27 October 1990	15 October 1993
Minister of Rural Development	Dato' Annuar Musa	UMNO	Senator	1 December 1993	3 May 1995
Minister of Works	Dato Sri Leo Moggie Irok MP	PBDS	Kanowit	27 October 1990	3 May 1995
Minister of Science, Technology and Environment	Dato Sri Law Hieng Ding MP	SUPP	Sarikei	27 October 1990	3 May 1995
Minister of Energy, Telecommunications and Posts	Dato' Seri Samy Vellu MP	MIC	Sungai Siput	27 October 1990	3 May 1995
Minister for Primary Industries	Dato' Seri Lim Keng Yaik MP	Gerakan	Beruas	27 October 1990	3 May 1995
Minister of National Unity and Community Development	Dato' Napsiah Omar MP	UMNO	Kuala Pilah	27 October 1990	3 May 1995
Minister of Youth and Sports	Dato' Annuar Musa	UMNO	Senator	27 October 1990	1 December 1993
Minister of Youth and Sports	Abdul Ghani Othman MP	UMNO	Ledang	1 December 1993	3 May 1995
Minister of Information	Dato' Mohamed Rahmat MP	UMNO	Pulai	27 October 1990	3 May 1995

=== Deputy ministers ===
Portfolio	Office bearer	Party	Constituency	Term start	Term end
Deputy Minister in the Prime Minister's Department	Abdul Hamid Othman MP	UMNO	Sik	27 October 1990	3 May 1995
Deputy Minister in the Prime Minister's Department	Raja Ariffin Raja Sulaiman MP	UMNO	Baling	27 October 1990	3 May 1995
Deputy Minister in the Prime Minister's Department	Dato' Suleiman Mohamed MP	UMNO	Titiwangsa	27 October 1990	3 May 1995
Deputy Minister in the Prime Minister's Department	Dato' Wong See Wah MP	MCA	Rasah	27 October 1990	3 May 1995
Deputy Minister of Finance	Abdul Ghani Othman MP	UMNO	Ledang	27 October 1990	1 December 1993
Deputy Minister of Finance	Dato' Loke Yuen Yow MP	MCA	Tanjong Malim	27 October 1990	3 May 1995
Deputy Minister of Finance	Dato' Mustapa Mohamed	UMNO	Senator	1 December 1993	3 May 1995
Deputy Minister of Defence	Wan Abu Bakar Wan Mohamed MP	UMNO	Jerantut	27 October 1990	3 May 1995
Deputy Minister of Home Affairs	Megat Junid Megat Ayub MP	UMNO	Pasir Salak	27 October 1990	3 May 1995
Deputy Minister of International Trade and Industry	Chua Jui Meng MP	MCA	Bakri	27 October 1990	3 May 1995
Deputy Minister of Education	Datuk Fong Chan Onn MP	MCA	Selandar	27 October 1990	4 May 1995
Deputy Minister of Education	Leo Michael Toyad MP	PBB	Mukah	27 October 1990	4 May 1995
Deputy Minister of Lands and Co-operatives Development	Dato' Mohd. Khalid Mohd. Yunos MP	UMNO	Jempol	27 October 1990	3 May 1995
Deputy Minister of Transport	Datin Paduka Hajah Zaleha Ismail MP	UMNO	Selayang	27 October 1990	3 May 1995
Deputy Minister of Agriculture	Prof Dr T. Marimuthu MP	MIC	Telok Kemang	1 December 1993	3 May 1995
Deputy Minister of Health	Mohd Farid Ariffin MP	UMNO	Balik Pulau	27 October 1990	3 May 1995
Deputy Minister of Culture, Arts and Tourism	Dato' Chan Kong Choy MP	MCA	Lipis	27 October 1990	3 May 1995
Deputy Minister of Housing and Local Government	Daud Taha MP	UMNO	Batu Pahat	27 October 1990	3 May 1995
Deputy Minister of Housing and Local Government	Osu Sukam MP	UMNO	Papar	27 October 1990	21 August 1994
Deputy Minister of Housing and Local Government	Jeffrey Kitingan	AKAR	Senator	21 August 1994	3 May 1995
Deputy Minister of Foreign Affairs	Abdullah Fadzil Che Wan MP	UMNO	Bukit Gantang	27 October 1990	3 May 1995
Deputy Minister of Human Resources	M. Mahalingam MP	MIC	Kapar	1 December 1993	3 May 1995
Deputy Minister of Domestic Trade and Consumerism	Abdul Kadir Sheikh Fadzir MP	UMNO	Kulim-Bandar Baharu	27 October 1990	3 May 1995
Deputy Minister of Public Enterprises	Siti Zaharah Sulaiman MP	UMNO	Mentakab	27 October 1990	3 May 1995
Deputy Minister of Rural Development	Mohd. Yasin Kamari MP	UMNO	Sri Gading	27 October 1990	3 May 1995
Deputy Minister of Works	Kerk Choo Ting MP	Gerakan	Taiping	27 October 1990	3 May 1995
Deputy Minister of Works	Peter Tinggom Kamarau MP	SNAP	Saratok	27 October 1990	3 May 1995
Deputy Minister of Science, Technology and Environment	Peter Chin Fah Kui MP	SUPP	Miri	27 October 1990	3 May 1995
Deputy Minister of Energy, Telecommunications and Posts	Dato' Tajol Rosli Mohd Ghazali MP	UMNO	Gerik	27 October 1990	3 May 1995
Deputy Minister of Primary Industries	Tengku Mahmud Tengku Mansor MP	UMNO	Setiu	27 October 1990	3 May 1995
Deputy Minister of National Unity and Community Development	Alexander Lee Yu Lung MP	Gerakan	Batu	27 October 1990	3 May 1995
Deputy Minister of Youth and Sports	Teng Gaik Kwan MP	MCA	Raub	27 October 1990	3 May 1995
Deputy Minister of Information	Datuk Railey Jaffery MP	UMNO	Silam	27 October 1990	3 May 1995

== See also ==
- Members of the Dewan Rakyat, 8th Malaysian Parliament
- List of parliamentary secretaries of Malaysia#Fourth Mahathir cabinet
