= Awang Adek Hussin =

Malaysian politician and diplomat

Yang Berbahagia Dato' Seri Awang Adek Hussin SPMP SIMP DGPN DCSM DPMK DJMK DMSM JSM
- اواڠ اديق حسين

Deputy Minister of Finance I
- In office 10 April 2009 – 15 May 2013 Serving with Chor Chee Heung (2009–2010); Donald Lim Siang Chai (2010–2013)
- Monarchs: Mizan Zainal Abidin; Abdul Halim
- Prime Minister: Najib Razak
- Minister: Najib Razak; Ahmad Husni Hanadzlah
- Preceded by: Ahmad Husni Hanadzlah
- Succeeded by: Ahmad Maslan
- Constituency: Senator
- In office 14 February 2006 – 18 March 2008 Serving with Ng Yen Yen
- Monarchs: Sirajuddin; Mizan Zainal Abidin
- Prime Minister: Abdullah Ahmad Badawi
- Minister: Abdullah Ahmad Badawi; Nor Mohamed Yakcop
- Preceded by: Tengku Putera Tengku Awang
- Succeeded by: Ahmad Husni Hanadzlah
- Constituency: Bachok

Deputy Minister of Rural and Regional Development
- In office 27 March 2004 – 14 February 2006 Serving with Tiki Lafe
- Monarch: Sirajuddin
- Prime Minister: Abdullah Ahmad Badawi
- Minister: Abdul Aziz Shamsuddin
- Preceded by: Palanivel Govindasamy
- Succeeded by: Zainal Abdidin Osman
- Constituency: Bachok

14th Malaysian Ambassador to the United States
- In office 31 March 2014 – 28 December 2016
- Monarchs: Abdul Halim; Muhammad V
- Prime Minister: Najib Razak
- Preceded by: Othman Hashim
- Succeeded by: Zulhasnan Rafique

Member of the Malaysian Parliament for Bachok
- In office 21 March 2004 – 8 March 2008
- Preceded by: Wan Nik Wan Yusoff (PAS)
- Succeeded by: Nasharudin Mat Isa (PAS)
- Majority: 1,567 (2004)

Personal details
- Born: Awang Adek bin Hussin; 18 May 1955 (age 71) Bachok, Kelantan, Federation of Malaya (now Malaysia)
- Citizenship: Malaysian
- Party: United Malays National Organisation (UMNO)
- Other political affiliations: Barisan Nasional (BN); Perikatan Nasional (PN); Muafakat Nasional (MN)
- Spouse: Latifah Mohd Yusof
- Children: 5
- Education: Sekolah Tuanku Abdul Rahman; Drew University; Wharton School of the University of Pennsylvania

Awang Adek bin Hussin (born 18 May 1955) is a Malaysian politician and diplomat. He is the former Malaysian Ambassador to the United States. He was the Member of the Parliament of Malaysia for the Bachok constituency in Kelantan for one term from 2004 to 2008. Datuk Dr. Awang Adek bin Hussin is no longer an active politician he once was. He had relinquished all his party positions after the General Election in 2018. He remains active as an ordinary party member and is no longer active in party politics. Since 2018, his involvements focused mainly on corporate activities and has been chairmen on a few boards.

== Early life and education ==
Awang Adek was born in Bachok, Kelantan. Awang Adek holds degrees in mathematics and economics from Drew University of the United States and a Doctor of Philosophy (PhD) and master's degree from Wharton School of the University of Pennsylvania.

== Career ==
He began his career as a lecturer at Universiti Sains Malaysia (USM) from 1983 to 1985.

Later, he joined Bank Negara Malaysia (BNM) from 1985 to 2001 with the last post as assistant governor.

He also served as Chairman Tenaga Nasional Berhad (TNB) besides being loaned to Labuan Offshore Financial Services Authority as the first Director-General for two years beginning in 1996.

== Involvement in politics ==
Awang Adek became active in politics when he was elected as Deputy UMNO leader for Bachok in 2001.

He has also been given the mandate to hold the UMNO Kelantan Treasurer post since 2003. In 2003, he was also appointed as UMNO Sponsor Chairman for Bachok and was unopposed in the election of the division this year.

He stood for the Bachok Parliamentary seat election in 2004, and after winning the seat, he was appointed Deputy Rural and Regional Development Minister until 2006 before he was appointed Deputy Finance Minister until April 2013.

While in the general election of 2008, he competed in two seats for Parliament and state assemblies but was defeated in both seats.

On April 9, 2009, he was appointed senator and was appointed for a second term on April 9, 2012.

Datuk Dr. Awang Adek bin Hussin is no longer an active politician he once was. He had relinquished all his party positions after the General Election in 2018. He remains active as an ordinary party member and is no longer active in party politics. Since 2018, his involvements focused mainly on corporate activities and has been chairmen on a few boards.

=== Cabinet positions ===
- Deputy Rural and Regional Development Minister (2004–2006)
- Deputy Finance Minister (2006–2013)
- Senator (2011-2013)

== Ambassador to the United States 2014-2016 ==
On 31 March 2014, he was appointed the new ambassador to the United States by Yang di-Pertuan Agong Tuanku Abdul Halim Mu'adzam Shah.

== Election results ==
Kelantan State Legislative Assembly
Year	Constituency	Candidate	Votes	Pct	Opponent(s)	Votes	Pct	Ballots cast	Majority	Turnout
2008	N21 Perupok	Awang Adek Hussin (UMNO)	8,235	46.42%	Omar Mohammed (PAS)	9,505	53.58%	18,024	1,270	85.76%

Parliament of Malaysia
Year	Constituency	Candidate	Votes	Pct	Opponent(s)	Votes	Pct	Ballots cast	Majority	Turnout
2004	P025 Bachok	Awang Adek Hussin (UMNO)	23,341	51.74%	Wan Nik Wan Yusoff (PAS)	21,774	48.26%	46,335	1,567	83.76%
2008	P025 Bachok	Awang Adek Hussin (UMNO)	25,934	47.35%	Nasharudin Mat Isa (PAS)	28,835	52.65%	55,724	2,901	85.98%
2013	P025 Bachok	Awang Adek Hussin (UMNO)	35,218	49.86%	Ahmad Marzuk Shaary (PAS)	35,419	50.14%	71,792	201	88.02%
2018	P025 Bachok	Awang Adek Hussin (UMNO)	32,896	44.48%	Nik Mohamad Abduh Nik Abd Aziz (PAS)	36,188	48.93%	75,945	3,292	82.01%
2018	P025 Bachok	Awang Adek Hussin (UMNO)	32,896	44.48%	Zulkifli Zakaria (PPBM)	4,880	6.60%	75,945	3,292	82.01%

== Honours ==
- Malaysia
  - Companion of the Order of Loyalty to the Crown of Malaysia (JSM) (1999)
- Kelantan
  - Knight Commander of the Order of the Crown of Kelantan (DPMK) – Dato' (2006)
  - Knight Commander of the Order of the Life of the Crown of Kelantan (DJMK) – Dato' (2003)
- Malacca
  - Knight Commander of the Exalted Order of Malacca (DCSM) – Datuk Wira (2007)
  - Companion Class I of the Exalted Order of Malacca (DMSM) – Datuk (1999)
- Pahang
  - Knight Grand Companion of the Order of the Crown of Pahang (SIMP) – formerly Dato', now Dato' Indera (2003)
- Perlis
  - Knight Grand Commander of the Order of the Crown of Perlis (SPMP) – Dato' Seri (2022)
- Penang
  - Commander of the Order of the Defender of State (DGPN) – Dato' Seri (2022)

== See also ==
- Perupok (state constituency) (renamed Pantai Irama)
- Bachok (federal constituency)

Political offices
Preceded by Othman Hashim	Malaysian Ambassador to the United States; 2014-2016	Succeeded by Zulhasnan Rafique
