= Fifth Mahathir cabinet =

13th Cabinet of Malaysia

- 13th Cabinet of Malaysia

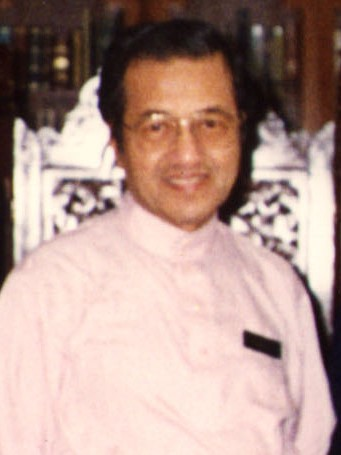
- Date formed: 8 May 1995
- Date dissolved: 14 December 1999

People and organisations
- Head of state: Tuanku Jaafar (1995–1999); Tuanku Salahuddin Abdul Aziz Shah (1999)
- Head of government: Mahathir Mohamad
- Deputy head of government: Anwar Ibrahim (1995–1998); Abdullah Ahmad Badawi (1999)
- Member parties: Barisan Nasional: United Malays National Organisation; Malaysian Chinese Association; United Traditional Bumiputera Party; Malaysian Indian Congress; Malaysian People's Movement Party; Sarawak Native People's Party; Sarawak United Peoples' Party; Sarawak National Party; Liberal Democratic Party; Sabah Progressive Party
- Status in legislature: Coalition government
- Opposition parties: Democratic Action Party; United Sabah Party; Pan-Malaysian Islamic Party; Semangat 46
- Opposition leader: Lim Kit Siang

History
- Election: 1995 Malaysian general election
- Outgoing election: 1999 Malaysian general election
- Legislature term: 9th Malaysian Parliament
- Budgets: 1996, 1997, 1998, 1999, 2000
- Predecessor: Fourth Mahathir cabinet
- Successor: Sixth Mahathir cabinet

Mahathir Mohamad formed the fifth Mahathir cabinet after being invited by Tuanku Jaafar to begin a new government following the 25 April 1995 general election in Malaysia. Prior to the election, Mahathir led (as prime minister) the fourth Mahathir cabinet, a coalition government that consisted of members of the component parties of Barisan Nasional. It was the 13th cabinet of Malaysia formed since independence.

This is a list of the members of the fifth cabinet of the fourth prime minister of Malaysia, Mahathir Mohamad.

== Composition ==
=== Full members ===
The federal cabinet consisted of the following ministers:

| Portfolio | Office bearer | Party | Constituency | Term start | Term end |
|---|---|---|---|---|---|
| Prime Minister | Dato' Seri Dr. Mahathir Mohamad MP | UMNO | Kubang Pasu | 8 May 1995 | 14 December 1999 |
| Deputy Prime Minister | Dato' Seri Anwar Ibrahim MP | UMNO | Permatang Pauh | 8 May 1995 | 2 September 1998 |
| Deputy Prime Minister | Dato' Seri Abdullah Ahmad Badawi MP | UMNO | Kepala Batas | 29 January 1999 | 14 December 1999 |
| Minister in the Prime Minister's Department | Dato' Abdul Hamid Othman MP | UMNO | Sik | 8 May 1995 | 14 December 1999 |
| Minister in the Prime Minister's Department | Dato Sri Abang Abu Bakar Abang Mustapha MP | PBB | Kuala Rajang | 8 May 1995 | 7 January 1999 |
| Minister in the Prime Minister's Department | Datuk Chong Kah Kiat | LDP | Senator | 8 May 1995 | 12 November 1996 |
| Minister in the Prime Minister's Department | Dato' Siti Zaharah Sulaiman MP | UMNO | Paya Besar | 12 November 1996 | 14 December 1999 |
| Minister in the Prime Minister's Department | Dato' Seri Tajol Rosli Mohd Ghazali MP | UMNO | Gerik | 7 January 1999 | 14 December 1999 |
| Minister with Special Functions | Tun Daim Zainuddin MP | UMNO | Merbok | 7 January 1999 | 14 December 1999 |
| Minister of Finance | Dato' Seri Anwar Ibrahim MP | UMNO | Permatang Pauh | 8 May 1995 | 2 September 1998 |
| Minister of Finance | Dato' Seri Dr. Mahathir Mohamad MP | UMNO | Kubang Pasu | 2 September 1998 | 7 January 1999 |
| Minister of Finance | Dato' Mustapa Mohamed MP | UMNO | Jeli | 2 September 1998 | 14 December 1999 |
| Minister of Finance | Tun Daim Zainuddin MP | UMNO | Merbok | 7 January 1999 | 14 December 1999 |
| Minister of Defence | Dato' Syed Hamid Albar MP | UMNO | Kota Tinggi | 8 May 1995 | 7 January 1999 |
| Minister of Defence | Dato Sri Abang Abu Bakar Abang Mustapha MP | PBB | Kuala Rajang | 7 January 1999 | 14 December 1999 |
| Minister of Home Affairs | Dato' Seri Dr. Mahathir Mohamad MP | UMNO | Kubang Pasu | 8 May 1995 | 7 January 1999 |
| Minister of Home Affairs | Dato' Seri Abdullah Ahmad Badawi MP | UMNO | Kepala Batas | 7 January 1999 | 14 December 1999 |
| Minister of International Trade and Industry | Dato' Seri Rafidah Aziz MP | UMNO | Kuala Kangsar | 8 May 1995 | 14 December 1999 |
| Minister of Education | Dato' Sri Mohd. Najib Abdul Razak MP | UMNO | Pekan | 8 May 1995 | 14 December 1999 |
| Minister of Lands and Co-operatives Development | Datuk Seri Panglima Osu Sukam MP | UMNO | Papar | 8 May 1995 | 14 March 1999 |
| Minister of Lands and Co-operatives Development | Tan Sri Datuk Kasitah Gaddam | UMNO | Senator | 14 March 1999 | 14 December 1999 |
| Minister of Transport | Dato' Seri Ling Liong Sik MP | MCA | Labis | 8 May 1995 | 14 December 1999 |
| Minister of Agriculture | Datuk Amar Sulaiman Daud MP | PBB | Petra Jaya | 8 May 1995 | 14 December 1999 |
| Minister of Health | Dato' Chua Jui Meng MP | MCA | Bakri | 8 May 1995 | 14 December 1999 |
| Minister of Culture, Arts and Tourism | Dato' Sri Sabbaruddin Chik MP | UMNO | Temerloh | 8 May 1995 | 12 November 1996 |
| Minister of Culture, Arts and Tourism | Dato' Abdul Kadir Sheikh Fadzir MP | UMNO | Kulim-Bandar Baharu | 12 November 1996 | 14 December 1999 |
| Minister of Housing and Local Government | Dato' Ting Chew Peh MP | MCA | Gopeng | 8 May 1995 | 14 December 1999 |
| Minister of Foreign Affairs | Dato' Seri Abdullah Ahmad Badawi MP | UMNO | Kepala Batas | 8 May 1995 | 7 January 1999 |
| Minister of Foreign Affairs | Dato' Syed Hamid Albar MP | UMNO | Kota Tinggi | 7 January 1999 | 14 December 1999 |
| Minister of Human Resources | Dato' Lim Ah Lek MP | MCA | Bentong | 8 May 1995 | 14 December 1999 |
| Minister of Domestic Trade and Consumerism | Dato' Seri Abu Hassan Omar MP | UMNO | Kuala Selangor | 8 May 1995 | 1 May 1997 |
| Minister of Domestic Trade and Consumerism | Dato' Seri Megat Junid Megat Ayub MP | UMNO | Pasir Salak | 2 May 1997 | 14 December 1999 |
| Minister of Entrepreneur Development | Dato' Mustapa Mohamed MP | UMNO | Jeli | 8 May 1995 | 14 December 1999 |
| Minister of Rural Development | Dato' Annuar Musa MP | UMNO | Peringat | 8 May 1995 | 14 December 1999 |
| Minister of Works | Dato' Seri Samy Vellu MP | MIC | Sungai Siput | 8 May 1995 | 14 December 1999 |
| Minister of Science, Technology and Environment | Dato Sri Law Hieng Ding MP | SUPP | Sarikei | 8 May 1995 | 14 December 1999 |
| Minister of Energy, Communications and Multimedia | Datuk Amar Leo Moggie Irok MP | PBDS | Kanowit | 8 May 1995 | 14 December 1999 |
| Minister for Primary Industries | Dato' Seri Dr. Lim Keng Yaik MP | Gerakan | Beruas | 8 May 1995 | 14 December 1999 |
| Minister of National Unity and Community Development | Datin Paduka Zaleha Ismail MP | UMNO | Gombak | 8 May 1995 | 14 December 1999 |
| Minister of Youth and Sports | Tan Sri Dato' Haji Muhyiddin Mohd. Yassin MP | UMNO | Pagoh | 8 May 1995 | 14 December 1999 |
| Minister of Information | Dato' Mohamed Rahmat MP | UMNO | Pulai | 8 May 1995 | 14 December 1999 |

=== Deputy ministers ===
| Portfolio | Office bearer | Party | Constituency | Term start | Term end |
|---|---|---|---|---|---|
| Deputy Minister in the Prime Minister's Department | Datuk Mohamed Nazri Abdul Aziz MP | UMNO | Chenderoh | 8 May 1995 | 12 November 1996 |
| Deputy Minister in the Prime Minister's Department | Raja Ariffin Raja Sulaiman MP | UMNO | Baling | 8 May 1995 | 12 November 1996 |
| Deputy Minister in the Prime Minister's Department | Dato' Ibrahim Saad MP | UMNO | Tasek Gelugor | 8 May 1995 | 12 November 1996 |
| Deputy Minister in the Prime Minister's Department | Dato' Ibrahim Ali | UMNO | Senator | 12 November 1996 | 14 December 1999 |
| Deputy Minister in the Prime Minister's Department | Dato' Fauzi Abdul Rahman MP | UMNO | Kuantan | 12 November 1996 | 14 December 1999 |
| Deputy Minister of Finance | Affifudin Omar MP | UMNO | Padang Terap | 8 May 1995 | 12 November 1996 |
| Deputy Minister of Finance | Wong See Wah MP | MCA | Rasah | 8 May 1995 | 14 December 1999 |
| Deputy Minister of Finance | Datuk Mohamed Nazri Abdul Aziz MP | UMNO | Chenderoh | 12 November 1996 | 14 December 1999 |
| Deputy Minister of Defence | Abdullah Fadzil Che Wan MP | UMNO | Bukit Gantang | 8 May 1995 | 14 December 1999 |
| Deputy Minister of Home Affairs | Dato' Seri Megat Junid Megat Ayub MP | UMNO | Pasir Salak | 8 May 1995 | 2 July 1997 |
| Deputy Minister of Home Affairs | Dato' Ong Ka Ting MP | MCA | Pontian | 8 May 1995 | 14 December 1999 |
| Deputy Minister of Home Affairs | Dato' Azmi Khalid MP | UMNO | Padang Besar | 2 July 1997 | 14 December 1999 |
| Deputy Minister of International Trade and Industry | Dato' Kerk Choo Ting MP | Gerakan | Taiping | 8 May 1995 | 14 December 1999 |
| Deputy Minister of Education | Dato' Mohd. Khalid Mohd. Yunos MP | UMNO | Jempol | 8 May 1995 | 14 December 1999 |
| Deputy Minister of Education | Datuk Fong Chan Onn MP | MCA | Selandar | 8 May 1995 | 14 December 1999 |
| Deputy Minister of Lands and Co-operatives Development | Goh Cheng Teik MP | Gerakan | Nibong Tebal | 8 May 1995 | 14 December 1999 |
| Deputy Minister of Transport | Datuk Wira Mohd Ali Rustam MP | UMNO | Batu Berendam | 8 May 1995 | 12 November 1996 |
| Deputy Minister of Transport | Dato' Ibrahim Saad MP | UMNO | Tasek Gelugor | 12 November 1996 | 14 December 1999 |
| Deputy Minister of Agriculture | Tengku Mahmud Tengku Mansor MP | UMNO | Setiu | 8 May 1995 | 14 December 1999 |
| Deputy Minister of Health | Dato' Siti Zaharah Sulaiman MP | UMNO | Paya Besar | 8 May 1995 | 12 November 1996 |
| Deputy Minister of Health | Datuk Wira Mohd Ali Rustam MP | UMNO | Batu Berendam | 12 November 1996 | 14 December 1999 |
| Deputy Minister of Culture, Arts and Tourism | Teng Gaik Kwan MP | MCA | Raub | 8 May 1995 | 14 December 1999 |
| Deputy Minister of Housing and Local Government | Dato' Tajol Rosli Mohd Ghazali MP | UMNO | Gerik | 8 May 1995 | 7 January 1999 |
| Deputy Minister of Housing and Local Government | Datuk Peter Chin Fah Kui MP | SUPP | Miri | 8 May 1995 | 14 December 1999 |
| Deputy Minister of Housing and Local Government | Datuk Mohd Shafie Apdal MP | UMNO | Semporna | 7 January 1999 | 14 December 1999 |
| Deputy Minister of Foreign Affairs | Datuk Leo Michael Toyad MP | PBB | Mukah | 8 May 1995 | 14 December 1999 |
| Deputy Minister of Human Resources | Dato' Abdul Kadir Sheikh Fadzir MP | UMNO | Kulim-Bandar Baharu | 8 May 1995 | 12 November 1996 |
| Deputy Minister of Human Resources | Affifudin Omar MP | UMNO | Padang Terap | 12 November 1996 | 14 December 1999 |
| Deputy Minister of Domestic Trade and Consumerism | Dato' Subramaniam Sinniah MP | MIC | Segamat | 8 May 1995 | 14 December 1999 |
| Deputy Minister of Entrepreneur Development | Idris Jusoh MP | UMNO | Besut | 8 May 1995 | 14 December 1999 |
| Deputy Minister of Rural Development | K.Kumaran MP | MIC | Tapah | 8 May 1995 | 14 December 1999 |
| Deputy Minister of Works | Datuk Railey Jaffrey MP | UMNO | Silam | 8 May 1995 | 14 December 1999 |
| Deputy Minister of Science, Technology and Environment | Abu Bakar Daud MP | UMNO | Kuala Terengganu | 8 May 1995 | 14 December 1999 |
| Deputy Minister of Energy, Communications and Multimedia | Dato' Chan Kong Choy MP | MCA | Selayang | 8 May 1995 | 14 December 1999 |
| Deputy Minister of Primary Industries | Siti Zainaboon Abu Bakar MP | UMNO | Tebrau | 8 May 1995 | 12 November 1996 |
| Deputy Minister of Primary Industries | Dato' Hishammuddin Hussein MP | UMNO | Tenggara | 12 November 1996 | 14 December 1999 |
| Deputy Minister of National Unity and Community Development | Peter Tinggom Kamarau MP | SNAP | Saratok | 8 May 1995 | 14 December 1999 |
| Deputy Minister of Youth and Sports | Dato' Loke Yuen Yow MP | MCA | Tanjong Malim | 8 May 1995 | 14 December 1999 |
| Deputy Minister of Information | Suleiman Mohamed MP | UMNO | Titiwangsa | 8 May 1995 | 14 December 1999 |

== See also ==
- Members of the Dewan Rakyat, 9th Malaysian Parliament
- List of parliamentary secretaries of Malaysia § Fifth Mahathir cabinet
