= Ng Yen Yen =

Malaysian politician

Yang Berbahagia Tan Sri Dato' Sri Ng Yen Yen PSM SSAP DGSM DPMK DSAP DIMP DPMP JP
- 黄燕燕

Minister of Tourism
- In office 16 April 2009 – 15 May 2013
- Monarchs: Mizan Zainal Abidin; Abdul Halim
- Prime Minister: Najib Razak
- Deputy: Sulaiman Abdul Rahman Taib (2009); James Dawos Mamit (2009–2013)
- Preceded by: Azalina Othman Said
- Succeeded by: Mohamed Nazri Abdul Aziz as Minister of Tourism and Culture
- Constituency: Raub

Minister of Women, Family and Community Development
- In office 19 March 2008 – 9 April 2009
- Monarch: Mizan Zainal Abidin
- Prime Minister: Abdullah Ahmad Badawi
- Deputy: Noriah Kasnon
- Preceded by: Shahrizat Abdul Jalil
- Succeeded by: Shahrizat Abdul Jalil
- Constituency: Raub

Deputy Minister of Finance II
- In office 1 July 2003 – 18 March 2008 Serving with Shafie Salleh (2003–2004); Tengku Putera Tengku Awang (2004–2006); Awang Adek Hussin (2006–2008)
- Monarchs: Sirajuddin; Mizan Zainal Abidin
- Prime Minister: Mahathir Mohamad; Abdullah Ahmad Badawi
- Minister: Mahathir Mohamad (2003); Jamaluddin Jarjis (2002–2004); Abdullah Ahmad Badawi (2003–2008); Nor Mohamed Yakcop (2004–2008)
- Preceded by: Chan Kong Choy
- Succeeded by: Kong Cho Ha
- Constituency: Raub

Vice-President of Malaysian Chinese Association
- In office 18 October 2008 – 21 December 2013 Serving with Kong Cho Ha (2008–2010); Liow Tiong Lai (2008–2010); Tan Kok Hong (2008–2010); Donald Lim Siang Chai (2010–2013); Chor Chee Heung (2010–2013); Gan Ping Sieu (2010–2013)
- President: Ong Tee Keat; Chua Soi Lek
- Deputy: Chua Soi Lek; Liow Tiong Lai
- Preceded by: Ong Tee Keat
- Succeeded by: Lee Chee Leong
- Constituency: Raub

Member of the Malaysian Parliament for Raub
- In office 29 November 1999 – 5 May 2013
- Preceded by: Teng Gaik Kwan (MCA–BN)
- Succeeded by: Mohd Ariff Sabri Abdul Aziz (DAP)
- Majority: 5,864 (1999); 9,752 (2004); 2,752 (2008)

Personal details
- Born: Oei Yang Yang @ Ng Yen Yen; 10 April 1946 (age 80) Kota Bharu, Kelantan, Malayan Union (now Malaysia)
- Citizenship: Malaysian
- Party: Malaysian Chinese Association (MCA)
- Other political affiliations: Barisan Nasional (BN); Perikatan Nasional (PN)
- Spouse: Chin Chee Sue
- Children: 3
- Education: University of Malaya; Johns Hopkins University
- Occupation: Politician
- Profession: Medical doctor
- Website: www.drngyenyen.com

Ng Yen Yen (Chinese: 黄燕燕; pinyin: Huáng Yàn Yàn; Pe̍h-ōe-jī: N̂g Iàn-iàn; born 10 April 1946) is a Malaysian politician who had served in the Cabinet of Malaysia as Minister of Women, Family and Community Development from 2008 to 2009 and Minister of Tourism from 2009 to 2013. Her appointment as a full minister marked a milestone as the first Malaysian Chinese woman to hold a cabinet position.

Ng was the first woman to be elected to the position of Vice-President of Malaysian Chinese Association (MCA) from 2008 to 2013. Earlier she was the chief of the Women's wing of the MCA until 2008.

== Early life ==
Ng is a Kelantan native who was born in Kampung Kubang Pasu, Kota Bharu. As a teenager, she had to give tuition to finance her Form Six education at the Victoria Institution in Kuala Lumpur.

Her father, who was old-fashioned, wanted to marry her off when she was 17 years old. However, her mother stepped in and made sure Ng completed her education to highest level she aspired.

Ng obtained a scholarship from the State Government of Kelantan and then graduated from Universiti Malaya in 1972 with a Bachelor of Medicine, Bachelor of Surgery (MBBS). She was also awarded a Diploma of Reproductive Medicine from the Johns Hopkins University in the United States.

She was awarded an honorary doctorate by Josai International University (ranked 252nd in Japan) on 4 September 2012 for her "significant contributions in tourism industry development, nation building and forging of closer relations and cooperation between the university and Malaysia".

== Family ==
Dr. Ng is married to Dr. Cheang Chee Sue and has three children.

== Political involvement ==
Dr. Ng, was Kelantan Wanita MCA chairman and the national MCA vice-president, the first woman to be elected to the post. She was a former Deputy Culture, Arts and Tourism Minister, and Deputy Finance Minister (2003 and 2008).

== Member of Parliament ==
She was first elected as Member of Parliament of the constituency of Raub in 1999. She retained her parliamentary seat in the 2004 and 2008 elections. She was not renominated as the candidate for the parliamentary seat in the 2013 elections.

Bukit Koman, an area under the Raub parliamentary constituency of which Ng is the member of, is notorious for its gold mining activity. Villagers of Kampung Bukit Koman have been facing health and environment problems after a gold mine operator started using cyanide in the extraction method.

During the 2008 elections, Ng who was seeking her third term as MP for Raub, said she saw the gold mining project in Bukit Koman as a way of developing Raub into a tourist town and generating other economic activities much like the Australian city of Ballarat, where its legacy of wealth from the 19th century gold rush is still visible today.

"If the mine is not safe, I will be the first one to ask for its closure," the Wanita MCA chief stressed.

However, when villages approached Ng three months after the election, she has been reported to say that there is no cause for concern for the villagers of Bukit Koman, saying that she had already looked into the matter three years ago. At least 300 villagers, including the elderly and children, have complained of suffering from different medical symptoms due to cyanide. Ng has been criticised for her care-less attitude towards the villagers.

== Senatorship ==
Before being elected as a member of parliament in Dewan Rakyat, she was a senator in the Dewan Negara. She was recommended to be a senator by the then MCA deputy president Lim Ah Lek. Her senatorship was from the Pahang state government under MCA's quota and her candidacy had to be endorsed by the Pahang State Executive Council and Legislative Assembly. Ng took her oath of office as a senator in August 1993.

Ng's senatorship was scrutinised and it was found that she was a permanent resident of Australia when she took the oath of loyalty to the Yang di-Pertuan Agong and country to be appointed a senator. Before receiving her senatorship she had declared herself as a permanent resident of Australia in documents filed with the Australian authorities. She was still an Australian PR in between 1990 and 1995 during her tenure as a Malaysian Senator. Ng chose Tusmore, Adelaide, South Australia as her place of residence and had been living in Australia for approximately three years.

In Australia, Ng teamed up with Soh Chee Wen, General (Rtd) Mohamed Ngah Said and two Australians to run stock-broking business via New South Wales-based company, Indo Pacific Securities Limited, from April 1992 through May 1995. She was a director of the company from April 1992 until she resigned in May 1995. In an interview to Malaysiakini, Ng said she revoked her permanent residency in 1995, in her second year of senatorship, as she need not travel to Australia that frequently any more. Thus, she said the question of her 'dual citizenship' does not hold any more.

Ng has said that she obtained the PR status to facilitate her frequent travelling to Australia to look after her three sons who "were in their early formative years and studying there".

Lim Ah Lek, the person who had recommended Ng for the senatorship, has said that he was misled and regretted his decision, saying:

"Recommending someone who holds a PR in a foreign country for a senatorship brings disrepute to the Senate, and in this case, also to the Pahang exco and to the Legislative Assembly. I am shocked to learn about what was reported... I need to clarify this as my reputation is at stake,"

Rais Yatim, the then de facto Law Minister of Malaysia, commended that Dr Ng Yen Yen's past status as an Australian permanent resident while serving as senator was "morally untenable" though it is not legally wrong.

== Ministerial positions ==
=== Minister of Women, Family and Community Development ===
Dr. Ng is the first Malaysian Chinese woman to hold a cabinet position and only the second minister in charge of the Ministry of Women, Family and Community Development. She said her new job was more than handling women issues as it invariably also included men, children and the community.

She said she intended to have more participation from Malaysian men because they "made up the equation" where it would lead to strong families being formed and subsequently a better nation.

Among her initial plans are to educate the community on gender equality, beginning at school level; create a gender-friendly environment for working women; improve community development by working closely with the relevant non-governmental organisations; and also addressing issues faced by elderly women. Dr. Ng said she would meet with her predecessor Datuk Seri Shahrizat Abdul Jalil to seek her advice.

=== Minister of Tourism ===
On 9 April 2009, she was appointed Minister of Tourism in Prime Minister Datuk Seri Najib Tun Razak's new cabinet. Under her stewardship, Malaysia was rated the ninth most popular tourist destination by United Nations World Tourism Organization (UNWTO). In 2011, Malaysia received 24.8 million tourists, generating RM58.3 billion in tourism receipts. The ministry also spent RM 1.8 million on a Facebook marketing campaign to promote tourism.

One of her first few concerns as Tourism Minister was to promote the Homestay programme whereby tourists will get to stay in villages and experience the true essence of Malaysia's rural lifestyle. Her approach increased the numbers and earned the Ministry of Tourism Malaysia the coveted UNWTO Ulysses Award for Innovation in Public Policy and Governance for the Malaysia Homestay Experience Programme on 15 Nov 2012.

To keep tourist numbers rolling in, she launched new programmes and events, specifically targeting different segments of the tourism market. As a natural extension of the successful "Malaysia Truly Asia" brand, she launched the "Fabulous Food 1 Malaysia" event, a 3-month promotion campaign (Oct to Dec) highlighting Malaysia's gourmet, restaurants and street food. Malaysians generally are proud of their wide variety of food choices, the result of their multi-ethnic and multi-cultural heritage.

Other new programmes aimed at increasing the tourism receipts are the Malaysian International Shoe Festival (MISF), and the Malaysian Contemporary Arts Tourism Festival. Banking on Malaysia's shoe designer, Jimmy Choo, the Malaysian International Shoe Festival is fast gaining recognition for Malaysia as the Shoe Capital of the East.

The Malaysian Contemporary Art Tourism Festival (Jul–Sept) gave spark of life to the local art scene. With the Ministry's focus on contemporary art promotion, the interest, awareness and appreciation for art is growing steadily. The ultimate objective is to attract foreign tourists to invest in Malaysia's contemporary art. CNN rated Kuala Lumpur as the fourth most popular shopping destination in the world after New York, Tokyo and London.

==== Gastronationalist controversy ====
In 2009, as part of a national food branding exercise, Ng attempted to claim exclusivity and national ownership for regional dishes such as Laksa, Hainanese Chicken Rice and Bak Kut Teh, claiming that others have "hijacked their dishes". This led to discontent with its regional neighbours, particularity in countries such as Indonesia, Singapore and Thailand. Ng later clarified that she was misquoted on her intention to patent the foods, and that a study on the origins of the foods would be conducted "and an apology conveyed if it was wrongly claimed." No such study ever occurred.

== Election results ==
Parliament of Malaysia
Year	Constituency	Candidate	Votes	Pct	Opponent(s)	Votes	Pct	Ballots cast	Majority	Turnout
1999	P076 Raub	Ng Yen Yen (MCA)	20,457	58.37%	Ng Kwi Ling (DAP)	14,593	41.63%	36,606	5,864	69.87%
2004	P080 Raub	Ng Yen Yen (MCA)	20,457	65.63%	Choong Siew Onn (DAP)	10,720	34.37%	32,546	9,752	73.07%
2008	P080 Raub	Ng Yen Yen (MCA)	18,078	54.12%	Abu Bakar Lebai Sudin (DAP)	15,326	45.88%	34,459	2,752	74.18%

== Honours ==
- Malaysia
  - Commander of the Order of Loyalty to the Crown of Malaysia (PSM) – Tan Sri (2014)
- Kedah
  - Justice of the Peace of Kedah (JP) (2014)
- Kelantan
  - Knight Commander of the Order of the Crown of Kelantan (DPMK) – Dato' (2004)
- Malacca
  - Grand Commander of the Exalted Order of Malacca (DGSM) – Datuk Seri (2010)
- Pahang
  - Grand Knight of the Order of Sultan Ahmad Shah of Pahang (SSAP) – Dato' Sri (2008)
  - Knight Companion of the Order of Sultan Ahmad Shah of Pahang (DSAP) – Dato' (2003)
  - Knight Companion of the Order of the Crown of Pahang (DIMP) – Dato' (1997)
- Perlis
  - Knight Commander of the Order of the Crown of Perlis (DPMP) – Dato' (2003)

Political offices
Preceded by Shahrizat Abdul Jalil	Malaysian Minister of Women, Family and Community Development; 18 March 2008 – 9 April 2009	Succeeded by Shahrizat Abdul Jalil
Preceded by Azalina Othman Said	Tourism Minister of Malaysia; 10 April 2009 – 5 May 2013	Succeeded by Mohamed Nazri Abdul Aziz
