= Lim Hui Ying =

Malaysian politician

Yang Berhormat Puan Lim Hui Ying MP
- 林慧英
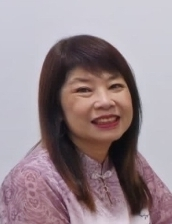
- Lim Hui Ying in 2025

Deputy Minister of Women, Family and Community Development
- Incumbent
- Assumed office 17 December 2025
- Monarchs: Ibrahim Iskandar
- Prime Minister: Anwar Ibrahim
- Minister: Nancy Shukri
- Preceded by: Noraini Ahmad
- Constituency: Tanjong

Deputy Minister of Finance
- In office 12 December 2023 – 16 December 2025
- Monarchs: Abdullah (2023-2024); Ibrahim Iskandar (since 2024)
- Prime Minister: Anwar Ibrahim
- Minister: Anwar Ibrahim (Minister of Finance); Amir Hamzah Azizan (Minister of Finance II)
- Preceded by: Ahmad Maslan (Deputy Minister of Finance I); Steven Sim Chee Keong (Deputy Minister of Finance II)
- Succeeded by: Liew Chin Tong
- Constituency: Tanjong

Deputy Minister of Education
- In office 10 December 2022 – 12 December 2023
- Monarch: Abdullah
- Prime Minister: Anwar Ibrahim
- Minister: Fadhlina Sidek
- Preceded by: Mah Hang Soon (Deputy Minister of Education I); Mohamad Alamin (Deputy Minister of Education II)
- Succeeded by: Wong Kah Woh
- Constituency: Tanjong

Member of the Malaysian Parliament for Tanjong
- Incumbent
- Assumed office 19 November 2022
- Preceded by: Chow Kon Yeow (PH–DAP)
- Majority: 28,754 (2022)

Senator Elected by the Penang State Legislative Assembly
- In office 27 August 2018 – 5 November 2022 Serving with Yusmadi Yusoff (2018–2021); Fadhlina Sidek (2021–2022)
- Monarchs: Muhammad V (2018–2019); Abdullah (2019–2022)
- Prime Minister: Mahathir Mohamad (2018–2020); Muhyiddin Yassin (2020–2021); Ismail Sabri Yaakob (2021–2022)

Personal details
- Born: Lim Hui Ying; 24 June 1963 (age 63) Singapore
- Party: Democratic Action Party (DAP)
- Other political affiliations: Pakatan Harapan (PH)
- Spouse: Tan Khong Chong
- Relations: Lim Guan Eng (elder brother)
- Parent(s): Lim Kit Siang (father); Neo Yoke Tee (mother)
- Education: University of Malaya (Bachelor of Arts)
- Occupation: Politician

Lim Hui Ying (Chinese: 林慧英; Pe̍h-ōe-jī: Lîm Hūi-eng; born 1963) is a Malaysian politician who is serving as the Deputy Minister of Women, Family and Community Development in the Unity Government administration under Prime Minister Anwar Ibrahim since December 2025 and the Member of Parliament (MP) for Tanjong since November 2022. Previously, she served as the Deputy Minister of Finance along with Minister II Amir Hamzah Azizan from December 2023 until December 2025. She served as the Deputy Minister of Education in the PH administration under Prime Minister Anwar and Minister Fadhlina Sidek from December 2022 to December 2023. She served as a Senator from August 2018 to her resignation in November 2022. She is a member and State Secretary of Penang of the Democratic Action Party (DAP), a component party of the PH coalition. She is the daughter of DAP veteran Lim Kit Siang and younger sister of Bagan MP Lim Guan Eng.

== Political career ==
In the 15th General Election, Lim contested for the first-time and won the Tanjong parliamentary seat under the Pakatan Harapan ticket.

She was then appointed to serve as the Deputy Minister of Education, along with Fadhlina Sidek as the Minister of Education, on 9 December 2022. On 12 December 2023, she was moved and appointed to the post of Deputy Minister of Finance during a cabinet reshuffle. She served on that role for two years until 16 December 2025, where in another cabinet reshuffle she was assigned to the post of Deputy Minister of Women, Family and Community Development, and Liew Chin Tong succeeded her as the new Deputy Minister of Finance.

== Controversy ==
On 27 March 2023, Deputy Speaker of the Dewan Rakyat Ramli Mohd Nor reprimanded Lim over the failure of not preparing an answer for the oral question-and-answer session. Earlier, Ahmad Marzuk Shaary (PN-Pengkalan Chepa) had asked about the education ministry's plans to ensure students received nutritious meals in school. However, Lim told the Dewan Rakyat that she had not prepared an answer, and asked to submit a written reply. She said:

May I answer it through a written reply?

— Lim Hui Ying

An MP from Perikatan Nasional urged Lim to resign for failing to prepare an answer during the oral question-and-answer session in the Dewan Rakyat. Meanwhile, MCA Youth secretary-general Daniel Wa Wai How said Lim's salary should be docked by RM10, citing past DAP calls for the same type of punishment against ministers. Shortly after the incident, her special aide issued an apology, saying that the situation was “out of the ordinary”.

== Election results ==
Parliament of Malaysia
Year	Constituency	Candidate	Votes	Pct	Opponent(s)	Votes	Pct	Ballots cast	Majority	Turnout
2022	P049 Tanjong	Lim Hui Ying (DAP)	31,968	84.83%	Tan Kim Nee (MCA)	3,214	8.53%	37,683	28,754	71.34%
2022	P049 Tanjong	Lim Hui Ying (DAP)	31,968	84.83%	H'ng Khoon Leng (Gerakan)	2,501	6.64%	37,683	28,754	71.34%

== Honours ==
=== Honours of Malaysia ===
- Malaysia
  - Recipient of the 17th Yang di-Pertuan Agong Installation Medal (2024)

== See also ==
- List of people who have served in both Houses of the Malaysian Parliament
