= Tambun (federal constituency) =

Federal constituency in Perak, Malaysia

Tambun (P063)
Perak constituency

Federal constituency
- Legislature: Dewan Rakyat
- MP: Anwar Ibrahim; PH
- Constituency created: 1984
- First contested: 1986
- Last contested: 2022

Demographics
- Population (2020): 259,166
- Electors (2022): 160,558
- Area (km²): 535
- Pop. density (per km²): 484.4

Tambun is a federal constituency in Kinta District, Perak, Malaysia, that has been represented in the Dewan Rakyat since 1986.

The federal constituency was created in the 1984 redistribution and is mandated to return a single member to the Dewan Rakyat under the first past the post voting system.

== Demographics ==
Ethnic breakdown of Tambun's electorate as of 2022
1. Malay (64.7%)
2. Chinese (20.5%)
3. Indian (12.4%)
4. Other ethnicities (2.40%)

As of 2020, Tambun has a population of 259,166 people.

Age breakdown of Tambun's electorate as of 2022
1. 18–20 (6.90%)
2. 21–29 (23.2%)
3. 30–39 (22.7%)
4. 40–49 (16.8%)
5. 50–59 (13.6%)
6. 60–69 (10.5%)
7. 70–79 (4.71%)
8. 80–89 (1.30%)
9. above 90 (0.22%)
Gender breakdown of Tambun's electorate as of 2022
1. Male (49.5%)
2. Female (50.5%)

== History ==
=== Polling districts ===
According to the gazette issued on 31 October 2022, the Tambun constituency has a total of 37 polling districts.

State constituency	Polling District	Code	Location
Manjoi（N23）	Pekan Chemor	063/23/01	SMK Amiunddin Baki
Manjoi（N23）	Chemor Indah	063/23/02	SK Haji Mahmud
Manjoi（N23）	Kuala Kuang	063/23/03	SJK (C) Kuala Kuang; SJK (C) Pei Cheng
Manjoi（N23）	Kelabang	063/23/04	SJK (T) Klebang; SJK (C) Poi Lam
Manjoi（N23）	Kampong Chepor Dalam	063/23/05	SK Seri Kelebang; SK Tasik Damai
Manjoi（N23）	Kampong Ulu Chepor	063/23/06	SK Chepor
Manjoi（N23）	Meru Raya	063/23/07	SK Meru Raya
Manjoi（N23）	Meru	063/23/08	SK Jelapang; SRA Rakyat Al-Muttaqin
Manjoi（N23）	Taman Jati	063/23/09	SK Jati; SMK Jati
Manjoi（N23）	Kampong Sungai Kati	063/23/10	SMK Raja Permaisuri Bainun; SA Bantuan Kerajaan Maahad Al-Imam As-Syafiee
Manjoi（N23）	Kampong Datok Ahmad Said; Tambahan 2 Selatan	063/23/11	SK Dato' Ahmad Said Tambahan
Manjoi（N23）	Kampong Datok Ahmad Said; Tambahan 2 Tengah	063/23/12	SK Dato' Ahmad Said Tambahan
Manjoi（N23）	Tun Terang	063/23/13	SA Rakyat Taufikiah Islamiah
Manjoi（N23）	Kampong Sungai Tapah	063/23/14	SK Manjoi (Dua)
Manjoi（N23）	Kampong Seberang Manjoi	063/23/15	SK Manjoi (Satu)
Manjoi（N23）	Kampong Tengku Hussein	063/23/16	SA Rakyat Ittihadiah
Manjoi（N23）	Taman Keledang Jaya	063/23/17	SRA Rakyat Osmaniah
Manjoi（N23）	Germuda	063/23/18	SRA Rakyat Osmaniah
Hulu Kinta（N24）	Kanthan	063/24/01	SJK (C) Chong Hwa
Hulu Kinta（N24）	Kuang	063/24/02	SK Syed Idrus
Hulu Kinta（N24）	Kampong Ulu Chemor	063/24/03	SK Tanah Hitam
Hulu Kinta（N24）	Kampong Chik Zainal	063/24/04	SK Tanah Hitam
Hulu Kinta（N24）	Tanah Hitam	063/24/05	SJK (C) Tanah Hitam
Hulu Kinta（N24）	Changkat Kinding	063/24/06	SJK (T) Ladang Changkat Kinding
Hulu Kinta（N24）	Hospital Bahagia	063/24/07	SK Methodist
Hulu Kinta（N24）	Tanjong Rambutan	063/24/08	SK Seri Tanjung
Hulu Kinta（N24）	Tanjong Rambutan Utara	063/24/09	SJK (T) Tanjong Rambutan
Hulu Kinta（N24）	Tanjong Rambutan Barat	063/24/10	SK Tanjong Rambutan; SA Rakyat Al-Hamidiah
Hulu Kinta（N24）	Kawasan Polis Hutan	063/24/11	SK Pasukan Polis Hutan
Hulu Kinta（N24）	Kampung Tersusun Batu 8	063/24/12	SRA Rakyat Asy Shukuriah
Hulu Kinta（N24）	Bandar Baru Putra	063/24/13	SK Bandar Baru Putera; SMK Bandar Baru Putera
Hulu Kinta（N24）	Pakatan Jaya	063/24/14	SK Pakatan Jaya
Hulu Kinta（N24）	Taman Perpaduan	063/24/15	SK Perpaduan
Hulu Kinta（N24）	Bandar Baru Sunway	063/24/16	SA Rakyat Nurul Hidayah
Hulu Kinta（N24）	Kampong Tersusun Batu 5	063/24/17	SMK Tambun; SRA Rakyat Nurul Hidayah
Hulu Kinta（N24）	Tambun	063/24/18	SK Tambun; SA Rakyat Al-Ihtidaiyah
Hulu Kinta（N24）	Jalan Tambun	063/24/19	SJK (C) Hing Hwa

=== Representation history ===
Members of Parliament for Tambun
Parliament	No	Years	Member	Party	Vote Share
Constituency created from Kinta
7th	P057	1986–1990	Yahaya Mohd. Shafie (يحي محمد. شافعي)	BN (UMNO)	24,342; 71.53%
8th	P057	1990–1995	Nawawi Mat Awin (نووي مت اوين)	BN (UMNO)	29,176; 63.08%
9th	P060	1995–1999	Ahmad Husni Hanadzlah (أحمد حسني حنظلة)	BN (UMNO)	33,224; 83.46%
10th	P060	1999–2004	Ahmad Husni Hanadzlah (أحمد حسني حنظلة)	BN (UMNO)	24,595; 58.41%
11th	P063	2004–2008	Ahmad Husni Hanadzlah (أحمد حسني حنظلة)	BN (UMNO)	31,824; 68.75%
12th	P063	2008–2013	Ahmad Husni Hanadzlah (أحمد حسني حنظلة)	BN (UMNO)	27,942; 55.33%
13th	P063	2013–2018	Ahmad Husni Hanadzlah (أحمد حسني حنظلة)	BN (UMNO)	42,093; 56.23%
14th	P063	2018–2020	Ahmad Faizal Azumu (أحمد فيصل ازومو)	PH (BERSATU)	38,661; 44.46%
14th	P063	2020–2022	Ahmad Faizal Azumu (أحمد فيصل ازومو)	PN (BERSATU)	38,661; 44.46%
15th	P063	2022–present	Anwar Ibrahim (انوار ابراهيم)	PH (PKR)	48,625; 39.77%

=== State constituency ===
Parliamentary constituency	State constituency						
Parliamentary constituency	1955–1959*	1959–1974	1974–1986	1986–1995	1995–2004	2004–2018	2018–present
Tambun				Chemor			
Tambun					Hulu Kinta		
Tambun					Manjoi		
Tambun				Sungai Rokam			

=== Historical boundaries ===
State Constituency	Area			
State Constituency	1984	1994	2003	2018
Chemor	Changkat Kinding; Chemor; Kanthan; Manjoi; Meru Raya			
Hulu Kinta		Changkat Kinding; Sunway Tambun; Taman Perpaduan; Taman Rapat; Tanjung Rambutan		Changkat Kinding; Kanthan; Sunway Tambun; Taman Perpaduan; Tanjung Rambutan
Manjoi		Chemor; Kanthan; Kelebang; Manjoi; Taman Tawas Mewah	Chemor; Kanthan; Kelebang; Manjoi; Meru Raya	Chemor; Chepor; Kelebang; Manjoi; Meru Raya
Sungai Rokam	Kampung Melayu Tambun; Taman Perpaduan; Taman Rapat; Tambun; Tanjung Rambutan			

=== Current state assembly members ===
No.	State Constituency	Member	Coalition (Party)
N23	Manjoi	Mohd Hafez Sabri	PN (PAS)
N24	Hulu Kinta	Muhamad Arafat Varisai Mahamad	PH (PKR)

=== Local governments & postcodes ===
No.	State Constituency	Local Government	Postcode
N23	Manjoi	Ipoh City Council	30010, 30020, 30100, 30520 Ipoh; 31150 Hulu Kinta; 31200 Chemor; 31250 Tanjung Rambutan
N24	Hulu Kinta	Ipoh City Council	30010, 30020, 30100, 30520 Ipoh; 31150 Hulu Kinta; 31200 Chemor; 31250 Tanjung Rambutan

== Election results ==
Malaysian general election, 2022
Party	Candidate	Votes	%	∆%
PH	Anwar Ibrahim	49,625	39.77	▼4.69
PN	Ahmad Faizal Azumu	45,889	36.78	▲36.78
BN	Aminuddin Md Hanafiah	28,140	22.55	▼15.80
GTA	Abdul Rahim Tahir	1,115	0.89	▲0.89
Total valid votes		124,769	100.00	
Total rejected ballots		1,369		
Unreturned ballots		306		
Turnout		126,444	77.71	▼4.80
Registered electors		160,558		
Majority		3,736	2.99	▼3.13
PH hold		Swing		
Source(s) https://lom.agc.gov.my/ilims/upload/portal/akta/outputp/1753277/PUB610%20PARLIMEN%20PERAK.pdf

Malaysian general election, 2018
Party	Candidate	Votes	%	∆%
PH	Ahmad Faizal Azumu	38,661	44.46	▲44.46
BN	Ahmad Husni Mohamad Hanadzlah	33,341	38.35	▼17.88
PAS	Muhamad Zulkifli Mohamad Zakaria	14,948	17.19	▲17.19
Total valid votes		86,950	100.00	
Total rejected ballots		960		
Unreturned ballots		1,010		
Turnout		88,920	82.51	▼2.78
Registered electors		107,763		
Majority		5,320	6.12	▼6.34
PH gain from BN		Swing		?
Source(s) "His Majesty's Government Gazette - Notice of Contested Election, Parliament for the State of Perak [P.U. (B) 237/2018]" (PDF). Attorney General's Chambers of Malaysia. 3 May 2018. "Federal Government Gazette - Results of Contested Election and Statements of the Poll after the Official Addition of Votes, Parliamentary Constituencies for the State of Perak [P.U. (B) 311/2018]" (PDF). Attorney General's Chambers of Malaysia. 28 May 2018.

Malaysian general election, 2013
Party	Candidate	Votes	%	∆%
BN	Ahmad Husni Mohamad Hanadzlah	42,093	56.23	▲0.90
PKR	Siti Aishah Shaik Ismail	32,768	43.77	▼0.90
Total valid votes		74,861	100.00	
Total rejected ballots		1,196		
Unreturned ballots		218		
Turnout		76,275	85.29	▲10.12
Registered electors		89,435		
Majority		9,325	12.46	▲1.80
BN hold		Swing		
Source(s) "Federal Government Gazette - Notice of Contested Election, Parliament for the State of Perak [P.U. (B) 174/2013]" (PDF). Attorney General's Chambers of Malaysia. 26 April 2013. Archived from the original (PDF) on 2019-12-29. "Federal Government Gazette - Results of Contested Election and Statements of the Poll after the Official Addition of Votes, Parliamentary Constituencies for the State of Perak [P.U. (B) 215/2013]" (PDF). Attorney General's Chambers of Malaysia. 22 May 2013.

Malaysian general election, 2008
Party	Candidate	Votes	%	∆%
BN	Ahmad Husni Mohamad Hanadzlah	27,942	55.33	▼13.42
PKR	Mohamad Asri Othman	22,556	44.67	▲44.67
Total valid votes		50,498	100.00	
Total rejected ballots		927		
Unreturned ballots		419		
Turnout		51,844	75.17	▲2.23
Registered electors		68,966		
Majority		5,386	10.66	▼26.84
BN hold		Swing		

Malaysian general election, 2004
Party	Candidate	Votes	%	∆%
BN	Ahmad Husni Mohamad Hanadzlah	31,824	68.75	▲10.34
PAS	Khairuddin Abdul Malik	14,464	31.25	▼10.34
Total valid votes		46,288	100.00	
Total rejected ballots		1,280		
Unreturned ballots		3		
Turnout		47,571	72.94	▲2.20
Registered electors		65,219		
Majority		17,360	37.50	▲20.68
BN hold		Swing		

Malaysian general election, 1999
Party	Candidate	Votes	%	∆%
BN	Ahmad Husni Mohamad Hanadzlah	24,595	58.41	▼25.05
PAS	Khairuddin Abdul Malik	17,511	41.59	▲41.59
Total valid votes		42,106	100.00	
Total rejected ballots		971		
Unreturned ballots		1,755		
Turnout		44,832	70.74	▼2.22
Registered electors		63,375		
Majority		7,084	16.82	▼50.10
BN hold		Swing		

Malaysian general election, 1995
Party	Candidate	Votes	%	∆%
BN	Ahmad Husni Mohamad Hanadzlah	33,224	83.46	▲20.38
S46	Abdul Rahman Md. Nur	6,585	16.54	▼20.38
Total valid votes		39,809	100.00	
Total rejected ballots		1,314		
Unreturned ballots		1,609		
Turnout		42,732	72.96	▼1.56
Registered electors		58,569		
Majority		26,639	66.92	▼40.76
BN hold		Swing		

Malaysian general election, 1990
Party	Candidate	Votes	%	∆%
BN	Nawawi Mat Awin	29,176	63.08	▼8.45
S46	Kamarudin Awang Teh	17,074	36.92	▲36.92
Total valid votes		46,250	100.00	
Total rejected ballots		1,987		
Unreturned ballots		0		
Turnout		48,237	74.52	▲6.67
Registered electors		64,726		
Majority		12,102	26.16	▼16.90
BN hold		Swing		

Malaysian general election, 1986
Party	Candidate	Votes	%
BN	Yahaya Mohd. Shafie	24,342	71.53
PAS	Ahmad Idzam Ahmad	9,687	28.47
Total valid votes		34,029	100.00
Total rejected ballots		2,058	
Unreturned ballots		0	
Turnout		36,087	67.85
Registered electors		53,184	
Majority		14,655	43.06
This was a new constituency created.
