= Chan Kong Choy =

Malaysian politician

Yang Berbahagia Tan Sri Dato' Sri Chan Kong Choy PSM SSAP PNBS DPMK DPMS DSAP
- 陈广才
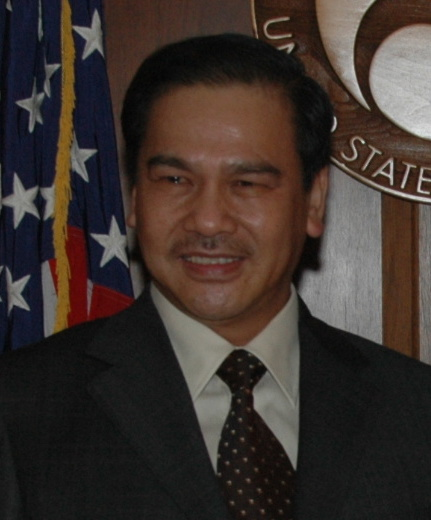
- Chan in 2004

Minister of Transport
- In office 1 July 2003 – 18 March 2008
- Monarchs: Sirajuddin; Mizan Zainal Abidin
- Prime Minister: Mahathir Mohamad; Abdullah Ahmad Badawi
- Deputy: 1. Ramli Ngah Talib (1999-2003); 2. Douglas Uggah Embas (2001-2008); 3. Tengku Azlan Sultan Abu Bakar (2004-2008)
- Preceded by: Ling Liong Sik
- Succeeded by: Ong Tee Keat
- Constituency: Selayang

Deputy Minister of Finance
- In office 15 December 1999 – 1 July 2003 Serving with Shafie Salleh
- Monarchs: Salahuddin; Sirajuddin
- Prime Minister: Mahathir Mohamad
- Minister: Daim Zainuddin (1999-2001); Mahathir Mohamad (2001-2003); Jamaluddin Jarjis (2002-2003)
- Succeeded by: Ng Yen Yen
- Constituency: Selayang

Deputy Minister of Energy, Communications and Multimedia
- In office 4 May 1995 – 14 December 1999
- Monarchs: Ja'afar; Salahuddin
- Prime Minister: Mahathir Mohamad
- Minister: Leo Moggie Irok
- Preceded by: Tajol Rosli Mohd Ghazali as Deputy Minister of Energy, Telecommunications and Posts
- Succeeded by: Tan Chai Ho as Deputy Minister of Energy, Water and Communications
- Constituency: Selayang

Deputy Minister of Culture, Arts and Tourism
- In office 27 October 1990 – 3 May 1995
- Monarchs: Azlan Shah; Ja'afar
- Prime Minister: Mahathir Mohamad
- Minister: Sabbaruddin Chik
- Preceded by: Ng Cheng Kuai
- Succeeded by: Teng Gaik Kwan
- Constituency: Lipis

Member of the Malaysian Parliament for Selayang
- In office 7 June 1995 – 8 March 2008
- Preceded by: Zaleha Ismail (BN–UMNO)
- Succeeded by: William Leong Jee Keen (PR–PKR)
- Majority: 38,627 (1995); 8,835 (1999); 23,226 (2004)

Member of the Malaysian Parliament for Lipis
- In office 3 December 1990 – 6 April 1995
- Preceded by: Wang Choon Wing (BN–MCA)
- Succeeded by: Abu Dahari Osman (BN–UMNO)
- Majority: 4,022 (1990)

Member of the Pahang State Legislative Assembly for Tanah Rata
- In office 3 August 1986 – 3 December 1990
- Preceded by: Sangaralingam Muthu Muthayal (BN–MIC)
- Succeeded by: Law Kee Long (BN–MCA)
- Majority: 1,889 (1986)

Personal details
- Born: 17 May 1955 (age 71) Bentong, Pahang, Malaya (now Malaysia)
- Party: Malaysian Chinese Association (MCA)
- Other political affiliations: Barisan Nasional (BN); Perikatan Nasional (PN)
- Spouse: Ann Chan
- Children: 4
- Education: University of Malaya
- Occupation: Businessman; Politician; Lecturer

Chan Kong Choy (simplified Chinese: 陈广才; traditional Chinese: 陳廣才; pinyin: Chén Guǎngcái; Jyutping: Can4 Gwong2 Coi4; born 17 May 1955) is a businessman leading two publicly listed companies in the Kuala Lumpur Stock Exchange (KLSE) as Executive Chairman. Further to that, he is also an adjunct professor at the University of Malaya and more than 15 years ago, he was a Malaysian politician who has never lost a general election in his two decade political career. He was the former deputy president of the Malaysian Chinese Association (MCA), a component party of the then-ruling Barisan Nasional (BN) coalition formerly Minister of Transport from 1 July 2003 to 18 March 2008.

in 2008, Chan was awarded 'Commander of the Order of Loyalty to the Crown of Malaysia' with the title of 'Tan Sri' by Yang di-Pertuan Agong. It is one of the highest honours bestowed by the Yang di-Pertuan Agong. The award can only be awarded to 250 living recipients globally at any one time.

== Life and career ==
Chan Kong Choy was born in Bentong, Pahang on 17 May 1955 to an ethnic Malaysian Chinese family of Cantonese descent with ancestry from Yunfu, Guangdong, China. He studied in Kolej Tunku Abdul Rahman in 1975 for his Sijil Tinggi Pelajaran Malaysia (STPM). He graduated with first class honours in Chinese Studies from University of Malaya in 1979. He went on to obtain a post-graduate Diploma in Education, University of Malaya in 1980.

He has served the MCA national leadership for 16 years. Chan has been a Minister for five years and thirteen years as Deputy Minister in the federal government beside four years as Pahang State executive councillor. He has served nine years as MCA Youth chairman, and the Federal and State Government portfolios continuously since 1986. In 1986 general election, Chan was elected as Pahang state assemblyman for Tanah Rata and he was selected by Pahang State Government as its executive councillor and held that post until 1990. After contested and won the parliamentary seat of Lipis, Pahang in the 1990 general election, Chan was elevated by the party leadership and made a Deputy Minister in the Culture, Arts and Tourism Ministry. In 1990, Chan became the party's National Youth chairman. Chan was re-elected to a second term as the National Youth chairman in the 1993 party elections.

Chan was made MCA vice-president in 1999 and subsequently assumed the Deputy Finance Minister's post after the general elections that same year. With his experience in the party leadership and Government, Chan faithfully remained as Deputy Minister and party vice-president. The MCA Central Committee appointed Chan as the party's new deputy president with the resignation of Datuk Lim Ah Lek from that post.

Chan was the Member of Parliament for Selayang, Selangor from 1995 to 2008. Chan successfully won the parliamentary constituency of Selayang in General Elections of 1990, 1995, 1999 and 2004 for the Barisan Nasional or National Front coalition.

Chan did not defend his parliamentary seat in the 12th general elections held on 18 March 2008 thus stepped down from his cabinet post as Transport Minister citing health reasons and to make way for young blood. He subsequently did not contest back the post of deputy president of MCA in the party election on 18 October 2008 too which was won by Chua Soi Lek.

After retiring from active politics, Chan pursued his passion in business and academia and is currently serving the University of Malaya as an adjunct professor.

In 2016, Chan donated his personal collection of literary works on 'The Dream of The Red Chamber', one of the four greatest classical novels in Chinese literature to University of Malaya. The collection has 6000 pieces of literary works and is touted as the largest private collection outside of mainland China.

in 2021, Chan assumed the role of Executive Chairman of Fajarbaru Builder Group Bhd, a diversified group spanning Construction, Property Development and Natural Resources listed in the Kuala Lumpur Stock Exchange.

In 2023, Chan assumed the role as Executive Chairman of PA Resources Bhd, one of the largest aluminum resources and extrusion business in Malaysia involved in all, upstream, midstream and downstream activities.

== Controversy ==
In 2011, Chan was charged with cheating former prime minister Abdullah Ahmad Badawi over the PKFZ scandal. Due to his court charges, the Sultan of Selangor, Sultan Sharafuddin Idris Shah temporarily suspended Chan's Datukship pending the outcome of the court trial, which subsequently happened to be a positive outcome for Chan. In 2014, the High Court acquitted Chan the three charges of cheating in the PKFZ scandal after the prosecution withdrew charges against him thus clearing his name of any wrongdoing.

== Personal life ==
Chan is married to Ann Chan and the couple has four children.

== Chronology of past political positions ==
- Political Secretary
  Ministry of Housing & Local Government (Datuk Lee Kim Sai)
  1986
- EXCO Member
  Pahang State Government
  1986 - 1990
- Member of Parliament
  1990 - 2008
- Deputy Minister
  Culture, Arts & Tourism
  1990 - 1995
- Deputy Minister
  Energy, Communication & Multimedia
  1995 - 1999
- Deputy Minister
  Ministry of Finance
  1999 - May 2003
- Minister of Transport
  1 July 2003 - 18 March 2008

== Election results ==
Pahang State Legislative Assembly
Year	Constituency	Candidate	Votes	Pct	Opponent(s)	Votes	Pct	Ballots cast	Majority	Turnout
1986	N01 Tanah Rata	Chan Kong Choy (MCA)	4,006	52.22%	Poom Man Kem (DAP)	2,117	27.60%	7,671	1,889	63.22%
1986	N01 Tanah Rata	Chan Kong Choy (MCA)	4,006	52.22%	Aleyak (IND)	890	11.60%	7,671	1,889	63.22%
1986	N01 Tanah Rata	Chan Kong Choy (MCA)	4,006	52.22%	Haji Mazlan Taib (IND)	318	4.15%	7,671	1,889	63.22%

Parliament of Malaysia
Year	Constituency	Candidate	Votes	Pct	Opponent(s)	Votes	Pct	Ballots cast	Majority	Turnout
1990	P072 Lipis	Chan Kong Choy (MCA)	15,170	57.64%	Amin Hussaini Abd Manan (S46)	11,148	42.36%	27,462	4,022	70.37%
1995	P090 Selayang	Chan Kong Choy (MCA)	45,392	87.03%	Zainul Amri Abdul Aziz (IND)	6,765	12.97%	54,731	38,627	69.89%
1999	P090 Selayang	Chan Kong Choy (MCA)	34,979	57.23%	Zaitun Mohamed Kasim (DAP)	26,144	42.77%	63,275	8,835	73.94%
2004	P097 Selayang	Chan Kong Choy (MCA)	36,343	73.48%	Koh Swe Yong (PKR)	13,117	26.52%	51,033	23,226	71.72%

== Honours ==
=== Honours of Malaysia ===
- Malaysia
  - Commander of the Order of Loyalty to the Crown of Malaysia (PSM) – Tan Sri (2008)
- Kelantan
  - Knight Commander of the Order of the Crown of Kelantan (DPMK) – Dato' (2003)
- Pahang
  - Grand Knight of the Order of Sultan Ahmad Shah of Pahang (SSAP) – Dato' Sri (2003)
  - Knight Companion of the Order of Sultan Ahmad Shah of Pahang (DSAP) – Dato' (1990)
- Sarawak
  - Knight Commander of the Order of the Star of Sarawak (PNBS) – Dato Sri (2006)
- Selangor
  - Knight Commander of the Order of the Crown of Selangor (DPMS) – Dato' (2003)
