= Ministry of Economy (Malaysia) =

Government ministry of Malaysia

- Kementerian Ekonomi
- Seal of Malaysian Government

Agency overview
- Formed: 21 May 2018; 8 years ago
- Preceding agency: Ministry of Economic Affairs
- Type: Government
- Headquarters: 26, Persiaran Perdana, Presint 3, 62000 Putrajaya
- Annual budget: MYR 2,747,774,900 (2026)
- Minister responsible: Haji Akmal Nasrullah bin Mohd Nasir, Minister of Economy
- Deputy Minister responsible: Dato' Indera Mohd Shahar bin Abdullah, Deputy Minister of Economy
- Agency executives: Dato' Nor Azmi bin Diron, Chief Secretary; Datuk Badrul Hisham bin Mohd, Deputy Secretary-General (Sectoral); Dato' Ts V Valluvan Veloo, Deputy Secretary-General (Macro); Datuk Dr Zunika binti Mohamed, Deputy Secretary-General (Policy)
- Website: www.ekonomi.gov.my

The Ministry of Economy (Malay: Kementerian Ekonomi) is a ministry of the Government of Malaysia that is responsible for economy planning, statistics and socioeconomy planning.

== Organization ==
- Minister of Economy
  - Deputy Minister
    - Secretary-General
      - Under the Authority of Secretary-General
        - Senior Undersecretary (Management)
        - Finance Division
        - Human Resource Division
        - Account Division
        - Management Services Division
        - Economic Action Council
        - Development Budget Division
        - Corporation Communication Unit
        - Office of the Legal Adviser
        - Internal Audit Unit
      - Deputy Secretary-General (Sectoral)
        - Infrastructures and Public Utilities Division
        - Agriculture Division
        - Value Management Division
        - Energy Division
        - Security and Public Order Division
      - Deputy Secretary-General (Macro)
        - Macroeconomics Division
        - Services Industry Division
        - Manufacturing Industry, Science and Technology Division
        - K-Economy Division
        - Environmental and Natural Resource Economics Division
        - Development Division
        - Information Management Division
        - Statistics Unit
      - Deputy Secretary-General (Policy)
        - Equity Development Division
        - Social Services Division
        - Regional Development Division
        - Human Capital Development Division
        - Strategic Planning Division
        - Coordination, Control and Monitoring Division
        - Economic Action Council Secretariat
        - Unit Pangkalan Data Utama (PADU)
        - International Cooperation Division

=== Federal departments & agencies ===
1. Department of Statistics Malaysia (DOSM).
2. Iskandar Regional Development Authority (IRDA).
3. Northern Corridor Implementation Authority (NCIA).
4. East Coast Economic Region Development Council (ECERDC).
5. Sabah Economic Development and Investment Authority (SEDIA).
6. Regional Corridor Development Authority (RECODA).
7. Ekuiti Nasional Berhad (EKUINAS).
8. Malaysia Petroleum Resources Corporation (MPRC).
9. Johor Petroleum Development Corporation (JPDC).
10. Yayasan Ekuiti Nasional.
11. Teraju Bumiputera Corporation.
12. Unit Peneraju Agenda Bumiputera (TERAJU).
13. Yayasan Peneraju (YP).
14. 13 State Economic Development Corporations (SEDCs).

== Ministers ==
Minister	Portrait	Office	Executive Experience
Akmal Nasrullah Mohd Nasir		Minister of Economy	MP for Johor Bahru (May 2018 – current); Deputy Minister of Local Government Development (December 2022 – December 2023); Deputy Minister of Energy Transition and Water Transformation (December 2023 – December 2025)
Mohd Shahar Abdullah		Deputy Minister of Economy	MP for Paya Besar (May 2018 – current); Deputy Minister of Finance (March 2020 – November 2022); Deputy Minister of Energy Transition and Water Transformation (December 2023 – December 2025); Chairman of the Government Backbenchers Club (March 2024 – January 2025)

== See also ==
- Minister of Economy (Malaysia)
- Ministry of Finance (Malaysia)
