= Syed Ahmad Alwee Alsree =

Singaporean lawyer and businessman

Datuk Syed Ahmad Alwee Alsree (Arabic: سيد أحمد علوي السري Saiyid Aḥmad Alawī al-sirī) is the Group Executive Director of Cahya Mata Sarawak Berhad (CMSB).

== Early life and education ==
Ahmad was born in Singapore

Ahmad graduated with a Bachelor of Law (LL.B.) from the National University of Singapore, and practised law in Singapore for over 10 years prior to joining CMS Group.

== Career ==
Ahmad moved to Kuching when he joined Cahya Mata Sarawak Berhad in February 2004 as Group General Manager – Human Resources. He was appointed as Group Executive Director of CMSB on 19 August 2008 following an earlier appointment as Deputy Group Managing Director in September 2006.

Ahmad had worked with his brother-in-law Datuk Seri Sulaiman Abdul Rahman Taib. He is currently working with Mahmud Abu Bekir Taib, Sulaiman Taib's brother. He is now working as a director of Rashid Hussain Berhad (RHB Bank), CMS Trust Management Berhad and CMS Works International Ltd.

Ahmad received the honorary Panglima Jasa Negara (PJN) award which carries the title 'Datuk' from the Yang di-Pertuan Agong Tuanku Mizan Zainal Abidin in conjunction with His Majesty's birthday on 12 November 2009.

== Personal life ==
Ahmad is married to Hanifah Hajar Taib, the Deputy Minister of Economy, the Member of Parliament for Mukah and the daughter of Abdul Taib Mahmud, the former Yang di-Pertua Negeri and former Chief Minister of Sarawak.
