= Department of Irrigation and Drainage =

Malaysian government agency

- Jabatan Pengairan dan Saliran جابتن ڤڠايرن دان ساليرن
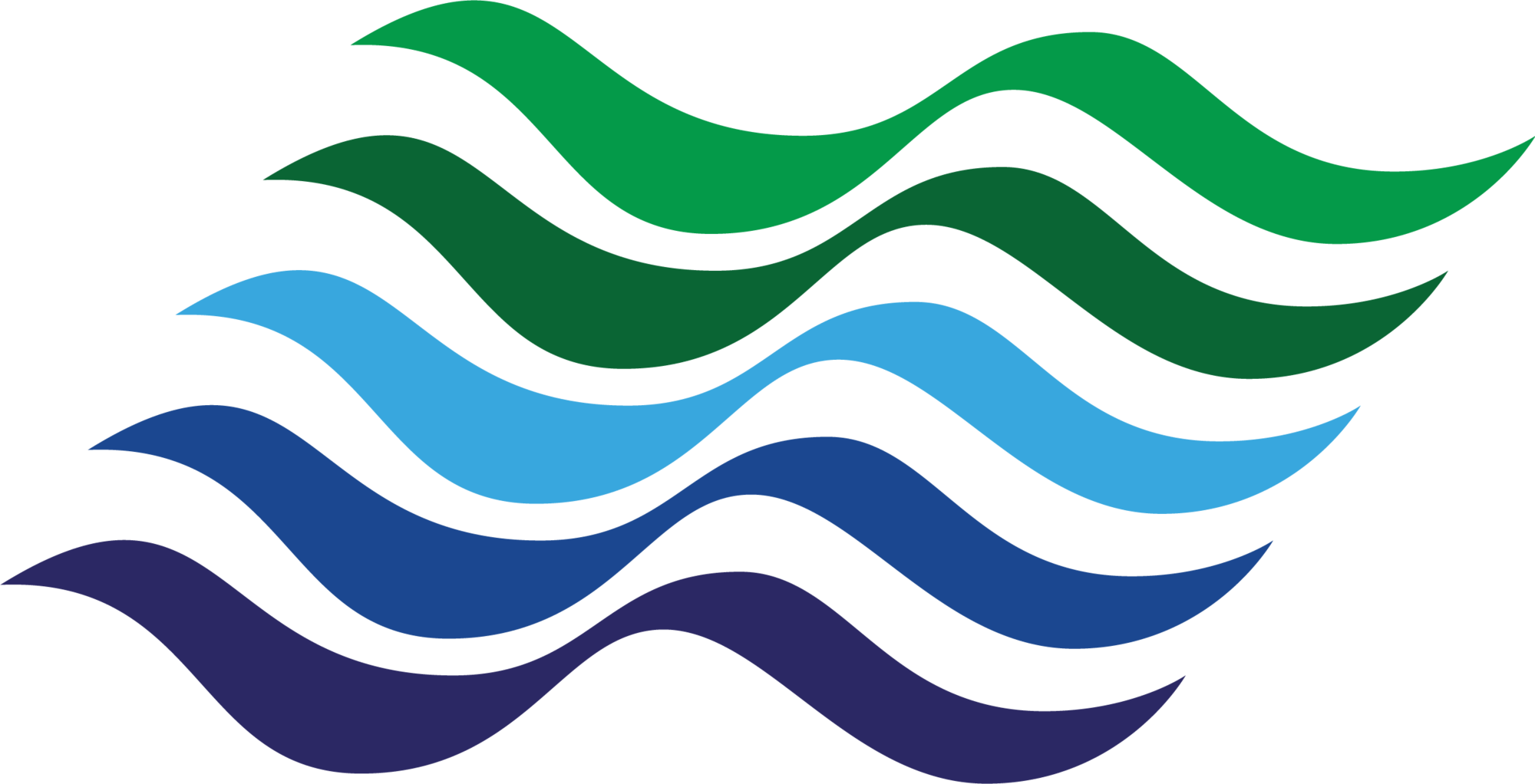

Department overview
- Formed: 1 January 1932; 94 years ago
- Jurisdiction: Government of Malaysia
- Headquarters: Jalan Sultan Salahuddin, 50626 Kuala Lumpur, Malaysia
- Motto: "Jayakan Perkhidmatan Sempurna" ("Achieve the Perfect Service")
- Minister responsible: Fadillah Yusof, Minister of Energy Transition and Water Transformation
- Deputy Minister responsible: Akmal Nasir, Deputy Minister of Energy Transition and Water Transformation
- Department executive: Hj. Ahmad Anuar Hassan, Director-General
- Parent Department: Ministry of Energy Transition and Water Transformation
- Key documents: Drainage Works Act 1954; Waters Act 1920
- Website: www.water.gov.my

The Department of Irrigation and Drainage (Malay: Jabatan Pengairan dan Saliran; Jawi: جابتن ڤڠايرن دان ساليرن; officially abbreviated as JPS or DID) is a Malaysian government agency under the Ministry of Energy Transition and Water Transformation. Established in 1932, it is entrusted to regulate and oversee issues and many aspects related to Malaysian waterworks.

== History ==
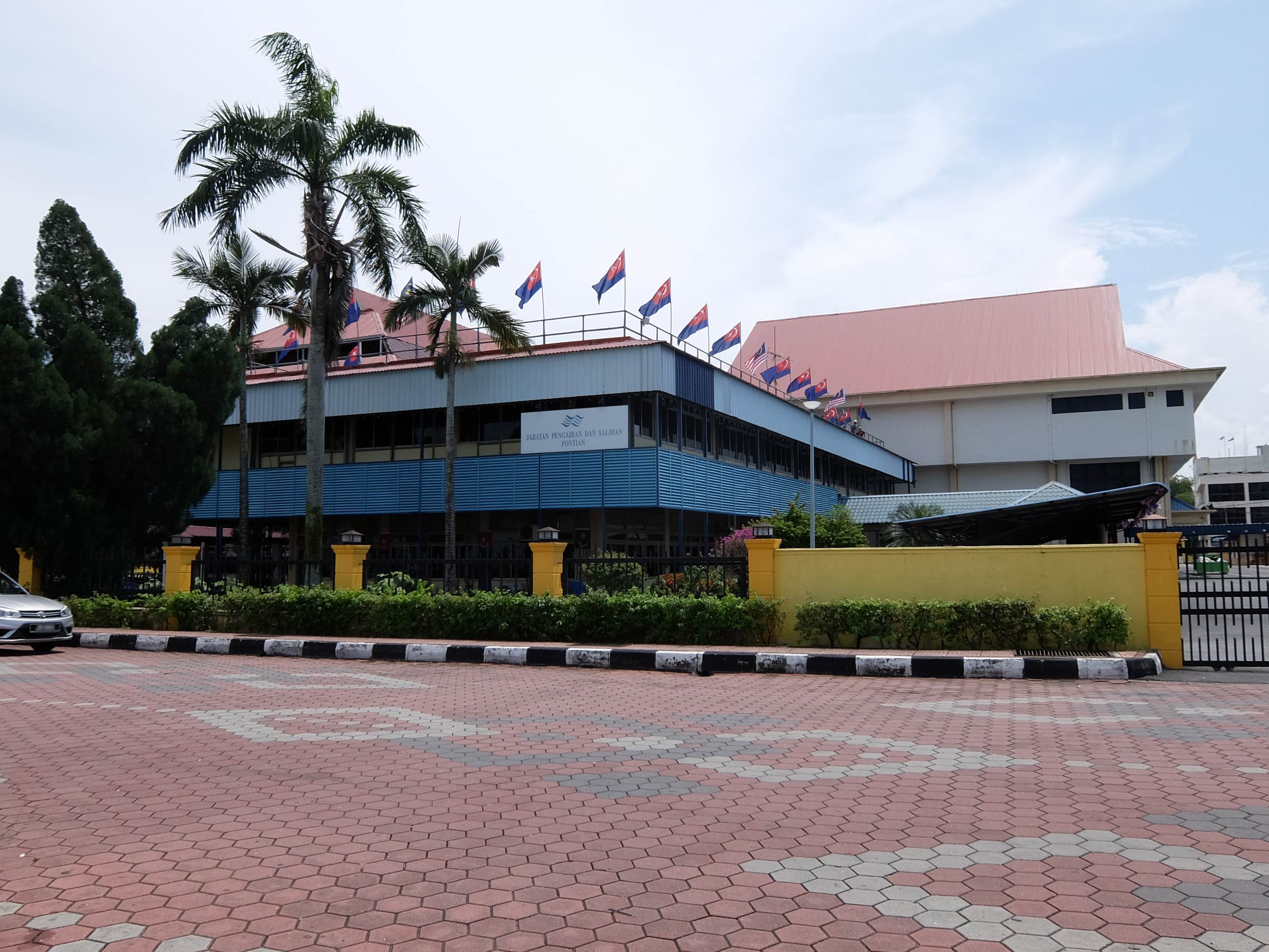
The DID branch in Pontian, Johor.

The Department of Irrigation and Drainage's origins dates back in 1913 when it was established as a Waterworks Branch under the Ministry of Works, which functioned to handles the hydrological research. In 1920, the Drainage Branch renamed as the Hydraulic Branch with its roles and responsibilities expanded, including measurement works and river preservation efforts.

On 1 January 1932, the Hydraulic Branch was upgraded into a government department and known as the Drainage and Waterworks Department. Following the establishment of Malaysia in 1963, additional state Drainage and Waterworks Departments were established in Sabah and Sarawak, increasing the number of State Departments to thirteen with its federal headquarters being responsible for the drainage and waterworks affairs nationwide.

Flood mitigation was made an additional responsibility of the Department from 1972 onwards. By 1980, the DID implemented 6 out of the 20 irrigation programs under the Third Malaysia Plan. Since 1986, coastal engineering has become another additional function of the Department. On 15 March 1989, the Drainage and Waterworks Department was renamed as the Department of Irrigation and Drainage to reflect its broader responsibilities.

In February 1993, the DID launched an awareness campaign called Cintailah Sungai Kita (Love Our River) in an effort to fostering a love of rivers among Malaysian society. Two months later, the department uses the academic personnel from the Universiti Sains Malaysia's (USM) Communications Programme to studying water management for farmers in three northern areas of the Peninsular Malaysia. Through its Hydrological Equipment Unit, the department became the first Malaysian government agency to received the MS ISO 9000 certification in 1996. The department's information technology (IT) division was set up in 1998, while by the following year, its Planning and Evaluation Division was renamed as the Corporate Development Division.

In 2000, the DID underwent restructuring which saws the establishment of the Drainage and Flood Mitigation Division and the re-identification its core business. It also introduced a new manual guide called the Urban Drainage System as a long-term measure to overcome flooding problems in rapidly developing areas nationwide. The DID introduced its Environmentally-Friendly Drainage Manual, which requires all government agencies and property developers to adopt the manual as the approval condition of developmental projects. The manual guideline began implemented on 1 January 2001.

Also, in 2001, the department and the Malaysian Highway Authority (LLM) along with a consortium joint venture pact between Gamuda Berhad and MMC Corporation Berhad spearheaded a project of construction on what would become the SMART Tunnel. The tunnel's construction began in 2003 and fully completed and began operations in 2007. In August 2002, the department launched Info Banjir, which enables the public to access the current information on floods in Malaysia. On 27 March 2004, the DID was placed under the Ministry of Natural Resources and Environment (NRE).

On 1 November 2011, the DID launched the Public InfoBanjir website, which is specifically designed to provide early information on floods in a systematic and integrated manner to public nationwide, thereby enabling them to make preparations and take early action to overcome with it. By 2012, the DID embarked on multiple flood mitigation projects to help reduce the recurring flood occurrences within the Klang Valley.

In January 2024, the department was placed under the Ministry of Energy Transition and Public Utilities. The DID began to revise the suitability of the Prohibited Areas and Prohibited Places Act 1959 (Act 298) in January 2025, with the aim to consider certain dams in Malaysia to be developed as a recreational areas.

== Act and functions ==
The DID's functions are clearly defined by an Act of Parliament which is the Functions of Ministries Act, 1969 P.U (A) 184 - Orders of the Federal Government Ministers (No. 2) 2013, which came into effect on 16 May 2013. Among of its functions are:

- Implementation of planning and development of flood and drought systems, management of hydrological data and information and assessment and management of national water resources
- River basin planning and management development
- Improve infrastructure planning and development as well as water management for gardens and other agricultural needs
- Development of flood mitigation program planning and management
- Implementation of coastal zone development and management to reduce coastal erosion and sediment problems in river estuaries
- Manages and regulates the implementation of rain management program in the urban areas

The DID also oversees irrigation and drainage system in the country's agricultural industry and built infrastructures for agricultural purposes such as canals, drains and water pumps.

== Divisions ==
The DID consists the following divisions covering three segments:

- Businesses
  - River Basin Management
  - Coastal Zone Management
  - Special Project
  - Hydrology and Water Resources
  - Flood Management
  - Environmentally Friendly Drainage
- Specialists
  - Contract Management and Material Measure
  - Dam and Design
  - HTC Kuala Lumpur
  - Mechanical and Electrical Services
  - Building and Infrastructure
- Managements
  - Management Services
  - Corporate
  - Information Management
  - Human Capital Development
  - Performance Audit
  - GIS and Facility Management

== See also ==
- Water in Malaysia
