= Ministry of Energy Transition and Water Transformation (Malaysia) =

Government ministry of Malaysia

- Kementerian Peralihan Tenaga dan Air
- Seal of Malaysian Government

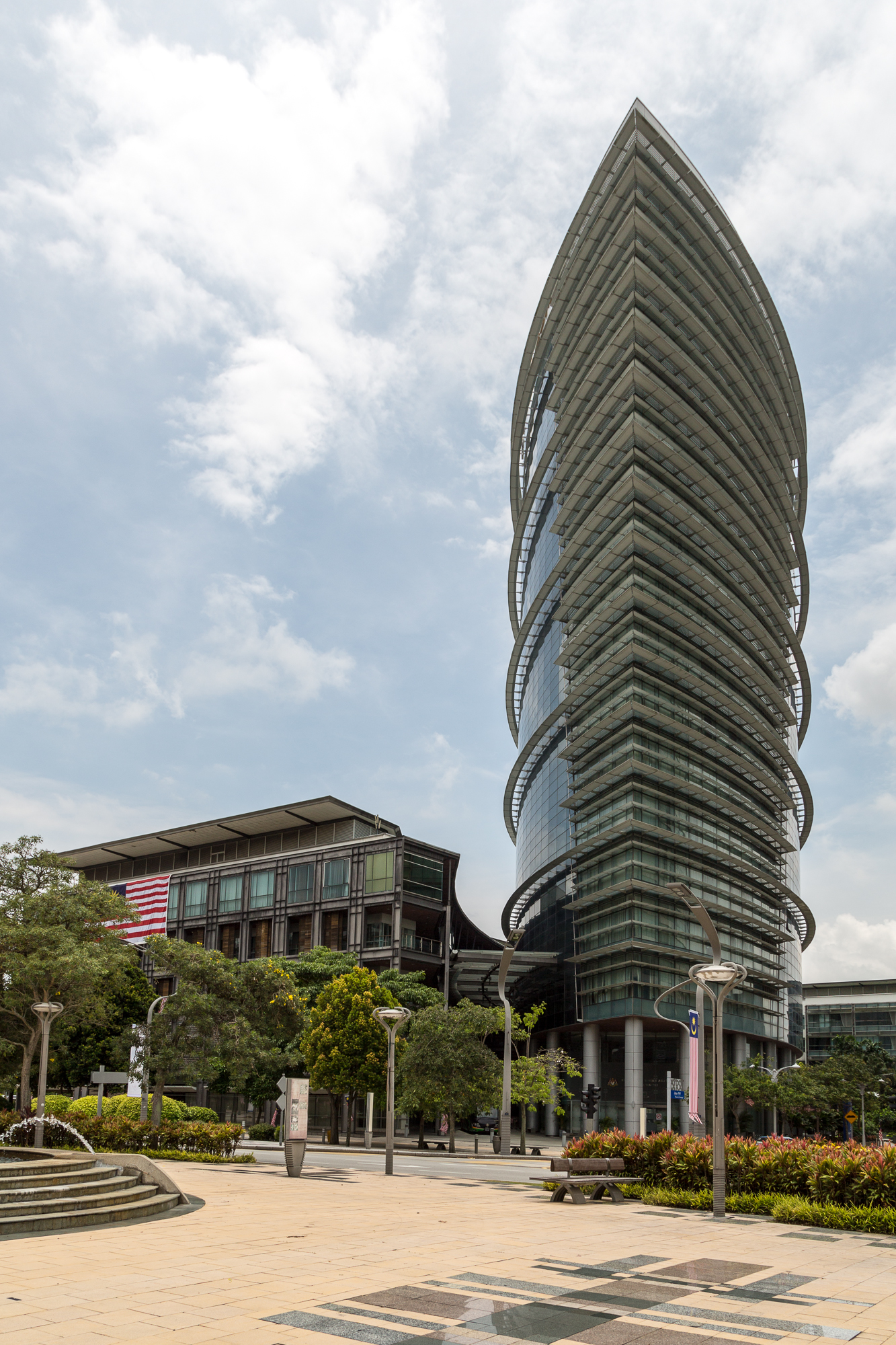

Agency overview
- Formed: 13 December 2023
- Preceding agency: Ministry of Natural Resources, Energy and Climate Change
- Type: Government
- Headquarters: Menara Petra, Presint 4, 62574 Putrajaya
- Annual budget: MYR 5,191,702,000 (2026)
- Minister responsible: Dato Amar Haji Fadillah bin Haji Yusof, Minister of Energy Transition and Water Transformation
- Deputy Minister responsible: Dato' Sri Abdul Rahman bin Mohamad, Deputy Minister of Energy Transition and Water Transformation
- Agency executives: Dato' Haji Mad Zaidi Mohd Karli, Chief Secretary; Mareena binti Mahpudz, Deputy Secretary-General (Energy); Dato' Mohd Rodzwan bin Mohd Baba Sakri, Deputy Secretary-General (Water); Dato' Mohd Morhisham bin Musa, Senior Under-Secretary (Management)
- Website: petra.gov.my

The Ministry of Energy Transition and Water Transformation (Malay: Kementerian Peralihan Tenaga dan Air) is a ministry of the Government of Malaysia established on December 12, 2023, to spearhead the nation's digital transformation and competitiveness. The ministry oversees key areas, including electricity, water management, sewage treatment and energy development.

The Ministry of Energy Transition and Water Transformation is headquartered in Menara PETRA, Precinct 4, Putrajaya.

== Organization ==
- Minister of Energy Transition and Water Transformation
  - Deputy Minister
    - Secretary-General
      - Under the Authority of Secretary-General
        - Senior Undersecretary (Management)
        - Human Resources Management Division
        - Office of the Legal Adviser
        - Finance and Earning Division
        - Development Division
        - Account Division
        - Information Management Division
        - Management Service Division
        - Strategic Planning and International Relationship Division
        - Integrity Unit
        - Internal Audit Unit
        - Corporate Communications Unit
      - Deputy Secretary-General (Energy)
        - Energy Supply Division
        - Energy Sustainable Division
        - Sabah Electricity Supply Special Project Team
        - Electricity Supply Industry Trust Account Unit
      - Deputy Secretary-General (Water)
        - Water and Sewerage Services Division
        - 2040 Water Sector Transformation Unit
        - Water Resources Division

== Ministers ==
Minister	Portrait	Office	Executive Experience
Fadillah Yusof		Minister of Energy Transition and Water Transformation	MP for Petra Jaya (March 2004 – current); Deputy Minister of Science, Technology and Innovation (March 2008 – May 2013); Minister of Works (May 2013 – May 2018; March 2020 – November 2022); Deputy Prime Minister (November 2022 – present); Minister of Plantation and Commodities (November 2022 – November 2023)
Abdul Rahman Mohamad		Deputy Minister of Energy Transition and Water Transformation	MLA for Padang Tengku (March 2004 – May 2013); MP for Lipis (May 2013 – current); Deputy Minister of Rural Development (March 2020 – November 2022); Deputy Minister of Works (December 2022 – December 2023); Deputy Minister of Human Resources (December 2023 – December 2025)

== See also ==
- Minister of Energy Transition and Water Transformation
