= Hanifah Hajar Taib =

Malaysian politician

Yang Berhormat Dato Hanifah Hajar Taib Alsree PSBS MP
- حنيفة حجر طيب

Deputy Minister of Health
- Incumbent
- Assumed office 17 December 2025
- Monarch: Ibrahim Iskandar
- Prime Minister: Anwar Ibrahim
- Minister: Dzulkefly Ahmad
- Preceded by: Lukanisman Awang Sauni
- Constituency: Mukah

Deputy Minister of Economy
- In office 10 December 2022 – 17 December 2025
- Monarchs: Abdullah (2022–2024); Ibrahim Iskandar (since 2024)
- Prime Minister: Anwar Ibrahim
- Minister: Rafizi Ramli (2022–2025); Amir Hamzah Azizan (acting)
- Preceded by: Eddin Syazlee Shith (Deputy Minister in the Prime Minister's Department (Economy))
- Constituency: Mukah

Deputy Minister in the Prime Minister's Department (Sabah and Sarawak Affairs)
- In office 30 August 2021 – 24 November 2022
- Monarch: Abdullah
- Prime Minister: Ismail Sabri Yaakob
- Minister: Maximus Ongkili
- Preceded by: Herself
- Succeeded by: Wilson Ugak Kumbong
- Constituency: Mukah
- In office 10 March 2020 – 16 August 2021
- Monarch: Abdullah
- Prime Minister: Muhyiddin Yassin
- Minister: Maximus Ongkili
- Preceded by: Position established
- Succeeded by: Herself
- Constituency: Mukah

Member of the Malaysian Parliament for Mukah
- Incumbent
- Assumed office 9 May 2018
- Preceded by: Leo Michael Toyad (BN–PBB)
- Majority: 7,000 (2018); 15,686 (2022)

Faction represented in Dewan Rakyat
- 2018: Parti Pesaka Bumiputera Bersatu
- 2018–: Gabungan Parti Sarawak

Personal details
- Born: Hanifah Hajar binti Abdul Taib; 28 August 1972 (age 54) Kuching, Sarawak, Malaysia
- Party: Parti Pesaka Bumiputera Bersatu (PBB)
- Other political affiliations: Barisan Nasional (BN) (until 2018); Gabungan Parti Sarawak (GPS) (since 2018)
- Spouse: Syed Ahmad Alwee Alsree
- Relations: Ragad Waleed Alkurdi (Step-mother); Sulaiman Abdul Rahman Taib (Brother); Mahmud Abu Bekir Taib (Brother); Jamilah Taib Murray (Sister)
- Parent(s): Abdul Taib Mahmud (died 2024); Laila Taib (died 2009)
- Education: University of San Francisco
- Occupation: Politician
- Profession: Businesswoman

Hanifah Hajar binti Abdul Taib; also known as Hanifah Hajar Taib Alsree (born 28 August 1972) is a Malaysian politician and businesswoman who has served as the Deputy Minister of Economy in the Unity Government administration under Prime Minister Anwar Ibrahim and Minister Rafizi Ramli since December 2022 and the Member of Parliament (MP) for Mukah since May 2018. She was the Deputy Minister in the Prime Minister's Department in charge of Sabah and Sarawak Affairs for the second term in the Barisan Nasional (BN) administration under former Prime Minister Ismail Sabri Yaakob and Minister Maximus Ongkili from August 2021 to the collapse of the PN administration in November 2022 and the first term in the Perikatan Nasional (PN) administration under former Prime Minister Muhyiddin Yassin and Minister Maximus Ongkili from March 2020 to August 2021. She is a member of the Parti Pesaka Bumiputera Bersatu (PBB), a component party of the Gabungan Parti Sarawak (GPS) coalition and formerly BN coalitions. She is also the daughter of Abdul Taib Mahmud, the former Yang di-Pertua Negeri of Sarawak and former Chief Minister of Sarawak.

== Background ==
Hanifah is the youngest daughter of the former Yang di-Pertua Negeri of Sarawak Abdul Taib Mahmud, who was the longest-serving Chief Minister of Sarawak. while her mother, Laila Taib (née Lejla Chaleck), is Polish Lipka Tatar Muslim. She graduated from the University of San Francisco with a Bachelor of Science in Business Administration.

Before venturing into politics, she spent about two decades working in different fields. She is chief executive officer at Limkokwing University of Creative Technology as well as the Executive Director at Cats FM and Miri Marriott Resort & Spa. She is also a shareholder of Cahya Mata Sarawak Berhad and the Non-Independent & Non-Executive Director of Sarawak Cable Berhad. She is also the Chairwoman of Pertubuhan Kebajikan Islam Malaysia (PERKIM) Wanita Bahagian Sarawak.

Hanifah is married to a Singaporean businessman Syed Ahmad Alwee Alsree since 2000. In 2017, her wealth was estimated at RM 309 million, making her one of the richest women in Malaysia.

== Election results ==
Parliament of Malaysia
Year	Constituency	Candidate	Votes	Pct	Opponent(s)	Votes	Pct	Ballot cast	Majority	Turnout
2018	P213 Mukah	Hanifah Hajar Taib (PBB)	13,853	66.90%	Abdul Jalil Bujang (PKR)	6,853	33.10%	21,205	7,000	69.28%
2022	P213 Mukah	Hanifah Hajar Taib (PBB)	21,733	78.23%	Abdul Jalil Bujang (PKR)	6,047	21.77%	28,167	15,686	59.15%

== Honours ==
=== Honours of Malaysia ===
- Malaysia
  - Recipient of the 17th Yang di-Pertuan Agong Installation Medal (2024)
- Sarawak
  - Commander of the Order of the Star of Sarawak (PSBS) – Dato (2013)
  - Gold Medal of the Sarawak Independence Diamond Jubilee Medal (2023)
