= Mohd Shahar Abdullah =

Malaysian politician

Yang Berhormat Dato’ Sri Mohd Shahar Abdullah SSAP SIMP MP
- محمّد شاهر عبدﷲ
- Shahar in 2020

Deputy Minister of Economy
- Incumbent
- Assumed office 16 December 2025
- Monarch: Ibrahim Iskandar
- Prime Minister: Anwar Ibrahim
- Minister: Akmal Nasir
- Preceded by: Hanifah Hajar Taib

Deputy Minister of Finance I
- In office 30 August 2021 – 24 November 2022 Serving with Yamani Hafez Musa (Deputy Minister of Finance II)
- Monarch: Abdullah
- Prime Minister: Ismail Sabri Yaakob
- Minister: Tengku Zafrul Aziz
- Preceded by: Abdul Rahim Bakri
- Succeeded by: Ahmad Maslan
- Constituency: Paya Besar

Deputy Minister of Finance II
- In office 10 March 2020 – 16 August 2021 Serving with Abdul Rahim Bakri (Deputy Minister of Finance I)
- Monarch: Abdullah
- Prime Minister: Muhyiddin Yassin
- Minister: Tengku Zafrul Aziz
- Preceded by: Amiruddin Hamzah (Deputy Minister of Finance)
- Succeeded by: Yamani Hafez Musa
- Constituency: Paya Besar

Chairman of the Government Backbenchers Club
- In office 7 March 2024 – 21 January 2026
- Monarch: Ibrahim Iskandar
- Prime Minister: Anwar Ibrahim
- Deputy: Khoo Poay Tiong
- Preceded by: Johari Abdul Ghani
- Succeeded by: Zaliha Mustafa

Member of the Malaysian Parliament for Paya Besar
- Incumbent
- Assumed office 9 May 2018
- Preceded by: Abdul Manan Ismail (BN–UMNO)
- Majority: 5,742 (2018); 1,317 (2022)

Faction represented in Dewan Rakyat
- 2018–: Barisan Nasional

Personal details
- Born: Mohd Shahar bin Abdullah; 6 December 1979 (age 46) Paya Besar, Kuantan, Pahang, Malaysia
- Citizenship: Malaysian
- Party: United Malays National Organisation (UMNO)
- Other political affiliations: Barisan Nasional (BN)
- Education: Universiti Teknologi Malaysia (DipEng, BEng, MEng)
- Occupation: Politician

Mohd Shahar bin Abdullah (Jawi: محمد شاهر بن عبدﷲ; born 6 December 1979) is a Malaysian politician who has served as the Deputy Minister of Economy under Minister Akmal Nasir since December 2025 and the Member of Parliament (MP) for Paya Besar since May 2018. He also served as the Deputy Minister of Finance I from August 2021 to November 2022 and Deputy Minister of Finance II from March 2020 to August 2021.

== Early life and education ==
He born and grew up in FELDA Sungai Panching Selatan, Paya Besar, Kuantan and received his education at SK Panching Selatan and Kolej Vokasional Kemaman (previously known as Sekolah Menengah Teknik Kemaman). Shahar obtained his Bachelor and Master of Electrical Engineering at Universiti Teknologi Malaysia (UTM), where he served as president of the student council. In 2024, he began pursuing his PhD in Artificial Intelligence at UTM and is expecting to complete by December 2026. In October 2026, he started his Master of Economics at University of Malaya (UM).

== Political career ==
Shahar contested and won the parliamentary seat of Paya Besar, Pahang for Barisan Nasional in the 2018 Malaysian general election, defeating Mohamad Azhar Mohd Noor from PAS and Mohd Ashraf Mustaqim from Pakatan Harapan by a majority of 5,742 votes .

In the 2022 Malaysian general election, he retained the parliamentary seat of Paya Besar after receiving 26,899 votes, defeating Perikatan Nasional candidate Aireroshairi Roslan by a majority of 1,317 votes.

In June 2023, Shahar was appointed chairman of the Parliamentary Special Select Committee on Finance and Economy. As chairman, he has led the committee's examination of policies and conducted proceedings on Malaysia's fiscal policy, financial regulation and economic development He also served as chairman of the Government Backbenchers Club before his appointment as Deputy Minister of Economy .

=== Deputy Finance Minister ===
On 9 March 2020, he was appointed Deputy Minister of Finance II to the Muhyiddin cabinet of the PN administration, serving under Minister of Finance Tengku Zafrul Aziz.

Following the formation of the Ismail Sabri Cabinet In August 2021, Shahar served as Deputy Minister of Finance I where he continued to serve until November 2022.

=== Deputy Economy Minister ===
In a cabinet reshuffle on 16 December 2025, Shahar was appointed Deputy Minister of Economy in the Unity Government administration under Minister Akmal Nasir.

=== Party Leadership ===
He is the division chief of UMNO Paya Besar and was Youth Information Chief of UMNO from 2018-2023.

In June 2018, he contested for the UMNO Youth Chief position but lost to Asyraf Wajdi Dusuki. He contested the Youth Chief position but lost again to Akmal Saleh during the 2023 United Malays National Organisation leadership election.

== Personal life ==
Shahar is married to Syarifah Nur Insyirah Saifuddin Shah and they have one son. He is an avid runner.

== Election results ==
Parliament of Malaysia
Year	Constituency	Candidate	Votes	Pct	Opponent(s)	Votes	Pct	Ballots cast	Majority	Turnout
2018	P084 Paya Besar	Mohd Shahar Abdullah (UMNO)	19,033	43.16%	Mohamad Azhar Mohd Noor (PAS)	13,291	30.14%	44,942	5,742	81.51%
2018	P084 Paya Besar	Mohd Shahar Abdullah (UMNO)	19,033	43.16%	Mohd Ashraf Mustaqim Badrul Munir (BERSATU)	11,776	26.70%	44,942	5,742	81.51%
2022	P084 Paya Besar	Mohd Shahar Abdullah (UMNO)	26,899	43.40%	Aireroshairi Roslan (PAS)	25,582	41.27%	61,983	1,317	77.73%
2022	P084 Paya Besar	Mohd Shahar Abdullah (UMNO)	26,899	43.40%	Ahmad Azam Mohd Salleh (AMANAH)	9,192	14.83%	61,983	1,317	77.73%
2022	P084 Paya Besar	Mohd Shahar Abdullah (UMNO)	26,899	43.40%	Rosaminhar Mohd Amin (PEJUANG)	310	0.50%	61,983	1,317	77.73%

== Honours ==
=== Honours of Malaysia ===
- Malaysia
  - Recipient of the 17th Yang di-Pertuan Agong Installation Medal (2024)
- Pahang
  - Knight Grand Companion of the Order of Sultan Ahmad Shah of Pahang (SSAP) – Dato' Sri (2026)
  - Knight Grand Companion of the Order of the Crown of Pahang (SIMP) – Dato' Indera (2021)
