= Siti Zaharah Sulaiman =

Malaysian politician (1949–2024)

Yang Berbahagia Tan Sri Dato' Sri Siti Zaharah Sulaiman PSM SSAP
- سيتي زهرة سليمان

Minister of National Unity and Community Development
- In office 15 December 1999 – 26 March 2004
- Monarchs: Salahuddin; Sirajuddin
- Prime Minister: Mahathir Mohamad; Abdullah Ahmad Badawi
- Deputy: Tiki Lafe
- Preceded by: Zaleha Ismail
- Succeeded by: Maximus Ongkili as Minister of Prime Minister's Department (National Unity and Integration); Shahrizat Abdul Jalil as Minister of Woman, Family and Community Development
- Constituency: Paya Besar

Minister in the Prime Minister's Department
- In office 12 November 1996 – 14 December 1999
- Monarchs: Ja'afar; Salahuddin
- Prime Minister: Mahathir Mohamad
- Deputy: Fauzi Abdul Rahman
- Preceded by: Chong Kah Kiat
- Succeeded by: Bernard Giluk Dompok
- Constituency: Paya Besar

Deputy Minister of Health
- In office 8 May 1995 – 12 November 1996
- Monarch: Ja'afar
- Prime Minister: Mahathir Mohamad
- Minister: Chua Jui Meng
- Preceded by: Mohd Farid Ariffin
- Succeeded by: Mohd Ali Rustam
- Constituency: Paya Besar

Member of the Malaysian Parliament for Paya Besar
- In office 25 April 1995 – 8 March 2008
- Preceded by: Constituency created
- Succeeded by: Abdul Manan Ismail (UMNO–BN)
- Majority: 16,759 (1995); 3,563 (1999); 12,518 (2004)

Women Chief of United Malays National Organisation
- In office 9 October 1996 – 16 January 2000
- President: Mahathir Mohamad
- Preceded by: Rafidah Aziz
- Succeeded by: Rafidah Aziz

Personal details
- Born: Siti Zaharah binti Sulaiman; 24 April 1949 Lanchang, Temerloh, Pahang, Federation of Malaya (now Malaysia)
- Died: 26 July 2024 (aged 75) Kajang, Selangor, Malaysia
- Resting place: Section 21 Muslim Cemetery, Shah Alam, Selangor
- Party: United Malays National Organisation (UMNO)
- Other political affiliations: Barisan Nasional (BN); Perikatan Nasional (PN); Muafakat Nasional (MN)
- Spouse: Samarudin Md Rejab
- Education: University at Albany, SUNY; University of Hawaiʻi at Mānoa; Cornell University
- Occupation: Politician

Siti Zaharah binti Sulaiman (Jawi: سيتي زهرة سليمان; 24 April 1949 – 26 July 2024) was a Malaysian politician. She also was the Minister of National Unity and Community Development, Malaysia. She was Chief of the Women's wing of the United Malays National Organisation (UMNO) from 1996 to 1999. Siti Zaharah also was a member of the parliamentary constituency of Paya Besar, in Pahang for four terms from 1995 to 2008.

== Career ==
During her tenure as Deputy Minister of Health, she officiated the launch of the No Tobacco Month 1998 at Pasar Budaya, Kuala Lumpur on 31 May 1998. Since 1989, 31 May was proclaimed by the World Health Organization (WHO) as World No Tobacco Day.

== UMNO Women's Politics ==
Siti Zaharah was elected to the UMNO Supreme Council of the 2000–2003 session. The 'veiled' image is shocking of UMNO women.

In October 1996, she won the Wanita Umno Chief position defeating Datuk Seri Rafidah Aziz (1984–1996) with a majority of 27 votes. Siti Zaharah's slogan is 'Bringing Changes,' However, she lost to Rafidah Aziz at the UMNO General Assembly 2000. Siti Zaharah became Wanita UMNO chief for 3 years and 7 months. Datuk Seri Shahrizat Abdul Jalil defeated Rafidah in the struggle of the head of the movement at the UMNO General Assembly 2008.

In 2000, a total of 671 female delegates re-elected Rafidah Aziz. Rafidah held the post for 12 years from 1984 to 1996. Rafidah got 341 votes while Siti Zaharah earned 329. Rafidah won with a 12-vote majority excluding one broken vote.

UMNO women managed to create Amanah Saham Wanita (Asnita) and hoped men could set up Amanah Saham Lelaki (Aslaki). With the membership of 2.8 million UMNO members, it is not impossible for 50 percent of Wanita UMNO members to meet the goal of raising RM200 million.

== Elections ==
In 1995, she won the Paya Besar parliamentary seats. In 1999, she won again by beating Wan Jusoh Wan Kolok (PKR). In 2004, he won with a majority of 12,518 votes. Her victory marks 38 of 43 BN women candidates winning in the election. Also winning were Rafidah Aziz (Kuala Kangsar), Datin Paduka Zaleha Ismail (Gombak); Datuk Shahrizat Abdul Jalil (Lembah Pantai); Seripah Noli Syed Husin (Sepang); Senator Mastika Junaidah Husin (Arau); Rosnah Majid (Tanjong Dawai); Ng Yen Yen (Raub); Chew Mei Fun (Petaling Jaya Utara); Komala Krishnamoorthy (Kapar) and Kamala Ganapathy (Kota Raja); Lim Bee Kau (Padang Serai).

On 27 March 2004, Prime Minister Abdullah Ahmad Badawi dropped Siti Zaharah's name from the post of minister.

== Election results ==
Parliament of Malaysia
Year	Constituency	Candidate	Votes	Pct	Opponent(s)	Votes	Pct	Ballots cast	Majority	Turnout
1986	P078 Mentakab	Siti Zaharah Sulaiman (UMNO)	15,271	68.63%	Mohamed Rusdi Arif (PAS)	6,980	31.37%	23,196	8,291	71.59%
1990	P078 Mentakab	Siti Zaharah Sulaiman (UMNO)	17,147	63.44%	Johari Ismail (S46)	9,883	36.56%	28,242	7,264	73.79%
1995	P084 Paya Besar	Siti Zaharah Sulaiman (UMNO)	25,551	74.40%	Wan Abd Rahman Wan Yusoff (S46)	8,792	25.60%	37,221	16,759	78.06%
1999	P084 Paya Besar	Siti Zaharah Sulaiman (UMNO)	20,749	54.70%	Wan Jusoh Wan Kolok (KeADILan)	17,186	45.30%	42,221	3,563	79.24%
2004	P084 Paya Besar	Siti Zaharah Sulaiman (UMNO)	20,474	72.02%	Saari Sungib (PKR)	7,956	27.98%	29,001	12,518	77.46%

== Personal life and death ==
In 2005, she was seriously injured in an accident at Jalan Pintasan Sri Jaya. As a result of the accident, she was warded in the Tengku Ampuan Afzan Hospital Intensive Care Unit, receiving a 10.16 cm stitch on the left side of her head while the Paya Besar UMNO divisional women's wing secretary, Fauziah Abdul Rahman, suffered a crack in the neck.

Zaharah Sulaiman died on 26 July 2024, at the age of 75. She was buried at the Section 21 Muslim Cemetery in Shah Alam, Selangor.

== Honours ==
=== Honours of Malaysia ===
- Malaysia
  - Commander of the Order of Loyalty to the Crown of Malaysia (PSM) – Tan Sri (2017)
- Pahang
  - Knight Grand Companion of the Order of Sultan Ahmad Shah of Pahang (SSAP) – Dato' Sri (2003)
  - Knight Grand Companion of the Order of the Crown of Pahang (SIMP) – formerly Dato', now Dato' Indera (2001)
  - Knight Companion of the Order of Sultan Ahmad Shah of Pahang (DSAP) – Dato' (1995)
  - Knight Companion of the Order of the Crown of Pahang (DIMP) – Dato' (1987)
