= Abdul Manan Ismail =

Malaysian politician (1948–2018)

Yang Hormat Dato' Sri Abdul Manan Ismail SSAP

Member of the Malaysian Parliament for Paya Besar
- In office 8 March 2008 – 12 February 2018
- Preceded by: Siti Zaharah Sulaiman (BN–UMNO)
- Succeeded by: Mohd Shahar Abdullah (BN–UMNO)
- Majority: 8,503 (2008); 7,715 (2013)

Member of the Pahang State Legislative Assembly for Panching
- In office 21 March 2004 – 8 March 2008
- Preceded by: New constituency
- Succeeded by: Mohd Zaili Besar (BN–UMNO)
- Majority: 3,747 (2004)

Personal details
- Born: 28 June 1947 Pahang, Federation of Malaya (now Malaysia)
- Died: 12 February 2018 (aged 70) Taman Melawati, Hulu Kelang, Selangor, Malaysia
- Party: UMNO
- Other political affiliations: Barisan Nasional
- Occupation: Politician

Abdul Manan bin Ismail (28 June 1947 – 12 February 2018) was a Malaysian politician. He was the Member of Parliament for the Paya Besar constituency in Pahang. He is a member of the United Malays National Organisation (UMNO) major component party in the previous governing Barisan Nasional (BN) coalition.

In 2004 general election, he was elected to the Pahang State Legislative Assembly, representing the constituency of Panching.

In the 2008 general election, Abdul Manan contested the Paya Besar parliamentary constituency, replacing former government minister Siti Zaharah Sulaiman as UMNO's nominee for the seat. Abdul Manan won the seat, defeating Mohd Jafri Ab Rashid of the People's Justice Party (PKR) by an 8,503 majority. In 2010 he was appointed chairman of the Intellectual Property Corporation of Malaysia, and in 2013 general election he retained his parliamentary seat with a margin of 7,715 votes.

== Death ==
Abdul Manan died on February 12, 2018, at the age of 71 due to a suspected heart attack after falling in a bathroom.

== Controversy ==
=== 1MDB case ===
On 30 June 2020, High Court judge Mohamed Zaini Mazlan has allowed the prosecution’s application to forfeit at least RM265,000 frozen in a bank account belonging to Abdul Manan, to the Malaysian government. The funds were frozen by the Malaysian Anti-Corruption Commission (MACC) due to links with the 1Malaysia Development Berhad (1MDB) fund scandal. These funds were purportedly disbursed via an Ambank account opened under the name of former prime minister Najib Razak.

== Election results ==
Pahang State Legislative Assembly
Year	Constituency	Candidate	Votes	Pct	Opponent(s)	Votes	Pct	Ballot casts	Majority	Turnout
2004	N19 Panching	Abdul Manan Ismail (UMNO)	7,527	66.57%	Yusof Embong (PAS)	3,780	33.43%	11,487	3,747	79.00%

Parliament of Malaysia
Year	Constituency	Candidate	Votes	Pct	Opponent(s)	Votes	Pct	Ballot casts	Majority	Turnout
2008	P084 Paya Besar	Abdul Manan Ismail (UMNO)	19,355	64.07%	Mohd Jafri Ab Rashid (PKR)	10,852	35.93%	30,888	8,503	77.45%
2013	P084 Paya Besar	Abdul Manan Ismail (UMNO)	23,747	59.29%	Murni Hidayah Anuar (PKR)	16,032	40.03%	40,834	7,715	84.95%
2013	P084 Paya Besar	Abdul Manan Ismail (UMNO)	23,747	59.29%	Zahari Mamat (IND)	272	0.68%	40,834	7,715	84.95%

== Honours ==
- Pahang
  - Knight Companion of the Order of the Crown of Pahang (DIMP) – Dato' (1999)
  - Knight Companion of the Order of Sultan Ahmad Shah of Pahang (DSAP) – Dato' (2013)
  - Grand Knight of the Order of Sultan Ahmad Shah of Pahang (SSAP) – Dato' Sri (2015)
