= Mohamad Shahrum Osman =

Malaysian politician

Yang Berbahagia Dato' Mohamad Shahrum Osman DIMP
- محمد شاهرالروم عثمان

Member of the Malaysian Parliament for Lipis
- In office 21 March 2004 – 5 May 2013
- Preceded by: Amihamzah Ahmad
- Succeeded by: Abdul Rahman Mohamad (BN–UMNO)
- Majority: 7,624 (2004); 4,137 (2008)

Personal details
- Born: 15 July 1953 (age 72) Pahang, Federation of Malaya (now Malaysia)
- Party: Parti Pribumi Bersatu Malaysia (PPBM) (since 2018); United Malays National Organisation (UMNO) (until 2018)
- Other political affiliations: Barisan Nasional (BN) (–2018); Pakatan Harapan (PH) (2018–2020); Perikatan Nasional (PN) (2020–present)
- Occupation: Politician

Mohamad Shahrum bin Osman (born 15 July 1953) was the Member of the Parliament of Malaysia for the Lipis constituency in Pahang from 2004 to 2013. He sat in Parliament as a member of the United Malays National Organisation (UMNO) party in the Barisan Nasional government and also served as the Chairman of the National Higher Education Fund Corporation (PTPTN).

== Election results ==
Parliament of Malaysia
Year	Constituency	Candidate	Votes	Pct	Opponent(s)	Votes	Pct	Ballots cast	Majority	Turnout
2004	P079 Lipis	Mohamad Shahrum Osman (UMNO)	13,870	68.95%	Mohd Zai Mustafa (PAS)	6,246	31.05%	20,875	7,624	74.33%
2008	P079 Lipis	Mohamad Shahrum Osman (UMNO)	12,611	59.81%	Mohamed Nilam (PAS)	8,474	40.19%	21,758	4,137	76.55%
2022	P079 Lipis	Mohamad Shahrum Osman (BERSATU)	11,554	32.22%	Abdul Rahman Mohamad (UMNO)	17,672	49.29%	36,343	6,118	76.09%
2022	P079 Lipis	Mohamad Shahrum Osman (BERSATU)	11,554	32.22%	Tengku Zulpuri Shah Raja Puji (DAP)	6,366	17.75%	36,343	6,118	76.09%
2022	P079 Lipis	Mohamad Shahrum Osman (BERSATU)	11,554	32.22%	Aishaton Abu Bakar (PEJUANG)	263	0.76%	36,343	6,118	76.09%

== Honours ==
- Pahang
  - Knight Companion of the Order of the Crown of Pahang (DIMP) – Dato' (2006)
