= Lipis (federal constituency) =

Federal constituency of Pahang, Malaysia

Lipis (P079)
Pahang constituency

Federal constituency
- Legislature: Dewan Rakyat
- MP: Abdul Rahman Mohamad; BN
- Constituency created: 1958
- First contested: 1959
- Last contested: 2022

Demographics
- Population (2020): 67,853
- Electors (2022): 47,124
- Area (km²): 3,004
- Pop. density (per km²): 22.6

Lipis is a federal constituency in Lipis District, Pahang, Malaysia, that has been represented in the Dewan Rakyat since 1959.

The federal constituency was created in the 1958 redistribution and is mandated to return a single member to the Dewan Rakyat under the first past the post voting system.

== Demographics ==
https://live.chinapress.com.my/ge15/parliament/PAHANG

Ethnic breakdown of Lipis's electorate as of 2022
1. Malay (79.4%)
2. Chinese (14.8%)
3. Indian (5.10%)
4. Other ethnicities (0.70%)

As of 2020, Lipis has a population of 67,853 people.

Age breakdown of Lipis's electorate as of 2022
1. 18-20 (6.02%)
2. 21-29 (22.0%)
3. 30-39 (23.8%)
4. 40-49 (15.6%)
5. 50-59 (13.9%)
6. 60-69 (10.9%)
7. 70-79 (5.24%)
8. 80-89 (2.17%)
9. above 90 (0.45%)
Gender breakdown of Lipis's electorate as of 2022
1. Male (50.9%)
2. Female (49.1%)

== History ==
=== Polling districts ===
According to the federal gazette issued on 31 October 2022, the Lipis constituency is divided into 42 polling districts.

State constituency	Polling district	Code	Location
Padang Tengku (N03)	Merapoh	079/03/01	SK Merapoh
Padang Tengku (N03)	Mentara	079/03/02	SMK Merapoh
Padang Tengku (N03)	Teluk Gunung	079/03/03	SK Teluk Gunung
Padang Tengku (N03)	Kampung Petola	079/03/04	Balai Raya Kampung Petola
Padang Tengku (N03)	Pagar Sasak	079/03/05	SK Pagar Sasak
Padang Tengku (N03)	FELDA Sungai Kechau	079/03/06	SK LKTP Kecau 1
Padang Tengku (N03)	Ladang Selborne	079/03/07	SJK (T) Ladang Selborne
Padang Tengku (N03)	Padang Tengku	079/03/08	SMK Padang Tengku
Padang Tengku (N03)	Gua	079/03/09	SK Gua
Padang Tengku (N03)	Tempoyong	079/03/10	Dewan Orang Ramai Kampung Tempoyong
Padang Tengku (N03)	Bapong	079/03/11	Balai Raya Kampung Bapong
Padang Tengku (N03)	Relong	079/03/12	SK Relong
Padang Tengku (N03)	Berchang	079/03/13	SK Berchang
Padang Tengku (N03)	Telang	079/03/14	SK Kuala Telang
Padang Tengku (N03)	Seberang Jelai	079/03/15	Balai Raya Kampung Seberang Jelai
Padang Tengku (N03)	Kechur	079/03/16	SK Kechor Tui
Padang Tengku (N03)	Aur Gading	079/03/17	SK Aur Geding
Padang Tengku (N03)	Chegar Perah	079/03/18	SK Chegar Perah
Padang Tengku (N03)	Sungai Temau	079/03/19	SK (LKTP) Chegar Perah
Cheka (N04)	Kuala Lanar	079/04/01	SK Kuala Lanar
Cheka (N04)	Kuala Kenong	079/04/02	SK Batu 9
Cheka (N04)	Mela	079/04/03	SK Mela
Cheka (N04)	Kerambit	079/04/04	SK Kerambit
Cheka (N04)	Kampung Baru Penjom	079/04/05	SJK (C) Penjom
Cheka (N04)	Penjom	079/04/06	SK Penjom
Cheka (N04)	Cheneras	079/04/07	SK Clifford
Cheka (N04)	Sungai Kerpan	079/04/08	SJK (C) Chung Hwa
Cheka (N04)	Batu Kurap	079/04/09	Tadika Kekwa
Cheka (N04)	Bandar Lipis	079/04/10	SMK Clifford
Cheka (N04)	Bukit Bius	079/04/11	SK Wan Ibrahim
Benta (N05)	Kampung Lalang	079/05/01	Balai Raya Kampung Lalang
Benta (N05)	Rengai	079/05/02	Kolej Vokesional Sultan Haji Ahmad Shah Al-Musta'in Billag
Benta (N05)	Tanjung Besar	079/05/03	SK Tanjung Besar
Benta (N05)	Jeransang	079/05/04	SK Jeransang
Benta (N05)	Kemahang	079/05/05	SK Kemahang
Benta (N05)	Kampung Chat	079/05/06	SK Chat
Benta (N05)	Budu	079/05/07	SMK Panglima Garang Abdul Samad
Benta (N05)	Pekan Benta	079/05/08	SK Benta
Benta (N05)	Kampung Baru Benta	079/05/09	SMK Benta
Benta (N05)	Jerkoh	079/05/10	SJK (C) Jerkoh
Benta (N05)	Ladang Benta	079/05/11	SJK (T) Ladang Benta
Benta (N05)	Ladang Budu	079/05/12	SJK (T) Ladang Budu

=== Representation history ===
Members of Parliament for Lipis
Parliament	No	Years	Member	Party	Vote Share
Constituency created from Ulu Pahang
Parliament of the Federation of Malaya
1st	P064	1959–1962	Mohamed Sulong Mohd Ali (محمد سولوڠ محمد علي)	Alliance (UMNO)	11,694; 75.39%
1st	P064	1962–1963	Abdul Razak Hussin (عبدالرازق حسين)	Alliance (UMNO)	12,191; 63.98%
Parliament of Malaysia
1st	P064	1963–1964	Abdul Razak Hussin (عبدالرازق حسين)	Alliance (UMNO)	12,191; 63.98%
2nd	P064	1964–1969	Abdul Razak Hussin (عبدالرازق حسين)	Alliance (UMNO)	15,294; 77.58%
		1969–1971	Parliament was suspended		
3rd	P064	1971–1972	Abdul Razak Hussin (عبدالرازق حسين)	Alliance (UMNO)	14,862; 68.94%
3rd	P064	1972–1973	Ghazali Shafie (غزالي شافعي)	Alliance (UMNO)	15,702; 81.33%
3rd	P064	1973–1974	Ghazali Shafie (غزالي شافعي)	BN (UMNO)	15,702; 81.33%
4th	P065	1974–1978	Ghazali Shafie (غزالي شافعي)	BN (UMNO)	Uncontested
5th	P065	1978–1982	Ghazali Shafie (غزالي شافعي)	BN (UMNO)	14,778; 69.92%
6th	P065	1982–1986	Ghazali Shafie (غزالي شافعي)	BN (UMNO)	15,094; 61.07%
7th	P072	1986–1990	Wang Choon Wing (黄循营)	BN (MCA)	13,533; 60.45%
8th	P072	1990–1995	Chan Kong Choy (陈广才)	BN (MCA)	15,170; 57.64%
9th	P075	1995–1997	Abu Dahari Osman (ابو داهاري عثمان)	BN (UMNO)	18,507; 58.80%
9th	P075	1997–1999	Amihamzah Ahmad (اميحمزه احمد)	BN (UMNO)	Uncontested
10th	P075	1999–2004	Amihamzah Ahmad (اميحمزه احمد)	BN (UMNO)	16,916; 61.57%
11th	P079	2004–2008	Mohamad Shahrum Osman (محمد شاهرالروم عثمان)	BN (UMNO)	13,870; 68.95%
12th	P079	2008–2013	Mohamad Shahrum Osman (محمد شاهرالروم عثمان)	BN (UMNO)	12,611; 59.81%
13th	P079	2013–2018	Abdul Rahman Mohamad (عبدالرحمن محمد)	BN (UMNO)	14,863; 55.96%
14th	P079	2018–2022	Abdul Rahman Mohamad (عبدالرحمن محمد)	BN (UMNO)	13,995; 49.82%
15th	P079	2022–present	Abdul Rahman Mohamad (عبدالرحمن محمد)	BN (UMNO)	17,672; 49.29%

=== State constituency ===
Parliamentary constituency	State constituency						
Parliamentary constituency	1955–59*	1959–1974	1974–1986	1986–1995	1995–2004	2004–2018	2018–present
Lipis			Bandar Lipis				
Lipis			Benta			Benta	
Lipis			Bukit Betong				
Lipis				Bukit Betung			
Lipis					Cameron Highlands		
Lipis				Ceka			
Lipis						Cheka	
Lipis		Jelai					
Lipis		Jerantut					
Lipis		Kuala Lipis					
Lipis					Padang Tengku		
Lipis			Tanah Rata				
Lipis		Tanjong Besar					

=== Historical boundaries ===
State Constituency	Area					
State Constituency	1959	1974	1984	1994	2003	2018
Bandar Lipis		Kampung Binjai; Kuala Lanar; Kuala Lipis; Penjom; Simpang Panggung				
Benta		Benta; Bukit Tajam; Jerkoh; Kampung Chat; Kampung Sama			Benta; Jeransang; Kampung Lalang; Kemahang; Tanjung Besar	
Bukit Betong		Bukit Betong; Kampung Aur Gading; Kampung Sungai Ular; Kampung Telang; Padang Tengku	Bukit Betong; Kampung Aur Gading; Kampung Sungai Ular; Kuala Lipis; Padang Tengku			
Cameron Highlands				Brinchang; Kampung Raja; Ringlet; Tanah Rata; Tringkap		
Cheka			Cheka; Kampung Kuala Kenong; Mela; Penjom; Simpang Panggung	Cheka; Kampung Kuala Kenong; Kuala Lipis; Mela; Penjom		
Jelai	Bukit Betong; FELDA Chegar Parah 1 & 2; Merapoh; Padang Tengku; Tembeling	Betau; FELDA Chegar Parah 1 & 2; Merapoh; Pos Lemoi; Sungai Koyan		Betau; Jelai; Pos Lemoi; Pos Telimau; Sungai Koyan		
Jerantut	FELDA Jengka 24; FELDA Kota Gelanggi 1-4; FELDA Sungai Tekam; Jerantut; Pulau Tawar					
Kuala Lipis	Kampung Binjai; Kuala Lanar; Kuala Lipis; Penjom; Simpang Panggung					
Padang Tengku				FELDA Chegar Perah 1 & 2; FELDA Sungai Kechau; Kampung Aur Gading; Merapoh; Padang Tengku		
Tanah Rata		Brinchang; Kampung Raja; Ringlet; Tanah Rata; Tringkap				
Tanjong Besar	Benta; Damak; Tanjong Besar; Kuala Kenong; Mela					

=== Current state assembly members ===
No.	State Constituency	Member	Coalition (Party)
N03	Padang Tengku	Mustapa Long	BN (UMNO)
N04	Cheka	Tuan Ibrahim Tuan Man	PN (PAS)
N05	Benta	Mohd. Soffi Abd. Razak	BN (UMNO)

=== Local governments & postcodes ===
No.	State Constituency	Local Government	Postcode
N03	Padang Tengku	Lipis District Council	27100 Padang Tengku; 27200, 27210 Kuala Lipis; 27300, 27310 Benta
N04	Cheka	Lipis District Council	27100 Padang Tengku; 27200, 27210 Kuala Lipis; 27300, 27310 Benta
N05	Benta	Lipis District Council	27100 Padang Tengku; 27200, 27210 Kuala Lipis; 27300, 27310 Benta

== Election results ==
Malaysian general election, 2022
Party	Candidate	Votes	%	∆%
BN	Abdul Rahman Mohamad	17,672	49.29	▼0.53
PN	Mohamad Shahrum Osman	11,554	32.22	▲32.22
PH	Tengku Zulpuri Shah Raja Puji	6,366	17.75	▲17.75
PEJUANG	Aishaton Abu Bakar	263	0.76	▲0.76
Total valid votes		35,855	100.00	
Total rejected ballots		388		
Unreturned ballots		100		
Turnout		36,343	76.09	▼5.13
Registered electors		47,124		
Majority		6,118	17.07	▼6.31
BN hold		Swing		
Source(s) https://lom.agc.gov.my/ilims/upload/portal/akta/outputp/1753278/PUB611_2022.pdf

Malaysian general election, 2018
Party	Candidate	Votes	%	∆%
BN	Abdul Rahman Mohamad	13,995	49.82	▼6.14
PKR	Badarudin Abd Rahaman	7,426	26.43	▲26.43
PAS	Sobirin Duli	6,671	23.75	▼19.15
Total valid votes		28,092	100.00	
Total rejected ballots		462		
Unreturned ballots		112		
Turnout		28,666	81.22	▼2.70
Registered electors		35,294		
Majority		6,569	23.38	▲10.32
BN hold		Swing		
Source(s) "His Majesty's Government Gazette - Notice of Contested Election, Parliament for the State of Pahang [P.U. (B) 238/2018]" (PDF). Attorney General's Chambers of Malaysia. 3 May 2018. "Federal Government Gazette - Results of Contested Election and Statements of the Poll after the Official Addition of Votes, Parliamentary Constituencies for the State of Pahang [P.U. (B) 312/2018]" (PDF). Attorney General's Chambers of Malaysia. 28 May 2018.

Malaysian general election, 2013
Party	Candidate	Votes	%	∆%
BN	Abdul Rahman Mohamad	14,863	55.96	▼3.85
PAS	Mohd Mahyuddin Ghazal @ Razali	11,394	42.90	▲2.71
Independent	Aishaton Abu Bakar	303	1.14	▲1.14
Total valid votes		26,560	100.00	
Total rejected ballots		426		
Unreturned ballots		140		
Turnout		27,126	83.92	▲7.37
Registered electors		32,324		
Majority		3,469	13.06	▼6.56
BN hold		Swing		
Source(s) "Federal Government Gazette - Notice of Contested Election, Parliament for the State of Pahang [P.U. (B) 175/2013]" (PDF). Attorney General's Chambers of Malaysia. 26 April 2013. "Federal Government Gazette - Results of Contested Election and Statements of the Poll after the Official Addition of Votes, Parliamentary Constituencies for the State of Pahang [P.U. (B) 216/2013]" (PDF). Attorney General's Chambers of Malaysia. 22 May 2013. Archived from the original (PDF) on 2019-07-01.

Malaysian general election, 2008
Party	Candidate	Votes	%	∆%
BN	Mohamad Shahrum Osman	12,611	59.81	▼9.14
PAS	Mohamed Nilam Abdul Manap	8,474	40.19	▲9.14
Total valid votes		21,085	100.00	
Total rejected ballots		561		
Unreturned ballots		112		
Turnout		21,758	76.55	▲2.22
Registered electors		28,425		
Majority		4,137	19.62	▼18.28
BN hold		Swing		

Malaysian general election, 2004
Party	Candidate	Votes	%	∆%
BN	Mohamad Shahrum Osman	13,870	68.95	▲7.38
PAS	Mohamad Zai Mustafa	6,246	31.05	▼7.38
Total valid votes		20,116	100.00	
Total rejected ballots		528		
Unreturned ballots		231		
Turnout		20,875	74.33	▲7.33
Registered electors		28,084		
Majority		7,624	37.90	▲14.76
BN hold		Swing		

Malaysian general election, 1999
Party	Candidate	Votes	%	∆%
BN	Amihamzah Ahmad	16,916	61.57	▲61.57
PAS	Kamaludin Abd. Rahman	10,560	38.43	▲38.43
Total valid votes		27,476	100.00	
Total rejected ballots		860		
Unreturned ballots		196		
Turnout		28,532	67.00	
Registered electors		42,585		
Majority		6,356	23.14	
BN hold		Swing		

Malaysian general by-election, 27 January 1996 Upon the death of incumbent, Abu Dahari Osman
Party	Candidate	Votes	%	∆%
On the nomination day, Amihamzah Ahmad won uncontested.
BN	Amihamzah Ahmad			
Total valid votes			100.00	
Total rejected ballots				
Unreturned ballots				
Turnout				
Registered electors				
Majority				
BN hold		Swing		

Malaysian general election, 1995
Party	Candidate	Votes	%	∆%
BN	Abu Dahari Osman	18,507	68.80	▲11.16
S46	Ahd Shabery Cheek	8,394	31.20	▼11.16
Total valid votes		26,901	100.00	
Total rejected ballots		1,859		
Unreturned ballots		251		
Turnout		29,011	68.49	▼1.88
Registered electors		42,358		
Majority		10,113	37.60	▲22.32
BN hold		Swing		

Malaysian general election, 1990
Party	Candidate	Votes	%	∆%
BN	Chan Kong Choy	15,170	57.64	▼2.81
S46	Amin Hussaini Abdul Manan	11,148	42.36	▲42.36
Total valid votes		26,318	100.00	
Total rejected ballots		1,144		
Unreturned ballots		0		
Turnout		27,462	70.37	▲4.54
Registered electors		39,027		
Majority		4,022	15.28	▼22.47
BN hold		Swing		

Malaysian general election, 1986
Party	Candidate	Votes	%	∆%
BN	Wang Choon Wing	13,533	60.45	▼0.62
PAS	Solahuddin Mohd Ali	5,081	22.70	▲0.54
DAP	Woo Chee Wan	3,773	16.85	▼5.31
Total valid votes		22,387	100.00	
Total rejected ballots		906		
Unreturned ballots		0		
Turnout		23,293	65.83	▼4.91
Registered electors		35,385		
Majority		8,452	37.75	▼1.16
BN hold		Swing		

Malaysian general election, 1982
Party	Candidate	Votes	%	∆%
BN	Ghazali Shafie	15,094	61.07	▼8.85
DAP	S. Nadarajan	5,477	22.16	▲22.16
PAS	Zaharin Muhamad	4,145	16.77	▲1.64
Total valid votes		24,716	100.00	
Total rejected ballots		987		
Unreturned ballots		0		
Turnout		25,703	70.74	▼1.68
Registered electors		36,337		
Majority		9,617	38.91	▼15.88
BN hold		Swing		

Malaysian general election, 1978
Party	Candidate	Votes	%	∆%
BN	Ghazali Shafie	14,778	69.92	▲69.92
PAS	Kasim Yahya	3,199	15.13	▼15.13
Independent	Wan Abdul Rahman Wan Ibrahim	3,160	14.95	▲14.95
Total valid votes		21,137	100.00	
Total rejected ballots		1,308		
Unreturned ballots		0		
Turnout		22,445	72.42	
Registered electors		30,992		
Majority		11,579	54.79	
BN hold		Swing		

Malaysian general election, 1974
Party	Candidate	Votes	%	∆%
On the nomination day, Ghazali Shafie won uncontested.
BN	Ghazali Shafie			
Total valid votes			100.00	
Total rejected ballots				
Unreturned ballots				
Turnout				
Registered electors		27,363		
Majority				
BN gain from Alliance Party (Malaysia) Party (Malaysia)		Swing		?

Malaysian general by-election, 8 April 1972 Upon the resignation of incumbent, Abdul Razak Hussin
Party	Candidate	Votes	%	∆%
Alliance	Ghazali Shafie	15,702	81.33	▲12.39
PMIP	Tengku Kamarulzaman Tengku Hamid	3,605	18.67	▼12.39
Total valid votes		19,307	100.00	
Total rejected ballots				
Unreturned ballots				
Turnout				
Registered electors		22,600		
Majority		12,097	62.66	▲24.78
Alliance hold		Swing		

Malaysian general election, 1969
Party	Candidate	Votes	%	∆%
Alliance	Abdul Razak Hussin	14,862	68.94	▼8.64
PMIP	Sulaiman Sidek	6,696	31.06	▲8.64
Total valid votes		21,558	100.00	
Total rejected ballots		1,836		
Unreturned ballots		0		
Turnout		23,394	72.23	▼3.77
Registered electors		32,390		
Majority		8,166	37.88	▼17.28
Alliance hold		Swing		

Malaysian general election, 1964
Party	Candidate	Votes	%	∆%
Alliance	Abdul Razak Hussin	15,294	77.58	▲13.60
PMIP	Nik Ahmad Nik Man	4,421	22.42	▲5.80
Total valid votes		19,715	100.00	
Total rejected ballots		1,221		
Unreturned ballots		0		
Turnout		20,936	76.00	▼1.06
Registered electors		27,546		
Majority		10,873	55.16	▲10.58
Alliance hold		Swing		

Malaysian general by-election, 20 October 1962 Upon the death of incumbent, Mohamed Sulong Mohd. Ali
Party	Candidate	Votes	%	∆%
Alliance	Abdul Razak Hussin	12,191	63.98	▼11.41
Socialist Front	Mohamed Nazar Nong	3,698	19.40	▲19.40
PMIP	Hussain Hijau	3,166	16.62	▼7.99
Total valid votes		19,055	100.00	
Total rejected ballots		322		
Unreturned ballots		0		
Turnout		19,377	74.94	▲1.42
Registered electors		25,856		
Majority		8,493	44.58	▼6.20
Alliance hold		Swing		

Malayan general election, 1959
Party	Candidate	Votes	%
Alliance	Mohamed Sulong Mohd. Ali	11,694	75.39
PMIP	Abdul Hamid Abdullah	3,818	24.61
Total valid votes		15,512	100.00
Total rejected ballots		197	
Unreturned ballots		0	
Turnout		15,709	73.52
Registered electors		21,634	
Majority		7,876	50.78
This was a new constituency created.
