= 1962 Lipis by-election =

Malaysian election

- 20 October 1962

P064 Lipis seat in the Dewan Rakyat
- Turnout: 19,377
	First party	Second party	Third party
	All	SF	PMIP
Candidate	Abdul Razak Hussin	Nazar Nong	Hussain Hijau
Party	UMNO	PRM	PMIP
Alliance	Alliance	SF
Popular vote	12,191	3,698	3,166
Percentage	63.98%	19.40%	16.62%
MP before election
Mohamed Sulong Mohd. Ali
Alliance (UMNO)
Elected MP
Abdul Razak Hussin
Alliance (UMNO)

The Lipis by-election is a parliamentary by-election that was held on 20 October 1962 in the state of Pahang in the Federation of Malaya. The Lipis seat fell vacant following the death of its member of parliament Mr. Mohamed Sulong Mohd. Ali of Alliance. He won the seat in 1959 Malayan general election with 7,878 majority.

Abdul Razak Hussin of Alliance, won the by election, defeating Nazar Nong of SF and Hussain Hijau of PMIP with an increased majority of 8,493 votes. The constituency had 25,856 voters.

== Nomination ==
Alliance nominated Pahang State Supervisor of Adult Education, Abdul Razak Hussin. SF nominated Selangor State Assemblymen, Nazar Nong while PMIP nominated party commissioner for West Pahang, Hussain Hijau.

Razak and Nazar were both cousins and descendants of Pahang Malay warrior who fought against British.

== Results ==
Malaysian general by-election, 20 October 1962: Lipis Upon the death of incumbent, Mohamed Sulong Mohd. Ali
Party	Candidate	Votes	%	∆%
Alliance	Abdul Razak Hussin	12,191	63.98	▼11.41
Socialist Front	Mohamed Nazar Nong	3,698	19.40	▲19.40
PMIP	Hussain Hijau	3,166	16.62	▼7.99
Total valid votes		19,055	100.00	
Total rejected ballots		322		
Unreturned ballots		0		
Turnout		19,377	74.94	▲1.42
Registered electors		25,856		
Majority		8,493	44.58	▼6.20
Alliance hold		Swing		
