= Paya Besar (federal constituency) =

Federal constituency of Pahang, Malaysia

Paya Besar (P084)
Pahang constituency

Federal constituency
- Legislature: Dewan Rakyat
- MP: Mohd Shahar Abdullah; BN
- Constituency created: 1994
- First contested: 1995
- Last contested: 2022

Demographics
- Population (2020): 128,041
- Electors (2022): 79,744
- Area (km²): 2,218
- Pop. density (per km²): 57.7

Paya Besar is a federal constituency in Kuantan District, Pahang, Malaysia, that has been represented in the Dewan Rakyat since 1995.

The federal constituency was created in the 1994 redistribution and is mandated to return a single member to the Dewan Rakyat under the first past the post voting system.

== Demographics ==
Ethnic breakdown of Paya Besar's electorate as of 2022
1. Malay (84.0%)
2. Chinese (11.1%)
3. Other ethnicities (3.10%)
4. Indian (1.90%)

As of 2020, Paya Besar has a population of 128,041 people.

Age breakdown of Paya Besar's electorate as of 2022
1. 18-20 (7.26%)
2. 21-29 (22.9%)
3. 30-39 (24.7%)
4. 40-49 (16.9%)
5. 50-59 (12.7%)
6. 60-69 (9.73%)
7. 70-79 (4.50%)
8. 80-89 (1.18%)
9. above 90 (0.17%)
Gender breakdown of Paya Besar's electorate as of 2022
1. Male (49.7%)
2. Female (50.3%)

== History ==
=== Polling districts ===
According to the federal gazette issued on 30 October 2022, the Paya Besar constituency is divided into 24 polling districts.

| State constituency | Polling districts | Code | Location |
|---|---|---|---|
| Sungai Lembing (N17) | Kampung Nadak | 084/17/01 | SK Nadak |
| Sungai Lembing (N17) | Pekan Sungai Lembing | 084/17/02 | SMK Sungai Lembing |
| Sungai Lembing (N17) | Kuala Kenau | 084/17/03 | SK Sungai Lembing |
| Sungai Lembing (N17) | FELDA Bukit Sagu | 084/17/04 | SK LKTP Bukit Sagu 1; SMK Bukit Sagu |
| Sungai Lembing (N17) | FELDA Bukit Kuantan | 084/17/05 | SK LKTP Bukit Kuantan |
| Sungai Lembing (N17) | FELDA Bukit Goh | 084/17/06 | SMK Bukit Goh; SK Bukit Goh |
| Sungai Lembing (N17) | Bukit Kuin | 084/17/07 | SK Bukit Kuin |
| Lepar (N18) | Mahkota Jaya | 084/18/01 | SK Seri Mahkota; SA Rakyat (KAFA) Nurul Aman |
| Lepar (N18) | Seri Fajar | 084/18/02 | SK Gambang |
| Lepar (N18) | Gambang | 084/18/03 | SJK (C) Gambang |
| Lepar (N18) | Jalan Besar | 084/18/04 | Dewan Orang Ramai Gambang |
| Lepar (N18) | FELDA Lepar Hilir Satu | 084/18/05 | SK LKTP Lepar Hilir 1 |
| Lepar (N18) | FELDA Lepar Hilir Dua | 084/18/06 | SK LKTP Lepar Hilir 2 |
| Lepar (N18) | FELDA Lepar Hilir Tiga | 084/18/07 | SK LKTP Lepar Hilir 3 |
| Lepar (N18) | Paya Bungor | 084/18/08 | SK Paya Bungor |
| Lepar (N18) | FELDA Lepar Utara Satu | 084/18/09 | SMK Lepar Utara |
| Panching (N19) | Bukit Rangin | 084/19/01 | SMK Bukit Rangin |
| Panching (N19) | Kampung Permatang Badak | 084/19/02 | SK Permatang Badak |
| Panching (N19) | Pandan Permai | 084/19/03 | SMK Padang Garuda |
| Panching (N19) | Taman Tas | 084/19/04 | SMK Pandan |
| Panching (N19) | FELDA Sungai Panching Selatan | 084/19/05 | SK LKTP Sungai Panching Selatan |
| Panching (N19) | FELDA Sungai Panching Timur | 084/19/06 | SK LKTP Sungai Panching Timur |
| Panching (N19) | FELDA Sungai Panching Utara | 084/19/07 | SK LKTP Sungai Panching Utara |
| Panching (N19) | Kampung Panching | 084/19/08 | SK Panching |

=== Representation history ===
Members of Parliament for Paya Besar
| Parliament | No | Years | Member | Party | Vote Share |
Constituency created from Kuantan, Maran and Pekan
| 9th | P079 | 1995–1999 | Siti Zaharah Sulaiman (سيتي زهرة سليمان) | BN (UMNO) | 25,551; 74.40% |
| 10th | P079 | 1999–2004 | Siti Zaharah Sulaiman (سيتي زهرة سليمان) | BN (UMNO) | 20,749; 54.70% |
| 11th | P084 | 2004–2008 | Siti Zaharah Sulaiman (سيتي زهرة سليمان) | BN (UMNO) | 20,474; 72.02% |
| 12th | P084 | 2008–2013 | Abdul Manan Ismail (عبدالمانن اسماعيل) | BN (UMNO) | 19,355; 64.07% |
| 13th | P084 | 2013–2018 | Abdul Manan Ismail (عبدالمانن اسماعيل) | BN (UMNO) | 23,747; 59.29% |
| 13th | P084 | 2018 | Vacant | | |
| 14th | P084 | 2018–2022 | Mohd Shahar Abdullah (محمد شاهر عبدﷲ) | BN (UMNO) | 19,033; 43.16% |
| 15th | P084 | 2022–present | Mohd Shahar Abdullah (محمد شاهر عبدﷲ) | BN (UMNO) | 26,899; 43.40% |

=== State constituency ===
| Parliamentary constituency | State constituency | | | | | | |
| Parliamentary constituency | 1955–59* | 1959–1974 | 1974–1986 | 1986–1995 | 1995–2004 | 2004–2018 | 2018–present |
|---|---|---|---|---|---|---|---|
| Paya Besar | | | | | Lepar | | |
| Paya Besar | | | | | | Panching | |
| Paya Besar | | | | | Penur | | |
| Paya Besar | | | | | Sungai Lembing | | |

=== Historical boundaries ===
| State Constituency | Area | | |
| State Constituency | 1994 | 2003 | 2018 |
|---|---|---|---|
| Lepar | FELDA Lepar Hilir 1-3; Gambang; Kampung Orang Asli Batu 14; Paya Bungor; Seri Mahkota | | |
| Panching | | Bukit Rangin; FELDA Sungai Panching Selatan; FELDA Sungai Panching Utara; Panching; Pasir Kemudi | |
| Penur | Bukit Rangin; FELDA Sungai Panching Selatan; FELDA Sungai Panching Utara; Indera Sempurna; Kampung Batu Putih | | |
| Sungai Lembing | Bukit Kuin; FELDA Bukit Goh; FELDA Bukit Kuantan; FELDA Bukit Sagu; Sungai Lembing | | |

=== Current state assembly members ===
| No. | State Constituency | Member | Coalition (Party) |
|---|---|---|---|
| N17 | Sungai Lembing | Mohamad Ayub Asri | PN (PAS) |
| N18 | Lepar | Mohd Yazid Mohd Yunus | PN (BERSATU) |
| N19 | Panching | Mohd Tarmizi Yahaya | PN (PAS) |

=== Local governments & postcodes ===
| No. | State Constituency | Local Government | Postcode |
|---|---|---|---|
| N17 | Sungai Lembing | Kuantan City Council | 25150, 26010, 26040, 26070, 26090, 26140, 26180 Kuantan; 26050 Bukit Goh; 26200 Sungai Lembing; 26250 Jaya Gading; 26300 Gambang |
| N18 | Lepar | Kuantan City Council | 25150, 26010, 26040, 26070, 26090, 26140, 26180 Kuantan; 26050 Bukit Goh; 26200 Sungai Lembing; 26250 Jaya Gading; 26300 Gambang |
| N19 | Panching | Kuantan City Council | 25150, 26010, 26040, 26070, 26090, 26140, 26180 Kuantan; 26050 Bukit Goh; 26200 Sungai Lembing; 26250 Jaya Gading; 26300 Gambang |

== Election results ==
Malaysian general election, 2022
| Party | Candidate | Votes | % | ∆% |
|---|---|---|---|---|
| BN | Mohd Shahar Abdullah | 26,899 | 43.40 | ▲0.24 |
| PN | Aireroshairi Roslan | 25,582 | 41.27 | ▲41.27 |
| PH | Ahmad Azam Mohd Salleh | 9,192 | 14.83 | ▲14.83 |
| PEJUANG | Rosminahar Mohd Amin | 310 | 0.50 | ▲0.50 |
| Total valid votes | | 61,983 | 100.00 | |
| Total rejected ballots | | 678 | | |
| Unreturned ballots | | 107 | | |
| Turnout | | 62,768 | 78.71 | ▼2.80 |
| Registered electors | | 79,744 | | |
| Majority | | 1,317 | 2.13 | ▼10.89 |
| BN hold | | Swing | | |
Source(s) https://lom.agc.gov.my/ilims/upload/portal/akta/outputp/1753278/PUB611_2022.pdf

Malaysian general election, 2018
| Party | Candidate | Votes | % | ∆% |
|---|---|---|---|---|
| BN | Mohd Shahar Abdullah | 19,033 | 43.16 | ▼16.13 |
| PAS | Mohamad Azhar Mohd Noor | 13,291 | 30.14 | ▲30.14 |
| PKR | Mohd Ashraf Mustaqim Badrul Munir | 11,776 | 26.70 | ▼13.33 |
| Total valid votes | | 44,100 | 100.00 | |
| Total rejected ballots | | 671 | | |
| Unreturned ballots | | 171 | | |
| Turnout | | 44,942 | 81.51 | ▼3.44 |
| Registered electors | | 55,135 | | |
| Majority | | 5,742 | 13.02 | ▼6.24 |
| BN hold | | Swing | | |
Source(s) "His Majesty's Government Gazette - Notice of Contested Election, Parliament for the State of Pahang [P.U. (B) 238/2018]" (PDF). Attorney General's Chambers of Malaysia. 3 May 2018. "Federal Government Gazette - Results of Contested Election and Statements of the Poll after the Official Addition of Votes, Parliamentary Constituencies for the State of Pahang [P.U. (B) 312/2018]" (PDF). Attorney General's Chambers of Malaysia. 28 May 2018.

Malaysian general election, 2013
| Party | Candidate | Votes | % | ∆% |
|---|---|---|---|---|
| BN | Abdul Manan Ismail | 23,747 | 59.29 | ▼4.78 |
| PKR | Murnie Hidayah Anuar | 16,032 | 40.03 | ▲4.10 |
| Independent | Zahari Mamat | 272 | 0.68 | ▲0.68 |
| Total valid votes | | 40,051 | 100.00 | |
| Total rejected ballots | | 643 | | |
| Unreturned ballots | | 140 | | |
| Turnout | | 40,834 | 84.95 | ▲7.50 |
| Registered electors | | 48,067 | | |
| Majority | | 7,715 | 19.26 | ▼8.88 |
| BN hold | | Swing | | |
Source(s) "Federal Government Gazette - Notice of Contested Election, Parliament for the State of Pahang [P.U. (B) 175/2013]" (PDF). Attorney General's Chambers of Malaysia. 26 April 2013. "Federal Government Gazette - Results of Contested Election and Statements of the Poll after the Official Addition of Votes, Parliamentary Constituencies for the State of Pahang [P.U. (B) 216/2013]" (PDF). Attorney General's Chambers of Malaysia. 22 May 2013. Archived from the original (PDF) on 1 July 2019.

Malaysian general election, 2008
| Party | Candidate | Votes | % | ∆% |
|---|---|---|---|---|
| BN | Abdul Manan Ismail | 19,355 | 64.07 | ▼7.95 |
| PKR | Mohd Jafri Ab Rashid | 10,852 | 35.93 | ▲7.95 |
| Total valid votes | | 30,207 | 100.00 | |
| Total rejected ballots | | 637 | | |
| Unreturned ballots | | 44 | | |
| Turnout | | 30,888 | 77.45 | ▼0.01 |
| Registered electors | | 39,882 | | |
| Majority | | 8,503 | 28.14 | ▼15.90 |
| BN hold | | Swing | | |

Malaysian general election, 2004
| Party | Candidate | Votes | % | ∆% |
|---|---|---|---|---|
| BN | Siti Zaharah Sulaiman | 20,474 | 72.02 | ▲17.32 |
| PKR | Saari Sungib | 7,956 | 27.98 | ▼17.32 |
| Total valid votes | | 28,430 | 100.00 | |
| Total rejected ballots | | 564 | | |
| Unreturned ballots | | 7 | | |
| Turnout | | 29,001 | 77.46 | ▼1.78 |
| Registered electors | | 37,439 | | |
| Majority | | 12,518 | 44.04 | ▲34.64 |
| BN hold | | Swing | | |

Malaysian general election, 1999
| Party | Candidate | Votes | % | ∆% |
|---|---|---|---|---|
| BN | Siti Zaharah Sulaiman | 20,749 | 54.70 | ▼19.70 |
| PKR | Wan Jusoh Wan Kolok | 17,186 | 45.30 | ▲45.30 |
| Total valid votes | | 37,935 | 100.00 | |
| Total rejected ballots | | 1,553 | | |
| Unreturned ballots | | 2,733 | | |
| Turnout | | 42,221 | 79.24 | ▲1.18 |
| Registered electors | | 53,282 | | |
| Majority | | 3,563 | 9.40 | ▼39.40 |
| BN hold | | Swing | | |

Malaysian general election, 1995
| Party | Candidate | Votes | % |
|---|---|---|---|
| BN | Siti Zaharah Sulaiman | 25,551 | 74.40 |
| S46 | Wan Abdul Rahman Wan Yusoff | 8,792 | 25.60 |
| Total valid votes | | 34,343 | 100.00 |
| Total rejected ballots | | 1,536 | |
| Unreturned ballots | | 1,342 | |
| Turnout | | 37,221 | 78.06 |
| Registered electors | | 47,682 | |
| Majority | | 16,759 | 48.80 |
This was a new constituency created.
