= Mukah (federal constituency) =

Federal constituency of Sarawak, Malaysia

Mukah (P213)
Sarawak constituency

Federal constituency
- Legislature: Dewan Rakyat
- MP: Hanifah Hajar Taib; GPS
- Constituency created: 1968
- First contested: 1969
- Last contested: 2022

Demographics
- Population (2020): 60,805
- Electors (2022): 46,964
- Area (km²): 2,985
- Pop. density (per km²): 20.4

Mukah is a federal constituency in Mukah Division (Mukah District & Dalat District), Sarawak, Malaysia, that has been represented in the Dewan Rakyat since 1971.

The federal constituency was created in the 1968 redistribution and is mandated to return a single member to the Dewan Rakyat under the first past the post voting system.

== Demographics ==
https://ge15.orientaldaily.com.my/seats/sarawak/p

Ethnic breakdown of Mukah's electorate as of 2022
1. Sarawak bumiputera 67.6 (63.8%)
2. Malay-Muslim bumiputera 27.9 (26.3%)
3. Chinese 9.6 (9.06%)
4. Other ethnicities 0.9 (0.85%)

As of 2020, Mukah has a population of 60,805 people.

Age breakdown of Mukah's electorate as of 2022
1. 18-20 (6.66%)
2. 21-29 (21.8%)
3. 30-39 (20.7%)
4. 40-49 (16.9%)
5. 50-59 (15.7%)
6. 60-69 (10.8%)
7. 70-79 (5.61%)
8. 80-89 (1.49%)
9. above 90 (0.34%)
Gender breakdown of Mukah's electorate as of 2022
1. Male (50.6%)
2. Female (49.4%)

== History ==
=== Polling districts ===
According to the gazette issued on 31 October 2022, the Mukah constituency has a total of 45 polling districts.

State constituency	Polling Districts	Code	Location
Dalat（N56）	Tanam	213/56/01	SK Kpg. Tanam Dalat
Dalat（N56）	Dalat	213/56/02	SJK (C) Chin Hua Dalat
Dalat（N56）	Kut	213/56/03	SK Kut Tengah
Dalat（N56）	Balan	213/56/04	SK Kpg. Balan
Dalat（N56）	Ud	213/56/05	SK Kpg. Sg. Ud
Dalat（N56）	Baru Dalat	213/56/06	Balai Raya Kpg. Baru Dalat
Dalat（N56）	Sungai Dalam	213/56/07	Balai Raya Sg. Dalam Dalat
Dalat（N56）	Klid	213/56/08	SK Kpg. Klid/ Plajau
Dalat（N56）	Kekan	213/56/09	Balai Raya Kpg. Kekan Dalat
Dalat（N56）	Medong	213/56/10	SK St. John Medong
Dalat（N56）	Kut Muara	213/56/11	SK St. Kevin Sg. Kut
Dalat（N56）	Narub	213/56/12	SJK (C) San San
Dalat（N56）	Oya	213/56/13	SK Datu Pengiran Mohamad
Dalat（N56）	Terus	213/56/14	SK Kpg. Bakong/Terus
Dalat（N56）	Teh Oya	213/56/15	SK Kpg. Teh Dalat
Dalat（N56）	Senau	213/56/16	SK Kpg. Senau
Tellian (N57)	Baoh	213/57/01	SK St. Luke Ng. Baoh Dalat
Tellian (N57)	Penat	213/57/02	Balai Raya Kpg. Penat
Tellian (N57)	Sebakong	213/57/03	RH Mawar Tanjong Pedada Mukah; RH Richard Kilat Madang
Tellian (N57)	Ulu Baoh	213/57/04	SK Ulu Baoh Dalat
Tellian (N57)	Dijih	213/57/05	SK Dijih Mukah; SK Lubok Bemban Mukah
Tellian (N57)	Ulu Sikat	213/57/06	SK Ladang 3
Tellian (N57)	Nangka Sikat	213/57/07	SK Ng. Sikat Mukah
Tellian (N57)	Engkerbai	213/57/08	SK Bukit Inkerbai Mukah
Tellian (N57)	Petanak Mukah	213/57/09	SRA (MIS) Mukah
Tellian (N57)	Tellian	213/57/10	SK Kpg. Tellian
Tellian (N57)	Judan	213/57/11	SK Dua Sg. Mukah
Tellian (N57)	Kuala Lama	213/57/12	SK St. Patrick Mukah
Tellian (N57)	Tellian Laut	213/57/13	Blok Lama SK Datuk Awang Udin
Tellian (N57)	Mukah	213/57/14	SJK (C) Chong Boon
Tellian (N57)	Penakop Permai	213/57/15	Makmal SK Datuk Awang Udin
Balingian (N58)	Litong	213/58/01	SK Kpg. Seberang Mukah
Balingian (N58)	Penakop	213/58/02	SK Kpg. Penakap Ulu Mukah
Balingian (N58)	Temesu	213/58/03	RH Entering Anak Geruna
Balingian (N58)	Balingan	213/58/04	SJK (C) Chung Hua Balingian
Balingian (N58)	Tutus	213/58/05	Pusat Sarawak Skills Mukah (PPKS) Mukah
Balingian (N58)	Jebungan	213/58/06	SK Kpg. Jebungan Mukah
Balingian (N58)	Kenyana	213/58/07	SK Kuala Kenyana Mukah
Balingian (N58)	Sesok	213/58/08	SK Kpg. Teh Mukah; SK Kpg. Sau Mukah; Dewan Serbaguna Kpg Sesok Baru
Balingian (N58)	Ulu Bedengan	213/58/09	Tadika Kemas Bayau Jln. Selangau / Mukah
Balingian (N58)	Bedengan	213/58/10	SK Sg. Bedengan Mukah
Balingian (N58)	Penipah	213/58/11	SK Sg. Penipah Mukah
Balingian (N58)	Kuala Balingian	213/58/12	SK Kuala Balingian
Balingian (N58)	Suyong	213/58/13	SK Parish
Balingian (N58)	Liok	213/58/14	SK Sg. Liok

=== Representation history ===
Members of Parliament for Mukah
Parliament	No	Years	Member	Party	Vote Share
Constituency created
		1969–1971	Parliament was suspended		
3rd	P136	1971–1973	Latip Idris (لاتيڤ إدريس)	BUMIPUTERA	3,632; 36.00%
3rd	P136	1973–1974	Latip Idris (لاتيڤ إدريس)	BN (PBB)	3,632; 36.00%
4th	P146	1974–1978	Latip Idris (لاتيڤ إدريس)	BN (PBB)	7,564; 66.87%
5th	P146	1978–1979	Salleh Jafaruddin (صالح جافارو الدين)	BN (PBB)	7,103; 72.97%
5th	P146	1980–1982	Edward Esnen Unang	BN (PBB)	Uncontested
6th	P146	1982–1986	Leo Michael Toyad	BN (PBB)	5,621; 70.59%
7th	P169	1986–1990	Leo Michael Toyad	BN (PBB)	8,615; 60.90%
8th	P173	1990–1995	Leo Michael Toyad	BN (PBB)	11,616; 77.82%
9th	P185	1995–1999	Leo Michael Toyad	BN (PBB)	Uncontested
10th	P186	1999–2004	Leo Michael Toyad	BN (PBB)	11,258; 75.31%
11th	P212	2004–2008	Leo Michael Toyad	BN (PBB)	11,829; 81.69%
12th	P213	2008–2013	Muhammad Leo Michael Toyad Abdullah (محمد ليو ميکائيل توياد بن عبدالله)	BN (PBB)	10,090; 72.68%
13th	P213	2013–2018	Muhammad Leo Michael Toyad Abdullah (محمد ليو ميکائيل توياد بن عبدالله)	BN (PBB)	14,983; 77.15%
14th	P213	2018	Hanifah Hajar Taib (حنيفه حجر طائب)	BN (PBB)	13,853; 66.90%
14th	P213	2018–2022	Hanifah Hajar Taib (حنيفه حجر طائب)	GPS (PBB)	13,853; 66.90%
15th	P213	2022–present	Hanifah Hajar Taib (حنيفه حجر طائب)	GPS (PBB)	21,733; 78.23%

=== State constituency ===
Parliamentary constituency	Area					
Parliamentary constituency	1968	1977	1987	1996	2005	2015
Balingian	Balingian; Kuala Bedengan; Mukah; Nangkai; Tellian		Balingian; Kuala Bedengan; Kuala Tatau; Mukah; Tellian	Balingian; Kenyana; Kuala Bedengan; Mukah; Tellian		Balingian; Kenyana; Kuala Bedengan; Penakop; Simpang Tireh
Dalat			Dalat; Igan; Kampung Bungan; Nanga Tamin; Oya	Dalat; Igan; Nanga Tamin; Narub; Oya	Dalat; Igan; Nanga Tamin; Narub; Oya	Dalat; Kampung Teh; Kampung Medong; Narub; Oya
Oya	Dalat; Narub; Oya; Selangau; Tamin	Dalat; Kampung Tanam; Nanga Tamin; Narub; Oya				
Tellian						Baoh; Kampung Penat; Mukah; Tellian; Ulu Baoh

=== Historical boundaries ===
State Constituency	Area					
State Constituency	1969–1978	1978–1990	1990–1999	1999–2008	2008–2016	2016−present
Mukah	Balingian					
Mukah			Dalat			
Mukah	Oya					
Mukah						Tellian

=== Current state assembly members ===
No.	State Constituency	Member	Party (Coalition)
N56	Dalat	Fatimah Abdullah	GPS (PBB)
N57	Tellian	Royston Valentine	GPS (PBB)
N58	Balingian	Abdul Yakub Arbi	GPS (PBB)

=== Local governments & postcodes ===
No.	State Constituency	Local Government	Postcode
N56	Dalat	Dalat & Mukah District Council	96300 Dalat; 96350 Balingian; 96400, 96410 Mukah
N57	Tellian	Sibu Rural District Council (Baoh area); Dalat & Mukah District Council	96300 Dalat; 96350 Balingian; 96400, 96410 Mukah
N58	Balingian	Dalat & Mukah District Council	96300 Dalat; 96350 Balingian; 96400, 96410 Mukah

== Election results ==
Malaysian general election, 2022
Party	Candidate	Votes	%	∆%
GPS	Hanifah Hajar Taib	21,733	78.23	▲78.23
PH	Abdul Jalil Bujang	6,047	21.77	▲21.77
Total valid votes		27,780	100.00	
Total rejected ballots		316		
Unreturned ballots		71		
Turnout		28,167	59.15	▼10.13
Registered electors		46,964		
Majority		15,686	56.46	▲22.65
GPS gain from BN		Swing		?
Source(s) https://lom.agc.gov.my/ilims/upload/portal/akta/outputp/1753265/PARLIMEN%20SARAWAK%20(PUB%20620).pdf

Malaysian general election, 2018
Party	Candidate	Votes	%	∆%
BN	Hanifah Hajar Taib	13,853	66.90	▼10.25
PKR	Abdul Jalil Bujang	6,853	33.10	▲33.10
Total valid votes		20,706	100.00	
Total rejected ballots		379		
Unreturned ballots		120		
Turnout		21,205	69.28	▼5.80
Registered electors		30,608		
Majority		7,000	33.81	▼31.91
BN hold		Swing		
Source(s) "His Majesty's Government Gazette - Notice of Contested Election, Parliament for the State of Sarawak [P.U. (B) 247/2018]" (PDF). Attorney General's Chambers of Malaysia. 3 May 2018. "Federal Government Gazette - Results of Contested Election and Statements of the Poll after the Official Addition of Votes, Parliamentary Constituencies for the State of Sarawak [P.U. (B) 321/2018]" (PDF). Attorney General's Chambers of Malaysia. 28 May 2018. Archived from the original (PDF) on 29 December 2019.

Malaysian general election, 2013
Party	Candidate	Votes	%	∆%
BN	Muhammad Leo Michael Toyad Abdullah	14,983	77.15	▲4.47
DAP	Hai Merawin @ Bonaventure	2,219	11.43	▲11.43
Independent	Sylvester Ajah Subah	2,219	11.43	▲11.43
Total valid votes		19,421	100.00	
Total rejected ballots		417		
Unreturned ballots		41		
Turnout		19,879	75.08	▲11.91
Registered electors		26,477		
Majority		12,764	65.72	▲20.36
BN hold		Swing		
Source(s) "Federal Government Gazette - Notice of Contested Election, Parliament for the State of Sarawak [P.U. (B) 184/2013]" (PDF). Attorney General's Chambers of Malaysia. 26 April 2013. Archived from the original (PDF) on 30 September 2018. "Federal Government Gazette - Results of Contested Election and Statements of the Poll after the Official Addition of Votes, Parliamentary Constituencies for the State of Sarawak [P.U. (B) 225/2013]" (PDF). Attorney General's Chambers of Malaysia. 22 May 2013. Archived from the original (PDF) on 30 September 2018.

Malaysian general election, 2008
Party	Candidate	Votes	%	∆%
BN	Muhammad Leo Michael Toyad Abdullah	10,090	72.68	▼9.01
Independent	Hai Merawin @ Bonaventure	3,792	27.32	▲27.32
Total valid votes		13,882	100.00	
Total rejected ballots		521		
Unreturned ballots		32		
Turnout		14,435	63.17	▲5.73
Registered electors		22,851		
Majority		6,298	45.36	▼18.02
BN hold		Swing		

Malaysian general election, 2004
Party	Candidate	Votes	%	∆%
BN	Leo Michael Toyad	11,829	81.69	▲6.38
Independent	Mohamad @ Latip Rahman	2,651	18.31	▲18.31
Total valid votes		14,480	100.00	
Total rejected ballots		341		
Unreturned ballots		28		
Turnout		14,849	57.44	▼3.09
Registered electors		25,853		
Majority		9,178	63.38	▲12.76
BN hold		Swing		

Total Elector count is from Tindak Malaysia's GitHub

Malaysian general election, 1999
Party	Candidate	Votes	%	∆%
BN	Leo Michael Toyad	11,258	75.31	▲75.31
PKR	Yusuf Abdul Rahman	3,691	24.69	▲24.69
Total valid votes		14,949	100.00	
Total rejected ballots		389		
Unreturned ballots		33		
Turnout		15,371	60.53	
Registered electors		25,390		
Majority		7,567	50.62	
BN hold		Swing		

Total electors is from Tindak Malaysia's GitHub

Malaysian general election, 1995
Party	Candidate	Votes	%	∆%
On the nomination day, Leo Michael Toyad won uncontested.
BN	Leo Michael Toyad			
Total valid votes			100.00	
Total rejected ballots				
Unreturned ballots				
Turnout				
Registered electors		29,048		
Majority				
BN hold		Swing		

Elector count is from Tindak Malaysia's GitHub

Malaysian general election, 1990
Party	Candidate	Votes	%	∆%
BN	Leo Michael Toyad	11,616	77.82	▲16.92
PERMAS	Abdul Ghani @ Lai Rani Etli	3,311	22.18	▲22.18
Total valid votes		14,927	100.00	
Total rejected ballots		395		
Unreturned ballots		0		
Turnout		15,322	60.91	▼10.56
Registered electors		25,155		
Majority		8,305	55.64	▲33.84
BN hold		Swing		

Malaysian general election, 1986
Party	Candidate	Votes	%	∆%
BN	Leo Michael Toyad	8,615	60.90	▼9.69
Independent	Salleh Jafaruddin	5,532	39.10	▲39.10
Total valid votes		14,147	100.00	
Total rejected ballots		229		
Unreturned ballots		0		
Turnout		14,376	71.56	
Registered electors		20,089		
Majority		3,083	21.80	▲19.38
BN hold		Swing		

Malaysian general election, 1982
Party	Candidate	Votes	%	∆%
BN	Leo Michael Toyad	5,621	70.59	▲70.59
Independent	Yaman Juan	2,342	29.41	▲29.41
Total valid votes		7,963	100.00	
Total rejected ballots		607		
Unreturned ballots		0		
Turnout		8,570	47.07	
Registered electors		18,207		
Majority		3,279	41.18	
BN hold		Swing		

Malaysian general by-election, 28 January 1980 Upon the resignation of incumbent, Salleh Jafaruddin
Party	Candidate	Votes	%	∆%
On the nomination day, Edwin Esnen Unang won uncontested.
BN	Edwin Esnen Unang			
Total valid votes			100.00	
Total rejected ballots				
Unreturned ballots				
Turnout				
Registered electors				
Majority				
BN hold		Swing		

Malaysian general election, 1978
Party	Candidate	Votes	%	∆%
BN	Salleh Jafaruddin	7,103	72.97	▲6.10
Parti Anak Jati Sarawak	Ligam Peter	2,631	27.03	▲27.03
Total valid votes		9,734	100.00	
Total rejected ballots		448		
Unreturned ballots		0		
Turnout		10,182	58.29	▼7.08
Registered electors		17,469		
Majority		4,472	45.94	▲12.20
BN hold		Swing		

Malaysian general election, 1974
Party	Candidate	Votes	%	∆%
BN	Latip Idris	7,564	66.87	▲66.87
SNAP	Sim Boon Liang	3,747	33.13	▲10.33
Total valid votes		11,310	100.00	
Total rejected ballots		553		
Unreturned ballots		0		
Turnout		11,864	65.37	
Registered electors		18,148		
Majority		3,817	33.74	▲20.54
BN gain from PBB		Swing		?

Malaysian general election, 1969
Party	Candidate	Votes	%
PBB	Latip Idris	3,632	36.00
SNAP	Ugil Unchong	2,300	22.80
PESAKA	Stephen Kule	1,892	18.75
SUPP	Richard Boya	1,368	13.56
Independent	Jawan Kapong	896	8.88
Total valid votes		10,088	100.00
Total rejected ballots		819	
Unreturned ballots			
Turnout		10,907	69.04
Registered electors		15,798	
Majority		1,332	13.20
This was a new constituency created.
