= Abdul Rahman Mohamad =

Malaysian politician

Yang Berhormat Dato' Sri Abdul Rahman Mohamad SSAP MP
- عبدالرحمٰن محمد
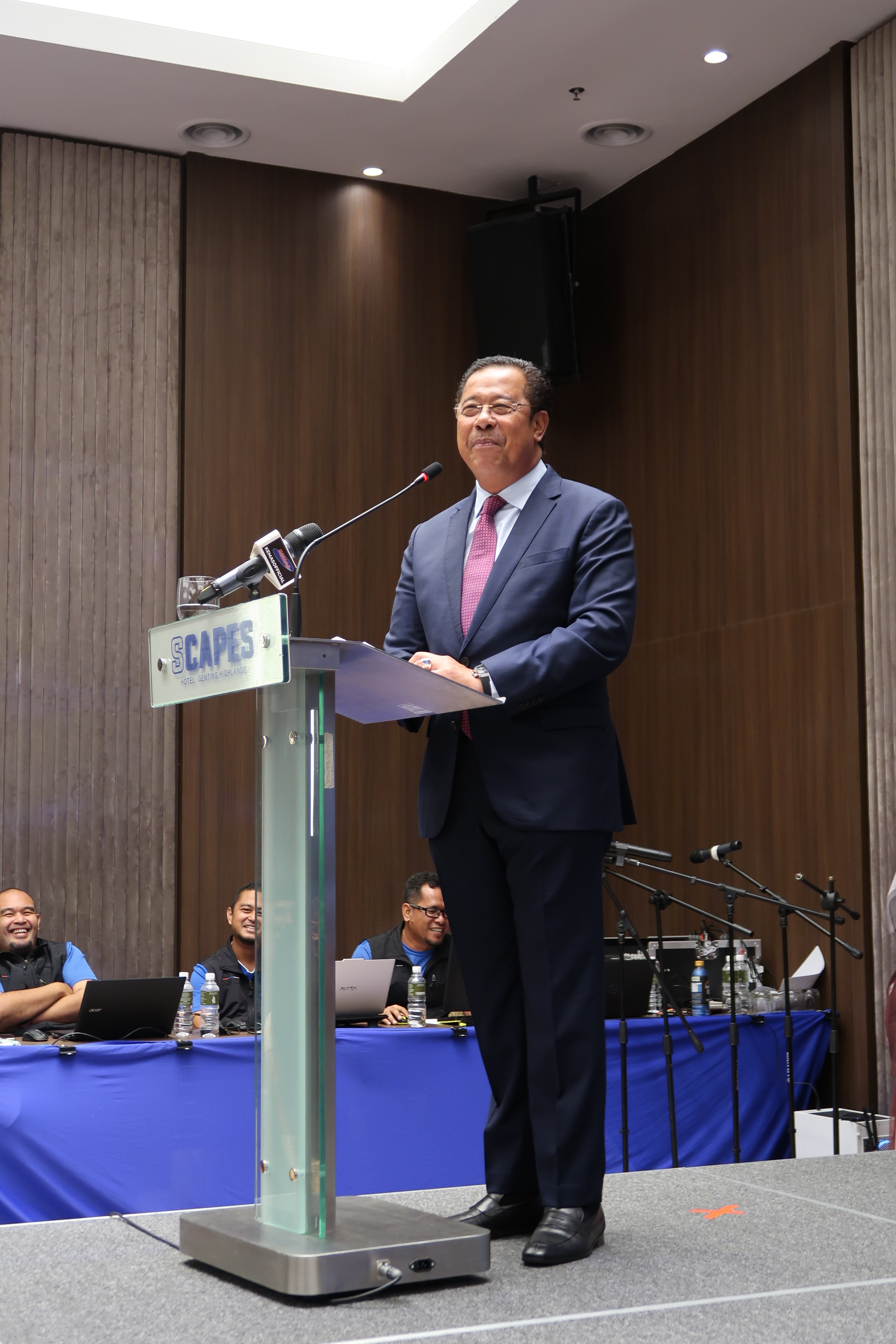

Deputy Minister of Energy Transition and Water Transformation
- Incumbent
- Assumed office 17 December 2025
- Monarch: Ibrahim Iskandar
- Prime Minister: Anwar Ibrahim
- Minister: Fadillah Yusof
- Preceded by: Akmal Nasrullah Mohd Nasir
- Constituency: Lipis

Deputy Minister of Human Resources
- In office 12 December 2023 – 17 December 2025
- Monarchs: Abdullah (2023–2024); Ibrahim Iskandar (since 2024)
- Prime Minister: Anwar Ibrahim
- Minister: Steven Sim Chee Keong
- Preceded by: Mustapha Sakmud
- Succeeded by: Khairul Firdaus Akbar Khan
- Constituency: Lipis

Deputy Minister of Works
- In office 10 December 2022 – 12 December 2023
- Monarch: Abdullah
- Prime Minister: Anwar Ibrahim
- Minister: Alexander Nanta Linggi
- Preceded by: Arthur Joseph Kurup
- Succeeded by: Ahmad Maslan
- Constituency: Lipis

Deputy Minister of Rural Development I
- In office 30 August 2021 – 24 November 2022 Serving with Hasbi Habibollah
- Monarch: Abdullah
- Prime Minister: Ismail Sabri Yaakob
- Minister: Mahdzir Khalid
- Preceded by: Himself
- Succeeded by: Rubiah Wang (Deputy Minister of Rural and Regional Development)
- Constituency: Lipis
- In office 10 March 2020 – 16 August 2021 Serving with Henry Sum Agong
- Monarch: Abdullah
- Prime Minister: Muhyiddin Yassin
- Minister: Abdul Latiff Ahmad
- Preceded by: Sivarasa Rasiah
- Succeeded by: Himself
- Constituency: Lipis

Member of the Malaysian Parliament for Lipis
- Incumbent
- Assumed office 5 May 2013
- Preceded by: Mohamad Shahrum Osman (BN–UMNO)
- Majority: 3,469 (2013); 6,569 (2018); 6,118 (2022)

Member of the Pahang State Legislative Assembly for Padang Tengku
- In office 21 March 2004 – 5 May 2013
- Preceded by: Abdul Halim Mansor (BN–UMNO)
- Succeeded by: Mustapa Long (BN–UMNO)
- Majority: 1,621 (2004); 1,188 (2008)

Faction represented in Dewan Rakyat
- 2013–: Barisan Nasional

Faction represented in Pahang State Legislative Assembly
- 2004–2013: Barisan Nasional

Personal details
- Born: Abdul Rahman bin Mohamad; 13 April 1964 (age 62) Lipis, Pahang, Malaysia
- Citizenship: Malaysian
- Party: United Malay National Organisation (UMNO)
- Other political affiliations: Barisan Nasional (BN)
- Occupation: Politician

Abdul Rahman bin Mohamad (Jawi: عبدالرحمن بن محمد; born 13 April 1964) is a Malaysian politician who has served as the Deputy Minister of Energy Transition and Water Transformation in the Unity Government administration under Prime Minister Anwar Ibrahim and Minister Fadillah Yusof since December 2025 and the Member of Parliament (MP) for Lipis since May 2013. He previously served as the Deputy Minister of Human Resources in the Unity Government administration under Prime Minister Anwar Ibrahim and Minister Steven Sim Chee Keong from December 2023 to December 2025 and as the Deputy Minister of Works under Minister Alexander Nanta Linggi from December 2022 to December 2023 prior to the 2023 cabinet reshuffle, Deputy Minister of Rural Development I in the Barisan Nasional (BN) administration under former Prime Minister Ismail Sabri Yaakob and former Minister Mahdzir Khalid from August 2021 to the collapse of the BN administration in November 2022 and his first term in the Perikatan Nasional (PN) administration under former Prime Minister Muhyiddin Yassin and former Minister Abdul Latiff Ahmad from March 2020 to the collapse of the PN administration in August 2021. He had also served as Member of the Pahang State Legislative Assembly (MLA) for Padang Tengku from March 2004 to May 2013. He is a member and the Division Chief of Lipis of the United Malays National Organisation (UMNO), a component party of the BN coalition.

== Politics ==
Abdul Rahman contested for Padang Tengku assembly state in 2004 and re-elected in 2008 general election. He contested for Lipis parliamentary seat in 2013 and won that seat. He contested again in 2018 and 2022 general elections and retained the seat.

== Election results ==
Pahang State Legislative Assembly
Year	Constituency	Candidate	Votes	Pct	Opponent(s)	Votes	Pct	Ballots cast	Majority	Turnout
2004	N03 Padang Tengku	Abdul Rahman Mohamad (UMNO)	4,683	60.46%	Abdullah Abdul Wahab (PAS)	3,062	39.54%	7,876	1,621	79.64%
2008	N03 Padang Tengku	Abdul Rahman Mohamad (UMNO)	4,653	57.32%	Roslan Zainal (PAS)	3,465	42.68%	8,298	1,188	80.70%

Parliament of Malaysia
Year	Constituency	Candidate	Votes	Pct	Opponent(s)	Votes	Pct	Ballots cast	Majority	Turnout
2013	P079 Lipis	Abdul Rahman Mohamad (UMNO)	14,863	55.96%	Mohd Mahyuddin Ghazal @ Razali (PAS)	11,394	42.90%	27,126	3,469	83.92%
2013	P079 Lipis	Abdul Rahman Mohamad (UMNO)	14,863	55.96%	Aishaton Abu Bakar (IND)	303	1.14%	27,126	3,469	83.92%
2018	P079 Lipis	Abdul Rahman Mohamad (UMNO)	13,995	49.82%	Badarudin Abd Rahaman (BERSATU)	7,426	26.43%	28,666	6,569	81.22%
2018	P079 Lipis	Abdul Rahman Mohamad (UMNO)	13,995	49.82%	Sobirin Duli (PAS)	6,671	23.75%	28,666	6,569	81.22%
2022	P079 Lipis	Abdul Rahman Mohamad (UMNO)	17,672	49.29%	Mohamad Shahrum Osman (BERSATU)	11,554	32.22%	35,855	6,118	76.09%
2022	P079 Lipis	Abdul Rahman Mohamad (UMNO)	17,672	49.29%	Tengku Zulpuri Shah Raja Puji (DAP)	6,366	17.75%	35,855	6,118	76.09%
2022	P079 Lipis	Abdul Rahman Mohamad (UMNO)	17,672	49.29%	Aishaton Abu Bakar (PEJUANG)	263	0.76%	35,855	6,118	76.09%

== Honours ==
=== Honours of Malaysia ===
- Malaysia
  - Recipient of the 17th Yang di-Pertuan Agong Installation Medal (2024)
- Pahang
  - Knight Grand Companion of the Order of Sultan Ahmad Shah of Pahang (SSAP) – Dato' Sri (2017)
  - Knight Companion of the Order of the Crown of Pahang (DIMP) – Dato' (2009)
  - Companion of the Order of the Crown of Pahang (SMP) (2007)
  - Member of the Order of the Crown of Pahang (AMP)
