= Miri Marriott Resort & Spa =

Hotel in Malaysia

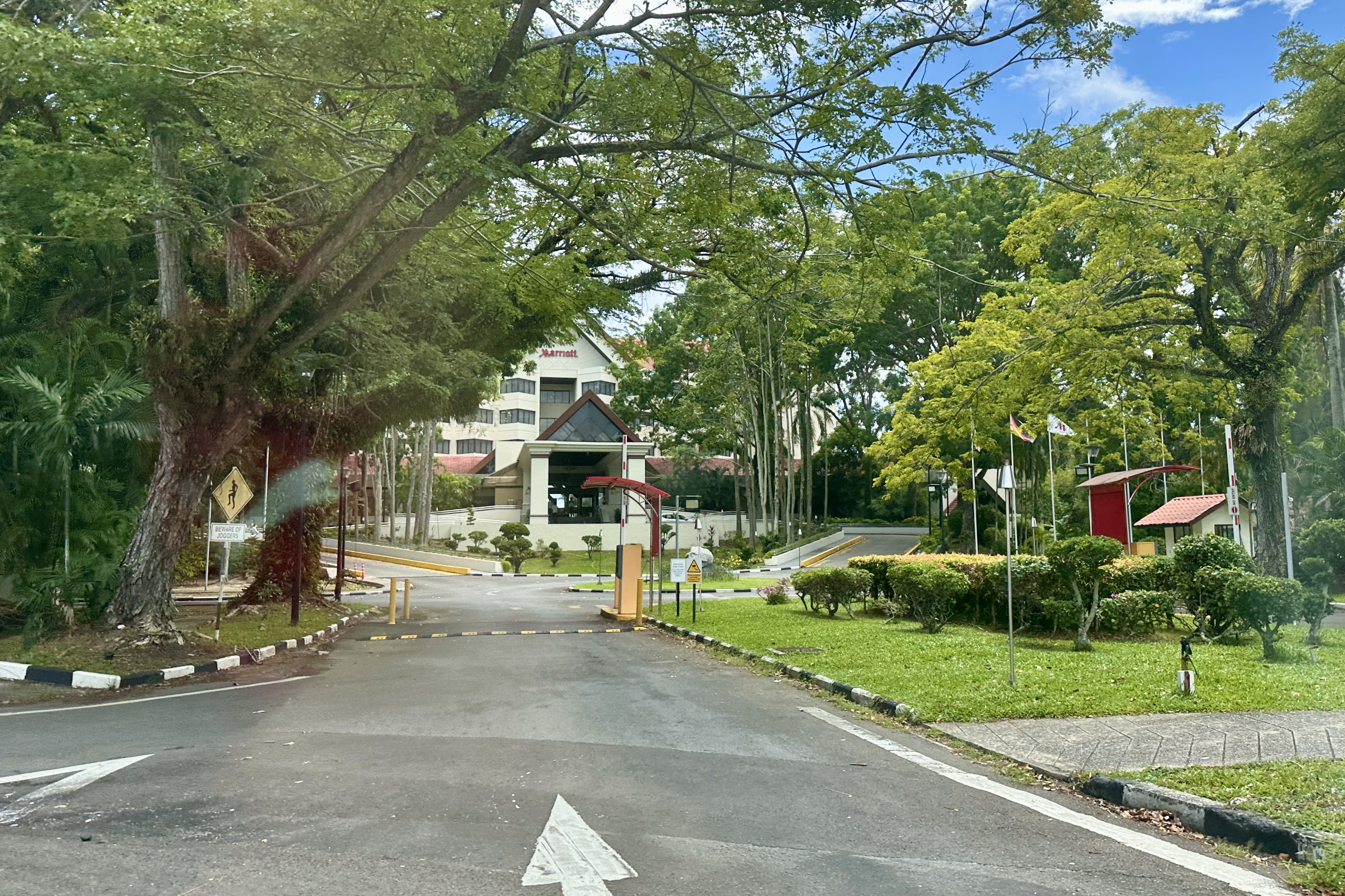
- Miri Marriott Resort & Spa in 2024

- Location within Malaysia

General information
- Location: Jalan Temenggong Datuk Oyong Lawai Miri, 98000 Malaysia
- Coordinates: 4.375074°N 113.971185°E
- Opening: 2005
- Management: Marriott International

Other information
- Number of rooms: 220
- Number of restaurants: 4
- Parking: Available

Website
- Miri Marriott Resort & Spa

Miri Marriott Resort & Spa is the first and only international five star hotel in Miri, Malaysia as of April 2009.

== Background ==
Miri Marriott Resort & Spa was formerly RIHGA Royal Hotel Miri. The resort was opened in 2005 following an extensive renovation of its guestrooms, food and beverage outlets and other public areas before being rebranded a Marriott resort. It is the sixth Marriott branded hotel in Malaysia.

== Facilities ==
The modern 5-story resort hotel is situated on a 20-acres land at Brighton Beach, facing the South China Sea. The hotel is equipped with 8,208 sq ft of meeting rooms that capable of holding 720 people.

== See also ==
- Marriott International
- Marriott Hotels
- Marriott India
