= Minister of Economy (Malaysia) =

- Menteri Ekonomi
- Coat of Arms of the Government of Malaysia

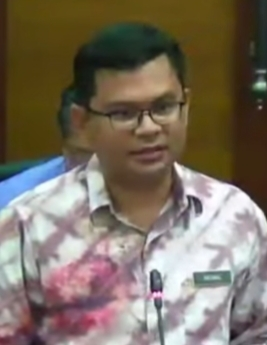
- Incumbent; Akmal Nasrullah Mohd Nasir since 17 December 2025
- Ministry of Economy
- Style: Economy Minister (informal); The Honourable (within Malaysia and the Commonwealth)
- Abbreviation: EKONOMI
- Member of: Cabinet
- Reports to: The Prime Minister
- Seat: Putrajaya
- Nominator: The Prime Minister
- Appointer: The Yang di-Pertuan Agong; (on the advice of the Prime Minister)
- Term length: At His Majesty's Pleasure
- Formation: 21 May 2018: (as Minister of Economic Affairs); 3 December 2022: (as Minister of Economy)
- First holder: Azmin Ali (as Minister of Economic Affairs)
- Deputy: Mohd Shahar Abdullah
- Salary: RM14,970
- Website: https://ekonomi.gov.my

The minister of economy, also informally known as the economy minister, is a minister in the Government of Malaysia, with overall responsibility for the functions and objectives of the Ministry of Economy. The incumbent is a member of the Cabinet of Malaysia.

The office holder works alongside the deputy minister of economy, presently Mohd Shahar Abdullah. The corresponding shadow minister is the shadow minister of economy, Syahir Sulaiman.

== List of ministers ==
=== Economic affairs/economy ===
The following individuals have held office as Minister of Economic Affairs/Economy:

Political party: PH Independent

Portrait	Name (Birth–Death) Constituency	Political party	Title	Took office	Left office	Deputy Minister	Prime Minister (Cabinet)
	Mohamed Azmin Ali (b. 1964); MP for Gombak	PH (PKR)	Minister of Economic Affairs	21 May 2018	24 February 2020	Radzi Jidin	Mahathir Mohamad (VII)
	Rafizi Ramli (b. 1977); MP for Pandan	PH (PKR)	Minister of Economy	3 December 2022	17 June 2025	Hanifah Hajar Taib	Anwar Ibrahim (I)
	Amir Hamzah Azizan (b. 1967); Senator; Acting	Independent	Minister of Economy	27 June 2025	17 December 2025	Hanifah Hajar Taib	Anwar Ibrahim (I)
	Akmal Nasrullah Mohd Nasir (b. 1986); MP for Johor Bahru	PH (PKR)	Minister of Economy	17 December 2025	Incumbent	Mohd Shahar Abdullah	Anwar Ibrahim (I)

=== General Planning and Sosio-Economic Research ===
The following individuals have been appointed as Minister of General Planning and Sosio-Economic Research, or any of its precedent titles.

Political party: BN

Portrait	Name (Birth–Death) Constituency	Political party	Title	Took office	Left office	Deputy Minister	Prime Minister (Cabinet)
	Abdul Taib Mahmud (1936–2024); MP for Samarahan	BN (PBB)	Minister of General Planning and Sosio-Economic Research	1974	1976	Vacant	Abdul Razak Hussein (II)

=== Prime Minister's Department (Economic Planning Unit) ===
The following individuals have held office as the Minister in the Prime Minister's Department under the Economic Planning Unit (EPU) department:

Political party: BN Independent PN

Portrait	Name (Birth–Death) Constituency	Political party	Responsible for	Took office	Left office	Deputy Minister	Prime Minister (Cabinet)
	Amirsham Abdul Aziz (b. 1964); Senator	BN (UMNO)	Economic Planning Unit (EPU) Department	19 March 2008	9 April 2009	Vacant	Abdullah Ahmad Badawi (III)
	Nor Mohamed Yakcop (b. 1947); MP for Tasek Gelugor	BN (UMNO)	Economic Planning Unit (EPU) Department	10 April 2009	15 May 2013	Vacant	Najib Razak (I)
	Abdul Wahid Omar (b. 1964); Senator	Independent	Economic Planning Unit (EPU) Department	5 June 2013	4 June 2016	Vacant	Najib Razak (II)
	Abdul Rahman Dahlan (b. 1965); MP for Kota Belud	BN (UMNO)	Economic Planning Unit (EPU) Department	27 June 2016	9 May 2018	Devamany S. Krishnasamy	Najib Razak (II)
	Mustapa Mohamed (b. 1950); MP for Jeli	PN (BERSATU)	Economic Planning Unit (EPU) Department	10 March 2020	24 November 2022	Arthur Joseph Kurup (2020–2021); Eddin Syazlee Shith (2021–2022)	Muhyiddin Yassin (I); Ismail Sabri Yaakob (I)

== See also ==
- Ministry of Economy (Malaysia)
- Minister of Finance (Malaysia)
