= Leo Michael Toyad =

Malaysian politician

Yang Berbahagia Tan Sri Dato Sri Dr. Muhammad Leo Michael Toyad Abdullah PSM PNBS PGBK JBS
- محمد ليو ميکائيل توياد بن عبدالله

Minister of Tourism
- In office 27 March 2004 – 14 February 2006
- Monarch: Sirajuddin
- Prime Minister: Abdullah Ahmad Badawi
- Deputy: Ahmad Zahid Hamidi
- Preceded by: Abdul Kadir Sheikh Fadzir
- Succeeded by: Tengku Adnan Tengku Mansor
- Constituency: Mukah

Deputy Minister of Foreign Affairs
- In office 4 May 1995 – 26 March 2004
- Monarchs: Ja'afar; Salahuddin; Sirajuddin
- Prime Minister: Mahathir Mohamad; Abdullah Ahmad Badawi
- Minister: Abdullah Ahmad Badawi (1995-1999); Syed Hamid Albar (1999-2004)
- Succeeded by: Joseph Salang Gandum
- Constituency: Mukah

Deputy Minister of Education
- In office 11 August 1986 – 4 May 1995 Serving with Fong Chan Onn
- Monarchs: Iskandar; Azlan Shah; Ja'afar
- Prime Minister: Mahathir Mohamad
- Minister: Anwar Ibrahim (1986-1990); Sulaiman Daud (1990-1995)
- Preceded by: 1. Tan Tiong Hong; 2. Mohd Khalil Yaakob
- Succeeded by: Mohd Khalid Mohd Yunos
- Constituency: Mukah

Member of the Malaysian Parliament for Mukah
- In office 1982 – 9 May 2018
- Preceded by: Edwin Esnen Unang
- Succeeded by: Hanifah Hajar Taib
- Majority: 3,083 (1986); 8,305 (1990) uncontested (1995); 7,567 (1999); 9,178 (2004); 6,298 (2008); 12,764 (2013)

Personal details
- Born: Leo Michael Toyad; 11 April 1950 (age 76) Mukah, Crown Colony of Sarawak (now Sarawak, Malaysia)
- Party: Parti Pesaka Bumiputera Bersatu (PBB)
- Other political affiliations: Barisan Nasional (BN)
- Spouse: Matilda Ho Kim Luan
- Children: 4
- Occupation: Politician

Muhammad Leo Michael Toyad bin Abdullah (Jawi: محمد ليو ميکائيل توياد بن عبدالله; born 11 April 1950) is a Malaysian politician. He is the former Member of the Parliament of Malaysia for the Mukah constituency in Sarawak, representing the Parti Pesaka Bumiputera Bersatu (PBB) in the ruling Barisan Nasional (BN) coalition.

Toyad was first elected to Parliament in the 1982 election. In 1987, he became Deputy Minister for Foreign Affairs, appointed by Prime Minister Mahathir Mohamad. After the 2004 election, he joined the full ministry of Prime Minister Abdullah Badawi as Minister for Tourism. He was dropped from the cabinet in 2006, in a move that surprised observers, to be replaced by Tengku Adnan Tengku Mansor. Ahead of the 2008 election he indicated his intention to retire, but he recontested and won his seat, both in that poll and again in 2013.

== Election results ==
Parliament of Malaysia
Year	Constituency	Candidate	Votes	Pct	Opponent(s)	Votes	Pct	Ballots cast	Majority	Turnout
1982	P146 Mukah, Sarawak	Leo Michael Toyad (PBB)		70.59%	Yaman Juan (IND)		29.41%			
1986	P169 Mukah, Sarawak	Leo Michael Toyad (PBB)	8,615	60.90%	Salleh Jafaruddin (IND)	5,532	39.10%	14,376	3,083	71.56%
1990	P173 Mukah, Sarawak	Leo Michael Toyad (PBB)	11,616	77.82%	Abdul Ghani @ Lai Rani Etli (PERMAS)	3,311	22.18%	15,322	8,305	60.91%
1995	P185 Mukah, Sarawak	Leo Michael Toyad (PBB)	None	None	Unopposed					
1999	P185 Mukah, Sarawak	Leo Michael Toyad (PBB)	11,258	75.31%	Yusuf Abdul Rahman (keADILan)	3,691	24.69%	15,371	7,567	60.53%
2004	P212 Mukah, Sarawak	Leo Michael Toyad (PBB)	11,829	81.69%	Mohamad @ Latip Rahman (IND)	2,651	18.31%	14,849	9,178	57.44%
2008	P213 Mukah, Sarawak	Muhammad Leo Michael Toyad Abdullah (PBB)	10,090	72.68%	Hai Merawin @ Bonaventure (IND)	3,792	27.32%	14,435	6,298	63.17%
2013	P213 Mukah, Sarawak	Muhammad Leo Michael Toyad Abdullah (PBB)	14,983	77.15%	Hai Merawin @ Bonaventure (DAP)	2,219	11.43%	19,879	12,764	75.08%
2013	P213 Mukah, Sarawak	Muhammad Leo Michael Toyad Abdullah (PBB)	14,983	77.15%	Sylvester Ajah Subah (IND)	2,219	11.43%	19,879	12,764	75.08%

== Honours ==
=== Honours of Malaysia ===
- Malaysia
  - Commander of the Order of Loyalty to the Crown of Malaysia (PSM) – Tan Sri (2017)
- Sarawak
  - Knight Commander of the Order of the Star of Sarawak (PNBS) – Dato Sri (2006)
  - Commander of the Order of the Star of Hornbill Sarawak (PGBK) – Datuk (1996)
  - Companion of the Most Exalted Order of the Star of Sarawak (JBS) (1989)
  - Gold Medal of the Sarawak Independence Diamond Jubilee Medal (2023)
