= Padang Tengku =

Political subdivision in Malaysia

Padang Tengku (N03)
Pahang constituency

State constituency
- Legislature: Pahang State Legislative Assembly
MLA
Mustapa Long
BN
- Constituency created: 1994
- First contested: 1995
- Last contested: 2022

Demographics
- Electors (2022): 19,407

Padang Tengku is a state constituency in Pahang, Malaysia, that is represented in the Pahang State Legislative Assembly.

== Demographics ==
Ethnic breakdown of Padang Tengku's electorate as of 2022
1. Malay (91.7%)
2. Indian (2.94%)
3. Chinese (2.86%)
4. Other ethnicities (2.51%)

== History ==
=== Polling districts ===
According to the federal gazette issued on 31 October 2022, the Padang Tengku constituency is divided into 19 polling districts.

State constituency	Polling district	Code	Location
Padang Tengku（N03）	Merapoh	079/03/01	SK Merapoh
Padang Tengku（N03）	Mentara	079/03/02	SMK Merapoh
Padang Tengku（N03）	Teluk Gunung	079/03/03	SK Teluk Gunung
Padang Tengku（N03）	Kampung Petola	079/03/04	Balai Raya Kampung Petola
Padang Tengku（N03）	Pagar Sasak	079/03/05	SK Pagar Sasak
Padang Tengku（N03）	FELDA Sungai Kechau	079/03/06	SK LKTP Kecau 1
Padang Tengku（N03）	Ladang Selborne	079/03/07	SJK (T) Ladang Selborne
Padang Tengku（N03）	Padang Tengku	079/03/08	SMK Padang Tengku
Padang Tengku（N03）	Gua	079/03/09	SK Gua
Padang Tengku（N03）	Tempoyong	079/03/10	Dewan Orang Ramai Kampung Tempoyong
Padang Tengku（N03）	Bapong	079/03/11	Balai Raya Kampung Bapong
Padang Tengku（N03）	Relong	079/03/12	SK Relong
Padang Tengku（N03）	Berchang	079/03/13	SK Berchang
Padang Tengku（N03）	Telang	079/03/14	SK Kuala Telang
Padang Tengku（N03）	Seberang Jelai	079/03/15	Balai Raya Kampung Seberang Jelai
Padang Tengku（N03）	Kechur	079/03/16	SK Kechor Tui
Padang Tengku（N03）	Aur Gading	079/03/17	SK Aur Geding
Padang Tengku（N03）	Chegar Perah	079/03/18	SK Chegar Perah
Padang Tengku（N03）	Sungai Temau	079/03/19	SK (LKTP) Chegar Perah

=== Representation history ===
Members of the Legislative Assembly for Padang Tengku
Assembly	No	Years	Name	Party
Constituency created from Bukit Betung and Jelai
9th	N03	1995-1999	Abdul Fattah Abdullah	BN (UMNO)
10th	N03	1999-2004	Abdul Halim Mansor	BN (UMNO)
11th	N03	2004-2008	Abdul Rahman Mohamad	BN (UMNO)
12th	N03	2008-2013	Abdul Rahman Mohamad	BN (UMNO)
13th	N03	2013-2018	Mustapa Long	BN (UMNO)
14th	N03	2018-2022	Mustapa Long	BN (UMNO)
15th	N03	2022-present	Mustapa Long	BN (UMNO)

== Election results ==
Pahang state election, 2022: Padang Tengku
Party	Candidate	Votes	%	∆%
BN	Mustapa Long	7,198	47.14	▼2.60
PN	Muhamad Khaider Kamil	6,691	43.82	▲43.82
PH	Ruzi @ Nata Yusuff	1,203	7.88	▲7.88
PEJUANG	Mohd Rostam Mustapha	176	1.15	▲1.15
Total valid votes		15,268	100.00	
Total rejected ballots		182		
Unreturned ballots		47		
Turnout		15,497	79.85	▼3.15
Registered electors		19,407		
Majority		507	3.35	▼7.52
BN hold		Swing		

Pahang state election, 2018
Party	Candidate	Votes	%	∆%
BN	Mustapa Long	5,691	49.74	▼9.52
PAS	Roslan Harun	4,447	38.87	▼1.87
PKR	Alias Abd Rahman	1,303	11.39	▲11.39
Total valid votes		11,441	100.00	
Total rejected ballots		173		
Unreturned ballots		53		
Turnout		11,667	83.00	▼3.79
Registered electors		14,057		
Majority		1,244	10.87	▼7.65
BN hold		Swing		
Source(s) "Pahang - 14th General Election Malaysia (GE14 / PRU14)". The Star.

Pahang state election, 2013: Padang Tengku
Party	Candidate	Votes	%	∆%
BN	Mustapa Long	6,124	59.26	▲1.94
PAS	Roslan Zainal	4,210	40.74	▼1.94
Total valid votes		10,334	100.00	
Total rejected ballots		163		
Unreturned ballots		1		
Turnout		10,498	86.79	▲6.08
Registered electors		12,096		
Majority		1,914	18.52	▲3.89
BN hold		Swing		

Pahang state election, 2008: Padang Tengku
Party	Candidate	Votes	%	∆%
BN	Abdul Rahman Mohamad	4,653	57.32	▼3.15
PAS	Roslan Zainal	3,465	42.68	▲3.15
Total valid votes		8,118	100.00	
Total rejected ballots		160		
Unreturned ballots		20		
Turnout		8,298	80.70	▲1.07
Registered electors		10,282		
Majority		1,188	14.63	▼6.30
BN hold		Swing		

Pahang state election, 2004: Padang Tengku
Party	Candidate	Votes	%	∆%
BN	Abdul Rahman Mohamad	4,683	60.46	▲9.85
PAS	Abdullah Abdul Wahab	3,062	39.54	▼9.85
Total valid votes		7,745	100.00	
Total rejected ballots		112		
Unreturned ballots		19		
Turnout		7,876	79.64	▲2.74
Registered electors		9,890		
Majority		1,621	20.93	▲19.70
BN hold		Swing		

Pahang state election, 1999: Padang Tengku
Party	Candidate	Votes	%	∆%
BN	Abdul Halim Mansor	3,533	50.62	▼10.38
PAS	Mohd Rasad Dolah Omar	3,447	49.38	▲10.38
Total valid votes		6,980	100.00	
Total rejected ballots		173		
Unreturned ballots		19		
Turnout		7,172	76.90	▲4.71
Registered electors		9,327		
Majority		86	1.23	▼20.76
BN hold		Swing		

Pahang state election, 1995: Padang Tengku
Party	Candidate	Votes	%
BN	Abdul Fattah Abdullah	3,985	61.00
PAS	Mohd Alwi Abdul Hamid	2,548	39.00
Total valid votes		6,533	100.00
Total rejected ballots		9	
Unreturned ballots		25	
Turnout		6,567	72.19
Registered electors		9,097	
Majority		1,437	22.00
This was a new constituency created.
