= Minister of Energy Transition and Water Transformation =

Malaysian government minister

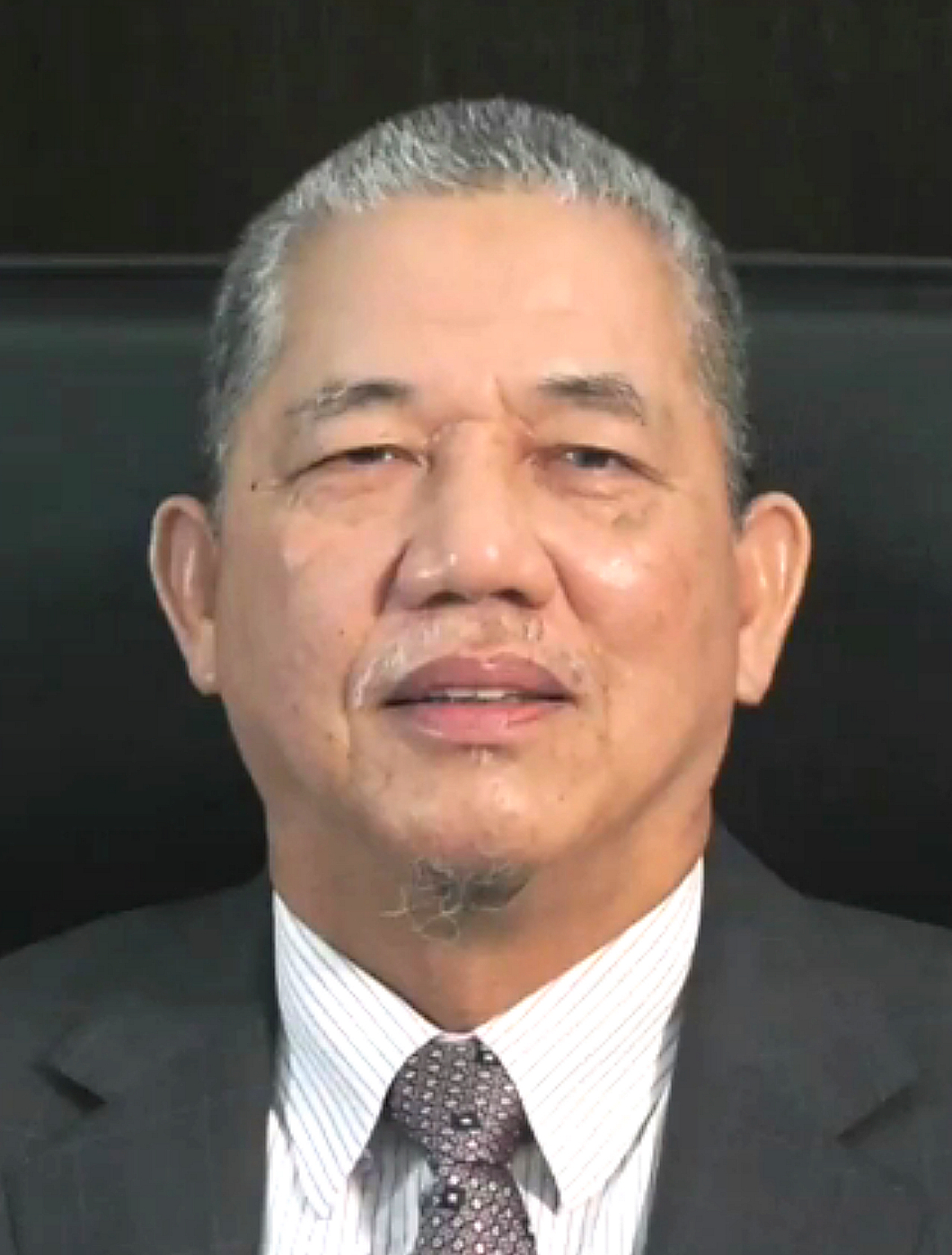
- Incumbent; Fadillah Yusof since 12 December 2023
- Ministry of Energy Transition and Water Transformation
- Style: Yang Berhormat Menteri (The Honourable Minister)
- Abbreviation: PETRA
- Member of: Cabinet of Malaysia
- Reports to: Parliament of Malaysia
- Seat: Putrajaya
- Appointer: Yang di-Pertuan Agong on the recommendation of the Prime Minister of Malaysia
- Formation: 1955
- First holder: Abdul Ghani Gilong as Minister of Works and Energy
- Deputy: Abdul Rahman Mohamad
- Website: www.petra.gov.my

The Minister of Energy Transition and Water Transformation of Malaysia has been Fadillah Yusof since 12 December 2023. He has been deputised by Deputy Minister of Energy Transition and Water Transformation Abdul Rahman Mohamad since 17 December 2025. The minister administers the portfolio through the Ministry of Energy Transition and Water Transformation. The ministry was formed as a result of a split from the Ministry of Natural Resources, Energy and Climate Change.

== List of ministers ==
=== Energy/energy transition ===
The following individuals have been appointed as Minister of Energy/Energy Transition, or any of its precedent titles:

Political party: Alliance/BN PH PN GPS

Portrait	Name (Birth–Death) Constituency	Political party	Title	Took office	Left office	Deputy Minister	Prime Minister (Cabinet)
	Abdul Ghani Gilong (1932–2021); MP for Kinabalu	Alliance (USNO)	Minister of Works and Energy	1972	1974	Vacant	Abdul Razak Hussein (I)
	Mohamed Yaacob (1926–2009); MP for Tanah Merah	BN (UMNO)	Minister of Energy, Technology and Research	1974	1976	Vacant	Abdul Razak Hussein (II)
	Leo Moggie Irok (b. 1941); MP for Kanowit	BN (SNAP) (PBDS)	Minister of Energy, Telecommunications and Posts	1978	15 June 1989	Najib Razak (1978–1979); Nik Hussein Abdul Rahman (1979–1981); Clarence E. Mansul (1981–1983); Suhaimi Kamaruddin (1983–1984); Abdul Rahim Abu Bakar (1984–1986); Zainal Abidin Zin (1986–1987); Abdul Ghani Othman (1987–1989)	Hussein Onn (II); Mahathir Mohamad (I · II · III)
	Samy Vellu (1937–2022); MP for Sungai Siput	BN (MIC)	Minister of Energy, Telecommunications and Posts	15 June 1989	3 May 1995	Abdul Ghani Othman (1989–1990); Tajol Rosli Mohd Ghazali (1990–1995)	Mahathir Mohamad (III · IV)
	Leo Moggie Irok (b. 1941); MP for Kanowit	BN (PBDS)	Minister of Energy, Communications and Multimedia	4 May 1995	14 December 1999	Chan Kong Choy	Mahathir Mohamad (V)
	Leo Moggie Irok (b. 1941); MP for Kanowit	BN (PBDS)	Minister of Energy, Water and Communications	15 December 1999	26 March 2004	Tan Chai Ho	Mahathir Mohamad (VI); Abdullah Ahmad Badawi (I)
	Lim Keng Yaik (1939–2012); MP for Beruas	BN (Gerakan)	Minister of Energy, Water and Communications	27 March 2004	18 March 2008	Shaziman Abu Mansor	Abdullah Ahmad Badawi (II)
	Shaziman Abu Mansor (b. 1964); MP for Tampin	BN (UMNO)	Minister of Energy, Water and Communications	19 March 2008	9 April 2009	Joseph Salang Gandum	Abdullah Ahmad Badawi (III)
	Peter Chin Fah Kui (b. 1945); MP for Miri	BN (SUPP)	Minister of Energy, Green Technology and Water	10 April 2009	15 May 2013	Noriah Kasnon	Najib Razak (I)
	Maximus Ongkili (b. 1953); MP for Kota Marudu	BN (PBS)	Minister of Energy, Green Technology and Water	16 May 2013	9 May 2018	Mahdzir Khalid (2013–2015); James Dawos Mamit (2015–2018)	Najib Razak (II)
	Yeo Bee Yin (b. 1983); MP for Bakri	PH (DAP)	Minister of Energy, Science, Technology, Environment and Climate Change	2 July 2018	24 February 2020	Isnaraissah Munirah Majilis	Mahathir Mohamad (VII)
	Dr. Shamsul Anuar Nasarah (b. 1967); MP for Lenggong	BN (UMNO)	Minister of Energy and Natural Resources	10 March 2020	3 August 2021	Ali Biju	Muhyiddin Yassin (I)
	Takiyuddin Hassan (b. 1961); MP for Kota Bharu	PN (PAS)	Minister of Energy and Natural Resources	30 August 2021	24 November 2022	Ali Biju	Ismail Sabri Yaakob (I)
	Fadillah Yusof (b. 1962) (Deputy Prime Minister); MP for Petra Jaya	GPS (PBB)	Minister of Energy Transition and Public Utilities	12 December 2023	7 February 2024	Akmal Nasrullah Mohd Nasir (2023–2025); Abdul Rahman Mohamad (2025–present)	Anwar Ibrahim (I)
	Fadillah Yusof (b. 1962) (Deputy Prime Minister); MP for Petra Jaya	GPS (PBB)	Minister of Energy Transition and Water Transformation	7 February 2024	Incumbent	Akmal Nasrullah Mohd Nasir (2023–2025); Abdul Rahman Mohamad (2025–present)	Anwar Ibrahim (I)

=== Public utilities ===
The following individuals have been appointed as Minister of Public Utilities, or any of its precedent titles:

Political party: GPS

Portrait	Name (Birth–Death) Constituency	Political party	Title	Took office	Left office	Deputy Minister	Prime Minister (Cabinet)
	Fadillah Yusof (b. 1962) (Deputy Prime Minister); MP for Petra Jaya	GPS (PBB)	Minister of Energy Transition and Public Utilities	12 December 2023	7 February 2024	Akmal Nasrullah Mohd Nasir	Anwar Ibrahim (I)

=== Public amenities ===
The following individuals have been appointed as Minister of Public Amenities, or any of its precedent titles:

Political party: Alliance Party/BN

Portrait	Name (Birth–Death) Constituency	Political party	Title	Took office	Left office	Deputy Minister	Prime Minister (Cabinet)
	Abdul Ghani Gilong (1932–2021); MP for Kinabalu	BN (USNO)	Minister of Works and Public Amenities	5 March 1976	27 July 1978	Goh Cheng Teik	Hussein Onn (I)
	Lee San Choon (1935–2023); MP for Segamat	BN (MCA)	Minister of Works and Public Amenities	28 July 1978	15 September 1980	Nik Hussein Wan Abdul Rahman	Hussein Onn (II)
	Samy Vellu (1937–2022); MP for Sungai Siput	BN (MIC)	Minister of Works and Public Amenities	16 September 1980	7 June 1983	Nik Hussein Wan Abdul Rahman (1980–1981); Clarence Elong Mansul (1981); Nik Hussein Wan Abdul Rahman (1981–1983)	Hussein Onn (II); Mahathir Mohamad (I • II)

=== Water/water transformation ===
The following individuals have been appointed as Minister of Water, or any of its precedent titles:

Political party: BN PH PN

Portrait	Name (Birth–Death) Constituency	Political party	Title	Took office	Left office	Deputy Minister	Prime Minister (Cabinet)
	Leo Moggie Irok (b. 1941); MP for Kanowit	BN (PBDS)	Minister of Energy, Water and Communications	15 December 1999	26 March 2004	Tan Chai Ho	Mahathir Mohamad (VI); Abdullah Ahmad Badawi (I)
	Lim Keng Yaik (1939–2012); MP for Beruas	BN (Gerakan)	Minister of Energy, Water and Communications	27 March 2004	18 March 2008	Shaziman Abu Mansor	Abdullah Ahmad Badawi (II)
	Shaziman Abu Mansor (b. 1964); MP for Tampin	BN (UMNO)	Minister of Energy, Water and Communications	19 March 2008	9 April 2009	Joseph Salang Gandum	Abdullah Ahmad Badawi (III)
	Peter Chin Fah Kui (b. 1945); MP for Miri	BN (SUPP)	Minister of Energy, Green Technology and Water	10 April 2009	15 May 2013	Noriah Kasnon	Najib Razak (I)
	Maximus Ongkili (b. 1953); MP for Kota Marudu	BN (PBS)	Minister of Energy, Green Technology and Water	16 May 2013	9 May 2018	Mahdzir Khalid (2013–2015); James Dawos Mamit (2015–2018)	Najib Razak (II)
	Xavier Jayakumar Arulanandam (b. 1953); MP for Kuala Langat	PH (PKR)	Minister of Water, Land and Natural Resources	2 July 2018	24 February 2020	Tengku Zulpuri Shah Raja Puji	Mahathir Mohamad (VII)
	Tuan Ibrahim Tuan Man (b. 1960); MP for Kubang Kerian	PN (PAS)	Minister of Environment and Water	10 March 2020	24 November 2022	Mansor Othman (2020–2021); Ahmad Masrizal Muhammad (2021–2022)	Muhyiddin Yassin (I); Ismail Sabri Yaakob (I)
	Fadillah Yusof (b. 1962) (Deputy Prime Minister); MP for Petra Jaya	GPS (PBB)	Minister of Energy Transition and Water Transformation	7 February 2024	Incumbent	Akmal Nasrullah Mohd Nasir (2023–2025); Abdul Rahman Mohamad (2025–present)	Anwar Ibrahim (I)

== See also ==
- Minister of Energy, Science, Technology, Environment and Climate Change (Malaysia)
