= Deputy Minister of Transport (Malaysia) =

Malaysian government deputy minister

- Timbalan Menteri Pengangkutan
- Coat of Arms of Government of Malaysia
- Incumbent; Hasbi Habibollah since 10 December 2022
- Ministry of Transport
- Style: Yang Berhormat Timbalan Menteri (The Honourable Deputy Minister)
- Member of: Cabinet of Malaysia
- Reports to: Prime Minister; Minister of Transport
- Seat: Kuala Lumpur
- Appointer: Yang di-Pertuan Agong; on advice of the Prime Minister
- Term length: No fixed term
- Inaugural holder: Richard Ho Ung Hun (as Deputy Minister of Works and Transport)

The Deputy Minister of Transport (Malay: Timbalan Menteri Pengangkutan; Chinese: 交通部副部长; Tamil: போக்குவரத்து துணை அமைச்சர்) is a Malaysian cabinet position serving as deputy head of the Ministry of Transport.

== List of Deputy Ministers of Transport ==
The following individuals have been appointed as Deputy Minister of Transport, or any of its precedent titles:

Colour key (for political coalition/parties):

| Coalition | Component party | Timeline |
|---|---|---|
| Barisan Nasional (BN) | Parti Pesaka Bumiputera Bersatu (PBB) | 1973–2018 |
| Barisan Nasional (BN) | Malaysian Chinese Association (MCA) | 1973–present |
| Barisan Nasional (BN) | United Malays National Organisation (UMNO) | 1973–present |
| Barisan Nasional (BN) | Parti Gerakan Rakyat Malaysia (Gerakan) | 1973–2018 |
| Barisan Nasional (BN) | Sarawak United Peoples' Party (SUPP) | –2018 |
| Barisan Nasional (BN) | Sarawak Progressive Democratic Party (SPDP) | –2018 |
| Pakatan Harapan (PH) | People's Justice Party (PKR) | 2015–present |
| Gabungan Parti Sarawak (GPS) | Parti Pesaka Bumiputera Bersatu (PBB) | 2018–present |

=== Deputy Minister of Works and Transport ===
| Portrait | Name (Birth–Death) Constituency | Political coalition | Political party | Took office | Left office | Prime Minister (Cabinet) |
|---|---|---|---|---|---|---|
| | Richard Ho Ung Hun (1927–2008); MP for Lumut | BN | MCA | | | Abdul Razak Hussein (II) |
Post spit into Deputy Minister of Works and Public Amenities and Deputy Minister of Transport
=== Deputy Minister of Transport ===
| Portrait | Name (Birth–Death) Constituency | Political coalition | Political party | Took office | Left office | Prime Minister (Cabinet) |
| | Goh Cheng Teik (?–?); MP for Nibong Tebal | BN | GERAKAN | | | Hussein Onn (II) |
| | Mohd Ali M. Shariff (?–?); MP for Kuantan | BN | UMNO | | | Hussein Onn (II) |
| | Abu Hassan Omar (1940–2018); MP for Kuala Selangor | BN | UMNO | 17 July 1981 | 16 July 1984 | Mahathir Mohamad (I · II) |
| | Rahmah Othman (?–?); MP for Nibong Tebal; MP for Shah Alam | BN | UMNO | 16 July 1984 | 7 May 1987 | Mahathir Mohamad (II · III) |
| | Zaleha Ismail (1936–2020); MP for Selayang | BN | UMNO | 20 May 1987 | 3 May 1995 | Mahathir Mohamad (III · IIII) |
| | Mohd Ali Rustam (b.1949); MP for Batu Berendam | BN | UMNO | 8 May 1995 | 12 November 1996 | Mahathir Mohamad (V) |
| | Ibrahim Saad (b.19?); MP for Tasek Gelugor | BN | UMNO | 12 November 1996 | 14 December 1999 | Mahathir Mohamad (V) |
| | Ramli Ngah Talib (b.1941); MP for Pasir Salak | BN | UMNO | 15 December 1999 | 26 March 2004 | Mahathir Mohamad (VI); Abdullah Ahmad Badawi (I) |
| | Douglas Uggah Embas (b.1956); MP for Betong | BN | PBB | 29 September 2001 | 26 March 2004 | Mahathir Mohamad (VI); Abdullah Ahmad Badawi (I) |
| | Tengku Azlan Sultan Abu Bakar (b.1949); MP for Jerantut | BN | UMNO | 27 March 2004 | 18 March 2008 | Abdullah Ahmad Badawi (II) |
| | Douglas Uggah Embas (b.1956); MP for Betong | BN | PBB | 27 March 2004 | 18 March 2008 | Abdullah Ahmad Badawi (II) |
| | Lajim Ukin (1955–2021); MP for Beaufort | BN | UMNO | 19 March 2008 | 9 April 2009 | Abdullah Ahmad Badawi (III) |
| | Abdul Rahim Bakri (b.1961); MP for Kudat | BN | UMNO | 10 April 2009 | 15 May 2013 | Mohd. Najib Abdul Razak (I) |
| | Robert Lau Hoi Chew (1942–2010); MP for Sibu | BN | SUPP | 10 April 2009 | 9 April 2010 | Mohd. Najib Abdul Razak (I) |
| | Jelaing Mersat (1948–2023); MP for Saratok | BN | SPDP | 4 June 2010 | 15 May 2013 | Mohd. Najib Abdul Razak (I) |
| | Abdul Aziz Kaprawi (b.1959); MP for Sri Gading | BN | UMNO | 16 May 2013 | 9 May 2018 | Mohd. Najib Abdul Razak (II) |
| | Kamarudin Jaffar (b.1951); MP for Bandar Tun Razak | PH | PKR | 2 July 2018 | 24 February 2020 | Mahathir Mohamad (VII) |
| | Hasbi Habibollah (b.1963); MP for Limbang | GPS | PBB | 10 March 2020 | 16 August 2021 | Muhyiddin Yassin (I) |
| | Henry Sum Agong (b.1946); MP for Lawas | GPS | PBB | 30 August 2021 | 24 November 2022 | Ismail Sabri Yaakob (I) |
| | Hasbi Habibollah (b.1963); MP for Limbang | GPS | PBB | 10 December 2022 | Incumbent | Anwar Ibrahim (I) |

== See also ==
- Minister of Transport (Malaysia)
