= Deputy Minister in the Prime Minister's Department =

Malaysian cabinet position

- Timbalan Menteri di Jabatan Perdana Menteri
- Coat of Arms of Government of Malaysia
- Incumbent; M. Kulasegaran (Law and Institutional Reforms); Marhamah Rosli (Religious Affairs); Lo Su Fui (Federal Territories) since 12 December 2023
- Prime Minister's Department
- Style: Yang Berhormat Timbalan Menteri (The Honourable Deputy Minister)
- Member of: Cabinet of Malaysia
- Reports to: Parliament of Malaysia
- Seat: Perdana Putra, Putrajaya
- Appointer: Yang di-Pertuan Agong on the recommendation of the Prime Minister
- Formation: July 1957
- First holder: Abdul Rahman Talib (Minister Without Portfolio)
- Website: www.jpm.gov.my

The Deputy Minister in the Prime Minister's Department (Malay: Timbalan Menteri di Jabatan Perdana Menteri; Chinese: 首相署副部长; Tamil: பிரதமர் துறையில் துணை அமைச்சர் ) is a Malaysian cabinet position serving as deputy head of the Prime Minister's Department.

== List of Deputy Ministers in the Prime Minister's Department ==
The following individuals have been appointed as Deputy Minister in the Prime Minister's Department, or any of its precedent titles:

Political Party: Alliance/BN PH PN GPS GRS Independent

Portrait	Name (Birth–Death) Constituency	Political party	Responsible for Supervised for	Term of office		Prime Minister (Cabinet)
	Syed Jaafar Albar (1914–1977); MP for Johore Tengah	Alliance (UMNO)	Assistant Prime Minister	November 1959	1961	Tunku Abdul Rahman (II)
	Abdul Hamid Khan (1900–1974); MP for Batang Padang	Alliance (UMNO)	Assistant Prime Minister	November 1959	1961	Tunku Abdul Rahman (II)
	Abdul Khalid Awang Osman (1925–1986); MP for Kota Star Utara	Alliance (UMNO)	Assistant Prime Minister	November 1959	1961	Tunku Abdul Rahman (II)
	Cheah Theam Swee (b. unknown); MP for Bukit Bintang	Alliance (MCA)	Assistant Prime Minister	November 1959	1961	Tunku Abdul Rahman (II)
	Abdul Khalid Awang Osman (1925–1986); MP for Kota Star Utara	Alliance (UMNO)	Assistant Minister without Portfolio	1968	1969	Tunku Abdul Rahman (III)
	Lee San Choon (1935); MP for Segamat Selatan	Alliance (MCA)	Assistant Minister without Portfolio	1969	1970	Tunku Abdul Rahman (IIII)
	Abdul Taib Mahmud (b. 1936); MP for Samarahan	Alliance (PBB)	Assistant Minister in the Prime Minister's Department	1970	1972	Abdul Razak Hussein (I)
	Wan Abdul Kadir Ismail (b. unknown); MP for Kuala Trengganu Utara	BN (UMNO)		1973	1974	Abdul Razak Hussein (I)
	Abdullah Ahmad (b. unknown); MP for Machang	BN (UMNO)		1974	1976	Abdul Razak Hussein (II)
	Kamaruddin Mohamed Isa (b. unknown); MP for Larut	BN (UMNO)		1974	1976	Abdul Razak Hussein (II)
	Kamaruddin Mohamed Isa (b. unknown); MP for Larut	BN (UMNO)		1976	16 July 1981	Hussein Onn (I · II)
	Abdullah Abdul Rahman (b. unknown); MP for Ulu Nerus	BN (UMNO)		1979	16 July 1981	Hussein Onn (I · II)
	Kamaruddin Mohamed Isa (b. unknown); MP for Larut	BN (UMNO)		16 July 1981	30 April 1982	Mahathir Mohamad (I)
	Abdullah Abdul Rahman (b. unknown); MP for Ulu Nerus	BN (UMNO)		16 July 1981	30 April 1982	Mahathir Mohamad (I)
	Goh Cheng Teik (b. unknown); MP for Nibong Tebal	BN (Gerakan)		17 July 1981	30 April 1982	Mahathir Mohamad (I)
	Anwar Ibrahim (b.1947); MP for Permatang Pauh	BN (UMNO)		30 April 1982	2 June 1983	Mahathir Mohamad (II)
	Goh Cheng Teik (b. unknown); MP for Nibong Tebal	BN (Gerakan)		30 April 1982	2 June 1983	Mahathir Mohamad (II)
	Suhaimi Kamaruddin (b. unknown); MP for Sepang	BN (UMNO)		30 April 1982	2 June 1983	Mahathir Mohamad (II)
	Shariffah Dorah Syed Mohammed (b. unknown); MP for Semerah	BN (UMNO)		30 April 1982	10 August 1986	Mahathir Mohamad (II)
	Mohamed Yusof Mohamed Noor (b. unknown); Senator; MP for Setiu	BN (UMNO)		16 July 1984	10 August 1986	Mahathir Mohamad (II)
	Mohd Radzi Sheikh Ahmad (b.1942); MP for Kangar	BN (UMNO)		2 June 1983	16 July 1984	
	Lee Kim Sai (b.1942); MP for Ulu Selangor	BN (MCA)		2 June 1983	7 January 1986	
	Tan Tiong Hong (b. unknown); MP for Raub	BN (MCA)		7 January 1986	10 August 1986	
	Siti Zaharah Sulaiman (b. unknown); MP for Mentakab	BN (UMNO)		11 August 1986	26 October 1990	Mahathir Mohamad (III)
	Mohamed Yusof Mohamed Noor (b. unknown); Senator; MP for Setiu	BN (UMNO)		11 August 1986	20 May 1987	Mahathir Mohamad (III)
	Oo Gin Sun (b.19??); MP for Alor Setar	BN (MCA)		11 August 1986	15 June 1989	Mahathir Mohamad (III)
	Raja Ariffin Raja Sulaiman (b. unknown); MP for Baling	BN (UMNO)		20 May 1987	26 October 1990	Mahathir Mohamad (III)
	Suleiman Mohamed (b. unknown); MP for Titiwangsa	BN (UMNO)		20 May 1987	26 October 1990	Mahathir Mohamad (III)
	Ting Chew Peh (b. unknown); MP for Gopeng	BN (MCA)		15 June 1989	26 October 1990	Mahathir Mohamad (III)
	Abdul Hamid Othman (b.unknown); MP for Sik	BN (UMNO)		27 October 1990	3 May 1995	Mahathir Mohamad (IIII)
	Raja Ariffin Raja Sulaiman (b.19??); MP for Baling	BN (UMNO)		27 October 1990	3 May 1995	Mahathir Mohamad (IIII)
	Suleiman Mohamed (b.19??); Titiwangsa	BN (UMNO)		27 October 1990	3 May 1995	Mahathir Mohamad (IIII)
	Wong See Wah (b. unknown); MP for Rasah	BN (MCA)		27 October 1990	3 May 1995	Mahathir Mohamad (IIII)
	Mohamed Nazri Abdul Aziz (b.1954); MP for Chenderoh	BN (UMNO)		8 May 1995	12 November 1996	Mahathir Mohamad (V)
	Raja Ariffin Raja Sulaiman (b.19??); MP for Baling	BN (UMNO)		8 May 1995	12 November 1996	Mahathir Mohamad (V)
	Ibrahim Saad (b.19??); MP for Tasek Gelugor	BN (UMNO)		8 May 1995	12 November 1996	Mahathir Mohamad (V)
	Ibrahim Ali (b. 1954); Senator	BN (UMNO)		12 November 1996	14 December 1999	Mahathir Mohamad (V)
	Fauzi Abdul Rahman (b.1946); MP for Kuantan	BN (UMNO)		12 November 1996	14 December 1999	Mahathir Mohamad (V)
	Tengku Azlan Sultan Abu Bakar (b. 1949); MP for Jerantut	BN (UMNO)		15 December 1999	2 November 2003	Mahathir Mohamad (VI)
	Shahrizat Abdul Jalil (b.1953); MP for Lembah Pantai	BN (UMNO)		15 December 1999	17 January 2001	Mahathir Mohamad (VI)
	Douglas Uggah Embas (b.1955); MP for Betong	BN (PBB)		15 December 1999	17 January 2001	Mahathir Mohamad (VI)
	Tengku Adnan Tengku Mansor (b.1950); Senator	BN (UMNO)		17 January 2001	21 November 2002	Mahathir Mohamad (VI)
	Tengku Azlan Sultan Abu Bakar (b.1949); MP for Jerantut	BN (UMNO)		3 November 2003	26 March 2004	Abdullah Ahmad Badawi (I)
	M. Kayveas (b.1954); Senator	BN (PPP)	Legal Affairs Division	3 November 2003	26 March 2004	Abdullah Ahmad Badawi (I)
	M. Kayveas (b.1954); MP for Taiping	BN (PPP)		27 March 2004	18 March 2008	Abdullah Ahmad Badawi (II)
	Joseph Entulu Belaun (b.1954); MP for Selangau	BN (PBDS)		27 March 2004	18 March 2008	Abdullah Ahmad Badawi (II)
	Joseph Entulu Belaun (b.1954); MP for Selangau	BN (PRS)		27 March 2004	18 March 2008	Abdullah Ahmad Badawi (II)
	Abdul Raman Suliman (b.1946); Senator	BN (UMNO)		14 February 2006	18 March 2008	Abdullah Ahmad Badawi (II)
	Hasan Malek (b.1946); MP for Kuala Pilah	BN (UMNO)		19 March 2008	9 April 2009	Abdullah Ahmad Badawi (III)
	Mohd Johari Baharum (b.1954); MP for Kubang Pasu	BN (UMNO)		19 March 2008	9 April 2009	Abdullah Ahmad Badawi (III)
	Mashitah Ibrahim (b.1964); Senator	BN (UMNO)		19 March 2008	9 April 2009	Abdullah Ahmad Badawi (III)
	Devamany Krishnasamy (b.1957); MP for Cameron Highlands	BN (MIC)		19 March 2008	9 April 2009	Abdullah Ahmad Badawi (III)
	Murugiah Thopasamy (b.19??); Senator	BN (PPP)		19 March 2008	9 April 2009	Abdullah Ahmad Badawi (III)
	Devamany Krishnasamy (b. 1957); MP for Cameron Highlands	BN (MIC)		10 April 2009	15 May 2013	Najib Razak (I)
	Mashitah Ibrahim (b. 1964); Senator	BN (UMNO)		10 April 2009	15 May 2013	Najib Razak (I)
	Murugiah Thopasamy (b. unknown); Senator	BN (PPP)		10 April 2009	15 May 2013	Najib Razak (I)
	Liew Vui Keong (1960–2020); MP for Sandakan	BN (LDP)		10 April 2009	15 May 2013	Najib Razak (I)
	Ahmad Maslan (b. 1966); MP for Pontian	BN (UMNO)		10 April 2009	15 May 2013	Najib Razak (I)
	Waytha Moorthy Ponnusamy (b. 1966); Senator	Independent		16 May 2013	8 February 2014	Najib Razak (II)
	Razali Ibrahim (b. 1970); MP for Muar	BN (UMNO)	Malaysian Anti-Corruption Commission (MACC)	16 May 2013	9 May 2018	Najib Razak (II)
	Asyraf Wajdi Dusuki (b. 1976); Senator	BN (UMNO)		29 July 2015	9 May 2018	Najib Razak (II)
	Devamany Krishnasamy (b. 1957); Senator	BN (MIC)		27 June 2016	9 May 2018	Najib Razak (II)
	Fuziah Salleh (b. 1959); MP for Kuantan	PH (PKR)	Religious Affairs	2 July 2018	24 February 2020	Mahathir Mohamad (VII)
	Mohamed Hanipa Maidin (b. 1969); MP for Sepang	PH (AMANAH)	Legal Affairs	2 July 2018	24 February 2020	Mahathir Mohamad (VII)
	Mohamed Farid Md Rafik (1976–2019); MP for Tanjung Piai	PH (BERSATU)	National Unity and Social Wellbeing	2 July 2018	21 September 2019	Mahathir Mohamad (VII)
	Arthur Joseph Kurup (b. 1982); MP for Pensiangan	BN (PBRS)	Economy	10 March 2020	16 August 2021	Muhyiddin Yassin (I)
	Mastura Mohd Yazid (b. 1961); MP for Kuala Kangsar	BN (UMNO)	Special Functions	10 March 2020	16 August 2021	Muhyiddin Yassin (I)
	Eddin Syazlee Shith (b. 1974); MP for Kuala Pilah	PN (BERSATU)	Parliament and Law	10 March 2020	6 July 2020	Muhyiddin Yassin (I)
	Shabudin Yahaya (b. 1965); MP for Tasek Gelugor	PN (BERSATU)	Parliament and Law	6 July 2020	16 August 2021	Muhyiddin Yassin (I)
	Ahmad Marzuk Shaary (b. 1975); MP for Pengkalan Chepa	PN (PAS)	Religious Affairs	10 March 2020	16 August 2021	Muhyiddin Yassin (I)
	Hanifah Hajar Taib (b. 1972); MP for Mukah	GPS (PBB)	Sabah and Sarawak Affairs	10 March 2020	16 August 2021	Muhyiddin Yassin (I)
	Mastura Mohd Yazid (b. 1961); MP for Kuala Kangsar	BN (UMNO)	Special Functions	30 August 2021	24 November 2022	Ismail Sabri Yaakob (I)
	Eddin Syazlee Shith (b.1974); MP for Kuala Pilah	PN (BERSATU)	Economy	30 August 2021	24 November 2022	Ismail Sabri Yaakob (I)
	Ahmad Marzuk Shaary (b.1975); MP for Pengkalan Chepa	PN (PAS)	Religious Affairs	30 August 2021	24 November 2022	Ismail Sabri Yaakob (I)
	Mas Ermieyati Samsudin (b.1975); MP for Masjid Tanah	PN (BERSATU)	Parliament and Law	30 August 2021	24 November 2022	Ismail Sabri Yaakob (I)
	Hanifah Hajar Taib (b.1972); MP for Mukah	GPS (PBB)	Sabah and Sarawak Affairs	30 August 2021	24 November 2022	Ismail Sabri Yaakob (I)
	Ramkarpal Singh (b. 1976); MP for Bukit Gelugor	PH (DAP)	Law and Institutional Reforms	10 December 2022	12 December 2023	Anwar Ibrahim (I)
	Wilson Ugak Kumbong (b.19?); MP for Hulu Rajang	GPS (PRS)	Sabah and Sarawak Affairs; Special Duties	10 December 2022	12 December 2023	Anwar Ibrahim (I)
	M. Kulasegaran (b.1957); MP for Ipoh Barat	PH (DAP)	Law and Institutional Reforms	12 December 2023	Incumbent	Anwar Ibrahim (I)
	Zulkifli Hasan (b.1977); Senator	Independent	Religious Affairs	12 December 2023	17 December 2025	Anwar Ibrahim (I)
	Marhamah Rosli (b.19??); Senator	Independent	Religious Affairs	17 December 2025	Incumbent	Anwar Ibrahim (I)
	Lo Su Fui (b.1981); MP for Tawau	GRS (PBS)	Federal Territories	17 December 2025	Incumbent	Anwar Ibrahim (I)

== See also ==
- Minister in the Prime Minister's Department
