= Deputy Minister of Agriculture and Food Security (Malaysia) =

Malaysian government deputy minister

- Timbalan Menteri Pertanian dan Keterjaminan Makanan
- Coat of Arms of Government of Malaysia

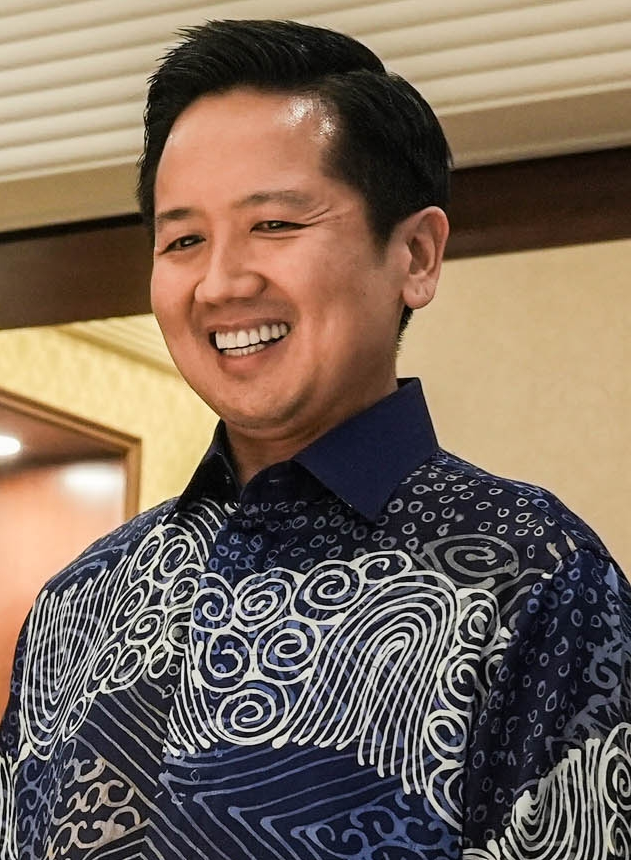
- Incumbent; Arthur Joseph Kurup since 12 December 2023
- Ministry of Agriculture and Food Security
- Style: Yang Berhormat
- Member of: Cabinet of Malaysia
- Reports to: Prime Minister; Minister of Agriculture and Food Security
- Seat: Putrajaya
- Appointer: Yang di-Pertuan Agong on advice of the Prime Minister
- Inaugural holder: Mohd Khir Johari (as Assistant Minister of Agriculture and Co-operatives)

The Deputy Minister of Agriculture and Food Security (Malay: Timbalan Menteri Pertanian dan Keterjaminan Makanan; Chinese: 农业及粮食安全部副部长; Tamil: வேளாண்மை மற்றும் உணவுப் பாதுகாப்பு துணை அமைச்சர்) is a Malaysian cabinet position serving as deputy head of the Ministry of Agriculture and Food Security.

== List of Deputy Ministers of Agriculture and Food Security ==
The following individuals have been appointed as Deputy Minister of Agriculture and Food Security, or any of its precedent titles:

Colour key (for political coalition/parties):

Coalition	Component party	Timeline
Alliance Party	United Malays National Organisation (UMNO)	1957–1973
Barisan Nasional (BN)	United Malays National Organisation (UMNO)	1973–present
Barisan Nasional (BN)	Sarawak National Party (SNAP)	1976–2004
Barisan Nasional (BN)	Parti Gerakan Rakyat Malaysia (Gerakan)	1973–2018
Barisan Nasional (BN)	Malaysian Chinese Association (MCA)	1973–present
Barisan Nasional (BN)	Malaysian Indian Congress (MIC)	1973–present
Barisan Nasional (BN)	Parti Pesaka Bumiputera Bersatu (PBB)	–2018
Barisan Nasional (BN)	Progressive Democratic Party (PDP)	–2018
Barisan Nasional (BN)	Parti Bersatu Rakyat Sabah (PBRS)	
Pakatan Harapan (PH)	People's Justice Party (PKR)	2015–present
Pakatan Harapan (PH)	Democratic Action Party (DAP)	2015–present
Perikatan Nasional (PN)	Malaysian United Indigenous Party (BERSATU)	2020–present
Perikatan Nasional (PN)	Malaysian Islamic Party (PAS)	2020–present

=== Assistant Minister of Agriculture and Co-operatives (1955–1957) ===
Portrait	Name (Birth–Death) Constituency	Political coalition	Political party	Took office	Left office	Prime Minister (Cabinet)
	Mohd Khir Johari (1923–2006); MP for Kedah Tengah	Alliance	UMNO	1955	1957	Tunku Abdul Rahman (I)
	Sulaiman Bulon (born ?); MP for Bagan Datoh	Alliance	UMNO			Tunku Abdul Rahman (III)
Post renamed into Deputy Minister of Agriculture and Rural Development
=== Deputy Minister of Agriculture and Rural Development ===
Portrait	Name (Birth–Death) Constituency	Political coalition	Political party	Took office	Left office	Prime Minister (Cabinet)
	Mustapha Abdul Jabar (born ?); MP for Sabak Bernam	BN	UMNO			Abdul Razak Hussein (II)
Post renamed into Deputy Minister of Agriculture
=== Deputy Minister of Agriculture (1976–2004) ===
Portrait	Name (Birth–Death) Constituency	Political coalition	Political party	Took office	Left office	Prime Minister (Cabinet)
	Mustapha Abdul Jabar (born ?); MP for Sabak Bernam	BN	UMNO	1976	1978	Hussein Onn (I)
	Edmund Langgu Saga (born ?); MP for Saratok	BN	SNAP	1978		Hussein Onn (I)
	Edmund Langgu Saga (born ?); MP for Saratok	BN	SNAP		1981	Hussein Onn (II)
	Zakaria Abdul Rahman (born ?); MP for Besut	BN	UMNO			Hussein Onn (II)
	Suhaimi Kamaruddin (born ?); MP for Sepang	BN	UMNO		1981	Hussein Onn (II)
	Edmund Langgu Saga (born ?); MP for Saratok	BN	SNAP	16 July 1981	30 April 1982	Mahathir Mohamad (I)
	Chin Hon Ngian (born ?); MP for Renggam	BN	MCA	30 April 1982	2 June 1983	Mahathir Mohamad (II)
	Luhat Wan (born ?); MP for Baram	BN	SNAP	30 April 1982	10 August 1986	Mahathir Mohamad (II)
	Goh Cheng Teik (born ?); MP for Nilong Tebal	BN	Gerakan	2 June 1983	10 August 1986	Mahathir Mohamad (II)
	Alexander Lee Yu Lung (born ?); MP for Batu	BN	Gerakan	11 August 1986	14 August 1989	Mahathir Mohamad (III)
	Luhat Wan (born ?); MP for Baram	BN	SNAP	11 August 1986	20 May 1987	Mahathir Mohamad (III)
	Mohd. Kassim Ahmed (born ?); MP for Machang	BN	UMNO	20 May 1987	26 October 1990	Mahathir Mohamad (III)
	Subramaniam Sinniah (1944–2022); MP for Segamat	BN	MIC	20 May 1987	26 October 1990	Mahathir Mohamad (III)
	T. Marimuthu (born ?); MP for Telok Kemang	BN	MIC	1 December 1993	3 May 1995	Mahathir Mohamad (IIII)
	Tengku Mahmud Tengku Mansor (born ?); MP for Setiu	BN	UMNO	8 May 1995	14 December 1999	Mahathir Mohamad (V)
	Mohd Shariff Omar (born ?); MP for Tasek Gelugor	BN	UMNO	15 December 1999	26 March 2004	Mahathir Mohamad (VI); Abdullah Ahmad Badawi (I)
Post renamed into Deputy Minister of Agriculture and Agro-based Industry
=== Deputy Minister of Agriculture and Agro-based Industry (2004–2020) ===
Portrait	Name (Birth–Death) Constituency	Political coalition	Political party	Took office	Left office	Prime Minister (Cabinet)
	Mohd Shariff Omar (born ?); MP for Tasek Gelugor	BN	UMNO	27 March 2004	18 March 2008	Abdullah Ahmad Badawi (II)
	Kerk Choo Ting (1941–2018); MP for Simpang Renggam	BN	Gerakan	27 March 2004	14 February 2006	Abdullah Ahmad Badawi (II)
	Mah Siew Keong (b. 1961); MP for Telok Intan	BN	Gerakan	14 February 2006	18 March 2008	Abdullah Ahmad Badawi (II)
	Rohani Abdul Karim (b. 1955); MP for Batang Lupar	BN	PBB	19 March 2008	9 April 2009	Abdullah Ahmad Badawi (III)
	Mohd Johari Baharum (b. 1954); MP for Kubang Pasu	BN	UMNO	10 April 2009	15 May 2013	Najib Razak (I)
	Rohani Abdul Karim (b. 1955); MP for Batang Lupar	BN	PBB	10 April 2009	4 June 2010	Najib Razak (I)
	Chua Tee Yong (b. 1977); MP for Labis	BN	MCA	4 June 2010	15 May 2013	Najib Razak (I)
	Tajuddin Abdul Rahman (b. 1948); MP for Pasir Salak	BN	UMNO	16 May 2013	9 May 2018	Najib Razak (II)
	Nogeh Gumbek (b. ?); MP for Mas Gading	BN	PDP	29 July 2015	9 May 2018	Najib Razak (II)
	Sim Tze Tzin (b. 1976); MP for Bayan Baru	PH	PKR	2 July 2018	24 February 2020	Mahathir Mohamad (VII)
Post renamed into Deputy Minister of Agriculture and Food Industries
=== Deputy Minister of Agriculture and Food Industries (2020–2022) ===
Portrait	Name (Birth–Death) Constituency	Political coalition	Political party	Took office	Left office	Prime Minister (Cabinet)
	Ahmad Hamzah (b. 1948); MP for Jasin	BN	UMNO	10 March 2020	24 November 2022	Muhyiddin Yassin (I); Ismail Sabri Yaakob (I)
	Che Abdullah Mat Nawi (b. 1960); MP for Tumpat	PN	PAS	10 March 2020	16 August 2021	Muhyiddin Yassin (I); Ismail Sabri Yaakob (I)
	Nik Muhammad Zawawi Salleh (b. 1967); MP for Pasir Puteh	PN	PAS	30 August 2021	24 November 2022	Muhyiddin Yassin (I); Ismail Sabri Yaakob (I)
Post renamed into Deputy Minister of Agriculture and Food Security
=== Deputy Minister of Agriculture and Food Security (2022–present) ===
Portrait	Name (Birth–Death) Constituency	Political coalition	Political party	Took office	Left office	Prime Minister (Cabinet)
	Chan Foong Hin (b.1978); MP for Kota Kinabalu	PH	DAP	10 December 2022	12 December 2023	Anwar Ibrahim (I)
	Arthur Joseph Kurup (b.1982); MP for Pensiangan	BN	PBRS	12 December 2023	Incumbent	Anwar Ibrahim (I)

== See also ==
- Minister of Agriculture and Food Security (Malaysia)
