= Deputy Minister of Health (Malaysia) =

Malaysian government deputy minister

- Timbalan Menteri Kesihatan
- Coat of Arms of Government of Malaysia
- Incumbent; Lukanisman Awang Sauni since 10 December 2022
- Ministry of Health
- Style: Yang Berhormat
- Member of: Cabinet of Malaysia
- Reports to: Prime Minister; Minister of Health
- Seat: Putrajaya
- Appointer: Yang di-Pertuan Agong on advice of the Prime Minister
- Inaugural holder: Abdul Rahman Talib (as Assistant Minister of Health)

The Deputy Minister of Health (Malay: Timbalan Menteri Kesihatan; Chinese: 卫生部副部长; Tamil: சுகாதார பிரதி அமைச்சர் ) is a Malaysian cabinet position serving as deputy head of the Ministry of Health.

== List of deputy ministers of health ==
The following individuals have been appointed Deputy Minister of Health, or any of its precedent titles:

Colour key (for political coalition/parties):

Coalition	Component party	Timeline
Alliance Party	United Malays National Organisation (UMNO)	1955–1973
Barisan Nasional (BN)	United Malays National Organisation (UMNO)	1973–present
Barisan Nasional (BN)	Parti Pesaka Bumiputera Bersatu (PBB)	1973–2018
Barisan Nasional (BN)	Malaysian Islamic Party (PAS)	1974–1977
Barisan Nasional (BN)	Malaysian Indian Congress (MIC)	1973–present
Pakatan Harapan (PH)	People's Justice Party (PKR)	2015–present
Perikatan Nasional (PN)	Malaysian United Indigenous Party (BERSATU)	2020–present
Gabungan Parti Sarawak (GPS)	Parti Pesaka Bumiputera Bersatu (PBB)	2018–present
Gabungan Parti Sarawak (GPS)	Parti Rakyat Sarawak (PRS)	2018–present

=== Assistant Minister of Health ===
Portrait	Name (Birth–Death) Constituency	Political coalition	Political party	Took office	Left office	Prime Minister (Cabinet)
	Abdul Rahman Talib (1916–1968); MP for Pahang Timor	Alliance	UMNO	9 August 1955	28 February 1956	Tunku Abdul Rahman (I)
post was renamed to Deputy Minister of Health
=== Deputy Minister of Health ===
Portrait	Name (Birth–Death) Constituency	Political coalition	Political party	Took office	Left office	Prime Minister (Cabinet)
	Abu Bakar Umar (?–?); MP for Kota Setar	BN	PAS	1974	31 December 1977	Abdul Razak Hussein (II); Hussein Onn (I)
	Sulaiman Daud (1933–2010); MP for Santubong	BN	PBB	1 January 1978	16 July 1981	Hussein Onn (I · II)
	K. Pathmanaban (?–2001); MP for Telok Kemang	BN	MIC	17 July 1981	20 May 1987	Mahathir Mohamad (I · II · III)
	Mohamed Farid Ariffin (?–?); Senator; MP for Balik Pulau	BN	UMNO	20 May 1987	3 May 1995	Mahathir Mohamad (III · IIII)
	Siti Zaharah Sulaiman (1949–2024); MP for Paya Besar	BN	UMNO	8 May 1995	12 November 1996	Mahathir Mohamad (V)
	Mohd Ali Rustam (b.1949); MP for Batu Berendam	BN	UMNO	12 November 1996	14 December 1999	Mahathir Mohamad (V)
	Suleiman Mohamed (b.?–?); MP for Titiwangsa	BN	UMNO	15 December 1999	26 March 2004	Mahathir Mohamad (VI); Abdullah Ahmad Badawi (I)
	Abdul Latiff Ahmad (b.1958); MP for Mersing	BN	UMNO	27 March 2004	9 April 2009	Abdullah Ahmad Badawi (II · III)
	Rosnah Abdul Rashid Shirlin (b.1972); MP for Papar	BN	UMNO	10 April 2009	15 May 2013	Najib Razak (I)
	Hilmi Yahaya (b.1948); MP for Balik Pulau	BN	UMNO	16 May 2013	9 May 2018	Najib Razak (II)
	Lee Boon Chye (b.1959); MP for Gopeng	PH	PKR	2 July 2018	24 February 2020	Mahathir Mohamad (VII)
	Noor Azmi Ghazali (b.1960); MP for Bagan Serai	PN	BERSATU	10 March 2020	24 November 2022	Muhyiddin Yassin (I); Ismail Sabri Yaakob (I)
	Aaron Ago Dagang (b.1958); MP for Kanowit	GPS	PRS	10 March 2020	24 November 2022	Muhyiddin Yassin (I); Ismail Sabri Yaakob (I)
	Lukanisman Awang Sauni (b.1982); MP for Sibuti	GPS	PBB	10 December 2022	Incumbent	Anwar Ibrahim (I)

== See also ==
- Minister of Health (Malaysia)
