= Sixth Mahathir cabinet =

Malaysian government, 1999-

- 14th Cabinet of Malaysia

- Date formed: 15 December 1999
- Date dissolved: 2 November 2003

People and organisations
- Head of state: Tuanku Salahuddin Abdul Aziz Shah (1999–2001); Tuanku Syed Sirajuddin (2001–2003)
- Head of government: Mahathir Mohamad
- Deputy head of government: Abdullah Ahmad Badawi
- Member parties: Barisan Nasional: United Malays National Organisation; Malaysian Chinese Association; United Traditional Bumiputera Party; Malaysian Indian Congress; Malaysian People's Movement Party; Sarawak Native People's Party; Sarawak United Peoples' Party; Sarawak National Party; United Pasokmomogun Kadazandusun Murut Organisation; Liberal Democratic Party; Sabah Progressive Party; United Sabah Party (from 2002); Sarawak Progressive Democratic Party (from 2002)
- Status in legislature: Coalition government
- Opposition parties: Pan-Malaysian Islamic Party; Democratic Action Party; People's Justice Party; United Sabah Party (1999–2002)
- Opposition leader: Fadzil Noor (1999–2002); Abdul Hadi Awang (2002–2003)

History
- Election: 1999 Malaysian general election
- Legislature term: 10th Malaysian Parliament
- Budgets: 2000, 2001, 2002, 2003, 2004
- Predecessor: Fifth Mahathir cabinet
- Successor: First Abdullah cabinet

Mahathir Mohamad formed the sixth Mahathir cabinet after being invited by Tuanku Salahuddin Abdul Aziz Shah to begin a new government following the 29 November 1999 general election in Malaysia. Prior to the election, Mahathir led (as Prime Minister) the fifth Mahathir cabinet, a coalition government that consisted of members of the component parties of Barisan Nasional. It was the 14th cabinet of Malaysia formed since independence.

This is a list of the members of the sixth cabinet of the fourth Prime Minister of Malaysia, Mahathir Mohamad.

== Composition ==
=== Full members ===
The federal cabinet consisted of the following ministers:

Portfolio	Office Bearer	Party	Constituency	Term start	Term end
Prime Minister	Dato' Seri Dr. Mahathir Mohamad MP	UMNO	Kubang Pasu	15 December 1999	2 November 2003
Deputy Prime Minister	Dato' Seri Abdullah Ahmad Badawi MP	UMNO	Kepala Batas	15 December 1999	2 November 2003
Minister in the Prime Minister's Department	Dato' Seri Utama Rais Yatim MP	UMNO	Jelebu	15 December 1999	2 November 2003
Minister in the Prime Minister's Department	Tan Sri Abdul Hamid Othman	UMNO	Senator	15 December 1999	29 September 2001
Minister in the Prime Minister's Department	Tan Sri Pandikar Amin Mulia	AKAR; UMNO	Senator	15 December 1999	21 November 2002
Minister in the Prime Minister's Department	Tan Sri Bernard Giluk Dompok MP	UPKO	Kinabalu	15 December 1999	2 November 2003
Minister in the Prime Minister's Department	Dato' Seri Abdul Hamid Zainal Abidin	UMNO	Senator	17 January 2001	2 November 2003
Minister in the Prime Minister's Department	Dato' Tengku Adnan Tengku Mansor	UMNO	Senator	21 November 2002	2 November 2003
Minister with Special Functions	Tun Daim Zainuddin MP	UMNO	Merbok	15 December 1999	31 May 2001
Minister of Finance	Tun Daim Zainuddin MP	UMNO	Merbok	15 December 1999	31 May 2001
Minister of Finance	Dato' Seri Dr. Mahathir Mohamad MP	UMNO	Kubang Pasu	5 June 2001	2 November 2003
Minister of Finance	Dato' Jamaluddin Jarjis MP	UMNO	Rompin	20 November 2002	2 November 2003
Minister of Defence	Dato' Sri Mohd. Najib Abdul Razak MP	UMNO	Pekan	15 December 1999	2 November 2003
Minister of Home Affairs	Dato' Seri Abdullah Ahmad Badawi MP	UMNO	Kepala Batas	15 December 1999	2 November 2003
Minister of International Trade and Industry	Dato' Seri Rafidah Aziz MP	UMNO	Kuala Kangsar	15 December 1999	2 November 2003
Minister of Education	Tan Sri Musa Mohamad	UMNO	Senator	15 December 1999	2 November 2003
Minister of Lands and Co-operatives Development	Tan Sri Datuk Kasitah Gaddam	UMNO	Senator	15 December 1999	2 November 2003
Minister of Transport	Dato' Seri Ling Liong Sik MP	MCA	Labis	15 December 1999	23 May 2003
Minister of Transport	Dato' Sri Chan Kong Choy MP	MCA	Selayang	1 July 2003	2 November 2003
Minister of Agriculture	Dato Sri Mohd Effendi Norwawi MP	PBB	Kuala Rajang	15 December 1999	2 November 2003
Minister of Health	Dato' Chua Jui Meng MP	MCA	Bakri	15 December 1999	2 November 2003
Minister of Culture, Arts and Tourism	Dato' Sri Abdul Kadir Sheikh Fadzir MP	UMNO	Kulim-Bandar Baharu	15 December 1999	2 November 2003
Minister of Housing and Local Government	Dato' Seri Ong Ka Ting MP	MCA	Pontian	15 December 1999	2 November 2003
Minister of Foreign Affairs	Dato' Syed Hamid Albar MP	UMNO	Kota Tinggi	15 December 1999	2 November 2003
Minister of Human Resources	Datuk Wira Fong Chan Onn MP	MCA	Selandar	15 December 1999	2 November 2003
Minister of Domestic Trade and Consumerism	Tan Sri Dato' Haji Muhyiddin Mohd. Yassin MP	UMNO	Pagoh	15 December 1999	2 November 2003
Minister of Entrepreneur Development	Dato' Seri Mohamed Nazri Abdul Aziz MP	UMNO	Chenderoh	15 December 1999	2 November 2003
Minister of Rural Development	Dato' Azmi Khalid MP	UMNO	Padang Besar	15 December 1999	2 November 2003
Minister of Works	Dato' Seri Samy Vellu MP	MIC	Sungai Siput	15 December 1999	2 November 2003
Minister of Science, Technology and Environment	Dato' Seri Law Hieng Ding MP	SUPP	Sarikei	15 December 1999	2 November 2003
Minister of Energy, Water and Communications	Dato Sri Leo Moggie Irok MP	PBDS	Kanowit	15 December 1999	2 November 2003
Minister of Primary Industries	Dato' Seri Lim Keng Yaik MP	Gerakan	Beruas	15 December 1999	2 November 2003
Minister of National Unity and Community Development	Dato' Siti Zaharah Sulaiman MP	UMNO	Paya Besar	15 December 1999	2 November 2003
Minister of Women and Family Development	Dato' Seri Shahrizat Abdul Jalil MP	UMNO	Lembah Pantai	29 September 2001	2 November 2003
Minister of Youth and Sports	Dato' Hishammuddin Hussein MP	UMNO	Tenggara	15 December 1999	2 November 2003
Minister of Information	Dato' Sri Mohd Khalil Yaakob MP	UMNO	Kuantan	15 December 1999	2 November 2003

=== Deputy ministers ===
Portfolio	Office Bearer	Party	Constituency	Term start	Term end
Deputy Minister in the Prime Minister's Department	Dato' Seri Tengku Azlan Sultan Abu Bakar MP	UMNO	Jerantut	15 December 1999	2 November 2003
Deputy Minister in the Prime Minister's Department	Dato' Shahrizat Abdul Jalil MP	UMNO	Lembah Pantai	15 December 1999	17 January 2001
Deputy Minister in the Prime Minister's Department	Datuk Douglas Uggah Embas MP	PBB	Betong	15 December 1999	17 January 2001
Deputy Minister in the Prime Minister's Department	Dato' Tengku Adnan Tengku Mansor	UMNO	Senator	17 January 2001	21 November 2002
Deputy Minister of Finance	Dato' Shafie Salleh MP	UMNO	Kuala Langat	15 December 1999	2 November 2003
Deputy Minister of Finance	Dato' Chan Kong Choy MP	MCA	Selayang	15 December 1999	1 July 2003
Deputy Minister of Finance	Dato' Ng Yen Yen MP	MCA	Raub	1 July 2003	2 November 2003
Deputy Minister of Defence	Datuk Mohd Shafie Apdal MP	UMNO	Semporna	15 December 1999	2 November 2003
Deputy Minister of Home Affairs	Dato' Zainal Abidin Zin MP	UMNO	Bagan Serai	15 December 1999	2 November 2003
Deputy Minister of International Trade and Industry	Dato' Seri Kerk Choo Ting MP	Gerakan	Taiping	15 December 1999	2 November 2003
Deputy Minister of Education	Dato' Abdul Aziz Shamsuddin MP	UMNO	Senator	15 December 1999	2 November 2003
Deputy Minister of Education	Han Choon Kim MP	MCA	Seremban	15 December 1999	2 November 2003
Deputy Minister of Lands and Co-operatives Development	Tan Kee Kwong MP	Gerakan	Segambut	15 December 1999	2 November 2003
Deputy Minister of Transport	Tan Sri Dato' Seri Diraja Ramli Ngah Talib MP	UMNO	Pasir Salak	15 December 1999	2 November 2003
Deputy Minister of Transport	Datuk Douglas Uggah Embas MP	PBB	Betong	29 September 2001	2 November 2003
Deputy Minister of Agriculture	Dato' Seri Mohd Shariff Omar MP	UMNO	Tasek Gelugor	15 December 1999	2 November 2003
Deputy Minister of Health	Dato' Seri Suleiman Mohamed MP	UMNO	Titiwangsa	15 December 1999	2 November 2003
Deputy Minister of Culture, Arts and Tourism	Dato' Fu Ah Kiow MP	MCA	Mentakab	15 December 1999	2 November 2003
Deputy Minister of Housing and Local Government	Datuk Peter Chin Fah Kui MP	SUPP	Miri	15 December 1999	2 November 2003
Deputy Minister of Housing and Local Government	Datuk M. Kayveas	PPP	Senator	29 September 2001	2 November 2003
Deputy Minister of Foreign Affairs	Datuk Leo Michael Toyad MP	PBB	Mukah	15 December 1999	2 November 2003
Deputy Minister of Human Resources	Datuk Abdul Latiff Ahmad MP	UMNO	Mersing	15 December 1999	2 November 2003
Deputy Minister of Domestic Trade and Consumerism	Dato' Subramaniam Sinniah MP	MIC	Segamat	15 December 1999	2 November 2003
Deputy Minister of Entrepreneur Development	Dato' Mohd. Khalid Mohd. Yunos MP	UMNO	Jempol	21 November 2002	2 November 2003
Deputy Minister of Rural Development	Dato' Palanivel Govindasamy MP	MIC	Hulu Selangor	15 December 1999	2 November 2003
Deputy Minister of Works	Dato' Mohamed Khaled Nordin MP	UMNO	Johor Bahru	15 December 1999	2 November 2003
Deputy Minister of Science, Technology and Environment	Dato' Zainal Dahlan MP	UMNO	Sabak Bernam	15 December 1999	2 November 2003
Deputy Minister of Energy, Water and Communications	Datuk Tan Chai Ho MP	MCA	Bandar Tun Razak	15 December 1999	2 November 2003
Deputy Minister of Primary Industries	Datuk Anifah Aman MP	UMNO	Beaufort	15 December 1999	2 November 2003
Deputy Minister of National Unity and Community Development	Datuk Tiki Lafe MP	SNAP	Mas Gading	15 December 1999	2 November 2003
Deputy Minister of Youth and Sports	Datuk Ong Tee Keat MP	MCA	Ampang Jaya	15 December 1999	2 November 2003
Deputy Minister of Information	Dato' Mohd. Khalid Mohd. Yunos MP	UMNO	Jempol	15 December 1999	21 November 2002
Deputy Minister of Information	Dato' Zainuddin Maidin	UMNO	Senator	21 November 2002	2 November 2003

== See also ==
- Members of the Dewan Rakyat, 10th Malaysian Parliament
- List of parliamentary secretaries of Malaysia#Sixth Mahathir cabinet
