= Abdullah Cabinet =

Abdullah Cabinet is the name of any of three cabinets of Malaysia:

- Cabinet Abdullah I (2003–2004)
- Cabinet Abdullah II (2004–2008)
- Cabinet Abdullah III (2008–2009)
