= First Abdullah cabinet =

- 15th Cabinet of Malaysia

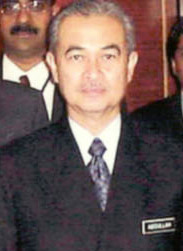

People and organisations
- Head of state: Tuanku Syed Sirajuddin
- Head of government: Abdullah Ahmad Badawi
- Deputy head of government: Najib Razak (from 2004)
- Member parties: Barisan Nasional: United Malays National Organisation; Malaysian Chinese Association; United Traditional Bumiputera Party; Malaysian Indian Congress; Malaysian People's Movement Party; Sarawak United Peoples' Party; Sarawak National Party; United Pasokmomogun Kadazandusun Murut Organisation; Liberal Democratic Party; Sabah Progressive Party; United Sabah Party; Sarawak Progressive Democratic Party; Sarawak Native People's Party
- Status in legislature: Coalition government
- Opposition parties: Pan-Malaysian Islamic Party; Democratic Action Party; People's Justice Party
- Opposition leader: Abdul Hadi Awang

History
- Outgoing election: 2004 Malaysian general election
- Legislature term: 10th Malaysian Parliament
- Predecessor: Sixth Mahathir cabinet
- Successor: Second Abdullah cabinet

Abdullah Ahmad Badawi formed the first Abdullah cabinet after being invited by Tuanku Syed Sirajuddin to form a new government, following the resignation of the previous prime minister of Malaysia, Mahathir Mohamad. Prior to the election, Mahathir led (as prime minister) the sixth Mahathir cabinet, a coalition government that consisted of members of the component parties of Barisan Nasional. It was the 15th cabinet of Malaysia formed since independence.

This is a list of the members of the first cabinet of the fifth prime minister of Malaysia, Abdullah Ahmad Badawi.

== Composition ==
=== Full members ===
The federal cabinet consisted of the following ministers:

Portfolio	Office bearer	Party	Constituency	Term start	Term end
Prime Minister	Dato' Seri Abdullah Ahmad Badawi MP	UMNO	Kepala Batas	3 November 2003	26 March 2004
Deputy Prime Minister	Dato' Sri Mohd. Najib Abdul Razak MP	UMNO	Pekan	7 January 2004	26 March 2004
Minister in the Prime Minister's Department	Dato' Seri Utama Rais Yatim MP	UMNO	Jelebu	3 November 2003	26 March 2004
Minister in the Prime Minister's Department	Dato' Seri Abdul Hamid Zainal Abidin	UMNO	Senator	3 November 2003	26 March 2004
Minister in the Prime Minister's Department	Dato' Tengku Adnan Tengku Mansor	UMNO	Senator	3 November 2003	26 March 2004
Minister in the Prime Minister's Department	Tan Sri Bernard Giluk Dompok MP	UPKO	Kinabalu	3 November 2003	26 March 2004
Minister of Finance	Dato' Seri Abdullah Ahmad Badawi MP	UMNO	Kepala Batas	3 November 2003	26 March 2004
Minister of Finance	Dato' Jamaluddin Jarjis MP	UMNO	Rompin	3 November 2003	26 March 2004
Minister of Defence	Dato' Sri Mohd. Najib Abdul Razak MP	UMNO	Pekan	3 November 2003	26 March 2004
Minister of Home Affairs	Dato' Seri Abdullah Ahmad Badawi MP	UMNO	Kepala Batas	3 November 2003	26 March 2004
Minister of International Trade and Industry	Dato' Seri Rafidah Aziz MP	UMNO	Kuala Kangsar	3 November 2003	26 March 2004
Minister of Education	Tan Sri Musa Mohamad MP	UMNO	Senator	3 November 2003	26 March 2004
Minister of Lands and Co-operatives Development	Tan Sri Datuk Kasitah Gaddam MP	UMNO	Senator	3 November 2003	26 March 2004
Minister of Transport	Dato' Sri Chan Kong Choy MP	MCA	Selayang	3 November 2003	26 March 2004
Minister of Agriculture	Dato Sri Mohd Effendi Norwawi MP	PBB	Kuala Rajang	3 November 2003	26 March 2004
Minister of Health	Dato' Chua Jui Meng MP	MCA	Bakri	3 November 2003	26 March 2004
Minister of Culture, Arts and Tourism	Dato' Paduka Abdul Kadir Sheikh Fadzir MP	UMNO	Kulim-Bandar Baharu	3 November 2003	26 March 2004
Minister of Housing and Local Government	Dato' Seri Ong Ka Ting MP	MCA	Pontian	3 November 2003	26 March 2004
Minister of Foreign Affairs	Dato' Syed Hamid Albar MP	UMNO	Kota Tinggi	3 November 2003	26 March 2004
Minister of Human Resources	Datuk Wira Fong Chan Onn MP	MCA	Selandar	3 November 2003	26 March 2004
Minister of Domestic Trade and Consumerism	Tan Sri Dato' Haji Muhyiddin Mohd. Yassin MP	UMNO	Pagoh	3 November 2003	26 March 2004
Minister of Entrepreneur Development	Dato' Seri Mohamed Nazri Abdul Aziz MP	UMNO	Chenderoh	3 November 2003	26 March 2004
Minister of Rural Development	Dato' Azmi Khalid MP	UMNO	Padang Besar	3 November 2003	26 March 2004
Minister of Works	Dato' Seri Samy Vellu MP	MIC	Sungai Siput	3 November 2003	26 March 2004
Minister of Science, Technology and Environment	Dato' Seri Law Hieng Ding MP	SUPP	Sarikei	3 November 2003	26 March 2004
Minister of Energy, Water and Communications	Datuk Amar Leo Moggie Irok MP	PBDS	Kanowit	3 November 2003	26 March 2004
Minister for Primary Industries	Dato' Seri Lim Keng Yaik MP	Gerakan	Beruas	3 November 2003	26 March 2004
Minister of National Unity and Community Development	Dato' Sri Siti Zaharah Sulaiman MP	UMNO	Paya Besar	3 November 2003	26 March 2004
Minister of Women and Family Development	Dato' Seri Shahrizat Abdul Jalil MP	UMNO	Lembah Pantai	3 November 2003	26 March 2004
Minister of Youth and Sports	Dato' Hishammuddin Hussein MP	UMNO	Tenggara	3 November 2003	26 March 2004
Minister of Information	Dato' Sri Mohd Khalil Yaakob MP	UMNO	Kuantan	3 November 2003	26 March 2004

=== Deputy ministers ===
Portfolio	Office bearer	Party	Constituency	Term start	Term end
Deputy Minister in the Prime Minister's Department	Dato' Seri Tengku Azlan Sultan Abu Bakar MP	UMNO	Jerantut	3 November 2003	26 March 2004
Deputy Minister in the Prime Minister's Department	M. Kayveas	PPP	Senator	3 November 2003	26 March 2004
Deputy Minister of Finance	Dato' Shafie Salleh MP	UMNO	Kuala Langat	3 November 2003	26 March 2004
Deputy Minister of Finance	Dato' Ng Yen Yen MP	MCA	Raub	3 November 2003	26 March 2004
Deputy Minister of Defence	Shafie Apdal MP	UMNO	Semporna	3 November 2003	26 March 2004
Deputy Minister of Home Affairs	Dato' Zainal Abidin Zin MP	UMNO	Bagan Serai	3 November 2003	26 March 2004
Deputy Minister of International Trade and Industry	Dato' Seri Kerk Choo Ting MP	Gerakan	Taiping	3 November 2003	26 March 2004
Deputy Minister of Education	Abdul Aziz Shamsuddin MP	UMNO	Senator	3 November 2003	26 March 2004
Deputy Minister of Education	Han Choon Kim MP	MCA	Seremban	3 November 2003	26 March 2004
Deputy Minister of Lands and Co-operatives Development	Tan Kee Kwong MP	Gerakan	Segambut	3 November 2003	26 March 2004
Deputy Minister of Transport	Tan Sri Dato' Seri Diraja Ramli Ngah Talib MP	UMNO	Pasir Salak	3 November 2003	26 March 2004
Deputy Minister of Transport	Douglas Uggah Embas MP	PBB	Betong	3 November 2003	26 March 2004
Deputy Minister of Agriculture	Dato' Seri Mohd Shariff Omar MP	UMNO	Tasek Gelugor	3 November 2003	26 March 2004
Deputy Minister of Health	Suleiman Mohamed MP	UMNO	Titiwangsa	3 November 2003	26 March 2004
Deputy Minister of Culture, Arts and Tourism	Fu Ah Kiow MP	MCA	Mentakab	3 November 2003	26 March 2004
Deputy Minister of Housing and Local Government	Peter Chin Fah Kui MP	SUPP	Miri	3 November 2003	26 March 2004
Deputy Minister of Foreign Affairs	Leo Michael Toyad MP	PBB	Mukah	3 November 2003	26 March 2004
Deputy Minister of Human Resources	Abdul Latiff Ahmad MP	UMNO	Mersing	3 November 2003	26 March 2004
Deputy Minister of Domestic Trade and Consumerism	Subramaniam Sinniah MP	MIC	Segamat	3 November 2003	26 March 2004
Deputy Minister of Entrepreneur Development	Mohd. Khalid Mohd. Yunos MP	UMNO	Jempol	3 November 2003	26 March 2004
Deputy Minister of Rural Development	Dato' Palanivel Govindasamy MP	MIC	Hulu Selangor	3 November 2003	26 March 2004
Deputy Minister of Works	Mohamed Khaled Nordin MP	UMNO	Johor Bahru	3 November 2003	26 March 2004
Deputy Minister of Science, Technology and Environment	Zainal Dahlan	UMNO	Sabak Bernam	3 November 2003	26 March 2004
Deputy Minister of Energy, Water and Communications	Datuk Tan Chai Ho MP	MCA	Bandar Tun Razak	3 November 2003	26 March 2004
Deputy Minister of Primary Industries	Anifah Aman MP	UMNO	Beaufort	3 November 2003	26 March 2004
Deputy Minister of National Unity and Community Development	Tiki Lafe MP	SNAP	Mas Gading	3 November 2003	26 March 2004
Deputy Minister of Youth and Sports	Ong Tee Keat MP	MCA	Ampang Jaya	3 November 2003	26 March 2004
Deputy Minister of Information	Dato' Zainuddin Maidin	UMNO	Senator	3 November 2003	26 March 2004
Deputy Minister of Information	Dato' Donald Lim Siang Chai MP	MCA	Petaling Jaya Selatan	3 November 2003	26 March 2004

== See also ==
- Members of the Dewan Rakyat, 10th Malaysian Parliament
- List of parliamentary secretaries of Malaysia § First Abdullah cabinet
