= Shabudin Yahaya =

Malaysian politician

Yang Berbahagia Datuk Shabudin Yahaya DPSM
- شهاب الدين بن يحيى

Deputy Minister in the Prime Minister's Department (Parliament and Law)
- In office 6 July 2020 – 16 August 2021
- Monarch: Abdullah
- Prime Minister: Muhyiddin Yassin
- Minister: Takiyuddin Hassan
- Preceded by: Eddin Syazlee Shith
- Succeeded by: Mas Ermieyati Samsudin
- Constituency: Tasek Gelugor

Chairman of the Amanah Ikhtiar Malaysia
- Incumbent
- Assumed office 11 September 2021
- Managing Director: Mohamed Shamir Abdul Aziz
- Preceded by: Lajim Ukin

Chairman of the FELCRA Berhad
- In office 14 May 2020 – 29 July 2020
- Minister: Abdul Latiff Ahmad
- Chief Executive Officer: Mohd Nazrul Izam Mansor
- Preceded by: Mohamad Nageeb Abdul Wahab
- Succeeded by: Yamani Hafez Musa

Secretary of the Government Backbenchers Club
- In office 14 September 2021 – 11 June 2022
- Monarch: Abdullah
- Prime Minister: Ismail Sabri Yaakob
- Chairman: Tajuddin Abdul Rahman
- Preceded by: Position established
- Succeeded by: Dominic Lau Hoe Chai

Secretary of the Perikatan Nasional Government Backbenchers Club
- In office 5 January 2021 – 16 August 2021
- Monarch: Abdullah
- Prime Minister: Muhyiddin Yassin
- Chairman: Shahidan Kassim
- Preceded by: Position established
- Succeeded by: Position abolished

Member of the Malaysian Parliament for Tasek Gelugor
- In office 5 May 2013 – 19 November 2022
- Preceded by: Nor Mohamed Yakcop (BN–UMNO)
- Succeeded by: Wan Saiful Wan Jan (PN–BERSATU)
- Majority: 3,042 (2013); 81 (2018)

Member of the Penang State Legislative Assembly for Permatang Berangan
- In office 21 March 2004 – 5 May 2013
- Preceded by: Abd Ro'ni A. Hasan (BN–UMNO)
- Succeeded by: Omar Haji Abd Hamid (BN–UMNO)
- Majority: 3,910 (2004); 1,985 (2008)

Faction represented in Dewan Rakyat
- 2013–2018: Barisan Nasional
- 2018–2019: Independent
- 2019–2020: Pakatan Harapan
- 2020: Malaysian United Indigenous Party
- 2020–2022: Perikatan Nasional

Faction represented in Penang State Legislative Assembly
- 2004–2013: Barisan Nasional

Personal details
- Born: Shabudin bin Yahaya; 12 November 1965 (age 60) Penang, Malaysia (Note: calon-p042-syabudin-ikrar-pertahan.html)
- Citizenship: Malaysian
- Party: United Malays National Organisation (UMNO) (–2018); Independent (2018–2019); Malaysian United Indigenous Party (BERSATU) (since 2019)
- Other political affiliations: Barisan Nasional (BN) (–2018, aligned:since 2020); Pakatan Harapan (PH) (2019–2020); Perikatan Nasional (PN) (since 2020)
- Occupation: Politician

Shabudin bin Yahaya (Jawi: شهاب الدين بن يحيى; born 12 November 1965) is a Malaysian politician who has served as Chairman of the Amanah Ikhtiar Malaysia (AIM) since September 2021. He served as Deputy Minister in the Prime Minister's Department in charge of Parliament and Law in the Perikatan Nasional (PN) administration under former Prime Minister Muhyiddin Yassin and former Minister Takiyuddin Hassan from July 2020 to August 2021, Secretary of the Government Backbenchers Club (BBC) from September 2021 to June 2022, Secretary of the PN Government Backbenchers Club (PNBBC) from January 2021 to collapse of the PN government in August 2021, Chairman of the FELCRA Berhad briefly from May 2020 to July 2020, Member of Parliament (MP) for Tasek Gelugor from May 2013 to November 2022 and Member of the Penang State Legislative Assembly (MLA) for Permatang Berangan from March 2004 to May 2013. He is a member of the Malaysian United Indigenous Party (BERSATU), a component party of the PN and formerly Pakatan Harapan (PH) coalitions and was a member of United Malays National Organisation (UMNO), a component party of the Barisan Nasional (BN) coalition. After the defeat of BN to PH in the 2018 general election, he resigned from UMNO in 2018 and joined BERSATU in 2019.

Shabudin is also a former Syariah Court judge. He is notable as he controversially opposed an amendment to be added in the Sexual Offences Against Children Bill 2017 and stated that the people who performed statutory rape are able to marry the victim without any punishment.

== Politics ==
=== Debate of Sexual Offences Against Children Bill 2017 ===
At about 4:10 pm Malaysia Standard Time (UTC+08:00) on 4 April 2017, Teo Nie Ching, a member of parliament for Kulai had proposed for a new amendment (15A) for the Sexual Offences Against Children Bill 2017, stating that child marriage should be banned. She stated that Malaysia had signed a United Nations resolution during October 2013. Malaysia also had signed the Convention on the Elimination of All Forms of Discrimination Against Women (CEDAW) and the 16th article of the treaty writes the freedom to choose a spouse and to enter into marriage only with free and full consent. She emphasised that Malaysian's children cannot have the capacity to have free and full consent because they still cannot smoke cigarette, drive a car and vote until they reached the age of 21.

She later cited that at 30 November 2015, the deputy of the Ministry of Women, Family and Community Development made a statement that the government does not support marriage under 18, the Prime Minister's Department expressed the serious issues of child marriage on 12 April 2016 and the Spouse of the Prime Minister of Malaysia, Rosmah Mansor stated that the Malaysian have the power to increase the minimum age of marriage from 16 to 18.

She also gave out some cases of adults marrying underage children in Malaysia and claimed that the bride divorced soon after and some of their husband is actually a rapist. The chances of them dying is five times higher than a normal adult woman and they cannot continue their studies after marrying. She stated that the other Islamic country like Algeria, Egypt and Morocco's minimum marriage age is 18 years old and asked why Malaysia cannot be the same as theirs.

=== Retirement ===
On 19 June 2022, he had announced that he will retire from politics to give way for young people.

== Election results ==
Parliament of Malaysia
Year	Constituency	Candidate	Votes	Pct	Opponent(s)	Votes	Pct	Ballots cast	Majority	Turnout
2013	P042 Tasek Gelugor	Shabudin Yahaya (UMNO)	24,393	51.53%	Abd Rahman Maidin (PAS)	21,351	45.11%	48,121	3,042	89.04%
2013	P042 Tasek Gelugor	Shabudin Yahaya (UMNO)	24,393	51.53%	Mohd Shariff Omar (IND)	1,590	3.36%	48,121	3,042	89.04%
2018	P042 Tasek Gelugor	Shabudin Yahaya (UMNO)	18,547	35.73%	Marzuki Yahya (BERSATU)	18,466	35.58%	52,890	81	86.92%
2018	P042 Tasek Gelugor	Shabudin Yahaya (UMNO)	18,547	35.73%	Rizal Hafiz Ruslan (PAS)	14,891	28.69%	52,890	81	86.92%

Penang State Legislative Assembly
Year	Constituency	Candidate	Votes	Pct.	Opponent(s)	Votes	Pct	Ballots cast	Majority	Turnout
2004	N04 Permatang Berangan	Shabudin Yahaya (UMNO)	7,791	65.68%	Abdul Rahman Salleh (PAS)	3,881	32.72%	11,862	3,910	84.43%
2008	N04 Permatang Berangan	Shabudin Yahaya (UMNO)	7,295	56.97%	Arshad Mohammad Saleh (PAS)	5,310	41.46%	12,806	1,985	84.39%

== Honours ==
- Malacca
  - Companion Class II of the Exalted Order of Malacca (DPSM) – Datuk (2013)

== See also ==
- Tasek Gelugor (federal constituency)
