= Mohd Sobri Saleh =

Malaysian politician

Yang Berhormat Tuan Mohd Sobri Saleh MLA
- محمد صبري صالح

Member of the Penang State Legislative Assembly for Permatang Berangan
- Incumbent
- Assumed office 12 August 2023
- Preceded by: Nor Hafizah Othman (BN–UMNO)
- Majority: 8,949 (2023)

Personal details
- Born: Mohd Sobri bin Saleh
- Citizenship: Malaysian
- Party: Malaysian Islamic Party (PAS)
- Other political affiliations: Perikatan Nasional (PN)
- Spouse: Salmiah Mohamed Saad
- Children: 5
- Education: UiTM Arau
- Occupation: Politician

Mohd Sobri bin Saleh is a Malaysian politician who has served as Member of the Penang State Legislative Assembly (MLA) for Permatang Berangan since August 2023. He is a member of the Malaysian Islamic Party (PAS), a component party of the Perikatan Nasional (PN) coalition.

== Education ==
Mohd Sobri has studied in SK Ara Rendang and SM Al-Irsyad. He got his Diploma in Business Administration from UiTM Arau.

== Politics ==
Mohd Sobri is the Treasurer of PAS Tasek Gelugor division and a committee member of PAS Kampong Aman branch.

== Election results ==
Penang State Legislative Assembly
Year	Constituency	Candidate	Votes	Pct	Opponent(s)	Votes	Pct	Ballots cast	Majority	Turnout
2018	N04 Permatang Berangan	Mohd Sobri Saleh (PAS)	6,224	33.42%	Nor Hafizah Othman (UMNO)	6,870	36.89%	18,622	646	88.17%
2018	N04 Permatang Berangan	Mohd Sobri Saleh (PAS)	6,224	33.42%	Mohd Shariff Omar (BERSATU)	5,021	26.96%	18,622	646	88.17%
2018	N04 Permatang Berangan	Mohd Sobri Saleh (PAS)	6,224	33.42%	Azman Shah Othman (PRM)	24	0.13%	18,622	646	88.17%
2023	N04 Permatang Berangan	Mohd Sobri Saleh (PAS)	15,950	69.50%	Nor Hafizah Othman (UMNO)	7,001	30.50%	23,107	8,949	81.02%
