= Ibrahim Saad =

Malaysian politician (1946–2024)

Yang Berbahagia Tan Sri Ibrahim Saad PSM DGPN DMPN DSAP DMSM

Deputy Minister of Transport
- In office 12 November 1996 – 14 December 1999
- Prime Minister: Mahathir Mohamad
- Minister: Ling Liong Sik
- Preceded by: Mohd Ali Rustam
- Succeeded by: Ramli Ngah Talib
- Constituency: Tasek Gelugor

Deputy Minister in the Prime Minister's Department
- In office 8 May 1995 – 12 November 1996
- Prime Minister: Mahathir Mohamad
- Constituency: Tasek Gelugor

Deputy Chief Minister of Penang
- In office 1990–1995
- Governor: Hamdan Sheikh Tahir
- Chief Minister: Koh Tsu Koon
- Constituency: Seberang Jaya

Member of the Malaysian Parliament for Tasek Gelugor
- In office 25 April 1995 – 29 November 1999
- Preceded by: Mohd Shariff Omar (BN–UMNO)
- Succeeded by: Mohd Shariff Omar (BN–UMNO)
- Majority: 12,651 (1995)

Personal details
- Born: 3 August 1946 Penang, Malayan Union (now Malaysia)
- Died: 15 November 2024 (aged 78) Damansara Specialist Hospital

Ibrahim bin Saad (3 August 1946 – 15 November 2024) was a Malaysian politician and diplomat, who also served as Chairman of the Board of Directors of National University of Malaysia. Ibrahim Saad served a single term as Tasek Gelugor MP from 1995 to 1999. He was also Deputy Chief Minister of Penang (1990-1995) and Deputy Minister in the Prime Minister's Department (May 1995 until November 1996) and Deputy Minister of Transport (November 1996 – 14 December 1999).

== Career ==
Originally a USM lecturer, Ibrahim began his career in politics as Dato' Seri Anwar Ibrahim's political secretary. It was in 1983 when Anwar was Minister of Culture, Youth and Sports.

Ibrahim Saad was Seberang Jaya Assemblyman for two terms from 1986 and was a member of Parliament for Tasek Gelugor in 1995.

He won the parliamentary seat of Tasek Gelugor, Penang in the 1995 Malaysian General Election defeating Salleh Man - PAS with a majority of 12,651 votes.

After the dismissal of Anwar Ibrahim as the Deputy Prime Minister of Malaysia, he was appointed the Umno Chief of the Permatang Pauh division. He was also the Head of the Penang State Umno Youth Movement. He was one of Anwar Ibrahim's former allies who still remained in UMNO after Anwar's sacking.

Ibrahim Saad was defeated in the 1999 Malaysian General Election by Anwar's wife, Wan Azizah Wan Ismail. Wan Azizah won 23,820 votes with a majority of 9,077 votes as Ibrahim only got 14,743 votes.

After retiring from politics, he was appointed President / Chief Executive Officer of Universiti Kuala Lumpur from 2002 to 2005 and Chairman of the British Institute of Malaysia from 2001 to 2002.

Ibrahim became the Secretary General of the Football Association of Malaysia (FAM) from 2005 to 2007 during the 42nd Annual Congress of FAM, then Vice President of the Malaysian Olympic Council (2007-2009).

He was appointed the secretary general of the Organization of Former UMNO Representatives (Pakku). This organization fought for the welfare of UMNO representatives.

On 2 June 2010, he received his letter of appointment as Ambassador to the Philippines from the Yang di-Pertuan Agong Sultan Mizan Zainal Abidin at the Istana Negara. He served as Ambassador for two years until July 2012.

== Death ==
Saad died due to respiratory complications at the Damansara Specialist Hospital, on 15 November 2024. He was 78. He was survived by his wife, Puan Sri Zainab Abdul Kadeer, and five children.

== Election results ==
Penang State Legislative Assembly
| Year | Constituency | Candidate | Votes | Pct | Opponent(s) | Votes | Pct | Ballots cast | Majority | Turnout |
|---|---|---|---|---|---|---|---|---|---|---|
| 1986 | N10 Seberang Jaya | Ibrahim Saad (UMNO) | 4,939 | 58.38% | Yeow Yu Beng (DAP) | 2,485 | 29.37% | 8,649 | 2,454 | 74.25% |
| 1986 | N10 Seberang Jaya | Ibrahim Saad (UMNO) | 4,939 | 58.38% | Koh Ah Toung (PAS) | 1,036 | 12.25% | 8,649 | 2,454 | 74.25% |
| 1990 | N10 Seberang Jaya | Ibrahim Saad (UMNO) | 8,757 | 73.05% | Yeow Yu Beng (DAP) | 3,230 | 26.95% | 12,383 | 5,527 | 78.47% |

Parliament of Malaysia
| Year | Constituency | Candidate | Votes | Pct | Opponent(s) | Votes | Pct | Ballots cast | Majority | Turnout |
|---|---|---|---|---|---|---|---|---|---|---|
| 1995 | P042 Tasek Gelugor | Ibrahim Saad (UMNO) | 20,061 | 73.03% | Mohd Salleh Man (PAS) | 7,410 | 26.97% | 28,538 | 12,651 | 77.02% |
| 1999 | P044 Permatang Pauh | Ibrahim Saad (UMNO) | 14,743 | 38.23% | Wan Azizah Wan Ismail (keADILan) | 23,820 | 61.77% | 39,210 | 9,077 | 78.94% |

== Honours ==
- Malaysia
  - Commander of the Order of Loyalty to the Crown of Malaysia (PSM) – Tan Sri (2016)
- Penang
  - Commander of the Order of the Defender of State (DGPN) – Dato' Seri (2002)
  - Companion of the Order of the Defender of State (DMPN) – Dato' (1995)
- Malacca
  - Companion Class I of the Exalted Order of Malacca (DMSM) – Datuk (1993)
- Pahang
  - Knight Companion of the Order of Sultan Ahmad Shah of Pahang (DSAP) – Dato' (1996)
