= Nor Hafizah Othman =

Malaysian politician

- نور حفيظه عثمان

Member of the Penang State Legislative Assembly for Permatang Berangan
- In office 9 May 2018 – 12 August 2023
- Preceded by: Omar Abd Hamid (BN–UMNO)
- Succeeded by: Mohd Sobri Saleh (PN–PAS)

Chief of UMNO Penang Women Wing
- Incumbent
- Assumed office 2023
- President: Ahmad Zahid Hamidi
- Chief of UMNO Women Wing: Noraini Ahmad

Personal details
- Born: Nor Hafizah binti Othman; 5 September 1976 (age 50) Pokok Tampang, Tasek Gelugor, Pulau Pinang
- Citizenship: Malaysian
- Party: UMNO
- Other political affiliations: Barisan Nasional
- Education: International Islamic University Malaysia
- Occupation: Politician
- Profession: Lawyer

Nor Hafizah binti Othman is a Malaysian politician from UMNO. She has served as the Member of the Penang State Legislative Assembly for Permatang Berangan from 2018 to 2023.

== Politics ==
Nor Hafizah was the Chief of Women Youth Wing UMNO Tasek Gelugor Division. Besides that, she has served as the Chief of UMNO Penang Women Wing since 2023.

== Election results ==
Penang State Legislative Assembly
Year	Constituency	Candidate	Votes	Pct.	Opponent(s)	Votes	Pct.	Ballots cast	Majority	Turnout
2018	N04 Permatang Berangan	Nor Hafizah Othman (UMNO)	6,870	36.89%	Mohd Sobri Saleh (PAS)	6,224	33.42%	18,622	646	88.17%
2018	N04 Permatang Berangan	Nor Hafizah Othman (UMNO)	6,870	36.89%	Mohd Shariff Omar (BERSATU)	5,021	26.96%	18,622	646	88.17%
2018	N04 Permatang Berangan	Nor Hafizah Othman (UMNO)	6,870	36.89%	Azman Shah Othman (PRM)	24	0.13%	18,622	646	88.17%
2023	N04 Permatang Berangan	Nor Hafizah Othman (UMNO)	7,001	30.50%	Mohd Sobri Saleh (PAS)	15,950	69.50%	23,107	8,949	81.02%
