= Sulaiman Bulon =

Malaysian politician (1923–1982)

Sulaiman bin Bulon (1923–1982) born in Lambor Kiri, Perak was the Member of Parliament for Malaysia in the Bagan Datoh constituency after gaining 12,225 votes against his opponent Ibrahim bin Hj Dahlan with 4,331 votes in the 1964 Malaysian general election.

== Career ==
He later also won in the 1969 Malaysian general election. He was headman in the administration of the Perak state government. Later, he contested the state assembly and became the Deputy Menteri Besar of Perak. After that he contested at the Parliament or Dewan Rakyat level and was appointed as the Deputy Minister of Agriculture.

A court case was made against him for debts related matters. At that time, the Malaysian Prime Minister Tunku Abdul Rahman insisted that ministers could not have court cases as Ministers must be free from all burdens, and if any, they should be stripped of their posts.

Berita Harian on 25 January 1971 reported that Sulaiman Bulon as the Member of Parliament for Bagan Datoh had won the UMNO party competition held at the Sungai Sumun People's Hall, Bagan Datoh. He has been the Bagan Datoh UMNO Division Chief since 1963.
