= Amanah Ikhtiar Malaysia =

- Formation: 1987

Amanah Ikhtiar Malaysia (AIM) is Malaysia's largest microcredit organization. Since its inception in 1987, it has disbursed more than RM2.3 billion in loans to 262,000 borrowers.

AIM claims to have the world's highest repayment rate, at 99.2%. The Asian Institute of Finance has produced a case study on AIM detailing its achievements since 1987 inception.
