= Second Abdullah cabinet =

- 16th Cabinet of Malaysia

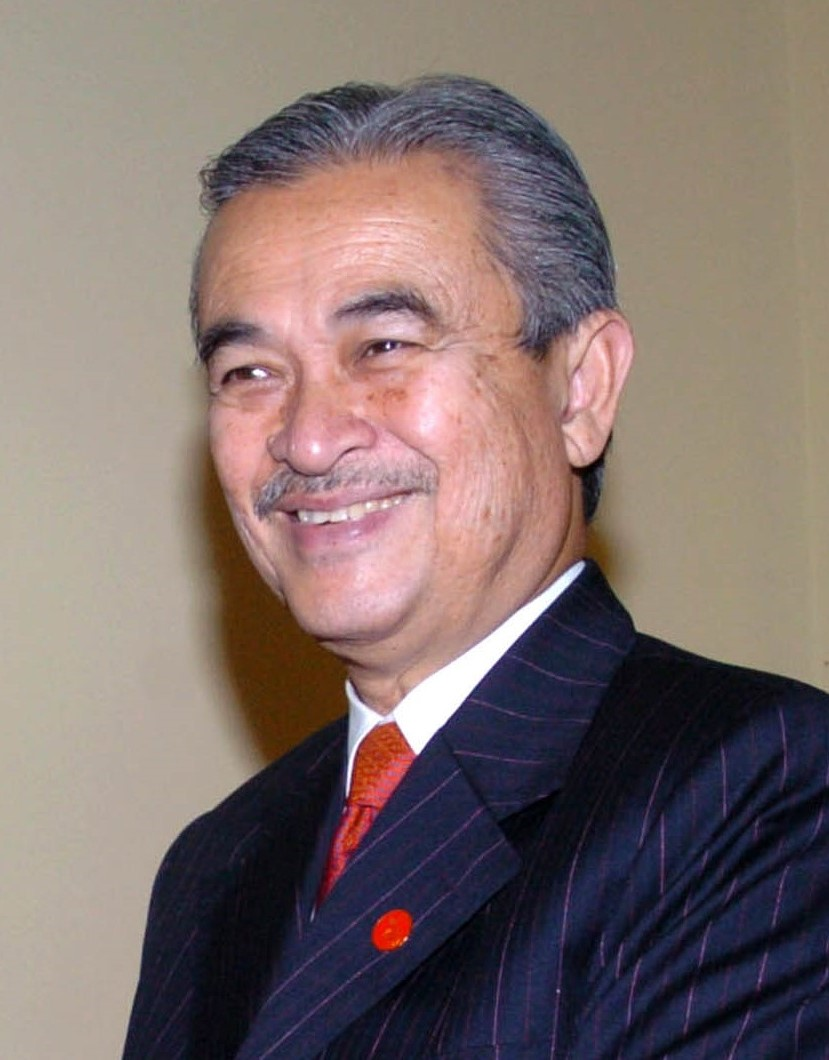
- Date established: 27 March 2004
- Date dissolved: 19 March 2008

Leadership and composition
- Head of state: Tuanku Syed Sirajuddin (2004–2006); Tuanku Mizan Zainal Abidin (2006–2008)
- Head of government: Abdullah Ahmad Badawi
- Deputy: Najib Razak
- No. of ministers: 34 ministers and 39 deputy ministers,20 Parliamentary Secretaries
- Member parties: Barisan Nasional: United Malays National Organisation; Malaysian Chinese Association; United Traditional Bumiputera Party; Malaysian Indian Congress; Malaysian People's Movement Party; United Sabah Party; Sarawak United Peoples' Party; United Pasokmomogun Kadazandusun Murut Organisation; Liberal Democratic Party; Sabah Progressive Party; Sarawak Progressive Democratic Party; Sarawak People's Party; United Sabah People's Party; People's Progressive Party
- Status in legislature: Coalition government
- Opposition parties: Democratic Action Party; Pan-Malaysian Islamic Party; People's Justice Party
- Opposition leader: Lim Kit Siang
- Budgets: 2005, 2006, 2007, 2008

Formation and history
- Election: 2004 Malaysian general election
- Outgoing election: 2008 Malaysian general election
- Legislature term: 11th Malaysian Parliament
- Predecessor: First Abdullah cabinet
- Successor: Third Abdullah cabinet

Abdullah Ahmad Badawi formed the second Abdullah cabinet after being invited by Tuanku Syed Sirajuddin to begin a new government following the 21 March 2004 general election in Malaysia. Prior to the election, Abdullah led (as Prime Minister) the first Abdullah cabinet, a coalition government that consisted of members of the component parties of Barisan Nasional. It was the 16th cabinet of Malaysia formed since independence.

This is a list of the members of the second cabinet of the fifth Prime Minister of Malaysia, Abdullah Ahmad Badawi.

== Composition ==
=== Full members ===
The federal cabinet consisted of the following ministers:

Portfolio	Office bearer	Party	Constituency	Term start	Term end
Prime Minister	Dato' Seri Abdullah Ahmad Badawi MP	UMNO	Kepala Batas	27 March 2004	18 March 2008
Deputy Prime Minister	Dato' Sri Mohd. Najib Abdul Razak MP	UMNO	Pekan	27 March 2004	18 March 2008
Minister in the Prime Minister's Department	Dato' Seri Mohamed Nazri Abdul Aziz MP	UMNO	Padang Rengas	27 March 2004	18 March 2008
Minister in the Prime Minister's Department	Dato' Abdullah Md Zin MP	UMNO	Besut	27 March 2004	18 March 2008
Minister in the Prime Minister's Department	Dato' Mustapa Mohamed MP	UMNO	Jeli	27 March 2004	14 February 2006
Minister in the Prime Minister's Department	Dato' Seri Mohd Radzi Sheikh Ahmad MP	UMNO	Kangar	27 March 2004	14 February 2006
Minister in the Prime Minister's Department	Datuk Maximus Johnity Ongkili MP	PBS	Kota Marudu	27 March 2004	18 March 2008
Minister in the Prime Minister's Department	Tan Sri Datuk Seri Panglima Bernard Giluk Dompok MP	UPKO	Ranau	27 March 2004	18 March 2008
Minister in the Prime Minister's Department	Dato' Seri Mohd Effendi Norwawi	PBB	Senator	14 February 2006	18 March 2008
Minister of Finance	Dato' Seri Abdullah Ahmad Badawi MP	UMNO	Kepala Batas	27 March 2004	18 March 2008
Minister of Finance	Tan Sri Nor Mohamed Yakcop	UMNO	Senator	27 March 2004	18 March 2008
Minister of Defence	Dato' Sri Mohd. Najib Abdul Razak MP	UMNO	Pekan	27 March 2004	18 March 2008
Minister of Internal Security	Dato' Seri Abdullah Ahmad Badawi MP	UMNO	Kepala Batas	27 March 2004	18 March 2008
Minister of Home Affairs	Dato' Seri Azmi Khalid MP	UMNO	Padang Besar	27 March 2004	14 February 2006
Minister of Home Affairs	Dato' Seri Mohd Radzi Sheikh Ahmad MP	UMNO	Kangar	14 February 2006	18 March 2008
Minister of International Trade and Industry	Dato' Seri Rafidah Aziz MP	UMNO	Kuala Kangsar	27 March 2004	18 March 2008
Minister of Education	Dato' Sri Hishammuddin Hussein MP	UMNO	Sembrong	27 March 2004	18 March 2008
Minister of Natural Resources and Environment	Dato Sri Adenan Satem MP	PBB	Batang Sadong	27 March 2004	14 February 2006
Minister of Natural Resources and Environment	Dato' Seri Azmi Khalid MP	UMNO	Padang Besar	14 February 2006	18 March 2008
Minister of Federal Territories	Dato' Seri Utama Mohd Isa Abdul Samad MP	UMNO	Jempol	27 March 2004	16 October 2005
Minister of Federal Territories	Dato' Sri Shahrizat Abdul Jalil MP (Acting Minister)	UMNO	Lembah Pantai	16 October 2005	14 February 2006
Minister of Federal Territories	Dato' Sri Zulhasnan Rafique MP	UMNO	Setiawangsa	14 February 2006	18 March 2008
Minister of Transport	Dato' Sri Chan Kong Choy MP	MCA	Selayang	27 March 2004	18 March 2008
Minister of Agriculture and Agro-based Industry	Tan Sri Dato' Haji Muhyiddin Mohd. Yassin MP	UMNO	Pagoh	27 March 2004	18 March 2008
Minister of Health	Dato' Chua Soi Lek MP	MCA	Labis	27 March 2004	2 January 2008
Minister of Health	Dato' Seri Ong Ka Ting MP (Acting Minister)	MCA	Tanjong Piai	2 January 2008	18 March 2008
Minister of Tourism	Datuk Leo Michael Toyad MP	PBB	Mukah	27 March 2004	14 February 2006
Minister of Tourism	Dato' Sri Tengku Adnan Tengku Mansor MP	UMNO	Putrajaya	14 February 2006	18 March 2008
Minister of Arts, Culture and Heritage	Dato' Seri Utama Rais Yatim MP	UMNO	Jelebu	27 March 2004	18 March 2008
Minister of Housing and Local Government	Dato' Seri Ong Ka Ting MP	MCA	Tanjong Piai	27 March 2004	18 March 2008
Minister of Foreign Affairs	Dato' Syed Hamid Albar MP	UMNO	Kota Tinggi	27 March 2004	18 March 2008
Minister of Higher Education	Dato' Sri Shafie Salleh MP	UMNO	Kuala Langat	27 March 2004	14 February 2006
Minister of Higher Education	Dato' Mustapa Mohamed MP	UMNO	Jeli	14 February 2006	18 March 2008
Minister of Human Resources	Datuk Seri Fong Chan Onn MP	MCA	Alor Gajah	27 March 2004	18 March 2008
Minister of Domestic Trade and Consumerism	Datuk Shafie Apdal MP	UMNO	Semporna	27 March 2004	18 March 2008
Minister of Entrepreneur and Co-operatives Development	Dato' Seri Mohamed Khaled Nordin MP	UMNO	Pasir Gudang	27 March 2004	18 March 2008
Minister of Rural and Regional Development	Dato' Sri Abdul Aziz Shamsuddin MP	UMNO	Shah Alam	27 March 2004	18 March 2008
Minister of Works	Dato' Seri Samy Vellu MP	MIC	Sungai Siput	27 March 2004	18 March 2008
Minister of Science, Technology and Innovation	Dato' Sri Jamaluddin Jarjis MP	UMNO	Rompin	27 March 2004	18 March 2008
Minister of Energy, Water and Communications	Dato' Seri Lim Keng Yaik MP	Gerakan	Beruas	27 March 2004	18 March 2008
Minister for Plantation Industries and Commodities	Datuk Peter Chin Fah Kui MP	SUPP	Miri	27 March 2004	18 March 2008
Minister of Women, Family and Community Development	Dato' Sri Shahrizat Abdul Jalil MP	UMNO	Lembah Pantai	27 March 2004	18 March 2008
Minister of Youth and Sports	Dato' Sri Azalina Othman Said MP	UMNO	Pengerang	27 March 2004	18 March 2008
Minister of Information	Tan Sri Abdul Kadir Sheikh Fadzir MP	UMNO	Kulim-Bandar Baharu	27 March 2004	14 February 2006
Minister of Information	Datuk Seri Zainuddin Maidin MP	UMNO	Merbok	14 February 2006	18 March 2008

=== Deputy ministers ===
Portfolio	Office bearer	Party	Constituency	Term start	Term end
Deputy Minister in the Prime Minister's Department	M. Kayveas MP	PPP	Taiping	27 March 2004	18 March 2008
Deputy Minister in the Prime Minister's Department	Joseph Entulu Belaun MP	PBDS	Selangau	27 March 2004	18 March 2008
Deputy Minister in the Prime Minister's Department	Abdul Rahman Suliman	UMNO	Senator	14 February 2006	18 March 2008
Deputy Minister of Finance	Tengku Putera Tengku Awang MP	UMNO	Hulu Terengganu	27 March 2004	14 February 2006
Deputy Minister of Finance	Dato' Ng Yen Yen MP	MCA	Raub	27 March 2004	18 March 2008
Deputy Minister of Finance	Awang Adek Hussin MP	UMNO	Bachok	14 February 2006	18 March 2008
Deputy Minister of Defence	Dato' Zainal Abidin Zin MP	UMNO	Bagan Serai	27 March 2004	18 March 2008
Deputy Minister of Internal Security	Dato' Noh Omar MP	UMNO	Tanjong Karang	27 March 2004	14 February 2006
Deputy Minister of Internal Security	Chia Kwang Chye MP	Gerakan	Bukit Bendera	27 March 2004	14 February 2006
Deputy Minister of Internal Security	Dato' Mohd. Johari Baharum MP	UMNO	Kubang Pasu	14 February 2006	18 March 2008
Deputy Minister of Internal Security	Dato' Fu Ah Kiow MP	MCA	Kuantan	14 February 2006	18 March 2008
Deputy Minister of Home Affairs	Datuk Tan Chai Ho MP	MCA	Bandar Tun Razak	27 March 2004	18 March 2008
Deputy Minister of International Trade and Industry	Ahmad Husni Hanadzlah MP	UMNO	Tambun	27 March 2004	18 March 2008
Deputy Minister of International Trade and Industry	Mah Siew Keong MP	Gerakan	Telok Intan	27 March 2004	14 February 2006
Deputy Minister of International Trade and Industry	Ng Lip Yong MP	Gerakan	Batu	14 February 2006	18 March 2008
Deputy Minister of Education	Dato' Mahadzir Mohd Khir MP	UMNO	Sungai Petani	27 March 2004	14 February 2006
Deputy Minister of Education	Han Choon Kim MP	MCA	Seremban	27 March 2004	18 March 2008
Deputy Minister of Education	Dato' Noh Omar MP	UMNO	Tanjong Karang	14 February 2006	18 March 2008
Deputy Minister of Natural Resources and Environment	S. Sothinathan	MIC	Telok Kemang	27 March 2004	18 March 2008
Deputy Minister of Federal Territories	Zulhasnan Rafique	UMNO	Setiawangsa	27 March 2004	14 February 2006
Deputy Minister of Federal Territories	Abu Seman Yusop	UMNO	Masjid Tanah	14 February 2006	18 March 2008
Deputy Minister of Transport	Tengku Azlan Sultan Abu Bakar	UMNO	Jerantut	27 March 2004	18 March 2008
Deputy Minister of Transport	Douglas Uggah Embas MP	PBB	Betong	27 March 2004	18 March 2008
Deputy Minister of Agriculture and Agro-based Industry	Mohd Shariff Omar MP	UMNO	Tasek Gelugor	27 March 2004	18 March 2008
Deputy Minister of Agriculture and Agro-based Industry	Kerk Choo Ting	Gerakan	Simpang Renggam	27 March 2004	14 February 2006
Deputy Minister of Agriculture and Agro-based Industry	Mah Siew Keong	Gerakan	Telok Intan	14 February 2006	18 March 2008
Deputy Minister of Health	Abdul Latiff Ahmad	UMNO	Mersing	27 March 2004	18 March 2008
Deputy Minister of Tourism	Ahmad Zahid Hamidi	UMNO	Bagan Datok	27 March 2004	14 February 2006
Deputy Minister of Tourism	Donald Lim Siang Chai	MCA	Petaling Jaya Selatan	14 February 2006	18 March 2008
Deputy Minister of Arts, Culture and Heritage	Wong Kam Hoong	MCA	Bayan Baru	27 March 2004	18 March 2008
Deputy Minister of Housing and Local Government	Azizah Mohd. Dun	UMNO	Beaufort	27 March 2004	18 March 2008
Deputy Minister of Housing and Local Government	Robert Lau Hoi Chew	SUPP	Sibu	27 March 2004	18 March 2008
Deputy Minister of Foreign Affairs	Joseph Salang Gandum	PBDS	Julau	27 March 2004	18 March 2008
Deputy Minister of Higher Education	Fu Ah Kiow	MCA	Kuantan	27 March 2004	14 February 2006
Deputy Minister of Higher Education	Ong Tee Keat	MCA	Pandan	14 February 2006	18 March 2008
Deputy Minister of Human Resources	Abdul Rahman Bakar	UMNO	Marang	27 March 2004	18 March 2008
Deputy Minister of Domestic Trade and Consumerism	S. Veerasingam	MIC	Tapah	27 March 2004	18 March 2008
Deputy Minister of Entrepreneur and Co-operatives Development	Khamsiyah Yeop	UMNO	Lenggong	27 March 2004	18 March 2008
Deputy Minister of Rural and Regional Development	Awang Adek Hussin	UMNO	Bachok	27 March 2004	14 February 2006
Deputy Minister of Rural and Regional Development	Tiki Lafe	SPDP	Mas Gading	27 March 2004	18 March 2008
Deputy Minister of Rural and Regional Development	Zainal Abdidin Osman	UMNO	Nibong Tebal	14 February 2006	18 March 2008
Deputy Minister of Works	Mohd Zin Mohamed	UMNO	Sepang	27 March 2004	18 March 2008
Deputy Minister of Science, Technology and Innovation	Kong Cho Ha	MCA	Lumut	27 March 2004	18 March 2008
Deputy Minister of Energy, Water and Communications	Shaziman Abu Mansor	UMNO	Tampin	27 March 2004	18 March 2008
Deputy Minister of Plantation Industries and Commodities	Anifah Aman	UMNO	Kimanis	27 March 2004	18 March 2008
Deputy Minister of Women, Family and Community Development	Palanivel Govindasamy	MIC	Hulu Selangor	27 March 2004	18 March 2008
Deputy Minister of Youth and Sports	Ong Tee Keat	MCA	Pandan	27 March 2004	14 February 2006
Deputy Minister of Youth and Sports	Liow Tiong Lai	MCA	Bentong	14 February 2006	18 March 2008
Deputy Minister of Information	Zainuddin Maidin	UMNO	Merbok	27 March 2004	14 February 2006
Deputy Minister of Information	Donald Lim Siang Chai	MCA	Petaling Jaya Selatan	27 March 2004	14 February 2006
Deputy Minister of Information	Ahmad Zahid Hamidi	UMNO	Bagan Datok	14 February 2006	18 March 2008
Deputy Minister of Information	Chia Kwang Chye	Gerakan	Bukit Bendera	14 February 2006	18 March 2008

== See also ==
- Members of the Dewan Rakyat, 11th Malaysian Parliament
- List of parliamentary secretaries of Malaysia#Second Abdullah cabinet
