= Nor Mohamed Yakcop =

Malaysian politician

Yang Berbahagia Tan Sri Nor Mohamed Yakcop PSM SJMK SPMP SSAP SSMZ SPNS DGPN DGSM PNBS DHMS DSPN JSM SMJ DJN DSM KMN
- نور محمد يعقوب

Minister in the Prime Minister's Department Economic Planning Unit
- In office 10 April 2009 – 5 May 2013
- Monarchs: Mizan Zainal Abidin; Abdul Halim
- Prime Minister: Najib Razak
- Deputy: Ahmad Maslan
- Preceded by: Amirsham Abdul Aziz
- Succeeded by: Abdul Wahid Omar

Minister of Finance II
- In office 27 March 2004 – 9 April 2009 Serving with Abdullah Ahmad Badawi (2004–2008), Najib Razak (2008–2009)
- Monarchs: Sirajuddin; Mizan Zainal Abidin
- Prime Minister: Abdullah Ahmad Badawi
- Deputy: Ng Yen Yen (2004–2008); Tengku Putera Tengku Awang (2004–2006); Awang Adek Hussin (2006–2008); Ahmad Husni Hanadzlah (2008–2009); Kong Cho Ha (2008–2009)
- Preceded by: Jamaluddin Jarjis
- Succeeded by: Ahmad Husni Hanadzlah
- Constituency: Senator; Tasek Gelugor

Member of the Malaysian Parliament for Tasek Gelugor
- In office 8 March 2008 – 5 May 2013
- Preceded by: Mohd Shariff Omar (BN–UMNO)
- Succeeded by: Shabudin Yahaya (BN–UMNO)
- Majority: 4,547 (2008)

Personal details
- Born: Nor Mohamed bin Yakcop; 24 August 1947 (age 79) Penang, Malayan Union (now Malaysia)
- Party: United Malays National Organisation (UMNO)
- Other political affiliations: Barisan Nasional (BN); Perikatan Nasional (PN); Muafakat Nasional (MN)
- Spouse: Fawziah Begum Abu Bakar
- Children: 3
- Education: University of Malaya; Catholic University of Leuven
- Occupation: Economist

Nor Mohamed bin Yakcop (Jawi: نور محمد بن يعقوب; born 24 August 1947) is a Malaysian politician who served as Minister in the Prime Minister's Department, in charge of Economic Planning Unit from 2009 to 2013. He had previously served as Minister of Finance II from 2004 to 2009. He is a member of the Executive Committee of the National Economic Advisory Council.

== Career ==
He served with Bank Negara, the Malaysian central bank from 1968 to 2000. During his time in Bank Negara he was responsible for the implementation of a number of major projects, including

- the implementation of Islamic banking in Malaysia
- the setting-up of the bilateral payments mechanism between Bank Negara Malaysia and Central Banks of South-South countries
- the setting-up of the Rating Agency Malaysia Berhad.

He was also involved in a currency speculation scandal in the early 1990s, where Bank Negara lost up to RM30 billion. No action was taken as he moved on to hold important government positions.

Yakcop was the Special Economic Adviser to former Prime Minister of Malaysia Mahathir Mohamad.

In 2002, he was appointed the director of Khazanah Nasional. He played a major role in government-linked companies (GLCs) like United Engineers Malaysia Berhad and Malaysia Airlines. The transformation of the GLCs was something he led on. Following the Asian financial crisis many of the GLCs were mired in debt and rudderless.

Yakcop restored their balance sheets using the Government's sovereign guarantee when necessary to cut down their borrowing costs. He installed new managers in the GLCs, giving them wide latitude to run the corporations honestly. To ensure that they delivered, he introduced key performance indicators and service contracts.

He was a member of the Dewan Negara, the upper house of the Parliament of Malaysia, for two terms before stepping down to run for the Tasek Gelugor parliamentary constituency in Penang in the Malaysian elections on 8 March 2008.

== Personal life ==
He was a student of St. Xavier's Institution in Penang and served as a prefect during his student days.

He is married to Puan Sri Fawziah Begum Abu Bakar, a former welfare officer. The couple have three children.

== Election results ==
Parliament of Malaysia
Year	Constituency	Candidate	Votes	Pct	Opponent(s)	Votes	Pct	Ballots cast	Majority	Turnout
2008	P042 Tasek Gelugor	Nor Mohamed Yakcop (UMNO)	20,448	56.25%	Ismail Salleh (PAS)	15,901	43.75%	37,308	4,547	83.90%

== Honours ==
=== Honours of Malaysia ===
- Malaysia
  - Commander of the Order of Loyalty to the Crown of Malaysia (PSM) – Tan Sri (2000)
  - Companion of the Order of Loyalty to the Crown of Malaysia (JSM) (1993)
  - Officer of the Order of the Defender of the Realm (KMN) (1989)
- Johor
  - Companion of the Order of the Crown of Johor (SMJ)
- Kedah
  - Knight Commander of the Order of Loyalty to Sultan Abdul Halim Mu'adzam Shah (DHMS) – Dato' Paduka (2007)
- Kelantan
  - Knight Grand Commander of the Order of the Life of the Crown of Kelantan (SJMK) – Dato' (2004)
- Malacca
  - Grand Commander of the Exalted Order of Malacca (DGSM) – Datuk Seri (2006)
  - Member of the Exalted Order of Malacca (DSM)
- Negeri Sembilan
  - Knight Grand Commander of the Order of Loyalty to Negeri Sembilan (SPNS) – Dato' Seri Utama (2007)
- Pahang
  - Knight Grand Companion of the Order of Sultan Ahmad Shah of Pahang (SSAP) – Dato' Sri (2004)
- Penang
  - Commander of the Order of the Defender of State (DGPN) – Dato' Seri (2003)
  - Officer of the Order of the Defender of the State (DSPN) – Dato' (1997)
  - Member of the Order of the Defender of the State (DJN)
- Perlis
  - Knight Grand Commander of the Order of the Crown of Perlis (SPMP) – Dato' Seri (2006)
- Sarawak
  - Knight Commander of the Most Exalted Order of the Star of Sarawak (PNBS) – Dato Sri (2008)
- Terengganu
  - Knight Grand Companion of the Order of Sultan Mizan Zainal Abidin of Terengganu (SSMZ) – Dato' Seri (2005)
