= Permatang Berangan =

State constituency in Penang, Malaysia

Permatang Berangan (N04)
Penang constituency

State constituency
- Legislature: Penang State Legislative Assembly
MLA
Mohd Sobri Saleh
PN
- Constituency created: 1995
- First contested: 1995
- Last contested: 2023

Demographics
- Electors (2023): 28,519
- Area (km²): 56

Permatang Berangan is a state constituency in Penang, Malaysia, that has been represented in the Penang State Legislative Assembly.

The state constituency was first contested in 1995 and is mandated to return a single Assemblyman to the Penang State Legislative Assembly under the first-past-the-post voting system. Since 2023, the State Assemblyman for Permatang Berangan is Mohd Sobri Saleh from Perikatan Nasional (PN).

== Definition ==
=== Polling districts ===
According to the federal gazette issued on 30 March 2018, the Permatang Berangan constituency is divided into 10 polling districts.

State constituency	Polling districts	Code	Location
Permatang Berangan (N04)	Ara Rendang	042/04/01	SK Ara Rendang
Permatang Berangan (N04)	Pokok Machang	042/04/02	SMK Pokok Sena
Permatang Berangan (N04)	Pokok Tampang	042/04/03	SK Pengkalan Jaya
Permatang Berangan (N04)	Permatang Berangan	042/04/04	SMK Bakti
Permatang Berangan (N04)	Simpang Tiga	042/04/05	SJK (T) Ldg Mayfield
Permatang Berangan (N04)	Tasek Gelugor	042/04/06	SJK (C) Lee Chee
Permatang Berangan (N04)	Jarak	042/04/07	SK Padang Menora
Permatang Berangan (N04)	Padang Chempedak	042/04/08	SR Islam Al-Rahman Padang Chempedak
Permatang Berangan (N04)	Ara Kuda	042/04/09	Dewan Petempatan Banjir Ara Kuda
Permatang Berangan (N04)	Permatang Kerai	042/04/10	Madrasah Al-Tahzib Al-Diniah Permatang Kerai Besar

== Demographics ==
Ethnic breakdown of Permatang Berangan's electorate as of 2023
1. Malay (86.7%)
2. Indian (6.63%)
3. Chinese (6.27%)
4. Other ethnicities (0.38%)

Total electors by polling district in 2016
Polling district	Electors
Ara Rendang	2,556
Pokok Machang	1,998
Pokok Tampang	2,128
Permatang Berangan	1,180
Simpang Tiga	2,472
Tasek Gelugor	2,344
Jarak	2,016
Padang Chempedak	1,786
Ara Kuda	608
Permatang Kerai	1,683
Total	18,771
Source: Malaysian Election Commission

== History ==
Penang State Legislative Assemblyman for Permatang Berangan
Assembly	No	Years	Member	Party
Constituency created from Ara Rendang and Pinang Tunggal
9th	N04	1995–1999	Mohd Shariff Omar	BN (UMNO)
10th	N04	1999–2004	Abd Ro'ni A. Hasan	BN (UMNO)
11th	N04	2004–2008	Shabudin Yahaya	BN (UMNO)
12th	N04	2008–2013	Shabudin Yahaya	BN (UMNO)
13th	N04	2013–2018	Omar Haji Abd Hamid	BN (UMNO)
14th	N04	2018–2023	Nor Hafizah Othman	BN (UMNO)
15th	N04	2023–present	Mohd Sobri Saleh	PN (PAS)

== Election results ==
Penang state election, 2023: Permatang Berangan
Party	Candidate	Votes	%	∆%
PN	Mohd Sobri Saleh	15,950	69.50	▲36.08
BN	Nor Hafizah Othman	7,001	30.50	▼6.39
Total valid votes		22,951	100.00	
Total rejected ballots		122		
Unreturned ballots		34		
Turnout		23,107	81.02	▼7.15
Registered electors		28,519		
Majority		8,949	39.00	▲35.53
PN gain from BN		Swing		?

Penang state election, 2018: Permatang Berangan
Party	Candidate	Votes	%	∆%
BN	Nor Hafizah Othman	6,870	36.89	▼17.29
PAS	Mohd Sobri Saleh	6,224	33.42	▼10.90
PKR	Mohd Shariff Omar	5,021	26.96	▲26.96
Parti Rakyat Malaysia	Azman Shah Othman	24	0.13	▲0.13
Total valid votes		18,139	97.41	
Total rejected ballots		296	1.59	
Unreturned ballots		187	1.00	
Turnout		18,622	88.17	▼1.56
Registered electors		21,120		
Majority		646	3.47	▼6.39
BN hold		Swing		
Source(s) "His Majesty's Government Gazette - Notice of Contested Election, State Legislative Assembly for the State of Penang [P.U. (B) 252/2018]" (PDF). Attorney General's Chambers of Malaysia. 3 May 2018. "Federal Government Gazette - Results of Contested Election and Statements of the Poll after the Official Addition of Votes, State Constituencies for the State of Penang [P.U. (B) 326/2018]" (PDF). Attorney General's Chambers of Malaysia. 28 May 2018. Archived from the original (PDF) on 29 August 2019.

Penang state election, 2013: Permatang Berangan
Party	Candidate	Votes	%	∆%
BN	Omar Haji Abdul Hamid	8,913	54.18	▼2.79
PAS	Arshad Mohammad Saleh	7,292	44.32	▲2.86
Total valid votes		16,205	98.50	
Total rejected ballots		247	1.50	
Unreturned ballots		30	0.18	
Turnout		16,452	89.73	▲5.34
Registered electors		18,336		
Majority		1,621	9.86	▼5.65
BN hold		Swing		
Source(s) "Federal Government Gazette - Notice of Contested Election, State Legislative Assembly for the State of Penang [P.U. (B) 189/2013]" (PDF). Attorney General's Chambers of Malaysia. 26 April 2013. "Federal Government Gazette - Results of Contested Election and Statements of the Poll after the Official Addition of Votes, State Constituencies for the State of Penang [P.U. (B) 230/2013]" (PDF). Attorney General's Chambers of Malaysia. 22 May 2013. Archived from the original (PDF) on 22 March 2019.

Penang state election, 2008: Permatang Berangan
Party	Candidate	Votes	%	∆%
BN	Shabudin Yahaya	7,295	56.97	▼8.71
PAS	Arshad Mohammad Saleh	5,310	41.46	▲8.74
Total valid votes		12,605	98.43	
Total rejected ballots		193	1.51	
Unreturned ballots		8	0.06	
Turnout		12,806	84.39	▼0.04
Registered electors		15,174		
Majority		1,985	15.51	▼17.45
BN hold		Swing		
Source(s) "KEPUTUSAN PILIHAN RAYA UMUM DEWAN UNDANGAN NEGERI PERAK BAGI TAHUN 2008".

Penang state election, 2004: Permatang Berangan
Party	Candidate	Votes	%	∆%
BN	Shabudin Yahaya	7,791	65.68	▲11.21
PAS	Abdul Rahman Salleh	3,881	32.72	▼10.81
Total valid votes		11,672	98.40	
Total rejected ballots		189	1.59	
Unreturned ballots		1	0.01	
Turnout		11,862	84.43	▲3.66
Registered electors		14,049		
Majority		3,910	32.96	▲22.02
BN hold		Swing		
Source(s) "KEPUTUSAN PILIHAN RAYA UMUM DEWAN UNDANGAN NEGERI PERAK BAGI TAHUN 2004".

Penang state election, 1999: Permatang Berangan
Party	Candidate	Votes	%	∆%
BN	Abd Ro'ni A. Hasan	5,506	54.47	▼23.52
PAS	Hassan Ahmad	4,400	43.53	▲24.31
Total valid votes		9,906	97.99	
Total rejected ballots		201	1.99	
Unreturned ballots		2	0.02	
Turnout		10,109	80.77	▲1.67
Registered electors		12,516		
Majority		1,106	10.94	▼47.83
BN hold		Swing		
Source(s) "KEPUTUSAN PILIHAN RAYA UMUM DEWAN UNDANGAN NEGERI PERAK BAGI TAHUN 1999".

Penang state election, 1995: Permatang Berangan
Party	Candidate	Votes	%
BN	Mohd Shariff Omar	7,526	77.99
PAS	Mohd Salleh Man	1,855	19.22
Total valid votes		9,381	97.21
Total rejected ballots		259	2.68
Unreturned ballots		10	0.10
Turnout		9,650	79.10
Registered electors		12,200	
Majority		5,671	58.77
This was a new constituency created.
Source(s) "KEPUTUSAN PILIHAN RAYA UMUM DEWAN UNDANGAN NEGERI PERAK BAGI TAHUN 1995".

== See also ==
- Constituencies of Penang
