= Suleiman Mohamed =

Malaysian politician

Yang Berbahagia Tan Sri Dato' Seri Dr. Suleiman Mohamed PSM SSSA SMW DPMS

Deputy Minister of Health
- In office 15 December 1999 – 26 March 2004
- Prime Minister: Mahathir Mohamad (1999–2003); Abdullah Ahmad Badawi (2003–2004)
- Minister: Chua Jui Meng
- Preceded by: Mohd Ali Rustam
- Succeeded by: Abdul Latiff Ahmad
- Constituency: Titiwangsa

Deputy Minister of Information
- In office 8 May 1995 – 14 December 1999
- Prime Minister: Mahathir Mohamad
- Minister: Mohamed Rahmat
- Preceded by: Railey Jeffrey
- Succeeded by: Mohd Khalid Mohd Yunus
- Constituency: Titiwangsa

Deputy Minister in the Prime Minister's Department
- In office 20 May 1987 – 3 May 1995
- Prime Minister: Mahathir Mohamad
- Minister: Sulaiman Daud; Abang Abu Bakar Abang Mustapha
- Constituency: Titiwangsa

Member of the Malaysian Parliament for Titiwangsa
- In office 3 August 1986 – 21 March 2004
- Preceded by: new constituency
- Succeeded by: Astaman Abdul Aziz (BN–UMNO)
- Majority: 11,777 (1986); 12,071 (1990); 18,966 (1995); 1,513 (1999)

Personal details
- Born: Suleiman bin Mohamed
- Party: United Malays National Organisation (UMNO)
- Other political affiliations: Barisan Nasional (BN)
- Occupation: Politician

Suleiman bin Mohamed is a Malaysian politician who served as Deputy Minister of Health in the Barisan Nasional (BN) administration under former Prime Minister Mahathir Mohamad and Abdullah Ahmad Badawi and Minister of Health Chua Jui Meng from December 1999 to March 2004, Deputy Minister of Information under former Prime Minister Mahathir Mohamad and former minister Mohamed Rahmat from May 1995 to December 1999, Deputy Minister in the Prime Minister's Department from May 1987 to May 1995 as well as Member of Parliament (MP) for Titiwangsa from August 1986 to March 2004. He is a member of United Malays National Organisation (UMNO), a component party of Barisan Nasional (BN) coalitions.

== Political career ==
Suleiman Mohamed first elected as MP for Titiwangsa in 1986 general election. He reelected as MP for Titiwangsa in 1990, 1995 and 1999 general election.

In 1987 to 1995, he was appointed as Deputy Minister in the Prime Minister's Department under minister Sulaiman Daud and Abang Abu Bakar Abang Mustapha. In 1995 to 1999, he was appointed as Deputy Minister of Information under minister Mohamed Rahmat. In 1999 to 2004, he was appointed as Deputy Minister of Health under minister Chua Jui Meng.

== Post career ==
Suleiman Mohamed served as Chairman of the Wecare Holdings & Healthcare Berhad. He also had served as Chiarman of the UBB Amanah Berhad. On 1 June 2023, Suleiman Mohamed has been made the Independent, non-executive chairman of Yoong Onn Corp Bhd.

== Election results ==
Parliament of Malaysia
Year	Constituency	Candidate	Votes	Pct	Opponent(s)	Votes	Pct	Ballots cast	Majority	Turnout
1986	P098 Titiwangsa	Suleiman Mohamed (UMNO)	20,976	60.99%	Yee Kai Wah (DAP)	9,199	26.75%	34,657	11,777	55.44%
1986	P098 Titiwangsa	Suleiman Mohamed (UMNO)	20,976	60.99%	Abbas Alias (PAS)	4,215	12.26%	34,657	11,777	55.44%
1990	P098 Titiwangsa	Suleiman Mohamed (UMNO)	27,179	64.27%	Harun Idris (S46)	15,108	35.73%	43,829	12,071	67.45%
1995	P107 Titiwangsa	Suleiman Mohamed (UMNO)	25,545	79.52%	Othman Ngah (PAS)	6,579	20.48%	32,811	18,966	60.56%
1999	P107 Titiwangsa	Suleiman Mohamed (UMNO)	18,624	52.12%	Mohamad Noor Mohamad (PAS)	17,111	47.88%	36,245	1,513	67.50%

== Honours ==
- Malaysia
  - Commander of the Order of Loyalty to the Crown of Malaysia (PSM) – Tan Sri (2017)
- Federal Territory (Malaysia)
  - Grand Commander of the Order of the Territorial Crown (SMW) – Datuk Seri (2008)
- Selangor
  - Knight Grand Companion of the Order of Sultan Salahuddin Abdul Aziz Shah (SSSA) – Dato' Seri (2000)
  - Knight Commander of the Order of the Crown of Selangor (DPMS) – Dato' (1990)
