= Musa Mohamad =

Malaysian politician (1943–2024)

Yang Berbahagia Tan Sri Musa Mohamad PSM SPMP DPCM DMPN JSM
- موسى محمد

Minister of Education
- In office 15 December 1999 – 26 March 2004
- Monarchs: Salahuddin; Sirajuddin
- Prime Minister: Mahathir Mohamad (1999–2003); Abdullah Ahmad Badawi (2003–2004)
- Deputy: Abdul Aziz Shamsuddin (Deputy Minister of Education I); Han Choon Kim (Deputy Minister of Education II)
- Preceded by: Najib Razak
- Succeeded by: Hishammuddin Hussein
- Constituency: Senator

Personal details
- Born: Musa bin Mohamad; 29 November 1943 Bagan Datuk, Perak, Japanese-occupied Malaya
- Died: 8 June 2024 (aged 80) Petaling Jaya, Selangor, Malaysia
- Resting place: Section 9 Muslim Cemetery, Kota Damansara, Petaling Jaya, Selangor
- Party: United Malays National Organisation (UMNO)
- Other political affiliations: Barisan Nasional (BN)
- Spouse: Fauziah Shahrom

Musa bin Mohamad (Jawi: موسى بن محمد) (29 November 1943 – 8 June 2024) was a Malaysian politician who was one of the members of the UMNO Supreme Council between 2000 and 2003. He was also the Minister of Education and Vice-Chancellor, Universiti Sains Malaysia.

== Education ==
Mohamad received Bachelor of Pharmacy at the University of Singapore in 1962 and Master of Science Degree in Pharmaceutical Technology from the University of London in 1972.

== Career ==
Mohamad had more than 20 years' experience in teaching and academic administration at Universiti Sains Malaysia. He was then the Foundation Dean for Pharmacy of Universiti Sains Malaysia (USM) from 1975 to 1979. He was also the Deputy Vice Chancellor (Academic) before being made Vice Chancellor from 1982 to 1998.

== Politics ==
Mohamad was appointed a Senator in 1999 by Prime Minister of Malaysia, Tun Dr. Mahathir Mohamad. He then, was appointed Minister of Education from 1999 to 2003. Tun Abdullah Ahmad Badawi extended his ministerial position until 2004.

== Retirement and death ==
After retirement from the government, he was appointed Chairman for several corporations such as Polyglass, Universiti Telekom Sdn Bhd (also as the director). He was also the Independent & Non-Executive Chairman of Pelikan International Corporation Berhad from 2005 to 2012.

Mohamad died on 8 June 2024, at the age of 80 from Multiple Myeloma.

== Awards ==
Mohamad was awarded seven honorary doctorates in science by the University College of Science and Technology (KUSTEM), University Malaysia Sabah (UMS), North Malaysia Engineering University College (KUKUM), Science University of Malaysia (USM); in knowledge science by Multimedia University (MMU); in philosophy by University College Tun Hussein Onn (KUITTHO); and education by UCSI University. Tan Sri Musa was also a fellow of the Malaysian Pharmaceutical Society and the Academy of Sciences.

=== Honours of Malaysia ===
- Malaysia
  - Companion of the Order of Loyalty to the Crown of Malaysia (JSM) (1981)
  - Commander of the Order of Loyalty to the Crown of Malaysia (PSM) – Tan Sri (1994)
- Penang
  - Companion of the Order of the Defender of State – Dato' (DMPN)
- Perak
  - Knight Grand Commander of the Order of the Perak State Crown (SPMP) – Dato' Seri (2000)
  - Knight Commander of the Order of Cura Si Manja Kini (DPCM) – Dato' (1985)
