= Mohd Shariff Omar =

Malaysian politician

Yang Berbahagia Tan Sri Dato' Sri Mohd Shariff Omar PSM SPSK SSAP DGPN DPMK DMPN PPN

Permanent Chairman of the Malaysian United Indigenous Party
- In office 30 December 2017 – 23 August 2020
- Deputy: Azimi Daim
- Succeeded by: Mohd Suhaimi Abdullah

Deputy Minister of Agriculture and Agro-based Industry I
- In office 27 March 2004 – 18 March 2008 Serving with Kerk Choo Ting (2004–2006); Mah Siew Keong (2006–2008) (Deputy Minister of Agriculture and Agro-based Industry II)
- Prime Minister: Abdullah Ahmad Badawi
- Minister: Muhyiddin Yassin
- Preceded by: Himself
- Succeeded by: Rohani Abdul Karim

Deputy Minister of Agriculture
- In office 15 December 1999 – 27 March 2004
- Prime Minister: Mahathir Mohamad; Abdullah Ahmad Badawi
- Minister: Mohd Effendi Norwawi
- Preceded by: Tengku Mahmud Tengku Mansor
- Succeeded by: Himself

Member of the Malaysian Parliament for Tasek Gelugor
- In office 1999–2008
- Preceded by: Ibrahim Saad
- Succeeded by: Nor Mohamed Yakcop
- In office 1990–1995
- Preceded by: Mohammed Yusoff Abdul Latib
- Succeeded by: Ibrahim Saad

Personal details
- Party: United Malays National Organisation (UMNO) (until 2008); People's Justice Party (PKR) (2014–2016); Malaysian United Indigenous Party (BERSATU) (since 2016)
- Other political affiliations: Barisan Nasional (until 2008); Pakatan Harapan (PH) (2014–2020); Perikatan Nasional (PN) (since 2020)
- Relations: Mohsein Md Shariff (Son)

Mohd Shariff bin Omar is a Malaysian politician. He had served Member of Parliament of Tasek Gelugor from 1990 to 1995 and 1999 to 2004. He was a member of UMNO, a component party of Barisan Nasional (BN). He currently is a member of BERSATU, a component party of Perikatan Nasional (PN).

== Political career ==
Mohd Shariff Omar political career started when he won the State Seat of Sungai Dua of Penang in the 1982 General Election. Prior to this, he had served as Assistant District Officer of Pekan, Pahang in 1972 and continued to serve the State of Perak and Penang until 1982. He then served as a member of the Penang State Legislative EXCO from 1982 until 1990. He was subsequently won the Parliamentary seat of Tasek Gelugor, Penang and appointed as the Parliamentary Secretary of Agriculture in 1990 until 1995. In 1995, he was appointed as Deputy Chief Minister of Penang following won the newly created state seat of Permatang Berangan. He returned as a Member of Parliament for another 2 terms from 1999 until 2008 and during that period, he was appointed as Deputy Minister of Agriculture and Agro-Based Industry I. Mohd Shariff was dismissed from UMNO after submitting nomination forms in the 2013 Malaysian general election as an independent candidate for running Parliamentary seat of Tasek Gelugor. Then, he joined the People's Justice Party in 2014. During the establishment of BERSATU in 2016, he was the party's coordinator in Penang. In 2017, he was elected as the permanent chairman of the Bersatu General Assembly until 2020.

== Post career ==
Mohd Shariff Omar currently served as Independent Non-Executive Director of Serba Dinamik Holding Berhads appointed on 9 June 2022.

== Election results ==
Penang State Legislative Assembly
Year	Constituency	Candidate	Votes	Pct	Opponent(s)	Votes	Pct	Ballots cast	Majority	Turnout
1982	N07 Sungai Dua	Mohd Shariff Omar (UMNO)	5,379	70.62%	Zabidi Ali (PAS)	2,238	29.38%	7,764	3,599	75.27%
1986	N05 Sungai Dua	Mohd Shariff Omar (UMNO)	5,922	71.83%	Mohd Salleh (PAS)	2,323	28.17%	8,494	3,599	76.45%
1995	N04 Permatang Berangan	Mohd Shariff Omar (UMNO)	7,526	77.99%	Mohd Salleh Man (PAS)	1,855	19.22%	9,650	5,671	79.10%
2013	N05 Sungai Dua	Mohd Shariff Omar (IND)	344	2.20%	Muhamad Yusoff Mohd Noor (UMNO)	7,951	50.00%	16,089	357	90.00%
2013	N05 Sungai Dua	Mohd Shariff Omar (IND)	344	2.20%	Zahadi Mohd (PAS)	7,594	47.80%	16,089	357	90.00%
2018	N04 Permatang Berangan	Mohd Shariff Omar (BERSATU)	5,021	26.96%	Nor Hafizah Othman (UMNO)	6,870	36.89%	18,622	646	88.17%
2018	N04 Permatang Berangan	Mohd Shariff Omar (BERSATU)	5,021	26.96%	Mohd Sobri Saleh (PAS)	6,224	33.42%	18,622	646	88.17%
2018	N04 Permatang Berangan	Mohd Shariff Omar (BERSATU)	5,021	26.96%	Azman Shah Othman (PRM)	24	0.13%	18,622	646	88.17%

Parliament of Malaysia
Year	Constituency	Candidate	Votes	Pct	Opponent(s)	Votes	Pct	Ballots cast	Majority	Turnout
1990	P039 Tasek Gelugor	Mohd Shariff Omar (UMNO)	20,379	75.32%	Shuaib Jaafar (PAS)	6,679	24.68%	27,881	13,700	79.15%
1999	P042 Tasek Gelugor	Mohd Shariff Omar (UMNO)	16,936	57.15%	Ahmad Rosli Ayob (keADILan)	12,700	42.85%	30,968	4,236	80.02%
2004	P042 Tasek Gelugor	Mohd Shariff Omar (UMNO)	22,011	65.05%	Mujahid Yusof Rawa (PAS)	11,828	34.95%	34,551	10,183	83.03%
2013	P042 Tasek Gelugor	Mohd Shariff Omar (IND)	1,590	3.36%	Shabudin Yahaya (UMNO)	24,393	51.53%	48,121	3,042	89.04%
2013	P042 Tasek Gelugor	Mohd Shariff Omar (IND)	1,590	3.36%	Abdul Rahman Maidin (PAS)	21,351	45.11%	48,121	3,042	89.04%

== Honours ==
- Malaysia
  - Commander of the Order of Loyalty to the Crown of Malaysia (PSM) – Tan Sri (2021)
  - Medal of the Order of the Defender of the Realm (PPN) (1982)
- Kelantan
  - Knight Commander of the Order of the Crown of Kelantan (DPMK) – Dato' (2002)
  - Knight Grand Commander of the Order of Loyalty to the Crown of Kelantan (SPSK) – Dato' (2009)
- Pahang
  - Knight Grand Companion of the Order of Sultan Ahmad Shah of Pahang (SSAP) – Dato' Sri (2006)
- Penang
  - Commander of the Order of the Defender of State (DGPN) – Dato' Seri (1999)
  - Companion of the Order of the Defender of State (DMPN) – Dato' (1994)
