= Mentekab (federal constituency) =

Federal constituency in Pahang, Malaysia

Pahang constituency

Defunct federal constituency
- Legislature: Dewan Rakyat
- Constituency created: 1984
- Constituency abolished: 2004
- First contested: 1986
- Last contested: 1999

Mentekab was a federal constituency in Pahang, Malaysia, that was represented in the Dewan Rakyat from 1986 to 2004.

The federal constituency was created in the 1984 redistribution and was mandated to return a single member to the Dewan Rakyat under the first past the post voting system.

== History ==
It was abolished in 2004 when it was redistributed.

=== Representation history ===
Members of Parliament for Mentekab
Parliament	No	Years	Member	Party	Vote Share
Constituency created from Temerloh, Bentong and Jerantut
7th	P078	1986-1990	Siti Zaharah Sulaiman (سيتي زهرة سليمان)	BN (UMNO)	15,271; 68.63%
8th	P078	1990-1995	Siti Zaharah Sulaiman (سيتي زهرة سليمان)	BN (UMNO)	17,147; 63.44%
9th	P082	1995-1999	Fu Ah Kiow (胡亚桥)	BN (MCA)	19,906; 69.05%
10th	P082	1999-2004	Fu Ah Kiow (胡亚桥)	BN (MCA)	18,499; 60.70%
Constituency abolished, split into Kuala Krau and Temerloh

=== State constituency ===
Parliamentary constituency	State constituency						
Parliamentary constituency	1955–59*	1959–1974	1974–1986	1986–1995	1995–2004	2004–2018	2018–present
Mentakab				Jenderak			
Mentakab				Lancang			
Mentakab				Sanggang			

=== Historical boundaries ===
State Constituency	Area	
State Constituency	1984	1994
Jenderak	FELDA Jengka 23; Jenderak; Kampung Batu Lada; Kampung Kuala Mai; Kuala Krau	
Lancang	FELDA Bukit Damar; FELDA Lakum; Kampung Lengkong; Kampung Paya Laman; Mempateh	FELDA Bukit Damar; FELDA Lakum; Kampung Lengkong; Kampung Paya Laman; Mentakab
Sanggang	Kampung China; Kerdau; Kuala Krau; Mentakab; Sanggang	Kampung Batu Tingkat; Kampung China; Kampung Melayu; Kerdau; Sanggang

== Election results ==
Malaysian general election, 1999
Party	Candidate	Votes	%	∆%
BN	Fu Ah Kiow @ Oh (Fu) Soon Guan	18,499	60.70	▼8.35
DAP	Leong Mee Meng	11,975	39.30	▲39.30
Total valid votes		30,474	100.00	
Total rejected ballots		1,504		
Unreturned ballots		166		
Turnout		32,144	73.44	▲1.31
Registered electors		43,766		
Majority		6,524	21.40	▼18.54
BN hold		Swing		

Malaysian general election, 1995
Party	Candidate	Votes	%	∆%
BN	Fu Ah Kiow @ Oh (Fu) Soon Guan	19,906	69.05	▲5.61
S46	Mohamed Harun	8,393	29.11	▼7.45
Independent	Soleh Mohamad	530	1.84	▼1.84
Total valid votes		28,829	100.00	
Total rejected ballots		1,346		
Unreturned ballots		1		
Turnout		30,176	72.13	▼1.66
Registered electors		41,837		
Majority		11,513	39.94	▲13.06
BN hold		Swing		

Malaysian general election, 1990
Party	Candidate	Votes	%	∆%
BN	Siti Zaharah Sulaiman	17,147	63.44	▼5.19
S46	Johari Ismail	9,883	36.56	▲36.56
Total valid votes		27,030	100.00	
Total rejected ballots		1,212		
Unreturned ballots		0		
Turnout		28,242	73.79	
Registered electors		38,271		
Majority		7,264	26.88	▼10.38
BN hold		Swing		

Malaysian general election, 1986
Party	Candidate	Votes	%
BN	Siti Zaharah Sulaiman	15,271	68.63
PAS	Mohamed Rusdi Arif	6,980	31.37
Total valid votes		22,251	100.00
Total rejected ballots		945	
Unreturned ballots		0	
Turnout		23,196	71.59
Registered electors		32,402	
Majority		8,291	37.26
This was a new constituency created.
