= Tengku Azlan =

Malaysian royalty and politician

Yang Amat Mulia Tengku Panglima Besar Tan Sri Dato' Seri Tengku Azlan PSM SPTJ SIMP
- تڠكو أزلان

Deputy Minister of Transport (Malaysia) I
- In office 27 March 2004 – 18 March 2008 Serving with Douglas Uggah Embas (Deputy Minister of Transport II)
- Monarchs: Syed Sirajuddin (2004–2006); Mizan Zainal Abidin (2006–2008)
- Prime Minister: Abdullah Ahmad Badawi
- Minister: Chan Kong Choy
- Preceded by: Ramli Ngah Talib
- Succeeded by: Lajim Ukin

Member of the Malaysian Parliament for Jerantut
- In office 29 November 1999 – 5 May 2013
- Preceded by: Ahmad Kamaruzaman Mohamed Baria (BN–UMNO)
- Succeeded by: Ahmad Nazlan Idris (BN–UMNO)
- Majority: 1,463 (1999); 8,457 (2004); 1,946 (2008)

Personal details
- Born: Tengku Azlan ibni Tengku Abu Bakar; 21 July 1949 (age 76) Istana Permai, Pekan, Pahang, Federation of Malaya (now Malaysia)
- Party: United Malays National Organisation (UMNO) (until 1988; 1996–2018; since 2021); Parti Melayu Semangat 46 (S46) (1989–1996); Malaysian United Indigenous Party (BERSATU) (2018–2021)
- Other political affiliations: Barisan Nasional (BN) (until 1989; 1996–2018; since 2021); Angkatan Perpaduan Ummah (APU)/Gagasan Rakyat (GR) (1989–1996); Pakatan Harapan (PH) (2018–2020); Perikatan Nasional (PN) (2020–2021)
- Spouse: Tunku Jawahir binti Tuanku Ja'afar (m. 1974)
- Relations: Tuanku Ja'afar (Father-in-law; deceased); Sultan Ahmad Shah (Elder half-brother; deceased); Tunku Naquiyuddin (Brother-in-law); Al-Sultan Abdullah (Nephew); Tengku Hassanal Ibrahim Alam Shah (Grandnephew)
- Children: Tengku Asra Jehan Juzailah; Tengku Aslahuddin Ja'afar; Tengku A'zran Abdul Jawaad
- Parent(s): Sultan Abu Bakar (Father; deceased); Tengku Hajjah Azam Tengku Omar (Mother; deceased)
- Occupation: Retired Politician

Tengku Azlan
- Tengku Panglima Besar

Tengku Panglima Besar
- Tenure: 30 July 2021 - present
- Predecessor: Tengku Hassanal Ibrahim Alam Shah

Tengku Azlan ibni Sultan Abu Bakar Ri’ayatuddin Al-Mu’azzam Shah (born 21 July 1949) is a retired Malaysian politician who served as the Member of Parliament of Malaysia (MP) for Jerantut (federal constituency), Pahang from 1999 to 2013.

Starting from 9 August 2021, he is a member of the United Malays National Organisation (UMNO) of Barisan Nasional (BN), after his resignation as Temerloh Divisional Chief of the Malaysian United Indigenous Party (BERSATU), a component of Pakatan Harapan (PH) and later Perikatan Nasional (PN) coalition, which he rejoined for the second time since he quit UMNO in 2018.

In 1999, Tengku Azlan was appointed as the Deputy Minister in the Prime Minister's Department by Prime Minister of Malaysia Prime Minister Mahathir Mohamad.

Tengku Azlan declined a Deputy Minister post after the 2008 Malaysian general election, having previously served as a Deputy Minister for Transport. He was replaced by Ahmad Nazlan Idris as the Barisan Nasional candidate for Jerantut in the 2013 Malaysian general election. He was a member of the opposition Semangat 46 party early in his political career, running for Parliament unsuccessfully in the 1995 Malaysian general election.

Tengku Azlan is the brother of the late Sultan Ahmad Shah of Pahang and is the paternal uncle to the current Sultan of Pahang, Al-Sultan Abdullah. He is married to Tunku Puteri Negeri Sembilan, Tunku Puan Sri Dato' Seri Jawahir Binti Tuanku Ja’afar and they have two sons and a daughter.

Tengku Azlan was conferred the title Tengku Panglima Besar by his nephew, Al-Sultan Abdullah on 30 July 2020, succeeding his grandnephew, Tengku Hassanal Ibrahim Alam Shah (Al-Sultan Abdullah's son) after the later acceded to become the Tengku Mahkota (Crown Prince) of Pahang.

== Election results ==
Parliament of Malaysia
Year	Constituency	Candidate	Votes	Pct	Opponent(s)	Votes	Pct	Ballot casts	Majority	Turnout
1995	P084 Temerloh	Tengku Azlan Sultan Abu Bakar (S46)	14,012	38.83%	Sabbaruddin Chik (UMNO)	22,078	61.17%	39,434	8,066	76.70%
1999	P077 Jerantut	Tengku Azlan Sultan Abu Bakar (UMNO)	16,424	52.33%	Syed Ibrahim Syed Ab Rahman (PAS)	14,961	47.67%	32,176	1,463	75.49%
2004	P081 Jerantut	Tengku Azlan Sultan Abu Bakar (UMNO)	21,349	62.35%	Hamzah Jaaffar (PAS)	12,892	37.65%	36,444	8,457	79.12%
2008	P081 Jerantut	Tengku Azlan Sultan Abu Bakar (UMNO)	19,543	52.62%	Hamzah Jaaffar (PAS)	17,597	47.38%	38,078	1,946	78.01%

== Honours ==
=== Honours of Malaysia ===
- Malaysia
  - Commander of the Order of Loyalty to the Crown of Malaysia (PSM) – Tan Sri (2012)
- Pahang
  - Tengku Panglima Besar (2020)
  - Knight Grand Companion of the Order of Sultan Ahmad Shah of Pahang (SSAP) – Dato' Sri (2007)
  - Knight Grand Companion of the Order of the Crown of Pahang (SIMP) – formerly Dato', now Dato' Indera (2002)
  - Knight Companion of the Order of Sultan Ahmad Shah of Pahang (DSAP) – Dato' (1979)
- Negeri Sembilan
  - Knight Grand Commander of the Grand Order of Tuanku Ja'afar (SPTJ) – Dato' Seri (1985)
