= Tasek Gelugor (federal constituency) =

Federal constituency of Penang, Malaysia

Tasek Gelugor (P042)
Penang constituency

Federal constituency
- Legislature: Dewan Rakyat
- MP: Wan Saiful Wan Jan; PN
- Constituency created: 1984
- First contested: 1986
- Last contested: 2022

Demographics
- Population (2020): 106,899
- Electors (2023): 81,463
- Area (km²): 109
- Pop. density (per km²): 980.7

Tasek Gelugor is a federal constituency in North Seberang Perai District, Penang, Malaysia, that has been represented in the Dewan Rakyat since 1986.

The federal constituency was created in the 1984 redistribution and is mandated to return a single member to the Dewan Rakyat under the first past the post voting system.

== Demographics ==
Ethnic breakdown of Tasek Gelugor's electorate as of 2018
1. Malay (78.6%)
2. Chinese (15.1%)
3. Indian (6.10%)
4. Other ethnicities (0.30%)
Age breakdown of Tasek Gelugor's electorate as of 2022
1. 18-20 (6.54%)
2. 21-29 (22.3%)
3. 30-39 (22.6%)
4. 40-49 (17.6%)
5. 50-59 (14.3%)
6. 60-69 (9.90%)
7. 70-79 (5.07%)
8. 80-89 (1.48%)
9. above 90 (0.21%)

As of 2020, Tasek Gelugor has a population of 106,899 people.

Gender breakdown of Tasek Gelugor's electorate as of 2022
1. Male (49.4%)
2. Female (50.6%)

== History ==
=== Polling districts ===
According to the federal gazette issued on 18 July 2023, the Tasek Gelugor constituency is divided into 27 polling districts.

State constituency	Polling districts	Code	Location
Permatang Berangan (N04)	Ara Rendang	042/04/01	SK Ara Rendang
Permatang Berangan (N04)	Pokok Machang	042/04/02	SMK Pokok Sena
Permatang Berangan (N04)	Pokok Tampang	042/04/03	SK Pengkalan Jaya
Permatang Berangan (N04)	Permatang Berangan	042/04/04	SMK Bakti
Permatang Berangan (N04)	Simpang Tiga	042/04/05	SJK (T) Ldg Mayfield
Permatang Berangan (N04)	Tasek Gelugor	042/04/06	SJK (C) Lee Chee
Permatang Berangan (N04)	Jarak	042/04/07	SK Padang Menora
Permatang Berangan (N04)	Padang Chempedak	042/04/08	SR Islam Al-Rahman Padang Chempedak
Permatang Berangan (N04)	Ara Kuda	042/04/09	Dewan Orang Ramai Taman Desa Ara Permai
Permatang Berangan (N04)	Permatang Kerai	042/04/10	Madrasah Al-Tahzib Al-Diniah Permatang Kerai Besar
Sungai Dua (N05)	Pajak Song	042/05/01	SA Rakyat Pajak Song
Sungai Dua (N05)	Simpang Ampat	042/05/02	Dewan JKK Simpang Empat Permatang Buluh
Sungai Dua (N05)	Permatang To'Jaya	042/05/03	SMK Permatang Tok Jaya
Sungai Dua (N05)	Alor Merah	042/05/04	Al-Irsyad Nurul Hidayah SA Rakyat Sungai Lokan
Sungai Dua (N05)	Kampong Telok	042/05/05	SK Desa Murni
Sungai Dua (N05)	Taman Desa Murni	042/05/06	SJK (C) Kai Chee
Sungai Dua (N05)	Sungai Dua	042/05/07	SK Sungai Dua
Sungai Dua (N05)	Kampong Setol	042/05/08	SK Permatang Buloh
Sungai Dua (N05)	Lahar Yooi	042/05/09	SK Lahar Yooi
Telok Ayer Tawar (N06)	Telok Ayer Tawar	042/06/01	SK Telok Ayer Tawar
Telok Ayer Tawar (N06)	Permatang Binjai	042/06/02	SK Permatang Binjai
Telok Ayer Tawar (N06)	Pekan Darat	042/06/03	SK Permatang To'Jaya
Telok Ayer Tawar (N06)	Taman Senangan	042/06/04	SK Taman Senangan
Telok Ayer Tawar (N06)	Mata Kuching	042/06/05	SMK Datuk Onn
Telok Ayer Tawar (N06)	Jalan Masjid	042/06/06	SMK St Mark
Telok Ayer Tawar (N06)	Taman Wira	042/06/07	SMK Telok Air Tawar
Telok Ayer Tawar (N06)	Taman Perkasa	042/06/08	SJK (C) Li Hwa

=== Representation history ===
Members of Parliament for Tasek Gelugor
Parliament	No	Years	Member	Party	Vote Share
Constituency created from Kepala Batas, Permatang Pauh and Mata Kuching
7th	P039	1986–1990	Mohammed Yusoff Abdul Latib (محمّد يوسف عبد اللطيب)	BN (UMNO)	15,911; 70.07%
8th	P039	1990–1995	Mohd Shariff Omar (محمد شريف عمر)	BN (UMNO)	20,379; 75.32%
9th	P042	1995–1999	Ibrahim Saad (إبراهيم سعاد)	BN (UMNO)	20,061; 73.03%
10th	P042	1999–2004	Mohd Shariff Omar (محمد شريف عمر)	BN (UMNO)	16,936; 57.15%
11th	P042	2004–2008	Mohd Shariff Omar (محمد شريف عمر)	BN (UMNO)	22,011; 65.05%
12th	P042	2008–2013	Nor Mohamed Yakcop (نور محمد يعقوب)	BN (UMNO)	20,448; 56.25%
13th	P042	2013–2018	Shabudin Yahaya (شهب الدين يحيى)	BN (UMNO)	24,393; 51.53%
14th	P042	2018	Shabudin Yahaya (شهب الدين يحيى)	BN (UMNO)	18,547; 35.73%
14th	P042	2018–2019	Shabudin Yahaya (شهب الدين يحيى)	Independent	18,547; 35.73%
14th	P042	2019–2020	Shabudin Yahaya (شهب الدين يحيى)	PH (BERSATU)	18,547; 35.73%
14th	P042	2020–2022	Shabudin Yahaya (شهب الدين يحيى)	PN (BERSATU)	18,547; 35.73%
15th	P042	2022–2025	Wan Saifulruddin Wan Jan (وان سيفولرودّين وان جان)	PN (BERSATU)	31,116; 46.36%
15th	P042	2025–2026	Wan Saifulruddin Wan Jan (وان سيفولرودّين وان جان)	Independent	31,116; 46.36%
15th	P042	2026–present	Wan Saifulruddin Wan Jan (وان سيفولرودّين وان جان)	PN (WAWASAN)	31,116; 46.36%

=== State constituency ===
Parliamentary constituency	State constituency						
Parliamentary constituency	1955–1959*	1959–1974	1974–1986	1986–1995	1995–2004	2004–2018	2018–present
Tasek Gelugor				Ara Rendang			
Tasek Gelugor					Permatang Berangan		
Tasek Gelugor				Sungai Dua			
Tasek Gelugor				Telok Ayer Tawar			

=== Historical boundaries ===
State Constituency	Area			
State Constituency	1984	1994	2004	2018
Ara Rendang	Ara Kuda; Ara Rendang; Kampung Aman; Padang Menora; Pokok Sena			
Permatang Berangan		Ara Kuda; Ara Rendang; Tasek Gelugor; Padang Menora; Pokok Sena		
Sungai Dua	Guar Kepayang; Maklom; Permatang Tok Jaya; Sungai Dua; Sungai Lokan	Padang Tonson; Pengkalan Macang; Permatang Buloh; Permatang Tok Jaya; Sungai Dua		
Telok Ayer Tawar	Bagan Belat; Geting Bubu; Kampung Contoh; Kuala Bekah; Permatang Panjang	Bagan Belat; Geting Bubu; Kampung Contoh; Permatang Panjang; Telok Ayer Tawar		

=== Current state assembly members ===
No.	State Constituency	Member	Coalition (Party)
N4	Permatang Berangan	Mohd Sobri Saleh	PN (PAS)
N5	Sungai Dua	Muhammad Fauzi Yusoff	PN (PAS)
N6	Telok Ayer Tawar	Azmi Alang	PN (BERSATU)

=== Local governments and postcodes ===
No.	State Constituency	Local Government	Postcode
N4	Permatang Berangan	Seberang Perai City Council	13000,13020, 13050,13800 Butterworth; 13100 Penaga; 13220 Kepala Batas; 13300 Tasek Gelugor
N5	Sungai Dua	Seberang Perai City Council	13000,13020, 13050,13800 Butterworth; 13100 Penaga; 13220 Kepala Batas; 13300 Tasek Gelugor
N6	Telok Ayer Tawar	Seberang Perai City Council	13000,13020, 13050,13800 Butterworth; 13100 Penaga; 13220 Kepala Batas; 13300 Tasek Gelugor

== Election results ==
Malaysian general election, 2022
Party	Candidate	Votes	%	∆%
PN	Wan Saifulruddin Wan Jan	31,116	46.36	▲46.36
BN	Muhamad Yusoff Mohd Noor	18,864	28.11	▼7.62
PH	Nik Abdul Razak Nik Md Ridzuan	16,547	24.66	▲24.66
PEJUANG	Abdul Halim Sirjung	406	0.60	▲0.60
Heritage	Mohd Akmal Azhar	179	0.27	▲0.27
Total valid votes		67,112	100.00	
Total rejected ballots		542		
Unreturned ballots		136		
Turnout		67,790	82.99	▼3.93
Registered electors		80,868		
Majority		12,252	18.25	▲18.10
PN gain from BN		Swing		?
Source(s) https://lom.agc.gov.my/ilims/upload/portal/akta/outputp/1753273/PUB609%20(2022).pdf

Malaysian general election, 2018
Party	Candidate	Votes	%	∆%
BN	Shabudin Yahaya	18,547	35.73	▼15.80
PKR	Marzuki Yahya	18,466	35.58	▲35.58
PAS	Rizal Hafiz Ruslan	14,891	28.69	▼16.42
Total valid votes		51,904	100.00	
Total rejected ballots		689		
Unreturned ballots		297		
Turnout		52,890	86.92	▼2.12
Registered electors		60,850		
Majority		81	0.15	▼6.27
BN hold		Swing		
Source(s) "His Majesty's Government Gazette - Notice of Contested Election, Parliament for the State of Penang [P.U. (B) 236/2018]" (PDF). Attorney General's Chambers of Malaysia. 3 May 2018. "Federal Government Gazette - Results of Contested Election and Statements of the Poll after the Official Addition of Votes, Parliamentary Constituencies for the State of Penang [P.U. (B) 310/2018]" (PDF). Attorney General's Chambers of Malaysia. 28 May 2018. "Damansara parliamentary seat records biggest majority - Nation". The Star Online. 10 May 2018.

Malaysian general election, 2013
Party	Candidate	Votes	%	∆%
BN	Shabudin Yahaya	24,393	51.53	▼4.72
PAS	Abdul Rahman Maidin	21,351	45.11	▲1.36
Independent	Mohd Shariff Omar	1,590	3.36	▲3.36
Total valid votes		47,334	100.00	
Total rejected ballots		675		
Unreturned ballots		112		
Turnout		48,121	89.04	▲5.14
Registered electors		54,042		
Majority		3,042	6.42	▼6.08
BN hold		Swing		
Source(s) "Federal Government Gazette - Notice of Contested Election, Parliament for the State of Penang [P.U. (B) 173/2013]" (PDF). Attorney General's Chambers of Malaysia. 26 April 2013. "Federal Government Gazette - Results of Contested Election and Statements of the Poll after the Official Addition of Votes, Parliamentary Constituencies for the State of Penang [P.U. (B) 214/2013]" (PDF). Attorney General's Chambers of Malaysia. 22 May 2013. Archived from the original (PDF) on 2019-03-22.

Malaysian general election, 2008
Party	Candidate	Votes	%	∆%
BN	Nor Mohamed Yakcop	20,448	56.25	▼8.80
PAS	Ismail Salleh	15,901	43.75	▲8.80
Total valid votes		36,349	100.00	
Total rejected ballots		600		
Unreturned ballots		359		
Turnout		37,308	83.90	▲0.87
Registered electors		44,466		
Majority		4,547	12.50	▼17.60
BN hold		Swing		

Malaysian general election, 2004
Party	Candidate	Votes	%	∆%
BN	Mohd Shariff Omar	22,011	65.05	▲7.90
PAS	Mujahid Yusof	11,828	34.95	▲34.95
Total valid votes		33,839	100.00	
Total rejected ballots		620		
Unreturned ballots		92		
Turnout		34,551	83.03	▲3.01
Registered electors		41,612		
Majority		10,183	30.10	▲15.80
BN hold		Swing		

Malaysian general election, 1999
Party	Candidate	Votes	%	∆%
BN	Mohd Shariff Omar	16,936	57.15	▼15.88
PKR	Ahmad Rosli Ayob	12,700	42.85	▲42.85
Total valid votes		29,636	100.00	
Total rejected ballots		587		
Unreturned ballots		745		
Turnout		30,968	80.02	▲3.00
Registered electors		38,700		
Majority		4,236	14.30	▼31.76
BN hold		Swing		

Malaysian general election, 1995
Party	Candidate	Votes	%	∆%
BN	Ibrahim Saad	20,061	73.03	▼2.29
PAS	Mohd Salleh Man	7,410	26.97	▲2.29
Total valid votes		27,471	100.00	
Total rejected ballots		951		
Unreturned ballots		116		
Turnout		28,538	77.02	▼2.13
Registered electors		37,052		
Majority		12,651	46.06	▼4.58
BN hold		Swing		

Malaysian general election, 1990
Party	Candidate	Votes	%	∆%
BN	Mohd Shariff Omar	20,379	75.32	▲5.25
PAS	Shuaib Jaafar	6,679	24.68	▼5.25
Total valid votes		27,058	100.00	
Total rejected ballots		823		
Unreturned ballots		0		
Turnout		27,881	79.15	▲4.14
Registered electors		35,227		
Majority		13,700	50.64	▲10.50
BN hold		Swing		

Malaysian general election, 1986
Party	Candidate	Votes	%
BN	Mohammed Yusoff Abdul Latib	15,911	70.07
PAS	Yusof Abdullah	6,796	29.93
Total valid votes		22,707	100.00
Total rejected ballots		562	
Unreturned ballots		0	
Turnout		23,269	75.01
Registered electors		31,021	
Majority		9,115	40.14
This was a new constituency created.
