= 2013 Malaysian Chinese Association leadership election =

- 21 December 2013
Candidate	Liow Tiong Lai
Popular vote	1,186
President of MCA before election
Chua Soi Lek
President of MCA
Liow Tiong Lai

A leadership election was held by the Malaysian Chinese Association (MCA) on 21 December 2013. It was won by the then Deputy President of MCA, Liow Tiong Lai.

== Central Committee election results ==
=== President ===
Candidate	Delegates' votes
Liow Tiong Lai	1,186 votes
Gan Ping Sieu	1,000 votes
Ong Tee Keat	160 votes

=== Deputy President ===
Candidate	Delegates' votes
Wee Ka Siong	1,408 votes
Donald Lim Siang Chai	927 votes

=== Vice Presidents ===
Candidate	Delegates' votes (max. 4)
Lee Chee Leong	1,642 votes
Hou Kok Chung	1,475 votes
Chua Tee Yong	1,343 votes
Chew Mei Fun	1,230 votes
Wee Jeck Seng	1,199 votes
Kong Cho Ha	775 votes
Lee Wee Kiat	721 votes
Chong Itt Chew	685 votes
Leong Yong Kong	286 votes

=== Central Working Committee Members ===
Candidate	Delegates' votes (max. 25)
Mah Hang Soon	2,023 votes
Koh Nai Kwong	1,743 votes
Toh Chin Yaw	1,711 votes
Lua Choon Hann	1,601 votes
Ong Ka Chuan	1,525 votes
Teoh Sew Hock	1,455 votes
Gan Tian Loo	1,330 votes
Chin Tung Leong	1,319 votes
Lee Hong Tee	1,283 votes
Paul Kong Sing Chu	1,279 votes
Chai Kim Sen	1,262 votes
Boey Chin Gan	1,255 votes
Ooi Siew Kim	1,250 votes
Lim Chin Fui	1,245 votes
Tan Cher Puk	1,219 votes
Ooi Eyan Hian	1,205 votes
Hoh Khai Mun	1,204 votes
Yoo Wei How	1,204 votes
Ei Kim Hock	1,185 votes
Tan Teik Cheng	1,175 votes
Ng Chok Sin	1,172 votes
Chuah Poh Khiang	1,152 votes
Tan Chin Meng	1,139 votes
Ti Lian Ker	1,138 votes
Por Choo Chor	1,123 votes
Teh Kim Poo	1,118 votes
Tee Hooi Ling	1,118 votes
Lee Ban Seng	1,065 votes
Lau Lee	1,047 votes
Tan Chong Seng	1,043 votes
Wong Koon Mun	1,041 votes
Edward Khoo Keok Hai	1,023 votes
Koh Chin Han	1,017 votes
Chew Kok Woh	937 votes
Loh Seng Kok	917 votes
Teh Chai Aan	895 votes
Goh Tee Tee	875 votes
Wong Tat Chee	811 votes
Yee Hee Leong	800 votes
Low Kim Mang	762 votes
Chew Yin Keen	760 votes
Sim Eng Peng	754 votes
Frankie Gan Joon Zin	736 votes
Tan Lee Huat	729 votes
Kow Cheong Wei	728 votes
Tan Seong Lim	680 votes
Tan Ken Ten	645 votes
Wong Kooi Fong	510 votes
Chiew Lian Keng	509 votes
Daniel Ling Sia Chin	482 votes
Tan Teck Poh	463 votes
Ong Soon Boon	383 votes
Leong Kok Wee	377 votes
Chin Hong Vui	317 votes
Chee Ah Ken	292 votes
Khoo Chin Nam	290 votes
Yap Ching Leong	264 votes
Gan Chee Biow	240 votes
