= Labis (federal constituency) =

Federal constituency in Johor, Malaysia

Labis (P142)
Johor constituency

Federal constituency
- Legislature: Dewan Rakyat
- MP: Pang Hok Liong; PH
- Constituency created: 1974
- First contested: 1974
- Last contested: 2022

Demographics
- Population (2020): 42,404
- Electors (2022): 49,846
- Area (km²): 1,374
- Pop. density (per km²): 30.9

Labis is a federal constituency in Segamat District, Johor, Malaysia, that has been represented in the Dewan Rakyat since 1974.

The federal constituency was created in the 1974 redistribution and is mandated to return a single member to the Dewan Rakyat under the first past the post voting system.

== Demographics ==
Ethnic breakdown of Labis's electorate as of 2022
1. Chinese (43.6%)
2. Malay (37.7%)
3. Indian (15.3%)
4. Other ethnicities (3.40%)

As of 2020, Labis has a population of 42,404 people.

Age breakdown of Labis's electorate as of 2022
1. 18-20 (4.79%)
2. 21-29 (17.9%)
3. 30-39 (20.7%)
4. 40-49 (17.9%)
5. 50-59 (16.0%)
6. 60-69 (12.6%)
7. 70-79 (7.01%)
8. 80-89 (2.63%)
9. above 90 (0.55%)
Gender breakdown of Labis's electorate as of 2022
1. Male (50.3%)
2. Female (49.7%)

== History ==
=== Polling districts ===
According to the gazette issued on 31 October 2022, the Labis constituency has a total of 34 polling districts.

State constituency	Polling Districts	Code	Location
Tenang (N05)	Kampong Redong	142/05/01	SK Kampung Tenang
Tenang (N05)	Pekan Ayer Panas	142/05/02	SA Ismail Ariffin
Tenang (N05)	Ladang Labis Utara	142/05/03	Dewan Masyarakat Ladang North Labis
Tenang (N05)	Bandar Labis Timor	142/05/04	Dewan Serbaguna Kampung Paya Merah
Tenang (N05)	Bandar Labis Tengah	142/05/05	SMK Kamarul Ariffin
Tenang (N05)	Labis	142/05/06	Dewan Bola Keranjang JKKK Labis; Dewan Yong Hock Kiong
Tenang (N05)	FELDA Tenang	142/05/07	SK LKTP Tenang
Tenang (N05)	Sawah Bahru	142/05/08	SK Sawah Bahru
Tenang (N05)	Tenang Station	142/05/09	SMK Tenang Station
Tenang (N05)	Ladang Bukit Dato	142/05/10	SJK (T) Ladang Voules
Tenang (N05)	Chemplak Barat	142/05/11	SA LKTP Chempelak Barat
Tenang (N05)	Chemplak	142/05/12	SK LKTP Chemplak
Bekok (N06)	Bandar Labis Selatan	142/06/01	SK Labis
Bekok (N06)	Bandar Labis Barat	142/06/02	SMK Munshi Ibrahim
Bekok (N06)	Sungai Karas	142/06/03	SJK (C) Sungai Karas
Bekok (N06)	Kampong Panchajaya	142/06/04	Balai Raya Kampung Panchajaya
Bekok (N06)	Kampong Kudong	142/06/05	SK Kampung Kudong
Bekok (N06)	Ladang Kempas	142/06/06	Pusat Jagaan Kanak-Kanak Ladang Gunung Mas (Div)
Bekok (N06)	Kampong Bahru Bekok Barat	142/06/07	SMK Bekok
Bekok (N06)	Kampong Bahru Bekok Tengah	142/06/08	SJK (C) Bekok
Bekok (N06)	Kampong Bahru Bekok Timor	142/06/09	SK Seri Bekok
Bekok (N06)	Bandar Bekok	142/06/10	SJK (T) Bekok
Bekok (N06)	Ladang Getah Eldred Bekok	142/06/11	Dewan Orang Ramai Ladang Eldred
Bekok (N06)	Johor Labis 'A'	142/06/12	Balai Raya Claire 1 Ladang Claire Chaah
Bekok (N06)	Chaah Barat	142/06/13	SMK Chaah
Bekok (N06)	Bandar Chaah Utara	142/06/14	Dewan Serbaguna Chaah
Bekok (N06)	Bandar Chaah Tengah	142/06/15	SJK (C) Chaah
Bekok (N06)	Bandar Chaah Selatan	142/06/16	SA Chaah
Bekok (N06)	Kampong Jawa Chaah	142/06/17	SK Seri Bali
Bekok (N06)	Chaah Timor	142/06/18	SJK (T) Cantuman Chaah
Bekok (N06)	Chan Wing	142/06/19	Dewan Orang Ramai Ladang Gunung Mas
Bekok (N06)	Ladang Gerchang	142/06/20	Balai Raya Ladang Sungai Gerchang Bahagian 2
Bekok (N06)	Desa Temu Jodoh	142/06/21	SK Desa Temu Jodoh
Bekok (N06)	Perling	142/06/22	SK Seri Labis

=== Representation history ===
Members of Parliament for Labis
Parliament	No	Years	Member	Party	Vote Share
Constituency created from Segamat Utara and Segamat Selatan
4th	P099	1974–1978	Musa Hitam (موسى هيتم)	BN (UMNO)	Uncontested
5th	P099	1978–1982	Musa Hitam (موسى هيتم)	BN (UMNO)	19,576; 88.04%
6th	P099	1982–1986	Bahari Haron (بحري هارون)	BN (UMNO)	Uncontested
7th	P118	1986–1990¹	Ling Liong Sik (林良实)	BN (MCA)	18,182; 67.96%
8th	P118	1990–1995	Ling Liong Sik (林良实)	BN (MCA)	17,710; 58.65%
9th	P128	1995–1999	Ling Liong Sik (林良实)	BN (MCA)	24,185; 72.57%
10th	P128	1999–2004	Ling Liong Sik (林良实)	BN (MCA)	23,709; 70.53%
11th	P142	2004–2008	Chua Soi Lek (蔡细历)	BN (MCA)	16,469; 74.15%
11th	P142	2008	Vacant		
12th	P142	2008–2013	Chua Tee Yong (蔡智勇)	BN (MCA)	13,658; 58.81%
13th	P142	2013–2018	Chua Tee Yong (蔡智勇)	BN (MCA)	15,821; 50.56%
14th	P142	2018–2022	Pang Hok Liong (彭学良)	PH (DAP)	16,709; 52.17%
15th	P142	2022–present	Pang Hok Liong (彭学良)	PH (DAP)	16,133; 46.43%

Note: ^{1}Noted that in 1984 redelineation exercise this Labis constituency is now shifted south to Labis city centre from former Segamat constituency, not Segamat, Johor in Segamat District where now renamed as Segamat.

=== State constituency ===
Parliamentary constituency	State constituency						
Parliamentary constituency	1954–59*	1959–1974	1974–1986	1986–1995	1995–2004	2004–2018	2018–present
Labis			Ayer Panas				
Labis				Bekok			
Labis			Buloh Kasap				
Labis				Tenang			

=== Historical boundaries ===
State Constituency	Area				
State Constituency	1974	1984	1994	2003	2018
Ayer Panas	Bukit Siput; FELDA Kemelah; Kampung Tengah; Labis; Tenang				
Bekok		Bekok; Chaah; Desa Temu Jodoh; Kampung Kudong; Labis	Bekok; Chaah; Desa Temu Jodoh; FELDA Maokil; Labis	Bekok; Chaah; Desa Temu Jodoh; Kampung Kudong; Labis	
Buloh Kasap	Batu Anam; Buloh Kasap; FELDA Palong Timor; FELDA Pemanis; Taman Yayasan				
Tenang		Air Panas; Bukit Siput; FELDA Chemplak; FELDA Kemelah; FELDA Tenang		Air Panas; FELDA Chemplak; FELDA Tenang; Kampung Redong; Sungai Kras	Air Panas; Kampung Sawah Padi; FELDA Chemplak; FELDA Tenang; Sungai Kras

=== Current state assembly members ===
No.	State Constituency	Member	Coalition (Party)
N05	Tenang	Mohd Azahar Ibrahim	BN (UMNO)
N06	Bekok	Tan Chong	BN (MCA)

=== Local governments & postcodes ===
No.	State Constituency	Local Government	Postcode
N05	Tenang	Labis District Council	85300 Labis; 85400 Chaah; 86500 Bekok
N06	Bekok	Labis District Council	85300 Labis; 85400 Chaah; 86500 Bekok

== Election results ==
Malaysian general election, 2022
Party	Candidate	Votes	%	∆%
PH	Pang Hok Liong	16,133	46.43	▲46.43
BN	Chua Tee Yong	13,300	38.28	▼3.25
PN	Alvin Chang Teck Kiam	5,312	15.29	▲15.29
Total valid votes		34,745	100.00	
Total rejected ballots		434		
Unreturned ballots		92		
Turnout		34,743	69.70	▼1.06
Registered electors		49,846		
Majority		2,833	8.15	▼2.49
PH hold		Swing		
Source(s) https://lom.agc.gov.my/ilims/upload/portal/akta/outputp/1753254/PUB%20617%20PARLIMEN%20JOHOR.pdf

Malaysian general election, 2018
Party	Candidate	Votes	%	∆%
PKR	Pang Hok Liong	16,709	52.17	▲52.17
BN	Chua Tee Yong	13,301	41.53	▼9.03
PAS	Sarchu Sawal	2,020	6.30	▲6.30
Total valid votes		32,030	100.00	
Total rejected ballots		485		
Unreturned ballots		78		
Turnout		32,593	80.76	▼4.16
Registered electors		40,356		
Majority		3,408	10.64	▲9.52
PKR gain from BN		Swing		?
Source(s) "His Majesty's Government Gazette - Notice of Contested Election, Parliament for the State of Johore [P.U. (B) 244/2018]" (PDF). Attorney General's Chambers of Malaysia. 3 May 2018. Archived from the original (PDF) on 2019-12-29. "Federal Government Gazette - Results of Contested Election and Statements of the Poll after the Official Addition of Votes, Parliamentary Constituencies for the State of Johore [P.U. (B) 318/2018]" (PDF). Attorney General's Chambers of Malaysia. 28 May 2018.

Malaysian general election, 2013
Party	Candidate	Votes	%	∆%
BN	Chua Tee Yong	15,821	50.56	▼8.25
DAP	Ramakrishnan Suppiah	15,468	49.44	▲8.25
Total valid votes		31,289	100.00	
Total rejected ballots		689		
Unreturned ballots		49		
Turnout		32,027	84.92	▲12.97
Registered electors		37,714		
Majority		353	1.12	▼16.50
BN hold		Swing		
Source(s) "Federal Government Gazette - Notice of Contested Election, Parliament for the State of Johore [P.U. (B) 181/2013]" (PDF). Attorney General's Chambers of Malaysia. 26 April 2013. "Federal Government Gazette - Results of Contested Election and Statements of the Poll after the Official Addition of Votes, Parliamentary Constituencies for the State of Johore [P.U. (B) 222/2013]" (PDF). Attorney General's Chambers of Malaysia. 22 May 2013.

Malaysian general election, 2008
Party	Candidate	Votes	%	∆%
BN	Chua Tee Yong	13,658	58.81	▼15.34
DAP	Teo Eng Ching	9,564	41.19	▲15.34
Total valid votes		23,222	100.00	
Total rejected ballots		816		
Unreturned ballots		42		
Turnout		24,080	71.95	▲1.00
Registered electors		33,468		
Majority		4,094	17.62	▲30.68
BN hold		Swing		

Malaysian general election, 2004
Party	Candidate	Votes	%	∆%
BN	Chua Soi Lek @ Chua Kin Seng	16,469	74.15	▲3.62
DAP	Tee Gey Yan	5,740	25.85	▼3.62
Total valid votes		22,209	100.00	
Total rejected ballots		839		
Unreturned ballots		25		
Turnout		23,073	70.95	▼0.49
Registered electors		32,520		
Majority		10,729	48.30	▲7.24
BN hold		Swing		

Malaysian general election, 1999
Party	Candidate	Votes	%	∆%
BN	Lim Liong Seek @ Ling Liong Sik	23,709	70.53	▼2.04
DAP	Ahmad Ton	9,908	29.47	▲2.04
Total valid votes		33,617	100.00	
Total rejected ballots		1,075		
Unreturned ballots		83		
Turnout		34,775	71.44	▼1.73
Registered electors		48,677		
Majority		13,801	41.06	▼4.08
BN hold		Swing		

Malaysian general election, 1995
Party	Candidate	Votes	%	∆%
BN	Lim Liong Seek @ Ling Liong Sik	24,185	72.57	▲13.92
DAP	Ahmad Ton	9,140	27.43	▼13.92
Total valid votes		33,325	100.00	
Total rejected ballots		1,322		
Unreturned ballots		46		
Turnout		34,693	73.17	▼0.89
Registered electors		47,414		
Majority		15,045	45.14	▲27.84
BN hold		Swing		

Malaysian general election, 1990
Party	Candidate	Votes	%	∆%
BN	Lim Liong Seek @ Ling Liong Sik	17,710	58.65	▼9.31
DAP	Ahmad Ton	12,485	41.35	▲9.31
Total valid votes		30,195	100.00	
Total rejected ballots		1,097		
Unreturned ballots		0		
Turnout		31,292	74.06	▲1.80
Registered electors		42,252		
Majority		5,225	17.30	▼18.62
BN hold		Swing		

Malaysian general election, 1986
Party	Candidate	Votes	%	∆%
BN	Lim Liong Seek @ Ling Liong Sik	18,182	67.96	▲67.96
DAP	Tan Tien Lim	8,571	32.04	▲32.04
Total valid votes		26,753	100.00	
Total rejected ballots		897		
Unreturned ballots		0		
Turnout		27,650	72.26	
Registered electors		38,264		
Majority		9,611	35.92	
BN hold		Swing		

Malaysian general election, 1982
Party	Candidate	Votes	%	∆%
On the nomination day, Bahari Haron won uncontested.
BN	Bahari Haron			
Total valid votes			100.00	
Total rejected ballots				
Unreturned ballots				
Turnout				
Registered electors		36,950		
Majority				
BN hold		Swing		

Malaysian general election, 1978
Party	Candidate	Votes	%	∆%
BN	Musa Hitam	19,576	88.04	▲88.04
PAS	Jamal Ahmad	2,659	11.96	▲11.96
Total valid votes		22,235	100.00	
Total rejected ballots		1,538		
Unreturned ballots		0		
Turnout		23,773	78.45	
Registered electors		30,305		
Majority		16,917	76.08	
BN hold		Swing		

Malaysian general election, 1974
Party	Candidate	Votes	%
On the nomination day, Musa Hitam won uncontested.
BN	Musa Hitam		
Total valid votes			100.00
Total rejected ballots			
Unreturned ballots			
Turnout			
Registered electors		24,607	
Majority			
This was a new constituency created.
