= Himpunan Hijau =

Environmental organisation in Malaysia

Himpunan Hijau Green Assembly
- Founded: March 2011
- Type: Non-profit; NGO
- Location: Kuantan
- Fields: Environment
- Key people: Wong Tack (Founder/Chairperson)
- Website: stoplynas.org/tag/himpunan-hijau/

Himpunan Hijau (English: "Green Assembly" or "Green Rally") is a Malaysian environmentalist movement protesting against the Lynas Advanced Materials Plant (LAMP), a rare earth processing plant operating in Gebeng, Kuantan, Pahang set up by the Australian company Lynas. The refinery process is accused of dumping tonnes of toxic and radioactive waste on the local lives, livelihoods, the environment and the health of future generations. The Save Malaysia Stop Lynas (SMSL) group is currently led by the Member of Parliament for Bentong; Wong Tack.

The refining facility entered production in 2013, producing 1,089 tonnes of rare earth oxides in the first quarter of 2014, with a target of 11,000 tonnes per annum. On 2 September 2014, Lynas was issued a 2-year Full Operating Stage License (FOSL) by the Malaysian Atomic Energy Licensing Board (AELB).

== See also ==
- Environment of Malaysia
- Lynas
- Wong Tack
