= Chuah Boon Seong =

Malaysian politician

Yang Berbahagia Dato' Chuah Boon Seong DIMP SMP
- 蔡文祥

Member of the Pahang State Legislative Assembly for Mentakab
- In office 21 March 2004 – 5 May 2013
- Preceded by: constituency renamed from Sanggang
- Succeeded by: Tengku Zulpuri Shah Raja Puji (PR–DAP)
- Majority: 3,956 (2004); 2,439 (2008)

Personal details
- Party: Malaysian Chinese Association (MCA) (–2017); Independent (2017–present)
- Other political affiliations: Barisan Nasional (BN) (–2017)
- Occupation: Politician

Chuah Boon Seong is a Malaysian politician who served as Member of the Pahang State Legislative Assembly (MLA) for Mentakab from March 2004 to May 2013. He is an independent politician and was a member of Malaysian Chinese Association (MCA), a component party of Barisan Nasional (BN) coalition.

== Political career ==
Chuah Boon Seong first elected as Pahang Mentakab assemblyman in 2004 general election with majority of 3,956 votes. He was reelected in 2008 general election with reduce majority of 2,439 votes. He was failed reelected in 2013 general election, lost to Tengku Zulpuri Shah from DAP. In 2017, he quit MCA and contest on Independent ticket on Mentakab seat in upcoming general election. In 2018 general election, he lost in three corner fight with Keadilan, PAS and BN with he gather around 958 votes and lost deposit.

== Election results ==
Pahang State Legislative Assembly
Year	Constituency	Candidate	Votes	Pct	Opponent(s)	Votes	Pct	Ballots cast	Majority	Turnout
2004	N30 Mentakab	Chuah Boon Seong (MCA)	7,316	68.53%	Ng Kwi Ling (DAP)	3,360	31.47%	11,320	3,956	74.95%
2008	N30 Mentakab	Chuah Boon Seong (MCA)	6,321	56.96%	Ng Kwi Ling (DAP)	3,882	34.98%	11,463	2,439	75.70%
2008	N30 Mentakab	Chuah Boon Seong (MCA)	6,321	56.96%	Mohd Shokri Mahmood (IND)	863	7.78%	11,463	2,439	75.70%
2013	N30 Mentakab	Chuah Boon Seong (MCA)	6,328	44.53%	Tengku Zulpuri Shah Raja Puji (DAP)	7,882	55.47%	14,430	1,554	84.93%
2018	N30 Mentakab	Chuah Boon Seong (IND)	958	4.61%	Woo Chee Wan (DAP)	10,547	50.78%	20,771	5,829	81.68%
2018	N30 Mentakab	Chuah Boon Seong (IND)	958	4.61%	Abirerah Awang Chik (PAS)	4,718	22.71%	20,771	5,829	81.68%
2018	N30 Mentakab	Chuah Boon Seong (IND)	958	4.61%	Wong Tat Chee (MCA)	4,548	21.90%	20,771	5,829	81.68%

== Honours ==
- Pahang
  - Knight Companion of the Order of the Crown of Pahang (DIMP) – Dato' (2009)
  - Companion of the Order of the Crown of Pahang (SMP) (2007)
