= Young Syefura Othman =

Malaysian politician and nurse

Yang Berhormat Puan Young Syefura Othman MP
- يوڠ شفورة عثمان

Assistant National Publicity Secretary of the Democratic Action Party
- Incumbent
- Assumed office 16 March 2025 Serving with Wong Shu Qi
- Secretary-General: Anthony Loke Siew Fook
- National Publicity Secretary: Yeo Bee Yin
- Preceded by: Hannah Yeoh Tseow Suan

Vice Women Chief of the Democratic Action Party
- Incumbent
- Assumed office 9 September 2023 Serving with Kasthuriraani Patto
- Secretary-General: Anthony Loke Siew Fook
- Women Chief: Teo Nie Ching

Deputy Youth Chief of the Democratic Action Party
- In office 19 March 2022 – 17 November 2024
- Secretary-General: Lim Guan Eng (19−20 March 2022); Anthony Loke Siew Fook (2022–2024)
- Youth Chief: Kelvin Yii Lee Wuen
- Preceded by: Chiong Yoke Kong
- Succeeded by: Wayne Ong Chun Wei

State Vice Chairperson of the Democratic Action Party of Pahang
- Incumbent
- Assumed office 1 September 2024 Serving with Woo Chee Wan
- Secretary-General: Anthony Loke Siew Fook
- State Chairman: Lee Chin Chen
- Preceded by: Tengku Zulpuri Shah Raja Puji

Member of the Malaysian Parliament for Bentong
- Incumbent
- Assumed office 19 November 2022
- Preceded by: Wong Tack (PH−DAP)
- Majority: 692 (2022)

Member of the Pahang State Legislative Assembly for Ketari
- In office 9 May 2018 – 19 November 2022
- Preceded by: Lee Chin Chen (PR–DAP)
- Succeeded by: Thomas Su Keong Siong (PH–DAP)
- Majority: 3,710 (2018)

Personal details
- Born: Young Syefura binti Othman; 9 November 1989 (age 36) Sitiawan, Perak, Malaysia
- Citizenship: Malaysian
- Party: Democratic Action Party (DAP) (since 2013)
- Other political affiliations: Pakatan Rakyat (PR) (2013–2015); Pakatan Harapan (PH) (since 2015)
- Spouses: Mohd Masyhur Abdullah (m. 2016; div. 2019) Mohd Edrin Nordin (m. 2021; div. 2024)
- Education: Windfield International College
- Occupation: Politician
- Profession: Nurse
- Website: youngsyefura.com

Young Syefura Othman (born 9 November 1989), nicknamed Rara, is a Malaysian politician and nurse who has served as the Member of Parliament (MP) for Bentong since November 2022. She served as Member of the Pahang State Legislative Assembly (MLA) for Ketari from May 2018 to November 2022. She is a member of the Democratic Action Party, a component party of the Pakatan Harapan (PH) and formerly Pakatan Rakyat (PR) coalitions. She has served as the Assistant National Publicity Secretary of DAP since March 2025, Vice Women Chief of DAP since September 2023 and State Vice Chairperson of DAP of Pahang since September 2024. She also served as Deputy Youth Chief of DAP from March 2022 to November 2024. Additionally, she is the first Bentong MP of the Malay ethnicity, the first female Malay MP of DAP in Malaysian history and presently the youngest MP of DAP at the age of 36 years, 329 days.

== Personal life ==
Young Syefura is a sixth of seven children. She idolises the Minister of Youth and Sports Hannah Yeoh in politics.

=== Miscarriage of pregnancy ===
On 10 November 2022 during her 33rd birthday, Young Syefura was confirmed to have suffered a miscarriage after eight weeks of pregnancy and was resting at home. She also revealed that she had initially wanted to announce her pregnancy after the 2022 general election with a photograph of her home pregnancy test. She also shared that her pregnancy had appeared to stall after six weeks. She then thanked those who have extended their messages of support to her. Upon hearing the news, her opponent, fellow candidate for the Bentong federal seat in the election and former Bentong MP Liow Tiong Lai from the opposing Barisan Nasional (BN) and the Malaysian Chinese Association (MCA) expressed his sadness and sent his best and sincerest wishes and care for Young Syefura to recuperate well. In response, Young Syefura thanked Liow and apologised for her absence in the PH and DAP operations room and being unable to meet him during the campaign trail and his visit to there as she was at home. The reported reason for her miscarriage was overwork. Despite being at home, her campaign carried on without her presence.

== Election results ==
Pahang State Legislative Assembly
Year	Constituency	Candidate	Votes	Pct	Opponent(s)	Votes	Pct	Ballots cast	Majority	Turnout
2018	N34 Ketari	Young Syefura Othman (DAP)	9,873	51.17%	Lau Hoi Keong (MCA)	6,163	31.94%	19,296	3,710	83.80%
2018	N34 Ketari	Young Syefura Othman (DAP)	9,873	51.17%	Roslan Md Esa (PAS)	3,260	16.89%	19,296	3,710	83.80%

Parliament of Malaysia
Year	Constituency	Candidate	Votes	Pct	Opponent(s)	Votes	Pct	Ballots cast	Majority	Turnout
2022	P089 Bentong	Young Syefura Othman (DAP)	25,075	37.62%	Liow Tiong Lai (MCA)	24,383	36.58%	66,657	692	76.57%
2022	P089 Bentong	Young Syefura Othman (DAP)	25,075	37.62%	Roslan Hassan (BERSATU)	16,233	24.35%	66,657	692	76.57%
2022	P089 Bentong	Young Syefura Othman (DAP)	25,075	37.62%	Wong Tack (IND)	798	1.20%	66,657	692	76.57%
2022	P089 Bentong	Young Syefura Othman (DAP)	25,075	37.62%	Mohd Khalil Abdul Hamid (IND)	168	0.25%	66,657	692	76.57%

== Honours ==
=== Honours of Malaysia ===
- Malaysia
  - Recipient of the 17th Yang di-Pertuan Agong Installation Medal (2024)
