= Wong Tack =

Malaysian politician

- 黄德

Member of the Malaysian Parliament for Bentong
- In office 9 May 2018 – 19 November 2022
- Preceded by: Liow Tiong Lai (BN−MCA)
- Succeeded by: Young Syefura Othman (PH−DAP)
- Majority: 2,032 (2018)

Faction represented in Dewan Rakyat
- 2018–2022: Pakatan Harapan

Personal details
- Born: Wong Tack; 14 March 1959 (age 67) Seri Telemong, Bentong, Pahang, Federation of Malaya (now Malaysia)
- Citizenship: Malaysian
- Party: Democratic Action Party (DAP) (–2022); Independent (since 2022)
- Other political affiliations: Pakatan Rakyat (PR) (2008–2015); Pakatan Harapan (PH) (2015–2022)
- Children: 3
- Occupation: Politician; environmentalist
- Website: wongtack.com
- Wong Tack on Facebook; Wong Tack on Parliament of Malaysia

Wong Tack

Chinese name
- Traditional Chinese: 黃德
- Simplified Chinese: 黄德
Transcriptions
Standard Mandarin
- Hanyu Pinyin: Huáng Dé
Hakka
- Pha̍k-fa-sṳ: Vòng Tet
Yue: Cantonese
- Jyutping: Wong4 Dak1
Southern Min
- Hokkien POJ: N̂g Tek

Wong Tack (simplified Chinese: 黄德; traditional Chinese: 黃德; pinyin: Huáng Dé; Jyutping: Wong4 Dak1; Pe̍h-ōe-jī: N̂g Tek; Pha̍k-fa-sṳ: Vòng Tet) is a Malaysian politician and environmentalist who served as the Member of Parliament (MP) for Bentong from May 2018 to November 2022. He is an independent and was a member of the Democratic Action Party (DAP), a component party of the Pakatan Harapan (PH) and formerly Pakatan Rakyat (PR) coalition.

== Background ==
Wong was born in Seri Telemong, Bentong, Pahang and had stayed in Sabah for a few years. He is a Malaysian Chinese of Hakka descent (despite the dominant dialect group in Pahang state is predominantly of Cantonese origin, but both subgroups share the same ancestral province in China which is Guangdong).

In November 2018, Wong was revealed as the poorest MP in the asset declaration list with a monthly income of RM22,412.64 as shown in the Malaysian Anti-Corruption Commission (MACC) official website.

== Environment activism ==
Wong was the chairperson of Himpunan Hijau, or Green Assembly a Malaysian environmentalist movement protesting against the Lynas Advanced Materials Plant (LAMP), a rare earth processing plant operating in Gebeng, Kuantan, Pahang which he founded in 2011. The Save Malaysia Stop Lynas (SMSL) group is currently led by Wong.

== Political career ==
=== Member of Parliament (2018–2022) ===
==== 2018 general election ====
Wong for the first time was fielded in the 2013 general election as DAP candidate to contest the Bentong parliamentary seat and has come close to defeat the incumbent, Malaysian Chinese Association (MCA) president Liow Tiong Lai, losing by a total 379 votes. In the 2018 general election he recontested again and turned the table to defeat Liow for the Bentong parliamentary seat with a 2,032 majority.

==== 2022 general election ====
On 26 October 2022, DAP announced that Wong had been dropped by the party to contest for the Bentong seat in the 2022 general election. Instead, DAP decided to field its Deputy Youth Chief and Member of the Pahang State Legislative Assembly (MLA) for Ketari Young Syefura Othman to contest for the seat. DAP Secretary-General Anthony Loke justified that Young Syefura was the most winnable candidate. Loke also revealed that Wong had been offered to contest for the Cameron Highlands seat, Wong however had rejected it and Loke expressed his respect towards his rejection. In strong response, Wong broke ranks with the party and announced that he would seek reelection as the Bentong MP by contesting for the Bentong seat as an independent candidate for the very first time, which was against the party rules and discipline as well as facing the risks of costing him the party membership. He stressed that Bentong was his hometown and there was no need for him to move away from Bentong as well as taking swipe at the party for its internal politicking and power struggles, he also distanced himself and his people from them, noting that the people have the rights to decide their own paths and destiny. Furthermore, he slammed the party for reneging on an understanding between them on allowing him to carry on championing green issues after spearheading the "Himpunan Hijau" (green gathering) movement in the 2013 general election. In addition, he praised his own track record serving as the Bentong MP from 2018 to 2022 for 4 years and renewing his strong commitment to serve Bentong and its people. Former Bentong MP Liow criticised DAP for dropping Wong, who he said had underperformed as the Bentong MP and likening this to stealing the chance of the Bentong voters to punish Wong by not voting for him, he also described DAP as opportunistic given its decision to drop underperformed incumbents as candidates for reelection to garner more votes.

On 5 November 2022, as shown and proved by his previous response, he nominated himself as the independent candidate to contest for the Bentong seat in the election. He also added that following this, he was no longer a DAP member. He also criticised "party politics", citing that party members have to listen to the instructions of party leaders, but he only believes in "people's politics" and would only listen to the instructions of the people. He also revealed that he was using the symbol of hoe on the ballot papers and likening it as "using the hoe to open the ground, plant the seeds of hope" and hoping for the support of the people. In addition, he rendered his support to Leader of the Opposition, Chairman of the Pakatan Harapan (PH) and President of the People's Justice Party (PKR) Anwar Ibrahim as the prime minister candidate.

In the election, Wong was not reelected as the Bentong MP for a second term after losing to Young Syefura of PH by a minority of 24,277 votes.

== Election results ==
Parliament of Malaysia
Year	Constituency	Candidate	Votes	Pct	Opponent(s)	Votes	Pct	Ballots cast	Majority	Turnout
2013	P089 Bentong	Wong Tack (DAP)	25,568	49.63%	Liow Tiong Lai (MCA)	25,947	50.37%	51,515	379	84.52%
2018	P089 Bentong	Wong Tack (DAP)	25,716	46.67%	Liow Tiong Lai (MCA)	23,684	42.98%	55,106	2,032	83.40%
2018	P089 Bentong	Wong Tack (DAP)	25,716	46.67%	Balasubramaniam Nachiapan (PAS)	5,706	10.35%	55,106	2,032	83.40%
2022	P089 Bentong	Wong Tack (IND)	798	1.20%	Young Syefura Othman (DAP)	25,075	37.62%	66,657	692	76.57%
2022	P089 Bentong	Wong Tack (IND)	798	1.20%	Liow Tiong Lai (MCA)	24,383	36.58%	66,657	692	76.57%
2022	P089 Bentong	Wong Tack (IND)	798	1.20%	Roslan Hassan (BERSATU)	16,233	24.35%	66,657	692	76.57%
2022	P089 Bentong	Wong Tack (IND)	798	1.20%	Mohd Khalil Abdul Hamid (IND)	168	0.25%	66,657	692	76.57%

== See also ==
- Bentong (federal constituency)
- Himpunan Hijau
- Lynas
