= Lim Ah Lek =

Malaysian politician

Yang Berbahagia Tan Sri Lim Ah Lek PSM SSAP SIMP DSAP SSIS SMT JP
- 林亚礼

Minister of Human Resources
- In office 26 October 1990 – 14 December 1999
- Monarchs: Azlan Shah; Ja'afar; Salahuddin
- Prime Minister: Mahathir Mohamad
- Preceded by: himself as Minister of Labour
- Succeeded by: Fong Chan Onn
- Constituency: Bentong

Member of the Malaysian Parliament for Bentong
- In office 13 May 1989 – 14 December 1999
- Preceded by: Chan Siang Sun (BN–MCA)
- Succeeded by: Liow Tiong Lai (BN–MCA)
- Majority: 8,506 (1989); 12,111 (1990); 18,789 (1995)

Personal details
- Born: 1942 (age 83–84)
- Citizenship: Malaysian
- Party: Malaysian Chinese Association (MCA)
- Other political affiliations: Barisan Nasional (BN)

Lim Ah Lek (simplified Chinese: 林亚礼; traditional Chinese: 林亞禮; Pe̍h-ōe-jī: Lîm A-lé) is a Malaysian Chinese Association (MCA) politician in Malaysia and was the Member of Parliament for Bentong constituency in Pahang and MCA deputy president.

== Career ==
In the 1995 Malaysian general election, Ah Lek defeated Democratic Action Party (Malaysia) candidate, Syed Ali Mohsin at P83 Bentong, Pahang. Subsequently, the Bentong area was represented by Liow Tiong Lai. In 1999, his name was dropped from the election candidate and was replaced by Liow Tiong Lai.

Ah Lek was elected as MCA deputy president in 1986, replacing Lee Kim Sai, while Ling Liong Sik became acting president and subsequently president. At that time MCA President Tan Koon Swan was imprisoned in Singapore following the Pan El scandal. At the MCA 2000 general meeting, Dr Ling had a tongue with Lim Ah Lek.

In 2001, AhLek was labelled as Team B opposing the political party to control the independence of Malaysia A Team Press team led by Ling Liong Sik. The Ah Lek and Liong Sik militants began after the 1999 elections, when Ah Lek wanted Chan Kong Choy to be full minister.

MCA has a strong influence on the Star and UMNO's influence on Utusan Malaysia and Berita Harian. Geng 8 in the MCA, namely Dato' Chua Jui Meng and Dato' Chan Kong Choy, led by Deputy President Dato' Lim Ah Lek, supported the establishment of the Chinese community for journalists to be given a vast space for freedom and criticism. Some people are trying to buy and control Nanyang Publication. MCA's investment company, Huaren Management Sdn. Bhd. buy Nanyang Press Holdings for RM230 million. Other leaders who oppose this sale and purchase agreement are, Youth Chief Datuk Ong Tee Keat and MCA Women's Deputy Chief Datin Paduka Dr. Tan Yee Kew. After Geng 8, Geng 10 was formed comprising Johor MCA Youth chief Hoo Seong Chan; Datuk Chong Toh Eng (Selangor), Lau Chek Tuan (Penang), Senator Yew Teong Look (Federal Territory), Datuk Soon Tian Szu (Melaka), Yip Chee Kiong (Negeri Sembilan), Tan Ken Ten (Kelantan), Toh Chin Yau (Terengganu) and Chew Kok Who (Sabah).

At the 2002 MCA general meeting, Liong Sik and Ah Lek remained one-year retirement until 2005 (2002–2005) for no election. All this is due to the intervention / peace plan proposed by Prime Minister Mahathir Mohamad to have no MCA election in 2002.

In 2004, Lim Ah Lek and Ling Liong Sik voluntarily retreated from MCA politics and were replaced by Ong Ka Ting and Tan Chan Kong Choy.

== Retired from politics ==
After his retirement from politics, Lim was appointed the chairman of Keretapi Tanah Melayu Berhad (KTMB) from 2007 to 2009.

Ah Lek was the previous the pro-chancellor of Universiti Putra Malaysia.

Ah Lek was appointed as a member of the Commission for Investigation and Improvement of Police. The commission is accompanied by Tun Mohamed Dzaiddin Abdullah (chairman); Tun Mohammed Hanif Omar (deputy chairman); Tun Salleh Abas; Tun Azizan Zainul Abidin; Tunku Abdul Aziz Tunku Ibrahim; Tan Lee Lam Thye; Datuk Kamilia Ibrahim; Tun Zaki Tun Azmi; Datuk Abdul Kadir Jasin, Datuk Michael Yeoh; Kuthubul Zaman Bukhari; Datuk Dr Muhammad Rais Abdul Karim; Denison Jayasooria; Ivy Josiah and Datin Paduka Zaleha Zahari.

In 2004, as MCA's former deputy president, he was annoyed with MCA president Chua Soi Lek who still wanted to politics and contest despite clear video CDs spread. As MCA veteran, many wanted him to resolve the crisis between Chua Soi Lek and Ong Tee Keat.

== Election results ==
Pahang State Legislative Assembly
| Year | Constituency | Candidate | Votes | Pct | Opponent(s) | Votes | Pct | Ballots cast | Majority | Turnout |
|---|---|---|---|---|---|---|---|---|---|---|
| 1982 | N13 Bandar Kuantan | Lim Ah Lek (MCA) | 10,128 | 69.00% | Lee Sit Yin (DAP) | 2,698 | 18.38% | 14,967 | 7,430 | 70.61% |
| 1982 | N13 Bandar Kuantan | Lim Ah Lek (MCA) | 10,128 | 69.00% | Tengku Ali Shahdan Tengku Endut (PAS) | 1,853 | 12.62% | 14,967 | 7,430 | 70.61% |
| 1986 | N14 Teruntum | Lim Ah Lek (MCA) | 9,698 | 63.80% | Syed Ali Mohsin (DAP) | 3,697 | 24.32% | 15,625 | 6,001 | 65.00% |
| 1986 | N14 Teruntum | Lim Ah Lek (MCA) | 9,698 | 63.80% | Othman Bakar (PAS) | 1,806 | 11.88% | 15,625 | 6,001 | 65.00% |

Parliament of Malaysia
| Year | Constituency | Candidate | Votes | Pct | Opponent(s) | Votes | Pct | Ballots cast | Majority | Turnout |
|---|---|---|---|---|---|---|---|---|---|---|
| 1989 | P079 Bentong | Lim Ah Lek (MCA) | 17,401 | 60.70% | Lip Tuck Chee (DAP) | 8,895 | 31.03% | 28,977 | 8,506 | 71.99% |
| 1989 | P079 Bentong | Lim Ah Lek (MCA) | 17,401 | 60.70% | Mohamed Basri Mahidin (IND) | 2,137 | 7.45% | 28,977 | 8,506 | 71.99% |
| 1989 | P079 Bentong | Lim Ah Lek (MCA) | 17,401 | 60.70% | M. Palanisamy (IND) | 193 | 0.67% | 28,977 | 8,506 | 71.99% |
| 1989 | P079 Bentong | Lim Ah Lek (MCA) | 17,401 | 60.70% | R. Appu (IND) | 42 | 0.15% | 28,977 | 8,506 | 71.99% |
| 1990 | P079 Bentong | Lim Ah Lek (MCA) | 22,486 | 68.43% | Woo Chee Wan (DAP) | 10,375 | 31.57% | 34,050 | 12,111 | 72.64% |
| 1995 | P083 Bentong | Lim Ah Lek (MCA) | 26,030 | 78.24% | Leong Chee Meng (DAP) | 7,241 | 21.76% | 35,563 | 18,789 | 72.38% |

== Honours ==
=== Honour of Malaysia ===
- Malaysia
  - Commander of the Order of Loyalty to the Crown of Malaysia (PSM) – Tan Sri (2004)
- Pahang
  - Knight Grand Companion of the Order of Sultan Ahmad Shah of Pahang (SSAP) – Dato' Sri (2002)
  - Knight Grand Companion of the Order of the Crown of Pahang (SIMP) – formerly Dato', now Dato' Indera (1989)
  - Knight Companion of the Order of Sultan Ahmad Shah of Pahang (DSAP) – Dato'
- Selangor
  - Knight Grand Companion of the Order of Sultan Sharafuddin Idris Shah (SSIS) – Dato' Setia (2018)
- Terengganu
  - Companion of the Order of the Crown of Terengganu (SMT)
