= Liow Tiong Lai =

Malaysian politician and nutritionist

Yang Berbahagia Tan Sri Dato' Seri Liow Tiong Lai PSM SPMP SSAP DGSM DIMP PKN
- 廖中莱
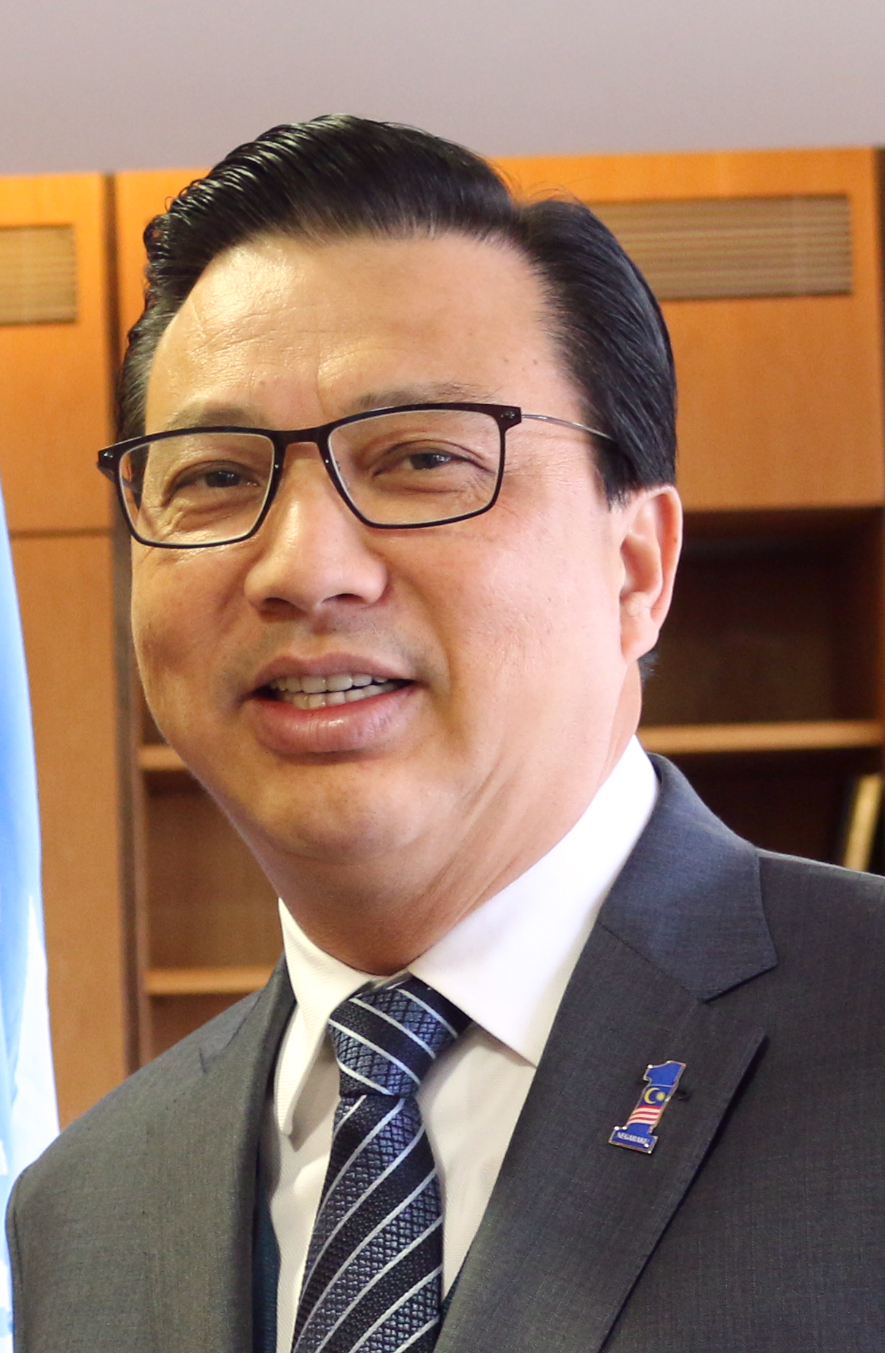
- Liow in 2017

Minister of Transport
- In office 27 June 2014 – 9 May 2018
- Monarchs: Abdul Halim; Muhammad V
- Prime Minister: Najib Razak
- Deputy: Aziz Kaprawi
- Preceded by: Hishammuddin Hussein (Acting)
- Succeeded by: Anthony Loke Siew Fook
- Constituency: Bentong

Minister of Health
- In office 19 March 2008 – 15 May 2013
- Monarchs: Mizan Zainal Abidin; Abdul Halim
- Prime Minister: Abdullah Ahmad Badawi; Najib Razak
- Deputy: Abdul Latiff Ahmad (2008–2009); Rosnah Abdul Rashid Shirlin (2009–2013)
- Preceded by: Ong Ka Ting (Acting)
- Succeeded by: Subramaniam Sathasivam
- Constituency: Bentong

Deputy Minister of Youth and Sports
- In office 14 February 2006 – 18 March 2008
- Monarchs: Sirajuddin; Mizan Zainal Abidin
- Prime Minister: Abdullah Ahmad Badawi
- Minister: Azalina Othman Said
- Preceded by: Ong Tee Keat
- Succeeded by: Wee Jeck Seng
- Constituency: Bentong

10th President of the Malaysian Chinese Association
- In office 21 December 2013 – 4 November 2018
- Deputy: Wee Ka Siong
- Preceded by: Chua Soi Lek
- Succeeded by: Wee Ka Siong
- Constituency: Bentong

Member of the Malaysian Parliament for Bentong
- In office 29 November 1999 – 9 May 2018
- Preceded by: Lim Ah Lek (BN–MCA)
- Succeeded by: Wong Tack (PH–DAP)
- Majority: 10,715 (1999); 16,839 (2004); 12,549 (2008); 379 (2013)

Personal details
- Born: Liow Tiong Lai; 13 October 1961 (age 64) Jasin, Malacca, Federation of Malaya (now Malaysia)
- Party: Malaysian Chinese Association (MCA) (since 1981)
- Other political affiliations: Barisan Nasional (BN) (since 1981)
- Spouse: Lee Sun Loo
- Children: 3
- Education: National University of Malaysia; University of Malaya
- Occupation: Politician; nutritionist
- Website: www.liowtionglai.com

Liow Tiong Lai (simplified Chinese: 廖中莱; traditional Chinese: 廖中萊; pinyin: Liào Zhōnglái; Pe̍h-ōe-jī: Liāu Tiong-lâi; born 13 October 1961) is a Malaysian politician and nutritionist who served as minister of transport, minister of health, deputy minister of youth and sports in the Barisan Nasional (BN) administration under former prime ministers Abdullah Ahmad Badawi and Najib Razak as well as former minister Azalina Othman Said from February 2006 to May 2018. He also served as the Member of Parliament (MP) for Bentong from November 1999 to May 2018. In addition, he served as 10th president of the Malaysian Chinese Association (MCA), a component party of the ruling BN coalition, from December 2013 to November 2018.

== Background ==
Born in Jasin, Malacca in 1961, Liow had ambitions of being a doctor but graduated with a Bachelor of Science (Nutrition) from Universiti Kebangsaan Malaysia (UKM) instead. He later obtained his MBA from the University of Malaya.

He is married to Puan Sri Lee Sun Loo and has three children. He is a strong advocate of healthy eating, especially eating organic food.

== Political career ==
Liow officially joined the Malaysian Chinese Association in 1981. Soon after graduating from Universiti Kebangsaan Malaysia in 1986, he joined MCA as a research assistant with a monthly salary of RM700. He became press secretary and later political secretary to MCA deputy president Lim Ah Lek from 1989 to 1999. After two decades of steady rise in the party, he was elected as MCA Youth Chief in 2005 and was elected as a vice-president in 2008.

Liow was first elected as Member of Parliament for Bentong in 1999. In 2006, he was appointed deputy minister of youth and sports in a Cabinet reshuffle. Following the 2008 general elections, Liow became minister of health under Prime Minister Abdullah Ahmad Badawi.

=== Call for second Deputy prime minister ===
In October 2008, Liow, who was the outgoing national youth chief of the MCA, raised the prospect of a second deputy chairman of Barisan Nasional to be appointed from among its component parties. The call was made at the MCA's internal party elections. As the deputy chairman of Barisan Nasional would be appointed deputy prime minister, it would mean creating a second deputy prime minister position. Observers felt that Liow's proposal was simply a gimmick for him to win the internal MCA party elections.

While MCA accepted UMNO's leadership of the Barisan Nasional coalition, MCA felt that its seniority in the coalition should be reflected through a second deputy chairman's position that would be filled by the MCA. Liow said, "MCA is the second largest component party. The proposed deputy president should be represented by the MCA."

Various MCA leaders backed Liow's proposal. Wee Ka Siong, the incoming MCA youth chief, said: "It (Barisan top leadership) must be well represented. We don’t want to see any kind of perception that Barisan is nominated by one or two parties. We don’t want to paint a picture where Barisan is dominated by one party and its decisions are accepted by the rest." Chan Kong Choy, MCA's deputy president, said: "The history in Barisan Nasional shows that there is no hard and fast rule that only the senior leaders of any party can automatically assume the positions in the coalition. Tun (then Tan Sri) Michael Chen (a former MCA deputy president) was the Barisan Nasional secretary-general in 1974."

In response to Liow's call, then Deputy Prime Minister Muhyiddin Yassin said, "The present Barisan setup is still workable. There is a history behind why the Barisan chairman is the Prime Minister and the deputy chairman is the Deputy Prime Minister and all the heads of the component parties become vice-chairmen. Since 1974 when Barisan was formed, it has been working very well. I don't think it is correct to say you cannot express your views because your post is only a vice-chairman. Sometimes you come and don't say anything at all, then even if you become deputy, it's useless."

Liow had planned to raise the issue at the Barisan Nasional level after the MCA had approved it. After winning his internal party elections, Liow, who had become the new MCA vice-president, said: "One step at a time. Let us reform Barisan first. We reform Barisan, (and only) then we will reform the government."

=== 2009 MCA crisis ===
From late 2009 to early 2010, Liow became embroiled in a leadership crisis in MCA, vocally opposing the "Greater Unity Plan", a temporary political alliance between the factions aligned to president Ong Tee Keat and deputy president Chua Soi Lek. Liow led a third faction pushing for new elections, but was unable to persuade two-thirds of the central committee to resign, which would have triggered an election under the party constitution.

The crisis came to a close after Chua resigned on 4 March 2010. The subsequent election saw Chua being elected president, while Liow defeated Kong Cho Ha in the contest for deputy president.

=== MCA presidency ===
In the 2013 general election, MCA suffered its worst electoral result in its history. Liow himself barely survived in his own parliamentary seat, winning by a majority of only 379 votes. MCA had previously passed a resolution not to take up cabinet posts in the government if it failed in the 13th general election. As a result of its poor performance, Chua announced that MCA would not take up its allotted cabinet posts, and Liow therefore was not appointed to a cabinet position.

In the following party poll for the presidency, Chua did not enter the contest, and Liow defeated Ong Tee Keat and Gan Ping Sieu, and was thus elected President of MCA on 21 December 2013. Shortly after Liow was elected, the MCA convened an extraordinary meeting to reverse several resolutions, including the resolution that stipulated that MCA members should not serve in federal and state governments.

The cabinet was reshuffled on 25 June 2014, and Liow was appointed minister of transport in the aftermath of the MH370 incident. He was sworn in as minister of transport by Yang Di-Pertuan Agong on 27 June 2014.

In the aftermath of MCA's poor showing and Barisan Nasional's defeat in the 2018 general election, Liow announced that he will not stand for re-election in the next party elections. He is eventually succeeded by Wee Ka Siong.

== In popular culture ==
In 2009, Liow made a special appearance playing himself in a short film "Healthy Paranoia" of the 15Malaysia project commemorating Malaysia's independence.

In a six-minute-long short video released in conjunction with the 2017 National Day celebrations entitled "Citizens" (Chinese: 国民), co-written and co-directed by Pete Teo and Liew Seng Tat, Liow played double roles as a minister and a citizen conversing to each other on the spirit of nation building.

== Election results ==
Parliament of Malaysia
Year	Constituency	Candidate	Votes	Pct	Opponent(s)	Votes	Pct	Ballots cast	Majority	Turnout
1999	P083 Bentong	Liow Tiong Lai (MCA)	23,104	63.92%	Abdul Wahab Sudin (KeADILan)	12,389	34.27%	36,996	10,715	72.59%
2004	P089 Bentong	Liow Tiong Lai (MCA)	27,144	72.02%	Abu Bakar Lebai Sudin (DAP)	10,305	27.34%	38,689	16,839	73.46%
2008	P089 Bentong	Liow Tiong Lai (MCA)	25,134	66.35%	Ponusamy Govindasamy (PKR)	12,585	33.22%	39,168	12,549	73.01%
2013	P089 Bentong	Liow Tiong Lai (MCA)	25,947	50.25%	Wong Tack (DAP)	25,568	49.51%	52,627	379	84.52%
2018	P089 Bentong	Liow Tiong Lai (MCA)	23,684	42.98%	Wong Tack (DAP)	25,716	46.67%	55,106	2,032	83.40%
2018	P089 Bentong	Liow Tiong Lai (MCA)	23,684	42.98%	Balasubramaniam Nachiapan (PAS)	5,706	10.35%	55,106	2,032	83.40%
2022	P089 Bentong	Liow Tiong Lai (MCA)	24,383	36.58%	Young Syefura Othman (DAP)	25,075	37.62%	66,657	692	76.57%
2022	P089 Bentong	Liow Tiong Lai (MCA)	24,383	36.58%	Roslan Hassan (BERSATU)	16,233	24.35%	66,657	692	76.57%
2022	P089 Bentong	Liow Tiong Lai (MCA)	24,383	36.58%	Wong Tack (IND)	798	1.20%	66,657	692	76.57%
2022	P089 Bentong	Liow Tiong Lai (MCA)	24,383	36.58%	Mohd Khalil Abdul Hamid (IND)	168	0.25%	66,657	692	76.57%

== Honours ==
=== Honours of Malaysia ===
- Malaysia
  - Commander of the Order of Loyalty to the Crown of Malaysia (PSM) – Tan Sri (2021)
  - Recipient of the National Sovereignty Medal (PKN) (2014)
- Malacca
  - Grand Commander of the Exalted Order of Malacca (DGSM) – Datuk Seri (2009)
- Pahang
  - Knight Grand Companion of the Order of Sultan Ahmad Shah of Pahang (SSAP) – Dato' Sri (2008)
  - Knight Companion of the Order of the Crown of Pahang (DIMP) – Dato' (2004)
- Perlis
  - Knight Grand Commander of the Order of the Crown of Perlis (SPMP) – Dato' Seri (2011)

Political offices
Preceded by Chua Soi Lek	Malaysian Chinese Association (MCA) President; 21 December 2013 – 4 November 2018	Succeeded by Wee Ka Siong
