= Lynas =

Australian rare-earths mining company

Lynas Rare Earths Ltd
- Type: Public ASX: LYC
- Industry: Mining
- Predecessor: Yilgangi Gold NL, Lynas Gold N.L
- Founded: 1983; 43 years ago
- Founder: Zlatko Sumich
- Headquarters: Sydney, Australia; Kuantan, Malaysia
- Area served: Australia, Malaysia, Singapore
- Key people: Pol Le Roux (interim CEO)
- Products: rare-earth metals
- Revenue: 363,500,000 Australian dollar (2019)
- Website: www.lynascorp.com

Lynas Rare Earths, Ltd. is an Australian rare-earths mining company with two major operations: a mining and concentration plant at Mount Weld in Western Australia, and the Lynas Advanced Materials Plant (LAMP) in Kuantan, Malaysia. The company was founded in the 1990s and is headquartered in Perth, Western Australia.

The project produces radioactive waste, and has met with resistance from local communities.

Lynas is listed on the Australian Securities Exchange as a S&P/ASX 200 company.

== Background ==
Rare earth elements are critical minerals used in the defense industry and for electronics. China controls 80% of global rare earth production. The Lynas Advanced Materials Plant is the largest rare earth production facility outside of China.

== History ==
The company was founded in 1983 as Yilgangi Gold NL. The company took on the Lynas Gold N.L. name in 1985.^{[1]} It became publicly listed in 1986 on the ASX. In 2001, it sold off its gold division and focused on rare earths.^{[1]}

Lynas was founded by the Sumich family of Perth, Western Australia. Perth based mining identity, Mr Les Emery was appointed its first CEO and Managing Director in 1986, remaining with Lynas until 2001.

In 1994, following an exploration discovery, Lynas opened its first gold mine at Lynas Find, 130 km south of Port Hedland, Western Australia. In 1998 it jointly developed a second gold mine at Paraburdoo, in the Ashburton region of Western Australia, with Sipa Resources.

In 2000 Les Emery identified an opportunity to diversify Lynas into the rare earths industry, when he became aware that Ashton Mining was attempting to sell off the Mount Weld rare earths project. He concluded an agreement for Lynas to purchase the project and in 2001 Lynas changed its name to Lynas Corporation Limited. Later in the same year Les Emery was replaced as CEO and Managing Director by Sydney based Nicholas Curtis.

Amanda Lacaze retired as chief executive on 30 June 2026 after 12 years in the role, and chief operating officer Pol Le Roux became interim chief executive on 1 July while the board continued its search for a permanent successor.

== Operations ==
=== Mount Weld ===
In May 2009, Lynas was offered funding of $252 million by the Chinese state-owned China Non-Ferrous Metal Mining (Group) Co., which would have taken a 51.6% stake in the company. However the deal was scrapped by Australia's Foreign Investment Review Board on concern it would threaten supply to non-Chinese buyers. Lynas later raised $450 million in a share sale.

In November 2010, it signed an agreement with the Japanese rare-earths trading company Sojitz to export €450 million Euros worth of rare-earth minerals from its mine in Mount Weld.

==== Crown deposit ====
In April 2011, Lynas was attempting to sell its Crown polymetallic deposit (which is particularly prospective for niobium) at Mount Weld to Forge Resources. Forge, a company listed on the ASX, also shared the one common Director and CEO of Lynas, Nicholas Curtis, (Lynas current CEO is Amanda Lacaze) although former Lynas executive director Harry Wang was also involved with Forge and the transaction. In a 2007 Company presentation, Lynas claimed that the Crown deposit was worth $50 billion but have valued it at $20.7 million for sale to Forge. Curtis as a director of Forge would receive a 24,000,000 performance shares if the deal between Lynas and Forge proceeds. Certain commentators and journalists have called into question the regulatory oversight of the Australian Securities & Investments Commission (ASIC) as to the legality of such a proposal, but were proven to have been uninformed or alarmist because the proposal was always subject to the approval of independent shareholders at an Extraordinary General Meeting (EGM). The EGM was cancelled by Lynas after shareholder opposition to the proposal became apparent, and the Crown polymetallic deposit remains owned by Lynas.

=== Lynas Advanced Materials Plant ===
The Lynas Advance Materials Plant (LAMP) near Kuantan, in the Malaysian state of Pahang is the world's largest rare earth extraction plant outside of China. The $800 million plant began operations in 2012. The plant produces radioactive waste.

On 5 September 2012, Lynas was awarded a temporary 2-year operating licence by Malaysia's Atomic Energy Licensing Board despite concerns about lack of a long term disposal plan for its waste. By February 2023, the plant had produced over one million metric tons of radioactive waste.

==== Community opposition ====
Kuantan MP Fuziah Salleh raised concerns about risks from the plant in the Parliament of Malaysia since 2008. A civil society group "Concerned Citizens of Kuantan" was formed in December 2008 to voice concerns about the plant.

In early March 2011, an article published in the New York Times raised the public awareness concerning the LAMP. Community opposition evolved into a bigger group called Save Malaysia Stop Lynas (SMSL) under the leadership of Bentong MP Wong Tack.

An Australian Greens MP, Robin Chapple, denied Lynas Corp's attempt to ship radioactive waste from Malaysia back to Western Australia saying that the Western Australia Nuclear Waste Storage (Prohibition) Act 1999 forbids the import of radioactive waste.

On 19 December 2012, the Malaysian Court of Appeal dismissed an appeal by SMSL against a temporary operating licence granted to Lynas, with costs in favour of Lynas.

The refining facility entered production in 2013, producing 1,089 tonnes of rare-earth oxides in the first quarter of 2014, with a target of 11,000 tonnes per annum. On 2 September 2014, Lynas was issued a 2-year Full Operating Stage License (FOSL) by the Malaysian Atomic Energy Licensing Board (AELB)

In September 2018, the newly elected Pakatan Harapan government called for a thorough review of the Lynas plant. Fuziah Salleh was appointed as the chairwoman of the evaluation committee, and promised a fair review, saying that she will "look out for the best interest of Kuantan residents"

==== Permitting ====
In 2020, LAMP received a 3-year operating licence. The permit required Lynas to move their cracking and leaching facilities outside of Malaysia before July 2023, to stop importing radioactive material, and come up with a permanent disposal plan for wastes. On 30 December 2021, Lynas announced it had secured environmental approvals from Malaysian authorities to build a permanent disposal facility for water leached purification residue at Gebeng industrial estate.

In February 2023, the Malaysian government required Lynas to stop operating the cracking and leaching portion of the plant, because they were still generating radioactive waste. They also renewed permitting for other activities for an additional 3 years.

== See also ==
- MP Materials
