= Woo Chee Wan =

Malaysian politician

Yang Berhormat Tuan Woo Chee Wan MLA
- 胡智云

Member of the Pahang State Legislative Assembly for Mentakab
- Incumbent
- Assumed office 9 May 2018
- Preceded by: Tengku Zulpuri Shah Raja Puji (PR–DAP)
- Majority: 5,829 (2018); 3,657 (2022)

Personal details
- Born: Woo Chee Wan; 24 October 1959 (age 66) Pahang, Federation of Malaya (now Malaysia)
- Citizenship: Malaysian
- Party: Democratic Action Party (DAP)
- Other political affiliations: Gagasan Rakyat (GR) (1990–1995); Barisan Alternatif (BA) (1999–2004); Pakatan Rakyat (PR) (2008–2015); Pakatan Harapan (PH) (since 2015)
- Occupation: Politician

Woo Chee Wan

Chinese name
- Traditional Chinese: 胡智雲
- Simplified Chinese: 胡智云
Transcriptions
Standard Mandarin
- Hanyu Pinyin: Hú Zhìyún

Woo Chee Wan (simplified Chinese: 胡智云; traditional Chinese: 胡智雲; pinyin: Hú Zhìyún; born 24 October 1959) is a Malaysian politician who has served as Member of the Pahang State Legislative Assembly (MLA) for Mentakab since May 2018. He is a member of the Democratic Action Party (DAP), a component party of the Pakatan Harapan (PH) and formerly the Pakatan Rakyat (PR), Barisan Alternatif (BA) and Gagasan Rakyat (GR) coalitions. He is the State Vice Chairman of the DAP of Pahang.

== Election results ==
Parliament of Malaysia
Year	Constituency	Candidate	Votes	Pct	Opponent(s)	Votes	Pct	Ballots cast	Majority	Turnout
1986	P072 Lipis	Woo Chee Wan (DAP)	3,773	16.85%	Wang Choon Wing (MCA)	13,533	60.45%	23,293	8,452	65.83%
1986	P072 Lipis	Woo Chee Wan (DAP)	3,773	16.85%	Solahuddin Mohd Ali (PAS)	5,081	22.70%	23,293	8,452	65.83%
1990	P079 Bentong	Woo Chee Wan (DAP)	10,375	31.57%	Lim Ah Lek (MCA)	22,486	68.43%	34,050	12,111	72.64%

Pahang State Legislative Assembly
Year	Constituency	Candidate	Votes	Pct	Opponent(s)	Votes	Pct	Ballots cast	Majority	Turnout
1999	N30 Sabai	Woo Chee Wan (DAP)	2,658	41.49%	Davendran Murthy (MIC)	3,748	58.51%	6,613	1,090	70.08%
2004	N10 Damak	Woo Chee Wan (DAP)	5,324	41.31%	Lau Lee (MCA)	7,563	58.69%	13,548	2,239	73.74%
2018	N30 Mentakab	Woo Chee Wan (DAP)	10,547	50.78%	Abirerah Awang Chik (PAS)	4,718	22.71%	20,771	5,829	81.68%
2018	N30 Mentakab	Woo Chee Wan (DAP)	10,547	50.78%	Wong Tat Chee (MCA)	4,548	21.90%	20,771	5,829	81.68%
2018	N30 Mentakab	Woo Chee Wan (DAP)	10,547	50.78%	Chuah Boon Seong (IND)	958	4.61%	20,771	5,829	81.68%
2022	N30 Mentakab	Woo Chee Wan (DAP)	12,905	44.97%	Mohd Yusoff Abdullah (BERSATU)	9,248	32.22%	28,962	3,657	76.97%
2022	N30 Mentakab	Woo Chee Wan (DAP)	12,905	44.97%	Wong Tze Shiang (MCA)	5,996	20.89%	28,962	3,657	76.97%
2022	N30 Mentakab	Woo Chee Wan (DAP)	12,905	44.97%	Abdul Wahab Kadir (PEJUANG)	287	1.00%	28,962	3,657	76.97%
