= Pang Hok Liong =

Malaysian politician and lawyer

Yang Berhormat Tuan Pang Hok Liong MP
- 彭学良

Member of the Malaysian Parliament for Labis
- Incumbent
- Assumed office 9 May 2018
- Preceded by: Chua Tee Yong (BN–MCA)
- Majority: 3,408 (2018); 2,833 (2022)

Member of the Johor State Legislative Assembly for Bekok
- In office 21 October 1990 – 25 April 1995
- Preceded by: Tay Boon Chong (BN–MCA)
- Succeeded by: Tan Kok Hong (BN–MCA)
- Majority: 290 (1990)

Personal details
- Born: Pang Hok Liong; 22 July 1957 (age 69) Labis, Segamat District, Johor, Federation of Malaya (now Malaysia)
- Citizenship: Malaysian
- Party: Democratic Action Party (DAP) (since 1988)
- Other political affiliations: Gagasan Rakyat (GR) (1990–1996); Barisan Alternatif (BA) (1999–2004); Pakatan Rakyat (PR) (2008–2015); Pakatan Harapan (PH) (since 2015)
- Education: London University; Lincoln's Inn
- Occupation: Politician
- Profession: Lawyer
- Pang Hok Liong on Facebook; Pang Hok Liong on Parliament of Malaysia

Pang Hok Liong (Note: Simplified Chinese: 彭学良; Traditional Chinese: 彭學良; Pinyin: Péng Xuéliáng; Jyutping: Paang4 Hok6 Loeng4; Pe̍h-ōe-jī: Phêⁿ Ha̍k-liông) (born 22 July 1957) is a Malaysian politician and lawyer who has served the Member of Parliament (MP) for Labis since May 2018. He served as the Member of the Johor State Legislative Assembly (MLA) for Bekok from October 1990 to April 1995. He is a member of the Democratic Action Party (DAP), a component party of the Pakatan Harapan (PH) and formerly Pakatan Rakyat (PR) coalitions.

== Background ==
Pang born on 22 July 1957 at Labis, Segamat, Johor. He obtained his Masters of Law (LLM) from University College London and Barrister-At-Law of Lincoln's Inn, London. He is an Advocate and Solicitor of the High Courts of Malaya and practicing lawyer since 19 August 1986 currently practicing in C C Aiyathurai & Co., Segamat.

== Politics ==
Pang previously contested for the Segamat seat in 2004 and 2008 general elections but had lost both the contests to Subramaniam Sathasivam from Malaysian Indian Congress (MIC) of Barisan Nasional (BN). He did not participate in the 2013 general elections.

In the 2018 general election, Pang was finally elected to the MP for the Labis constituency, winning 16,977 of the 32,578 votes cast. He created history for winning the traditional Malaysian Chinese Association (MCA)-BN stronghold for the first time by defeating the Deputy Minister of International Trade and Industry then, Chua Tee Yong.

== Incident ==
On 20 June 1991, during the opening ceremony of the Johor State Legislative Assembly at Dewan Tun Abdul Razak of the Sultan Ibrahim Building, the Sultan of Johor, Sultan Iskandar, punched and slapped Pang Hok Liong and Wong Peng Seng, who were both DAP members and Johor state assemblymen at the time. This was soon followed by another assault from the then-Crown Prince of Johor, Ibrahim Iskandar (now Sultan of Johor and the 17th Yang di-Pertuan Agong), who kicked Pang in his legs.

The incident was confirmed by the DAP central committee but no police report was ever made. It only came to public light during the 1993 constitutional crisis when the MP for Arau, Shahidan Kassim, listed out the alleged past crimes committed by the Johor royal family in the Parliament session on 19 January 1993, which was in the midst of debating the constitutional amendment bill to remove royal immunity.

== Election results ==
Johor State Legislative Assembly
Year	Constituency	Candidate	Votes	Pct	Opponent(s)	Votes	Pct	Ballots cast	Majority	Turnout
1990	N08 Bekok	Pang Hok Liong (DAP)	7,638	49.27%	Lim Si Cheng (MCA)	7,348	47.40%	15,502	290	70.43%
1995	N08 Bekok	Pang Hok Liong (DAP)	6,422	36.15%	Tan Kok Hong (MCA)	10,850	61.08%	17,763	4,428	71.46%
1999	N16 Maharani	Pang Hok Liong (DAP)	9,413	42.03%	Lau Yew Wee (MCA)	12,225	54.59%	22,394	2,812	72.30%
2004	N02 Jementah	Pang Hok Liong (DAP)	6,449	35.84%	Lee Hong Tee (MCA)	11,174	62.10%	17,993	4,725	70.00%
2008	N02 Jementah	Pang Hok Liong (DAP)	8,098	43.93%	Lee Hong Tee (MCA)	9,912	53.77%	18,434	1,814	73.00%

Parliament of Malaysia
Year	Constituency	Candidate	Votes	Pct	Opponent(s)	Votes	Pct	Ballots cast	Majority	Turnout
2004	P140 Segamat	Pang Hok Liong (DAP)	10,144	35.01%	Subramaniam Sathasivam (MIC)	17,953	61.96%	28,974	7,809	70.70%
2008	P140 Segamat	Pang Hok Liong (DAP)	12,930	43.54%	Subramaniam Sathasivam (MIC)	15,921	53.61%	29,699	2,991	72.96%
2018	P142 Labis	Pang Hok Liong (DAP)	16,709	52.17%	Chua Tee Yong (MCA)	13,301	41.53%	32,030	3,408	80.76%
2018	P142 Labis	Pang Hok Liong (DAP)	16,709	52.17%	Abd Hamid Abdullah (PAS)	2,020	6.31%	32,030	3,408	80.76%
2022	P142 Labis	Pang Hok Liong (DAP)	16,133	46.43%	Chua Tee Yong (MCA)	13,300	38.28%	34,475	2,833	69.70%
2022	P142 Labis	Pang Hok Liong (DAP)	16,133	46.43%	Alvin Chang Teck Kiam (BERSATU)	5,312	15.29%	34,475	2,833	69.70%

== Honours ==
=== Honours of Malaysia ===
- Malaysia
  - Recipient of the 17th Yang di-Pertuan Agong Installation Medal (2024)

== Note ==
Parliament of Malaysia
Preceded by Chua Tee Yong	Member of Parliament for Labis; 9 May 2018–present	Incumbent
