= Ramakrishnan Suppiah =

Malaysian politician

- ராமகிருஷ்ணன் சுப்பையா

Member of the Johor State Executive Council (Consumerism, Human Resources and Unity : 16 May 2018 – 21 April 2019 & Unity, Domestic Trade and Consumer Affairs : 22 April 2019 – 28 February 2020)
- In office 16 May 2018 – 27 February 2020
- Monarch: Ibrahim Iskandar
- Menteri Besar: Osman Sapian (2018–2019); Sahruddin Jamal (2019–2020)
- Preceded by: Tee Siew Kiong (Consumerism); Vidyananthan Ramanadhan (Human Resources and Unity)
- Succeeded by: Chong Fat Full
- Constituency: Bekok

Member of the Johor State Legislative Assembly for Bekok
- In office 9 May 2018 – 12 March 2022
- Preceded by: Lim Eng Guan (PH–DAP)
- Succeeded by: Tan Chong (BN–MCA)
- Majority: 2,457 (2018)

Personal details
- Born: Ramakrishnan a/l Suppiah; 25 March 1956 (age 70) Johor, Federation of Malaya (now Malaysia)
- Citizenship: Malaysian
- Party: Democratic Action Party (DAP)
- Other political affiliations: Pakatan Harapan (PH)
- Occupation: Politician

Ramakrishnan a/l Suppiah (born 25 March 1956) is a Malaysian politician who served as Member of the Johor State Executive Council (EXCO) in the Pakatan Harapan (PH) state administration under former Menteris Besar Osman Sapian and Sahruddin Jamal from May 2018 to the collapse of the PH state administration in February 2020 and Member of the Johor State Legislative Assembly (MLA) for Bekok from May 2018 to March 2022. He is a member of the Democratic Action Party (DAP), a component party of the PH coalition.

== Election results ==
Parliament of Malaysia
Year	Constituency	Candidate	Votes	Pct	Opponent(s)	Votes	Pct	Ballots cast	Majority	Turnout
2013	P142 Labis	Ramakrishnan Suppiah (DAP)	15,468	49.44%	Chua Tee Yong (MCA)	15,821	50.56%	31,978	353	84.90%

Johor State Legislative Assembly
Year	Constituency	Candidate	Votes	Pct	Opponent(s)	Votes	Pct	Ballots cast	Majority	Turnout
2018	N06 Bekok	Ramakrishnan Suppiah (DAP)	9,705	57.26%	Tan Chong (MCA)	7,245	42.74%	17,325	2,457	78.90%
