= Bekok (state constituency) =

Political subdivision in Malaysia

Bekok (N06)
Johor constituency

State constituency
- Legislature: Johor State Legislative Assembly
MLA
Tan Chong
BN
- Constituency created: 1959
- First contested: 1959
- Last contested: 2026

Demographics
- Population (2020): 21,928
- Electors (2026): 27,317
- Area (km²): 1,068

Bekok is a state constituency in Johor, Malaysia, that is represented in the Johor State Legislative Assembly.

The state constituency was first contested in 1959 and is mandated to return a single Assemblyman to the Johor State Legislative Assembly under the first-past-the-post voting system.

== Demographics ==
As of 2020, Bekok has a population of 21,928 people.

Ethnic breakdown of Bekok's electorate as of 2026
1. Chinese (47.4%)
2. Malay (30.0%)
3. Indian (18.7%)
4. Other ethnicities (4.10%)

== History ==
=== Polling districts ===
According to the gazette issued on 2 July 2026, the Bekok constituency has a total of 22 polling districts.

State constituency	Polling Districts	Code	Location
Bekok (N06)	Bandar Labis Selatan	142/06/01	SK Labis
Bekok (N06)	Bandar Labis Barat	142/06/02	SMK Munshi Ibrahim
Bekok (N06)	Sungai Karas	142/06/03	SJK (C) Karas
Bekok (N06)	Kampong Panchajaya	142/06/04	Balai Raya Kampung Panchajaya
Bekok (N06)	Kampong Kudong	142/06/05	SK Kampung Kudong
Bekok (N06)	Ladang Kempas	142/06/06	Pusat Jagaan Kanak-Kanak Ladang Gunung Mas (Div)
Bekok (N06)	Kampong Bahru Bekok Barat	142/06/07	SMK Bekok
Bekok (N06)	Kampong Bahru Bekok Tengah	142/06/08	SJK (C) Bekok
Bekok (N06)	Kampong Bahru Bekok Timor	142/06/09	SK Seri Bekok
Bekok (N06)	Bandar Bekok	142/06/10	SJK (T) Bekok
Bekok (N06)	Ladang Getah Eldred Bekok	142/06/11	Dewan Orang Ramai Ladang Eldred
Bekok (N06)	Johor Labis 'A'	142/06/12	Balai Raya Claire 1 Ladang Claire Chaah
Bekok (N06)	Chaah Barat	142/06/13	SMK Chaah
Bekok (N06)	Bandar Chaah Utara	142/06/14	SJK (T) Cantuman Chaah
Bekok (N06)	Bandar Chaah Tengah	142/06/15	SJK (C) Chaah
Bekok (N06)	Bandar Chaah Selatan	142/06/16	SA Chaah
Bekok (N06)	Kampong Jawa Chaah	142/06/17	SK Seri Bali
Bekok (N06)	Chaah Timor	142/06/18	SJK (T) Cantuman Chaah
Bekok (N06)	Chan Wing	142/06/19	Dewan Orang Ramai Ladang Gunung Mas
Bekok (N06)	Ladang Gerchang	142/06/20	Balai Raya Ladang Sungai Gerchang Bahagian 2
Bekok (N06)	Desa Temu Jodoh	142/06/21	SK Desa Temu Jodoh
Bekok (N06)	Perling	142/06/22	SK Seri Labis

=== Representation history ===
Members of the Legislative Assembly for Bekok
Assembly	No	Years	Name	Party
Constituency created
1st	N04	1959-1964	Phang Voon Liat (彭文烈)	Independent
2nd	N04	1964-1969	Sim Kim Chong @ Siew Ah See (沈金松)	Alliance (MCA)
		1969-1971	Assembly dissolved	
3rd	N04	1969-1971	Sim Kim Chong @ Siew Ah See (沈金松)	Alliance (MCA)
3rd	N04	1971-1974	Ng Nam Seng (吳南生)	Alliance (MCA)
4th	N05	1974-1978	Ng Nam Seng (吳南生)	BN (MCA)
5th	N05	1978-1982	Ng Nam Seng (吳南生)	BN (MCA)
6th	N05	1982-1986	Siaw Siew Bee (蕭修美)	BN (MCA)
7th	N08	1986-1990	Tay Boon Chong (鄭文忠)	BN (MCA)
8th	N08	1990-1995	Pang Hok Liong (彭學良)	DAP
9th	N08	1995-1999	Tan Kok Hong @ Tan Yi (陳國煌)	BN (MCA)
10th	N08	1999-2004	Tan Kok Hong @ Tan Yi (陳國煌)	BN (MCA)
11th	N06	2004-2008	Tan Kok Hong @ Tan Yi (陳國煌)	BN (MCA)
12th	N06	2008-2013	Tan Kok Hong @ Tan Yi (陳國煌)	BN (MCA)
13th	N06	2013-2018	Lim Eng Guan (林永源)	PR (DAP)
14th	N06	2018-2022	Ramakrishnan Suppiah (ராமகிருஷ்ணன் சுப்பையா)	PH (DAP)
15th	N06	2022–2026	Tan Chong (陳宗)	BN (MCA)
16th	N06	2026-present	Tan Chong (陳宗)	BN (MCA)

== Election results ==
Johor state election, 2026
Party	Candidate	Votes	%	∆%
BN	Tan Chong	10,230	63.16	▲11.85
PH	Tay Yok Jiuen	5,967	36.84	▲11.56
Total valid votes		16,197	100.00	
Total rejected ballots		266		
Unreturned ballots		23		
Turnout		16,486	60.35	▲9.05
Registered electors		27,317		
Majority		4,263	26.32	▲0.30
BN hold		Swing		

Johor state election, 2022
Party	Candidate	Votes	%	∆%
BN	Tan Chong	7,036	51.31	▲8.57
PH	Kanan Muruppiah	3,467	25.28	▲25.28
PN	Tan Lek Khang	2,881	21.01	▲21.01
Heritage	Sandara Segaran Arumugam	330	2.40	▲2.40
Total valid votes		13,714	100.00	
Total rejected ballots		271		
Unreturned ballots		86		
Turnout		14,071	51.31	▼30.11
Registered electors		27,426		
Majority		3,569	26.03	▲11.92
BN gain from PKR		Swing		?

Johor state election, 2018
Party	Candidate	Votes	%	∆%
PKR	Ramakrishnan Suppiah	9,983	57.06	▲57.06
BN	Tan Chong	7,514	42.94	▼2.96
Total valid votes		17,497	100.00	
Total rejected ballots		333		
Unreturned ballots		48		
Turnout		17,878	81.42	▼2.38
Registered electors		21,958		
Majority		2,469	14.11	▲5.91
PKR hold		Swing		

Johor state election, 2013
Party	Candidate	Votes	%	∆%
DAP	Lim Eng Guan	9,243	54.10	▲11.53
BN	Tan Chong	7,842	45.90	▼11.53
Total valid votes		17,085	100.00	
Total rejected ballots		298		
Unreturned ballots		25		
Turnout		17,408	83.80	▲13.05
Registered electors		20,774		
Majority		1,401	8.20	▼6.67
DAP gain from BN		Swing		-

Johor state election, 2008
Party	Candidate	Votes	%	∆%
BN	Tan Kok Hong	7,510	57.43	▼18.30
DAP	Chang Teck Chee	5,566	42.57	▲18.30
Total valid votes		13,076	100.00	
Total rejected ballots		304		
Unreturned ballots		32		
Turnout		13,412	70.75	▲0.58
Registered electors		18,957		
Majority		1,944	14.87	▼36.61
BN hold		Swing		

Johor state election, 2004
Party	Candidate	Votes	%	∆%
BN	Tan Kok Hong	9,521	75.74	▲8.36
DAP	Ahmad Ton	3,050	24.26	▼8.36
Total valid votes		12,571	100.00	
Total rejected ballots		306		
Unreturned ballots		14		
Turnout		12,891	70.17	▲1.32
Registered electors		18,372		
Majority		6,471	51.48	▲16.72
BN hold		Swing		

Johor state election, 1999
Party	Candidate	Votes	%	∆%
BN	Tan Kok Hong	11,213	67.38	▲4.56
DAP	John Ong Ching Ping	5,429	32.62	▼4.56
Total valid votes		16,642	100.00	
Total rejected ballots		505		
Unreturned ballots		30		
Turnout		17,177	68.85	▼2.61
Registered electors		24,948		
Majority		5,784	34.76	▲9.12
BN hold		Swing		

Johor state election, 1995
Party	Candidate	Votes	%	∆%
BN	Tan Kok Hong	10,850	62.82	▲13.79
DAP	Pang Hok Liong	6,422	37.18	▼13.79
Total valid votes		17,272	100.00	
Total rejected ballots		467		
Unreturned ballots		24		
Turnout		17,763	71.46	▲0.99
Registered electors		24,857		
Majority		4,428	25.64	▲23.70
BN gain from DAP		Swing		-

Johor state election, 1990
Party	Candidate	Votes	%	∆%
DAP	Pang Hok Liong	7,638	50.97	▲6.11
BN	Lim Si Cheng	7,348	49.03	▼4.19
Total valid votes		14,986	100.00	
Total rejected ballots		516		
Unreturned ballots		9		
Turnout		15,511	70.47	▼0.65
Registered electors		22,012		
Majority		290	1.94	▼6.43
DAP gain from BN		Swing		-

Johor state election, 1986
Party	Candidate	Votes	%	∆%
BN	Tay Boon Chong	7,610	53.22	▼10.21
DAP	Lim Wah Kin	6,414	44.86	▲9.48
PAS	Mohd. Saat bin Mohamad	274	1.92	▲0.97
Total valid votes		14,298	100.00	
Total rejected ballots		477		
Unreturned ballots		0		
Turnout		14,775	71.11	▼4.80
Registered electors		20,777		
Majority		1,196	8.36	▼19.69
BN hold		Swing		

Johor state election, 1982
Party	Candidate	Votes	%	∆%
BN	Siaw Siew Bee	8,618	63.43	▲6.13
DAP	Lim Kwi Siam	4,806	35.37	▼5.35
PAS	Abu Bakar Baharudin	129	0.95	▼1.02
Independent	Mo Min K. Kutty Ali	33	0.24	▲0.24
Total valid votes		13,586	100.00	
Total rejected ballots		520		
Unreturned ballots		0		
Turnout		14,106	75.91	▼1.83
Registered electors		18,583		
Majority		3,812	28.06	▲11.49
BN hold		Swing		

Johor state election, 1978
Party	Candidate	Votes	%	∆%
BN	Ng Nam Seng	6,504	57.30	
DAP	Tan Kim Yuan	4,623	40.73	
PAS	Abu Bakar Kathom	224	1.97	
Total valid votes		11,351	100.00	
Total rejected ballots		556		
Unreturned ballots		0		
Turnout		11,907	77.74	▲77.74
Registered electors		15,317		
Majority		1,881	16.57	▲16.57
BN hold		Swing		

Johor state election, 1974
Party	Candidate	Votes	%	∆%
On the nomination day, Ng Nam Seng won uncontested.
BN	Ng Nam Seng			
Total valid votes				
Total rejected ballots				
Unreturned ballots				
Turnout				
Registered electors		13,080		
Majority				
BN gain from Alliance		Swing		-

Johor state by-election, 15 May 1971 Upon the death of the incumbent, Sim Kim Chong
Party	Candidate	Votes	%	∆%
Alliance	Ng Nam Seng	5,219	58.73	▲4.34
DAP	Chian Heng Kai	3,667	41.27	▲41.27
Total valid votes		8,886	100.00	
Total rejected ballots		137		
Unreturned ballots		0		
Turnout		9,023	65.68	▼4.69
Registered electors		13,737		
Majority		1,552	17.47	▲8.67
Alliance hold		Swing		

Johor state election, 1969
Party	Candidate	Votes	%	∆%
Alliance	Sim Kim Chong	4,826	54.40	▼5.22
Independent	Tee (Bong Hing)	4,046	45.60	▲45.60
Total valid votes		8,872	100.00	
Total rejected ballots		805		
Unreturned ballots		0		
Turnout		9,677	70.38	▼11.56
Registered electors		13,750		
Majority		780	8.79	▼28.53
Alliance hold		Swing		

Johor state election, 1964
Party	Candidate	Votes	%	∆%
Alliance	Sim Kim Chong	5,280	59.62	▲11.00
Socialist Front	Soi Beng	1,975	22.30	▲22.30
UDP	Phang Voon Liat	1,601	18.08	▲18.08
Total valid votes		8,856	100.00	
Total rejected ballots		474		
Unreturned ballots		0		
Turnout		9,330	81.94	▲3.26
Registered electors		11,387		
Majority		3,305	37.32	▲34.57
Alliance gain from Independent		Swing		-

Johor state election, 1959
Party	Candidate	Votes	%
Independent	Phang Voon Liat	3,154	51.38
Alliance	Chia Chin Koon	2,985	48.62
Total valid votes		6,139	100.00
Total rejected ballots		178	
Unreturned ballots		0	
Turnout		6,317	78.68
Registered electors		8,029	
Majority		169	2.75
This was a new constituency created.
