= Bentong (federal constituency) =

Malaysian federal constituency

Bentong (P089)
Pahang constituency

Federal constituency
- Legislature: Dewan Rakyat
- MP: Young Syefura Othman; PH
- Constituency created: 1958
- First contested: 1959
- Last contested: 2022

Demographics
- Population (2020): 171,087
- Electors (2022): 87,058
- Area (km²): 1,866
- Pop. density (per km²): 91.7

Bentong is a federal constituency in Bentong District and Temerloh District, Pahang, Malaysia, that has been represented in the Dewan Rakyat since 1959.

The federal constituency was created in the 1958 redistribution and is mandated to return a single member to the Dewan Rakyat under the first past the post voting system.

== Demographics ==
彭亨国席 Pahang - 马来西亚第15届全国大选 | 中國報

Ethnic breakdown of Bentong's electorate as of 2022
1. Malay (49.4%)
2. Chinese (37.8%)
3. Indian (9.05%)
4. Other ethnicities (3.73%)

As of 2020, Bentong has a population of 117,801 people.

Age breakdown of Bentong's electorate as of 2022
1. 18-20 (5.38%)
2. 21-29 (19.1%)
3. 30-39 (22.4%)
4. 40-49 (17.5%)
5. 50-59 (15.2%)
6. 60-69 (11.7%)
7. 70-79 (6.40%)
8. 80-89 (2.16%)
9. above 90 (0.32%)
Gender breakdown of Bentong's electorate as of 2022
1. Male (51.0%)
2. Female (49.0%)

== History ==
=== Polling districts ===
According to the Federal Gazette issued on 31 October 2022, the Bentong constituency is divided into 40 polling districts.

State constituency	Polling district	Code	Location
Bilut (N33)	FELDA Lurah Bilut	089/33/01	SMK LKTP Lurah Bilut
Bilut (N33)	Kampung Lebu	089/33/02	SK Lebu
Bilut (N33)	Bandar Bentong	089/33/03	SK Sulaiman
Bilut (N33)	Kemansur	089/33/04	SJK (C) Khai Mun Pagi
Bilut (N33)	Chamang	089/33/05	SJK (T) Bentong
Bilut (N33)	Repas	089/33/06	SJK (C) Khai Mun Repas
Bilut (N33)	Chamang Luar	089/33/07	SJK (C) Khai Mun Chamang
Bilut (N33)	Chamang Baharu	089/33/08	SMJK Khai Mun
Bilut (N33)	Desa Damai	089/33/09	Dewan Orang Ramai Desa Damai
Bilut (N33)	Sungai Penjuring	089/33/10	SJK (C) Sungai Penjuring
Ketari (N34)	FELDA Mempaga 2	089/34/01	SK LKTP Mempaga 2
Ketari (N34)	FELDA Mempaga 3	089/34/02	SA Rakyat Mempaga 3
Ketari (N34)	FELDA Mempaga 1	089/34/03	SK LKTP Mempaga 1
Ketari (N34)	Sungai Dua	089/34/04	SK Sungai Dua
Ketari (N34)	Janda Baik	089/34/05	SK Janda Baik
Ketari (N34)	Bukit Tinggi	089/34/06	SJK (C) Bukit Tinggi
Ketari (N34)	Sri Layang	089/34/07	SK Sri Layang
Ketari (N34)	Genting Highlands	089/34/08	Genting Centre of Excellence Residential Staff Complex 8
Ketari (N34)	Benus	089/34/09	SMK Bentong
Ketari (N34)	Ketari	089/34/10	SMK Ketari
Ketari (N34)	Perting	089/34/11	SJK (C) Perting
Ketari (N34)	Kampung Baharu	089/34/12	SK Tuanku Fatimah
Ketari (N34)	Sungai Marong	089/34/13	SJK (C) Ketari
Sabai (N35)	FELDA Sertik	089/35/01	SK LKTP Kampung Sertik
Sabai (N35)	Jambu Rias	089/35/02	SK Jambu Rias
Sabai (N35)	Sri Telemong	089/35/03	SJK (T) Sri Telemong
Sabai (N35)	Pekan Karak	089/35/04	SMK Karak
Sabai (N35)	Karak Setia	089/35/05	SMK Karak Setia
Sabai (N35)	Bukit Dinding	089/35/06	SJK (T) Karak
Sabai (N35)	Taman Karak	089/35/07	SJK (C) Karak
Sabai (N35)	Kampung Baru Karak	089/35/08	SK Karak
Pelangai (N36)	FELDA Sungai Kemasul	089/36/01	SK LKTP Kemasul
Pelangai (N36)	FELDA Chemomoi	089/36/02	SMK LKTP Chemomoi
Pelangai (N36)	FELDA Sungai Kemahal	089/36/03	SK LKTP Sungai Kemahal
Pelangai (N36)	Kampung Jawi-Jawi	089/36/04	SK Pelangai
Pelangai (N36)	Simpang Pelangai	089/36/05	SMK Seri Pelangai
Pelangai (N36)	Manchis	089/36/06	SJK (C) Manchis
Pelangai (N36)	Sungai Gapoi	089/36/07	Dewan Serbaguna Sungai Gapoi
Pelangai (N36)	Telemong	089/36/08	SJK (C) Telemong
Pelangai (N36)	Sungai Perdak	089/36/09	Balai Raya Kg. Sungai Perdak

=== Representation history ===
Members of Parliament for Bentong
Parliament	No	Years	Member	Party	Vote Share
Constituency created from Semantan
Parliament of the Federation of Malaya
1st	P060	1959–1963	Chan Siang Sun (陈声新)	Alliance (MCA)	8,643; 62.70%
Parliament of Malaysia
1st	P060	1963–1964	Chan Siang Sun (陈声新)	Alliance (MCA)	8,643; 62.70%
2nd	P060	1964–1969	Chan Siang Sun (陈声新)	Alliance (MCA)	12,832; 65.74%
		1969–1971	Parliament was suspended		
3rd	P060	1971–1973	Chan Siang Sun (陈声新)	Alliance (MCA)	Uncontested
3rd	P060	1973–1974	Chan Siang Sun (陈声新)	BN (MCA)	Uncontested
4th	P070	1974–1978	Chan Siang Sun (陈声新)	BN (MCA)	12,064; 62.41%
5th	P070	1978–1982	Chan Siang Sun (陈声新)	BN (MCA)	16,606; 66.81%
6th	P070	1982–1986	Chan Siang Sun (陈声新)	BN (MCA)	15,091; 51.27%
7th	P079	1986–1989^{1}	Chan Siang Sun (陈声新)	BN (MCA)	16,777; 59.13%
7th	P079	1989–1990	Lim Ah Lek (林亚礼)	BN (MCA)	17,401; 60.70%
8th	P079	1990–1995	Lim Ah Lek (林亚礼)	BN (MCA)	22,486; 68.43%
9th	P083	1995–1999	Lim Ah Lek (林亚礼)	BN (MCA)	26,030; 78.24%
10th	P083	1999–2004	Liow Tiong Lai (廖中莱)	BN (MCA)	23,104; 65.09%
11th	P089	2004–2008^{²}	Liow Tiong Lai (廖中莱)	BN (MCA)	27,144; 72.48%
12th	P089	2008–2013	Liow Tiong Lai (廖中莱)	BN (MCA)	25,134; 66.63%
13th	P089	2013–2018	Liow Tiong Lai (廖中莱)	BN (MCA)	25,947; 50.37%
14th	P089	2018–2022	Wong Tack (黄德)	PH (DAP)	25,716; 46.67%
15th	P089	2022–present	Young Syefura Othman (يوڠ شيفور عثمان)	PH (DAP)	25,075; 37.62%

Note: ^{1}Bentong was renamed to Bentung in the 1984 redelineation, with most of its area retained. A minor portion was split off to form Mentakab. ^{²}Bentung was renamed to Bentong in the 2003 redelineation.

=== State constituency ===
Parliamentary constituency	State constituency						
Parliamentary constituency	1955–59*	1959–1974	1974–1986	1986–1995	1995–2004	2004–2018	2018–present
Bentong		Bandar Bentong					
Bentong		Benus					
Bentong				Bilut			
Bentong			Karak				
Bentong					Ketari		
Bentong		Mentakab					
Bentong				Pelangai			
Bentong		Sabai			Sabai		
Bentong			Semantan				

=== Historical boundaries ===
State Constituency	Area					
State Constituency	1959	1974	1984	1994	2003	2018
Bandar Bentong	Bentong; Chamang; Kampung Lebu; Kemansur; Sungai Penjuring					
Benus	Benus; Bukit Tinggi; Janda Baik; Ketari; Taman Sri Siantan					
Bilut			Bentong; Chamang; FELDA Lurah Bilut; Kemansur; Sungai Penjuring			
Karak		FELDA Lakum; FELDA Mempaga; Genting Highlands; Karak; Ketari	Benus; FELDA Mempaga; Genting Highlands; Karak; Ketari			
Ketari				Benus; Genting Highlands; FELDA Mempaga; Ketari; Perting		
Mentakab	Kampung Chatin; Kampung Chempaka; Lanchang; Mentakab; Songsang					
Pelangai			FELDA Chemomoi; FELDA Sungai Kemasul; Kampung Teroh; Manchis; Telemong	FELDA Chemomoi; FELDA Sungai Kemasul; Manchis; Simpang Pelangai; Telemong		
Sabai	Karak; Mancis; Mempaga; Sabai; Telemong			Bukit Dinding; FELDA Sertik; Jambu Rias; Karak; Telemong		
Semantan		FELDA Chemomoi; FELDA Sungai Kemasul; Lanchang; Manchis; Telemong				

=== Current state assembly members ===
No.	State Constituency	Member	Coalition (Party)
N33	Bilut	Lee Chin Chen	PH (DAP)
N34	Ketari	Thomas Su Keong Siong	PH (DAP)
N35	Sabai	Arumugam Vengatarakoo	BN (MIC)
N36	Pelangai	Amizar Abu Adam	BN (UMNO)

=== Local governments & postcodes ===
No.	State Constituency	Local Government	Postcode
N33	Bilut	Bentong Municipal Council	27600 Raub; 28310, 28320 Triang; 28500 Lanchang; 28600, 28610, 28620 Karak; 28700, 28730, 28740, 28750, 28800 Bentong; 69000 Cameron Highlands
N34	Ketari	Bentong Municipal Council	27600 Raub; 28310, 28320 Triang; 28500 Lanchang; 28600, 28610, 28620 Karak; 28700, 28730, 28740, 28750, 28800 Bentong; 69000 Cameron Highlands
N35	Sabai	Bentong Municipal Council; Temerloh Municipal Council (Kampung Lengkong area)	27600 Raub; 28310, 28320 Triang; 28500 Lanchang; 28600, 28610, 28620 Karak; 28700, 28730, 28740, 28750, 28800 Bentong; 69000 Cameron Highlands
N36	Pelangai	Bentong Municipal Council	27600 Raub; 28310, 28320 Triang; 28500 Lanchang; 28600, 28610, 28620 Karak; 28700, 28730, 28740, 28750, 28800 Bentong; 69000 Cameron Highlands

== Election results ==
Malaysian general election, 2022
Party	Candidate	Votes	%	∆%
PH	Young Syefura Othman	25,075	37.62	▲37.62
BN	Liow Tiong Lai	24,383	36.58	▼6.40
PN	Roslan Hassan	16,233	24.35	▲24.35
Independent	Wong Tack	798	1.20	▲1.20
Independent	Mohd Khalil Abdul Hamid	168	0.25	▲0.25
Total valid votes		66,657	100.00	
Total rejected ballots		675		
Unreturned ballots		150		
Turnout		67,452	76.57	▼6.82
Registered electors		87,058		
Majority		692	1.04	▼2.65
PH hold		Swing		
Source(s) https://lom.agc.gov.my/ilims/upload/portal/akta/outputp/1753278/PUB611_2022.pdf

Malaysian general election, 2018
Party	Candidate	Votes	%	∆%
PKR	Wong Tack	25,716	46.67	▲46.67
BN	Liow Tiong Lai	23,684	42.98	▼7.39
PAS	N. Balasubramaniam	5,706	10.35	▲10.35
Total valid votes		55,106	100.00	
Total rejected ballots		783		
Unreturned ballots		284		
Turnout		56,173	83.39	▼1.13
Registered electors		67,359		
Majority		2,032	3.69	▲2.95
PKR gain from BN		Swing		?
Source(s) "His Majesty's Government Gazette - Notice of Contested Election, Parliament for the State of Pahang [P.U. (B) 238/2018]" (PDF). Attorney General's Chambers of Malaysia. 3 May 2018. "Federal Government Gazette - Results of Contested Election and Statements of the Poll after the Official Addition of Votes, Parliamentary Constituencies for the State of Pahang [P.U. (B) 312/2018]" (PDF). Attorney General's Chambers of Malaysia. 28 May 2018.

Malaysian general election, 2013
Party	Candidate	Votes	%	∆%
BN	Liow Tiong Lai	25,947	50.37	▼16.26
DAP	Wong Tack	25,568	49.63	▲49.63
Total valid votes		51,515	100.00	
Total rejected ballots		988		
Unreturned ballots		125		
Turnout		52,628	84.52	▲11.51
Registered electors		62,266		
Majority		379	0.74	▼2.58
BN hold		Swing		
Source(s) "Federal Government Gazette - Notice of Contested Election, Parliament for the State of Pahang [P.U. (B) 175/2013]" (PDF). Attorney General's Chambers of Malaysia. 26 April 2013. "Federal Government Gazette - Results of Contested Election and Statements of the Poll after the Official Addition of Votes, Parliamentary Constituencies for the State of Pahang [P.U. (B) 216/2013]" (PDF). Attorney General's Chambers of Malaysia. 22 May 2013. Archived from the original (PDF) on 1 July 2019.

Malaysian general election, 2008
Party	Candidate	Votes	%	∆%
BN	Liow Tiong Lai	25,134	66.63	▼5.85
PKR	Ponusamy Govindasamy	12,585	33.37	▲33.37
Total valid votes		37,719	100.00	
Total rejected ballots		1,285		
Unreturned ballots		164		
Turnout		39,168	73.01	▼0.45
Registered electors		53,651		
Majority		12,549	33.26	▼11.70
BN hold		Swing		

Malaysian general election, 2004
Party	Candidate	Votes	%	∆%
BN	Liow Tiong Lai	27,144	72.48	▲7.39
DAP	Abu Bakar Lebai Sudin	10,305	27.52	▲27.52
Total valid votes		37,449	100.00	
Total rejected ballots		1,000		
Unreturned ballots		240		
Turnout		38,689	73.46	▲0.88
Registered electors		52,666		
Majority		16,839	44.96	▲14.78
BN hold		Swing		

Malaysian general election, 1999
Party	Candidate	Votes	%	∆%
BN	Liow Tiong Lai	23,104	65.09	▼13.15
PKR	Abdul Wahab Sudin	12,389	34.91	▲13.15
Total valid votes		35,493	100.00	
Total rejected ballots		848		
Unreturned ballots		655		
Turnout		36,996	72.58	▲0.20
Registered electors		50,972		
Majority		10,715	30.18	▼26.30
BN hold		Swing		

Malaysian general election, 1995
Party	Candidate	Votes	%	∆%
BN	Lim Ah Lek	26,030	78.24	▲9.81
DAP	Leong Chee Meng	7,241	21.76	▼9.81
Total valid votes		33,271	100.00	
Total rejected ballots		1,465		
Unreturned ballots		827		
Turnout		35,563	72.38	▼0.26
Registered electors		49,133		
Majority		18,789	56.48	▲19.62
BN hold		Swing		

Malaysian general election, 1990
Party	Candidate	Votes	%	∆%
BN	Lim Ah Lek	22,486	68.43	▲7.73
DAP	Woo Chee Wan	10,375	31.57	▲0.54
Total valid votes		32,861	100.00	
Total rejected ballots		1,189		
Unreturned ballots		0		
Turnout		34,050	72.64	▲0.65
Registered electors		46,872		
Majority		12,111	36.86	▲7.19
BN hold		Swing		

Malaysian general by-election, 13 May 1989 Upon the death of incumbent, Chan Siang Sun
Party	Candidate	Votes	%	∆%
BN	Lim Ah Lek	17,401	60.70	▲1.57
DAP	Lip Tuck Chee	8,895	31.03	▼4.41
Independent	Mohamed Basri Mahidin	2,137	7.45	▲7.45
Independent	M. Palanisamy	193	0.67	▲0.67
Independent	R. Appu @ Ramakrishnan	42	0.15	▲0.15
Total valid votes		28,668	100.00	
Total rejected ballots		309		
Unreturned ballots		0		
Turnout		28,977	71.99	▼2.09
Registered electors		40,252		
Majority		8,506	29.67	▲5.98
BN hold		Swing		

Malaysian general election, 1986
Party	Candidate	Votes	%	∆%
BN	Chan Siang Sun	16,777	59.13	▲7.86
DAP	Lip Tuck Chee	10,055	35.44	▼1.97
PAS	Mat Shum Sidek	1,541	5.43	▲5.43
Total valid votes		28,373	100.00	
Total rejected ballots		718		
Unreturned ballots		0		
Turnout		29,091	74.08	▼2.34
Registered electors		39,270		
Majority		6,722	23.69	▲9.83
BN hold		Swing		

Malaysian general election, 1982
Party	Candidate	Votes	%	∆%
BN	Chan Siang Sun	15,091	51.27	▼15.54
DAP	Tommy Liew	11,011	37.41	▲4.22
Independent	Mohamed Basri Mahidin	3,335	11.33	▲11.33
Total valid votes		29,437	100.00	
Total rejected ballots		1,301		
Unreturned ballots		0		
Turnout		30,738	76.42	▼1.87
Registered electors		40,222		
Majority		4,080	13.86	▼19.76
BN hold		Swing		

Malaysian general election, 1978
Party	Candidate	Votes	%	∆%
BN	Chan Siang Sun	16,606	66.81	▲4.40
DAP	Lip Tuck Chee	8,248	33.19	▲2.66
Total valid votes		24,854	100.00	
Total rejected ballots		1,495		
Unreturned ballots		0		
Turnout		26,349	78.29	▲0.35
Registered electors		33,656		
Majority		8,358	33.62	▲1.74
BN hold		Swing		

Malaysian general election, 1974
Party	Candidate	Votes	%	∆%
BN	Chan Siang Sun	12,064	62.41	▲62.41
DAP	Lau Dak Kee	5,902	30.53	▲30.53
Parti Rakyat Malaysia	Sakeh @ Seheh Abdul Rashid @ Mohamed Yatim	1,363	7.05	▲7.05
Total valid votes		19,329	100.00	
Total rejected ballots		1,108		
Unreturned ballots		0		
Turnout		20,437	77.94	
Registered electors		27,378		
Majority		6,162	31.88	
BN hold		Swing		

Malaysian general election, 1969
Party	Candidate	Votes	%	∆%
On the nomination day, Chan Siang Sun won uncontested.
Alliance	Chan Siang Sun			
Total valid votes			100.00	
Total rejected ballots				
Unreturned ballots				
Turnout				
Registered electors		28,187		
Majority				
Alliance hold		Swing		

Malaysian general election, 1964
Party	Candidate	Votes	%	∆%
Alliance	Chan Siang Sun	12,832	65.74	▲3.04
Socialist Front	Phoon Chee Kai	6,686	34.26	▼3.04
Total valid votes		19,518	100.00	
Total rejected ballots		846		
Unreturned ballots		0		
Turnout		20,364	80.87	▲2.68
Registered electors		25,182		
Majority		6,146	31.48	▲6.08
Alliance hold		Swing		

Malayan general election, 1959
Party	Candidate	Votes	%
Alliance	Chan Siang Sun	8,643	62.70
Socialist Front	Lim Ong Hang	5,141	37.30
Total valid votes		13,784	100.00
Total rejected ballots		157	
Unreturned ballots		0	
Turnout		13,941	78.19
Registered electors		17,829	
Majority		3,502	25.40
This was a new constituency created.
