= Chua Tee Yong =

Malaysian politician (born 1977)

Yang Berbahagia Datuk Chua Tee Yong DPSM
- 蔡智勇

Deputy Minister of International Trade and Industry
- In office 27 June 2016 – 9 May 2018 Serving with Ahmad Maslan
- Monarchs: Abdul Halim; Muhammad V
- Prime Minister: Najib Razak
- Minister: Mustapa Mohamed; Ong Ka Chuan
- Preceded by: Lee Chee Leong
- Succeeded by: Ong Kian Ming
- Constituency: Labis

Deputy Minister of Finance
- In office 27 June 2014 – 27 June 2016 Serving with Ahmad Maslan (2013–2015); Johari Abdul Ghani (2015–2016)
- Monarch: Abdul Halim
- Prime Minister: Najib Razak
- Minister: Najib Razak; Ahmad Husni Hanadzlah
- Preceded by: Position Established
- Succeeded by: Lee Chee Leong
- Constituency: Labis

Deputy Minister of Agriculture and Agro-based Industry
- In office 4 June 2010 – 15 May 2013 Serving with Mohd Johari Baharum
- Monarchs: Mizan Zainal Abidin; Abdul Halim
- Prime Minister: Najib Razak
- Minister: Noh Omar
- Preceded by: Rohani Abdul Karim
- Succeeded by: Tajuddin Abdul Rahman
- Constituency: Labis

Member of the Malaysian Parliament for Labis
- In office 8 March 2008 – 9 May 2018
- Preceded by: Chua Soi Lek (BN–MCA)
- Succeeded by: Pang Hok Liong (PH–DAP)
- Majority: 4,094 (2008); 353 (2013)

Personal details
- Born: 19 October 1977 (age 48) Johor, Malaysia
- Citizenship: Malaysian
- Party: Malaysian Chinese Association (MCA)
- Other political affiliations: Barisan Nasional (BN)
- Spouse: Neesa Yap Lee Yune
- Parent(s): Chua Soi Lek, Wong Sek Hin
- Occupation: Politician
- Profession: Accountant
- Website: chuateeyonglabis.blogspot.com

Chua Tee Yong (Chinese: 蔡智勇; Pe̍h-ōe-jī: Chhuà Tì-ióng; born 19 October 1977) is a Malaysian politician and was the Member of parliament of Malaysia for the Labis constituency in the State of Johor for two terms (2008-2018). He was one of the four Vice-Presidents of the Malaysian Chinese Association (MCA) in the ruling Barisan Nasional (BN) coalition then with the third highest votes for the party election term from 21 December 2013 until 4 November 2018.

Chua was elected to federal Parliament in the 2008 election, succeeding his father Chua Soi Lek in the seat of Labis. In June 2010, he was appointed Deputy Agriculture and Agro-based Industries Minister in a Cabinet reshuffle. The MCA temporarily withdrew from the government after its poor performance in the 2013 election. Upon its return in 2014, Chua was appointed as Deputy Minister for Finance. Chua is an accountant and was chief financial officer of a government-linked company. He served as the Deputy Minister of International Trade and Industry from 2015 to 2018. In the 2018 election he lost and failed to retain his parliamentary seat.

== Election results ==
Parliament of Malaysia
| Year | Constituency | Candidate | Votes | Pct | Opponent(s) | Votes | Pct | Ballots cast | Majority | Turnout |
|---|---|---|---|---|---|---|---|---|---|---|
| 2008 | P142 Labis | Chua Tee Yong (MCA) | 13,658 | 56.72% | Teo Eng Ching (DAP) | 9,564 | 39.72% | 24,080 | 4,094 | 71.95% |
| 2013 | P142 Labis | Chua Tee Yong (MCA) | 15,821 | 49.47% | Ramakrishnan Suppiah (DAP) | 15,468 | 48.37% | 31,978 | 353 | 84.90% |
| 2018 | P142 Labis | Chua Tee Yong (MCA) | 13,301 | 41.53% | Pang Hok Liong (DAP) | 16,709 | 52.17% | 32,030 | 3,408 | 80.76% |
| 2018 | P142 Labis | Chua Tee Yong (MCA) | 13,301 | 41.53% | Ahmad Sarchu Sawal (PAS) | 2,020 | 6.31% | 32,030 | 3,408 | 80.76% |
| 2022 | P142 Labis | Chua Tee Yong (MCA) | 13,300 | 38.28% | Pang Hok Liong (DAP) | 16,133 | 46.43% | 34,745 | 2,833 | 69.70% |
| 2022 | P142 Labis | Chua Tee Yong (MCA) | 13,300 | 38.28% | Alvin Chang Teck Kiam (BERSATU) | 5,312 | 15.29% | 34,745 | 2,833 | 69.70% |

== Honours ==
- Malacca
  - Companion Class II of the Exalted Order of Malacca (DPSM) – Datuk (2011)
