= Tan Chong =

Malaysian politician

Yang Berhormat Tan Chong MLA
- 陈宗

Member of the Johor State Legislative Assembly for Bekok
- Incumbent
- Assumed office 2022
- Preceded by: Ramakrishnan Suppiah

Personal details
- Born: Tan Chong; 3 July 1965 (age 61)
- Citizenship: Malaysian
- Party: MCA
- Other political affiliations: Barisan Nasional
- Occupation: Politician

Tan Chong (Chinese: 陈宗, born 3 July 1965), a Malaysian politician from Segamat, Johor. He currently serves as Member of the Johor State Legislative Assembly (MLA) for Bekok since March 2022. He is a member of the Malaysian Chinese Association (MCA), a component party of the BN coalition.

== Political background ==
In 2022 Johor State Election, Tan Chong has elected as Bekok state Assemblyman.

In 2023 Malaysian Chinese Association election, Tan Chong contested as Central Committee Member and elected as one of twenty five (25) Central Committee Members.

== Election result ==
Johor State Legislative Assembly
Year	Constituency	Candidate	Votes	Pct.	Opponent(s)	Votes	Pct.	Ballots cast	Majority	Turnout
2022	N06 Bekok	Tan Chong (MCA)	7,036	51.31%	M Kanan (DAP)	3,467	25.28%	14,071	3,569	51.31%
2022	N06 Bekok	Tan Chong (MCA)	7,036	51.31%	Tan Lek Khang (BERSATU)	2,881	21.01%	14,071	3,569	51.31%
2022	N06 Bekok	Tan Chong (MCA)	7,036	51.31%	Sandara Segaran Arumugam (WARISAN)	330	2.40%	14,071	3,569	51.31%
2026	N06 Bekok	Tan Chong (MCA)	10,230	63.16%	Tay Yok Jiuen (DAP)	5,967	36.84%	16,197	4,263	60.35%
