= Mentakab (state constituency) =

State constituency in Pahang, Malaysia

Mentakab (N30)
Pahang constituency

State constituency
- Legislature: Pahang State Legislative Assembly
MLA
Woo Chee Wan
PH
- Constituency created: 1959
- Constituency abolished: 1984
- Constituency re-created: 2003
- First contested: 1959
- Last contested: 2022

Demographics
- Electors (2022): 37,269

Mentakab is a state constituency in Pahang, Malaysia. The current state assemblyman is Woo Chee Wan from DAP.

== Demographics ==
Ethnic breakdown of Mentakab's electorate as of 2022
1. Malay (46.8%)
2. Chinese (39.3%)
3. Indian (11.4%)
4. Other ethnicities (2.53%)

== Polling districts ==
According to the federal gazette issued on 31 October 2022, the Mentakab constituency is divided into 12 polling districts.

State constituency	Polling district	Code	Location
Mentakab (N30）	Taman Rimba	088/30/01	Kawasan Lapang Jalan Bendera Puteri Taman Bukit Bendera Mentakab
Mentakab (N30）	Bukit Bendera	088/30/02	SMJK Hwa Lian
Mentakab (N30）	Bandar Mentakab	088/30/03	SJK (T) Mentakab
Mentakab (N30）	Sungai Semantan	088/30/04	Dewan Seri Mentakab
Mentakab (N30）	Tanjung Kerayong	088/30/05	SK Abu Bakar
Mentakab (N30）	Kampung Baharu	088/30/06	SJK (C) Mentakab 1
Mentakab (N30）	Kampung Sungai Ara	088/30/07	SK Bandar Mentakab
Mentakab (N30）	Mentakab Tengah	088/30/08	SJK (C) Mentakab 2
Mentakab (N30）	Taman Ksm	088/30/09	SMK Mentakab
Mentakab (N30）	Kampung Chatin	088/30/10	SMK Bukit Cermin
Mentakab (N30）	Sri Kemuning	088/30/11	SK Tanjong Lalang
Mentakab (N30）	Temerloh Jaya	088/30/12	SK Temerloh Jaya

== History ==
=== Representation history ===
Members of the Legislative Assembly for Mentakab
Assembly	No	Years	Name	Party
Constituency created
Mentekab
1st	N08	1959-1964	Salehuddin Awang Pekan	Alliance (UMNO)
2nd	N08	1964-1969	Syed Abdullah Syed Ali	Alliance (UMNO)
		1969-1971	Assembly dissolved	
3rd	N08	1971-1973	Syed Abdullah Syed Ali	Alliance (UMNO)
3rd	N08	1973-1974	Syed Abdullah Syed Ali	BN (UMNO)
4th	N29	1974-1978	Annuar Mohd Seh	BN (UMNO)
5th	N29	1978-1982	Idris Long	BN (UMNO)
6th	N29	1982-1986	Abdul Aziz Rahman	BN (UMNO)
Constituency split into Lancang and Sanggang
Constituency recreated from Sanggang and Lanchang
Mentakab
11th	N30	2004-2008	Chuah Boon Seong (蔡文祥)	BN (MCA)
12th	N30	2008-2013	Chuah Boon Seong (蔡文祥)	BN (MCA)
13th	N30	2013-2018	Tengku Zulpuri Shah Raja Puji	PR (DAP)
14th	N30	2018-2022	Woo Chee Wan (胡智云)	PH (DAP)
15th	N30	2022–present	Woo Chee Wan (胡智云)	PH (DAP)

== Election results ==
Pahang state election, 2022
Party	Candidate	Votes	%	∆%
PH	Woo Chee Wan	12,905	44.97	▲44.97
PN	Mohd Yusoff Abdullah	9,248	32.22	▲33.22
BN	Wong Tze Shiang	5,996	20.89	▼1.01
PEJUANG	Abdul Wahab Kadir	287	1.00	▲1.00
Total valid votes		28,699	100.00	
Total rejected ballots		182		
Unreturned ballots		81		
Turnout		28,962	76.97	▼4.71
Registered electors		37,269		
Majority		3,657	12.75	▼15.32
PH hold		Swing		

Pahang state election, 2018
Party	Candidate	Votes	%	∆%
PKR	Woo Chee Wan	10,547	50.78	▲50.78
PAS	Abirerah Awang Chik	4,718	22.71	▲22.71
BN	Wong Tat Chee @ Wong Tai Chee	4,548	21.90	▼22.63
Independent	Chuah Boon Seong	958	4.61	▲4.61
Total valid votes		20,771	100.00	
Total rejected ballots				
Unreturned ballots				
Turnout		20,771	81.68	▼3.25
Registered electors		25,431		
Majority		5,829	28.07	▲17.13
PKR hold		Swing		

Pahang state election, 2013
Party	Candidate	Votes	%	∆%
DAP	Tengku Zulpuri Shah Raja Puji	7,882	55.47	▲20.49
BN	Chuah Boon Seong	6,328	44.53	▼12.43
Total valid votes		14,210	100.00	
Total rejected ballots		220		
Unreturned ballots				
Turnout		14,430	84.93	▲9.23
Registered electors		16,991		
Majority		1,554	10.94	▼11.04
DAP gain from BN		Swing		?

Pahang state election, 2008
Party	Candidate	Votes	%	∆%
BN	Chuah Boon Seong	6,321	56.96	▼11.57
DAP	Ng Kwi Ling	3,882	34.98	▲3.51
Independent	Mohd Shokri Mahmood	863	7.78	▲7.78
Total valid votes		11,097	100.00	
Total rejected ballots		366		
Unreturned ballots		0		
Turnout		11,463	75.70	▲0.75
Registered electors		15,143		
Majority		2,439	21.98	▼15.08
BN hold		Swing		

Pahang state election, 2004
Party	Candidate	Votes	%	∆%
BN	Chuah Boon Seong	7,316	68.53	▲68.53
DAP	Ng Kwi Ling	3,360	31.47	▲31.47
Total valid votes		10,676	100.00	
Total rejected ballots		611		
Unreturned ballots		33		
Turnout		11,320	74.95	
Registered electors		15,103		
Majority		3,956	37.06	
BN hold		Swing		

Pahang state election, 1969
Party	Candidate	Votes	%	∆%
Alliance	Syed Abdullah Syed Ali	3,416	57.00	▲4.65
Parti Rakyat Malaysia	Mohamed Ya'akub	1,597	26.65	▲26.65
PMIP	Ahmad Hussin	980	16.35	▲16.35
Total valid votes		5,993	100.00	
Total rejected ballots		136		
Unreturned ballots		0		
Turnout		6,129	67.83	▼8.19
Registered electors		9,036		
Majority		1,819	30.35	▲12.62
Alliance hold		Swing		

Pahang state election, 1964
Party	Candidate	Votes	%	∆%
Alliance	Syed Abdullah Syed Ali	2,999	52.35	▲3.55
Socialist Front	Lim Ong Hang	1,983	34.61	▲34.61
Independent	Meriam binti Mohamad	616	10.75	▲10.75
Independent	Abdul Wahab Mohamed Zabidin	131	2.29	▲2.29
Total valid votes		5,729	100.00	
Total rejected ballots		440		
Unreturned ballots		0		
Turnout		6,169	76.02	▼2.68
Registered electors		8,115		
Majority		1,016	17.73	▼0.55
Alliance hold		Swing		

Pahang state election, 1959
Party	Candidate	Votes	%
Alliance	Sallehuddin Awang Pekan	2,330	48.80
Socialist Front	Mat Yaacob	1,457	30.51
PMIP	Mohd. Said Ibrahim	988	20.69
Total valid votes		4,775	100.00
Total rejected ballots		66	
Unreturned ballots		0	
Turnout		4,841	78.70
Registered electors		6,151	
Majority		873	18.28
This was a new constituency created.
