= Chua Soi Lek =

Malaysian politician

Yang Berbahagia Tan Sri Datuk Seri Panglima Dr Chua Soi Lek PSM SPDK DGSM DPMJ SMJ PIS PPN
- 蔡细历
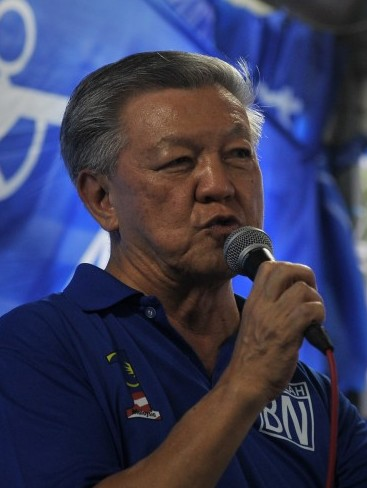
- Chua in 2013

Minister of Health
- In office 27 March 2004 – 2 January 2008
- Monarchs: Sirajuddin; Mizan Zainal Abidin
- Prime Minister: Abdullah Ahmad Badawi
- Deputy: Abdul Latiff Ahmad
- Preceded by: Chua Jui Meng
- Succeeded by: Ong Ka Ting (Acting)
- Constituency: Labis

9th President of Malaysian Chinese Association
- In office 28 March 2010 – 21 December 2013
- Preceded by: Ong Tee Keat
- Succeeded by: Liow Tiong Lai

Member of the Malaysian Parliament for Labis
- In office 28 March 2004 – 2 January 2008
- Preceded by: Ling Liong Sik (MCA - BN)
- Succeeded by: Chua Tee Yong (MCA - BN)
- Majority: 10,729 (2004)

Member of the Johor State Legislative Assembly for Penggaram
- In office 3 August 1986 – 21 March 2004
- Preceded by: Tan Peng Khoon (MCA - BN)
- Succeeded by: Koh Chee Chai (MCA - BN)
- Majority: 3,990 (1986); 4,108 (1990); 14,037 (1995); 13,460 (1999)

Personal details
- Born: Chua Soi Lek; 2 January 1947 (age 79) Batu Pahat, Johor, Malayan Union (now Malaysia)
- Citizenship: Malaysian
- Party: Malaysian Chinese Association (MCA)
- Other political affiliations: Barisan Nasional (BN)
- Spouse: Wong Sek Hin (黄薛卿)
- Children: Chua Tee Yong
- Education: University of Malaya
- Occupation: Politician; Psychiatrist
- Website: www.drchuasoilek.com drchua9.blogspot.com
- Chua Soi Lek on Facebook; Chua Soi Lek on Parliament of Malaysia

Chua Soi Lek (simplified Chinese: 蔡细历; traditional Chinese: 蔡細歷; pinyin: Cài Xìlì; Pe̍h-ōe-jī: Chhòa Sòe-le̍k; born 2 January 1947), also known as Chua Kin Seng, is a Chinese Malaysian politician from the state of Johor. He was the 9th President of the Malaysian Chinese Association (MCA), a major component party in Barisan Nasional (BN) coalition from 2010 until 2013. He held the post of Minister of Health from 2004 until 2008. He has also been a one-term Member of Parliament (MP) for Labis (2004–2008) and a 4-term Member of the Johor State Legislative Assembly (MLA) for Penggaram from 1986 to 2004.

== Early life ==
He was born in Batu Pahat, Johor. Chua received his early education at Sekolah Kebangsaan Lim Poon, then Batu Pahat High School and Muar High School. He was educated in medicine (MBBS) at the University of Malaya in 1968–1973.

Chua set up his medical practice in May 1976 after serving as a medical officer at the Batu Pahat Hospital. He sold the clinic in 1992 to pursue a full-time career in politics with MCA.

== Political career ==
He was first elected as a state assemblyman for Penggaram, Johor on MCA's ticket in 1986. He continued to serve Penggaram for 18 years through four consecutive state elections. Later, he became a Johor state government executive councillor. In the 2004 general election, he contested for the Labis parliamentary seat under the Barisan Nasional coalition and claimed victory. The then Prime Minister Tun Abdullah Ahmad Badawi appointed Chua into the Malaysian cabinet as the Minister of Health following that victory.

He held several prominent posts throughout his later career. He was the MP for Labis, a MCA vice-president, Johor MCA state liaison committee chairman as well as Batu Pahat MCA division chairman until he resigned from all public and political offices on 2 January 2008 due to the eruption of a sensational sex scandal.

=== MCA deputy presidency ===
In the 2008 general elections, MCA won only 15 parliamentary seats out of 40 they contested. Some grassroots leaders and former top leaders including Dr Chua, demanded the President, Ong Ka Ting, step down to take responsibility.

He returned to active politics in the second half of 2008 and won the Batu Pahat Division chairman post uncontested. Then he contested the MCA deputy presidency, defeating Ong Ka Chuan, Donald Lim and Lee Hak Teik in a four-cornered fight.

Despite that, Dr Chua was only appointed chairman of the Government Policy Monitoring bureau and left out of the MCA leadership in Johor by party president, Ong Tee Keat. This was seen as a move to isolate Dr Chua politically. Eventually, Chua was expelled from the party in August 2009 by the MCA Disciplinary Committee for his past sex scandal.

=== 2009 Extraordinary General Meeting ===
In 2009, Chua's supporters sparked an Extraordinary General Meeting (EGM) to challenge Ong Tee Keat's presidency and to reinstate Dr Chua back as a MCA member and deputy president.

The EGM was held on 10 October, where a number of resolutions were made challenging Chua's removal from MCA and his sacking as deputy president of MCA. A vote of no confidence against Datuk Seri Ong Tee Keat passed by 14 votes. In the other resolution, Dr Chua's expulsion was overturned. Ong and Chua both refused to resign, and united under a "greater unity plan," putting their differences aside temporarily. However, some central committee members, led by Liow Tiong Lai, previously aligned with Ong, demanded fresh elections.

=== MCA presidency ===
In early March 2010, Chua and his supporters in the central committee (CC), joined other CCs led by Liow Tiong Lai, in resigning. With the resignation of two-thirds of the central committee, fresh elections were to be held as per the party constitution. Chua contested the presidency against incumbent Ong Tee Keat and former president Ong Ka Ting. In the three-cornered fight, Chua emerged victorious while incumbent Tee Keat finished in third place. After becoming president, Chua focused on rebuilding the appearance of unity within MCA after a year of public infighting.

=== Political debates ===
In February 2012, Chua broke from Malaysian political norms by having a public debate with Lim Guan Eng, Chief Minister of Penang. The first debate continued with another public debate, labelled as Debate 2.0, that was held on 8 July 2012. Both debates generated tremendous public and media interest.

=== MCA poor performance in 13th general election ===
In the 2013 Malaysian general election MCA only won 7 of the 37 federal seats and 11 of the 90 state seats it contested. In the general election in 2008, it won 15 parliamentary and 32 state seats. Chua said MCA remained adamant in not accepting any government post at both state and federal level, following its dismal performance in the just-concluded 13th General Election. The poor performance in the election led to calls for Chua's resignation. Chua did not enter the following party poll for president, and in December 2013, Liow Tiong Lai was elected the President of MCA.

== Controversy ==
=== Sex scandal ===
On 1 January 2008, Chua Soi Lek admitted that he was the person featured in a sensational sex DVD that was widely being circulated in Johor. The two DVDs were distributed anonymously in Muar and other towns in Johor show Chua having scandal with a young woman, described by him as a "personal friend." The DVDs are believed to be wireless hidden camera recordings in a hotel suite.

He claimed no involvement in the filming or production of the DVD in question. On 2 January 2008, he formally announced his resignation from all posts including Member of Parliament for Labis, vice presidency of MCA, and Minister of Health at a press conference.

Chua later remarked his downfall was due to his dedication to his work as Health Minister and MCA Vice-President, which caused his political rivals to grow suspicious of him.

== Personal life ==
Chua is married to Puan Sri Wong Sek Hin and the couple have three children. One of their sons, Chua Tee Yong had replaced him as Labis MP.

== Election results ==
Johor State Legislative Assembly
Year	Constituency	Candidate	Votes	Pct	Opponent(s)	Votes	Pct	Ballots cast	Majority	Turnout
1986	N21 Penggaram	Chua Soi Lek (MCA)	11,633	49.07%	Gan Ah Leong (DAP)	7,643	32.24%	23,708	3,990	72.10%
1986	N21 Penggaram	Chua Soi Lek (MCA)	11,633	49.07%	Mohamed bin Salleh (PAS)	1,449	6.11%	23,708	3,990	72.10%
1986	N21 Penggaram	Chua Soi Lek (MCA)	11,633	49.07%	Tan Lem Huat (SDP)	532	2.24%	23,708	3,990	72.10%
1990	N21 Penggaram	Chua Soi Lek (MCA)	15,161	54.66%	Lee Hwah Beng (DAP)	11,053	39.85%	27,737	4,108	74.82%
1995	N23 Penggaram	Chua Soi Lek (MCA)	20,174	72.30%	Gan Peck Cheng (DAP)	6,137	21.99%	27,905	14,037	73.97%
1999	N23 Penggaram	Chua Soi Lek (MCA)	20,809	70.41%	Gan Peck Cheng (DAP)	7,349	24.87%	29,552	13,460	74.95%

Parliament of Malaysia
Year	Constituency	Candidate	Votes	Pct	Opponent(s)	Votes	Pct	Ballots cast	Majority	Turnout
2004	P142 Labis	Chua Soi Lek (MCA)	16,469	71.38%	Tee Gey Yan (DAP)	5,740	24.88%	23,073	10,729	70.95%

== Honours ==
=== Honours of Malaysia ===
- Malaysia
  - Medal of the Order of the Defender of the Realm (PPN) (1978)
  - Commander of the Order of Loyalty to the Crown of Malaysia (PSM) – Tan Sri (2014)
- Johor
  - Sultan Ibrahim Medal (PIS) (1979)
  - Companion of the Order of the Crown of Johor (SMJ) (1997)
  - Knight Commander of the Order of the Crown of Johor (DPMJ) – Dato' (1999)
- Malacca
  - Grand Commander of the Exalted Order of Malacca (DGSM) – Datuk Seri (2006)
- Sabah
  - Grand Commander of the Order of Kinabalu (SPDK) – Datuk Seri Panglima (2006)

Political offices
Preceded by Ong Tee Keat	Malaysian Chinese Association (MCA) President; 28 March 2010 – 21 December 2013	Succeeded by Liow Tiong Lai
