= Ketari (state constituency) =

Political subdivision in Malaysia

Ketari (N34)
Pahang constituency

State constituency
- Legislature: Pahang State Legislative Assembly
MLA
Thomas Su Keong Siong
PH
- Constituency created: 2003
- First contested: 2004
- Last contested: 2022

Demographics
- Electors (2022): 30,758

Ketari is a state constituency in Pahang, Malaysia, that is represented in the Pahang State Legislative Assembly.

== Demographics ==
Ethnic breakdown of Ketari's electorate as of 2022
1. Malay (51.6%)
2. Chinese (39.5%)
3. Indian (4.73%)
4. Other ethnicities (4.25%)

== History ==
=== Polling districts ===
According to the federal gazette issued on 31 October 2022, the Ketari constituency is divided into 13 polling districts.

State constituency	Polling district	Code	Location
Ketari (N34)	FELDA Mempaga 2	089/34/01	SK LKTP Mempaga 2
Ketari (N34)	FELDA Mempaga 3	089/34/02	SA Rakyat Mempaga 3
Ketari (N34)	FELDA Mempaga 1	089/34/03	SK LKTP Mempaga 1
Ketari (N34)	Sungai Dua	089/34/04	SK Sungai Dua
Ketari (N34)	Janda Baik	089/34/05	SK Janda Baik
Ketari (N34)	Bukit Tinggi	089/34/06	SJK (C) Bukit Tinggi
Ketari (N34)	Sri Layang	089/34/07	SK Sri Layang
Ketari (N34)	Genting Highlands	089/34/08	Genting Centre of Excellence Residential Staff Complex 8
Ketari (N34)	Benus	089/34/09	SMK Bentong
Ketari (N34)	Ketari	089/34/10	SMK Ketari
Ketari (N34)	Perting	089/34/11	SJK (C) Perting
Ketari (N34)	Kampung Baharu	089/34/12	SK Tuanku Fatimah
Ketari (N34)	Sungai Marong	089/34/13	SJK (C) Ketari

=== Representation history ===
Members of the Legislative Assembly for Ketari
Assembly	No	Years	Name	Party
Constituency created from Karak
9th	N29	1995-1999	Loke Koon Kam (陆官金)	BN (GERAKAN)
10th	N29	1999-2002	Loke Koon Kam (陆官金)	BN (GERAKAN)
10th	N29	2002-2004	Yum Ah Ha @ Yim Ah Ha (厌雅厦)	BN (GERAKAN)
11th	N34	2004-2008	Ng Keong Chye (黃恭才)	BN (GERAKAN)
12th	N34	2008-2013	Ng Keong Chye (黃恭才)	BN (GERAKAN)
13th	N34	2013-2015	Lee Chin Chen (李政贤)	PR (DAP)
13th	N34	2015-2018	Lee Chin Chen (李政贤)	PH (DAP)
14th	N34	2018-2022	Young Syefura Othman	PH (DAP)
15th	N34	2022–present	Thomas Su Keong Siong (苏建祥)	PH (DAP)

== Election results ==
Pahang state election, 2022
Party	Candidate	Votes	%	∆%
PH	Thomas Su Keong Siong	9,722	41.17	▲41.17
BN	Amizar Abu Adam	9,602	40.66	▲8.72
PN	William Tan Wei Leong	4,290	18.17	▲18.17
Total valid votes		23,614	100.00	
Total rejected ballots		242		
Unreturned ballots		46		
Turnout		23,902	77.71	▼6.13
Registered electors		30,758		
Majority		120	0.51	▼18.72
PH hold		Swing		

Pahang state election, 2018
Party	Candidate	Votes	%	∆%
PKR	Young Syefura Othman	9,873	51.17	▲51.17
BN	Lau Hoi Keong	6,163	31.94	▲31.94
PAS	Roslan Md Esa	3,260	16.89	▲16.89
Total valid votes		19,296	100.00	
Total rejected ballots		236		
Unreturned ballots		174		
Turnout		19,706	83.83	▼0.65
Registered electors		23,506		
Majority		3,710	19.23	▲7.31
PKR hold		Swing		

Pahang state election, 2013
Party	Candidate	Votes	%	∆%
DAP	Lee Chin Chen	10,050	55.96	▲9.41
BN	Woong Choo Yak	7,910	44.04	▲44.04
Total valid votes		17,960	100.00	
Total rejected ballots		316		
Unreturned ballots		40		
Turnout		18,316	84.48	▲13.33
Registered electors		21,681		
Majority		2,140	11.92	▲5.02
DAP gain from BN		Swing		-

Pahang state election, 2008
Party	Candidate	Votes	%	∆%
BN	Ng Keong Chye	6,835	53.45	▼8.81
DAP	Lee Kok Yeep	5,953	46.55	▲8.81
Total valid votes		12,788	100.00	
Total rejected ballots		261		
Unreturned ballots		32		
Turnout		13,081	71.15	▼2.80
Registered electors		18,384		
Majority		882	6.90	▼17.63
BN hold		Swing		

Pahang state election, 2004
Party	Candidate	Votes	%	∆%
BN	Ng Keong Chye	8,079	62.26	▲3.16
DAP	Kam Hah @ Cheong Koon Kam	4,897	37.74	▼3.16
Total valid votes		12,976	100.00	
Total rejected ballots		257		
Unreturned ballots		23		
Turnout		13,256	73.95	▲2.47
Registered electors		17,925		
Majority		3,182	24.52	▲6.31
BN hold		Swing		

Pahang state by-election, 1 April 2002 upon the death of incumbent Loke Koon Kam
Party	Candidate	Votes	%	∆%
BN	Yum Ah Ha	7,153	58.39	▲8.10
DAP	Choong Siew Onn	4,949	40.40	▼8.10
Total valid votes		12,102	98.78	
Total rejected ballots		149	1.22	
Unreturned ballots		4		
Turnout		12,255	71.48	▼0.75
Registered electors		17,144		
Majority		2,204	18.21	▲16.21
BN hold		Swing		

Pahang state election, 1999
Party	Candidate	Votes	%	∆%
BN	Loke Koon Kam	5,874	51.00	▼8.74
DAP	Choong Siew Onn	5,643	49.00	▲15.40
Total valid votes		11,517	100.00	
Total rejected ballots		303		
Unreturned ballots		50		
Turnout		11,870	72.23	▼0.28
Registered electors		16,434		
Majority		231	2.01	▼24.14
BN hold		Swing		

Pahang state election, 1995
Party	Candidate	Votes	%
BN	Loke Koon Kam	6,627	59.75
DAP	Choong Siew Onn	3,727	33.60
Independent	Mohd Shah Ijah	738	6.65
Total valid votes		11,092	100.00
Total rejected ballots		268	
Unreturned ballots		67	
Turnout		11,427	72.51
Registered electors		15,759	
Majority		2,900	26.14
This was a new constituency created.
