= Second Hussein cabinet =

- 8th Cabinet of Malaysia

People and organisations
- Head of state: Tuanku Yahya Petra (1978–1979); Tuanku Ahmad Shah (1979–1981)
- Head of government: Hussein Onn
- Deputy head of government: Mahathir Mohamad
- Member parties: Barisan Nasional: United Malays National Organisation; Malaysian Chinese Association; United Sabah National Organisation; Malaysian People's Movement Party; United Traditional Bumiputera Party; Sabah People's United Front; Sarawak United Peoples' Party; Sarawak National Party; Malaysian Indian Congress
- Status in legislature: Coalition government
- Opposition parties: Democratic Action Party; Pan-Malaysian Islamic Party; Sarawak People's Organization
- Opposition leader: Lim Kit Siang

History
- Election: 1978 Malaysian general election
- Legislature term: 5th Malaysian Parliament
- Budgets: 1979, 1980, 1981
- Predecessor: First Hussein cabinet
- Successor: First Mahathir cabinet

Hussein Onn formed the second Hussein cabinet after being invited by Tuanku Yahya Petra to begin a new government following the 8 July 1978 general election in Malaysia. Prior to the election, Hussein led (as Prime Minister) the first Hussein cabinet, a coalition government that consisted of members of the component parties of Barisan Nasional. It was the 8th cabinet of Malaysia formed since independence.

This is a list of the members of the second cabinet of the third Prime Minister of Malaysia, Hussein Onn.

== Composition ==
=== Full members ===
The federal cabinet consisted of the following ministers:

Portfolio	Office bearer	Party	Constituency	Term start	Term end
Prime Minister	Hussein Onn MP	UMNO	Sri Gading		
Minister of Federal Territories	Hussein Onn MP	UMNO	Sri Gading		
Deputy Prime Minister	Mahathir Mohamad MP	UMNO	Kubang Pasu		
Minister of Commerce and Industry	Mahathir Mohamad MP	UMNO	Kubang Pasu		
Minister of Works and Public Amenities	Lee San Choon MP	MCA	Segamat	28 July 1978	15 September 1980
Minister of Works and Public Amenities	Samy Vellu MP	MIC	Sungei Siput	16 September 1980	16 July 1981
Minister of Transport	V. Manickavasagam MP	MIC	Pelabohan Kelang	1978	15 September 1979
Minister of Transport	Lee San Choon MP	MCA	Segamat	1 November 1979	16 July 1981
Minister of Law	Hamzah Abu Samah MP	UMNO	Temerloh		
Attorney General	Hamzah Abu Samah MP	UMNO	Temerloh		
Minister of Science, Technology and Environment	Ong Kee Hui MP	SUPP	Bandar Kuching		
Minister of Home Affairs	Ghazali Shafie MP	UMNO	Lipis		
Minister of Lands and Regional Development	Abdul Kadir Yusuf MP	UMNO	Tenggaroh		
Minister of General Welfare	Aishah Ghani MP	UMNO	Kuala Langat		
Minister of Defence	Abdul Taib Mahmud MP	PBB	Samarahan		
Minister of Foreign Affairs	Tengku Ahmad Rithauddeen Tengku Ismail MP	UMNO	Kota Bharu		
Minister of Housing and Local Government	Michael Chen Wing Sum MP	MCA	Ulu Selangor	1978	15 September 1979
Minister of Housing and Local Government	Neo Yee Pan MP	MCA	Muar	15 September 1979	16 July 1981
Minister of Education	Musa Hitam MP	UMNO	Labis		
Minister of Finance	Tengku Razaleigh Hamzah MP	UMNO	Ulu Kelantan		
Minister of Culture, Youth and Sports	Abdul Samad Idris MP	UMNO	Jelebu		
Minister of Health	Chong Hon Nyan MP	MCA	Batu Berendam		
Minister of Agriculture	Shariff Ahmad MP	UMNO	Jerantut		
Minister of Information	Mohamed Rahmat MP	UMNO	Pulai		
Minister of Labour and Manpower	Richard Ho Ung Hun MP	MCA	Lumut		
Minister of Primary Industries	Paul Leong Khee Seong MP	GERAKAN	Taiping		
Minister of Public Enterprises	Abdul Manan Othman MP	UMNO	Kuala Trengganu		
Minister of Energy, Telecommunications and Posts	Leo Moggie Irok MP	SNAP	Kanowit		
Minister without Portfolio	Senator Mohamed Nasir	BERJASA			

=== Deputy ministers ===
Portfolio	Office bearer	Party	Constituency	Term start	Term end
Deputy Minister in the Prime Minister's Department	Kamaruddin Mohamed Isa MP	UMNO	Larut		
Deputy Minister of Education	Chan Siang Sun MP	MCA	Bentong		
Deputy Minister of Defence	Mokhtar Hashim MP	UMNO	Tampin		
Deputy Minister of Health	Sulaiman Daud MP	PBB	Santubong		
Deputy Minister of Housing and Local Government	Ramli Omar MP	UMNO	Bagan Serai		
Deputy Minister of Transport	Goh Cheng Teik MP	GERAKAN	Nibong Tebal		
Deputy Minister of Transport	Mohd Ali M. Shariff MP	UMNO	Kuantan		
Deputy Minister of Agriculture	Edmund Langgu Saga MP	SNAP	Saratok		
Deputy Minister of Finance	Neo Yee Pan MP	MCA	Muar		
Deputy Minister of Finance	Rafidah Aziz MP	UMNO	Selayang		
Deputy Minister of Labour and Manpower	K. Pathmanaban MP	MIC	Telok Kemang		
Deputy Minister of Commerce and Industry	Lew Sip Hon MP	MCA	Shah Alam		
Deputy Minister of Education	Salleh Jafaruddin MP	PBB	Mukah		
Deputy Minister of Information	Ling Liong Sik MP	MCA	Mata Kuching		
Deputy Minister of Agriculture	Zakaria Abdul Rahman MP	UMNO	Besut		
Deputy Minister of Home Affairs	Syed Ahmad Syed Mahmud Shahabuddin MP	UMNO	Padang Terap		
Deputy Minister of Law	Abdullah Abdul Rahman MP	UMNO	Ulu Nerus		
Deputy Minister of Lands and Regional Development	Sanusi Junid MP	UMNO	Jerlun-Langkawi		
Deputy Minister of Housing and Local Government	Samy Vellu MP	MIC	Sungei Siput		
Deputy Minister of Culture, Youth and Sports	Mak Hon Kam MP	MCA	Tanjong Malim		
Deputy Minister of Energy, Telecommunications and Posts	Najib Razak MP	UMNO	Pekan		
Deputy Minister of Works and Public Amenities	Nik Hussein Wan Abdul Rahman MP	UMNO	Kuala Krai		
Deputy Minister of Science, Technology and Environment	Clarence E. Mansul MP	BERJAYA	Penampang		

== Composition before cabinet dissolution ==
=== Full members ===
Office	Incumbent	Party	Constituency		
Prime Minister	Hussein Onn MP	UMNO	Sri Gading		
Minister of Defence	Hussein Onn MP	UMNO	Sri Gading		
Deputy Prime Minister	Mahathir Mohamad MP	UMNO	Kubang Pasu		
Minister of Commerce and Industry	Mahathir Mohamad MP	UMNO	Kubang Pasu		
Minister of Transport	Lee San Choon MP	MCA	Segamat		
Minister of Science, Technology and Environment	Ong Kee Hui MP	SUPP	Bandar Kuching		
Minister of Home Affairs	Ghazali Shafie MP	UMNO	Lipis		
Minister of General Welfare	Aishah Ghani MP	UMNO	Kuala Langat		
Minister of Foreign Affairs	Tengku Ahmad Rithauddeen Tengku Ismail MP	UMNO	Kota Bharu		
Minister of Education	Musa Hitam MP	UMNO	Labis		
Minister of Finance	Tengku Razaleigh Hamzah MP	UMNO	Ulu Kelantan		
Minister of Health	Chong Hon Nyan MP	MCA	Batu Berendam		
Minister of Lands and Regional Development	Shariff Ahmad MP	UMNO	Jerantut		
Minister of Information	Mohamed Rahmat MP	UMNO	Pulai		
Minister of Labour and Manpower	Richard Ho Ung Hun MP	MCA	Lumut		
Minister of Primary Industries	Paul Leong Khee Seong MP	GERAKAN	Taiping		
Minister of Agriculture	Abdul Manan Othman MP	UMNO	Kuala Trengganu		
Minister of Energy, Telecommunications and Posts	Leo Moggie Irok MP	SNAP	Kanowit		
Minister of Housing and Local Government	Neo Yee Pan MP	MCA	Muar	15 September 1979	16 July 1981
Minister of Works and Public Amenities	Samy Vellu MP	MIC	Sungei Siput		
Minister of Culture, Youth and Sports	Mokhtar Hashim MP	UMNO	Tampin		
Minister of Public Enterprises	Rafidah Aziz MP	UMNO	Selayang		
Minister without Portfolio	Pengiran Othman Pengiran Rauf MP	BERJAYA	Kimanis		
Minister of Federal Territories	Sulaiman Daud MP	PBB	Santubong		
Minister without Portfolio	Senator Mohamed Nasir	BERJASA			

=== Deputy ministers ===
Office	Incumbent	Party	Constituency
Deputy Minister in the Prime Minister's Department	Kamaruddin Mohamed Isa MP	UMNO	Larut
Deputy Minister of Education	Chan Siang Sun MP	MCA	Bentong
Deputy Minister of Transport	Goh Cheng Teik MP	GERAKAN	Nibong Tebal
Deputy Minister of Agriculture	Edmund Langgu Saga MP	SNAP	Saratok
Deputy Minister of Labour and Manpower	K. Pathmanaban MP	MIC	Telok Kemang
Deputy Minister of Commerce and Industry	Lew Sip Hon MP	MCA	Shah Alam
Deputy Minister of Information	Ling Liong Sik MP	MCA	Mata Kuching
Deputy Minister of Housing and Local Government	Zakaria Abdul Rahman MP	UMNO	Besut
Deputy Minister in the Prime Minister's Department	Abdullah Abdul Rahman MP	UMNO	Ulu Nerus
Deputy Minister of Home Affairs	Sanusi Junid MP	UMNO	Jerlun-Langkawi
Deputy Minister of Finance	Mak Hon Kam MP	MCA	Tanjong Malim
Deputy Minister of Education	Najib Razak MP	UMNO	Pekan
Deputy Minister of Energy, Telecommunications and Posts	Nik Hussein Abdul Rahman MP	UMNO	Kuala Krai
Deputy Minister of Works and Public Amenities	Clarence E. Mansul MP	BERJAYA	Penampang
Deputy Minister of Culture, Youth and Sports	Chin Hon Ngian MP	MCA	Renggam
Deputy Minister of Information	Embong Yahya MP	UMNO	Ledang
Deputy Minister of Finance	Shahrir Abdul Samad MP	UMNO	Johor Bahru
Deputy Minister of Federal Territories	Abdullah Ahmad Badawi MP	UMNO	Kepala Batas
Deputy Minister of Defence	Abu Hassan Omar MP	UMNO	Kuala Selangor
Deputy Minister of Labour and Manpower	William Lye Chee Hien MP	BERJAYA	Gaya
Deputy Minister of Agriculture	Suhaimi Kamaruddin MP	UMNO	Sepang
Deputy Minister of Primary Industries	Bujang Ulis MP	PBB	Simunjan

== See also ==
- Members of the Dewan Rakyat, 5th Malaysian Parliament
- List of parliamentary secretaries of Malaysia § Second Hussein cabinet
