= Second Razak cabinet =

Government in Malaysia

- 6th Cabinet of Malaysia

People and organisations
- Head of state: Tuanku Abdul Halim Muadzam Shah (1974–1975); Tuanku Yahya Petra (1975–1976)
- Head of government: Abdul Razak Hussein
- Deputy head of government: Hussein Onn
- Member parties: Barisan Nasional: United Malays National Organisation; Malaysian Chinese Association; United Sabah National Organisation; Pan-Malaysian Islamic Party; Malaysian People's Movement Party; United Traditional Bumiputera Party; Malaysian Indian Congress; Sarawak United Peoples' Party; People's Progressive Party; Sabah Chinese Association
- Status in legislature: Coalition government
- Opposition parties: Democratic Action Party; Sarawak National Party; Malaysian Social Justice Party
- Opposition leaders: James Wong (1974); Edmund Langgu Saga (1974–1975); Lim Kit Siang (1975–1976)

History
- Election: 1974 Malaysian general election
- Legislature term: 4th Malaysian Parliament
- Budgets: 1975, 1976
- Predecessor: First Razak cabinet
- Successor: First Hussein cabinet

Abdul Razak Hussein formed the second Razak cabinet after being invited by Tuanku Abdul Halim Muadzam Shah to form a new government following the 24 August 1974 general elections in Malaysia. Prior to the election, Razak led (as prime minister) the first Razak cabinet, a coalition government that consisted of members of the component parties of Barisan Nasional. It was the 6th cabinet of Malaysia formed since independence.

This is a list of the members of the second cabinet of the second prime minister of Malaysia, Abdul Razak Hussein.

== Composition ==
=== Full members ===
The federal cabinet consisted of the following ministers:

Portfolio	Office bearer	Party	Constituency	Term start	Term end
Prime Minister	Abdul Razak Hussein MP	UMNO	Pekan		
Minister of Foreign Affairs	Abdul Razak Hussein MP	UMNO	Pekan		
Minister of Defence	Abdul Razak Hussein MP	UMNO	Pekan		
Deputy Prime Minister	Hussein Onn MP	UMNO	Sri Gading		
Minister of Finance	Hussein Onn MP	UMNO	Sri Gading		
Minister of Coordination of Public Corporations	Hussein Onn MP	UMNO	Sri Gading		
Minister of Agriculture and Rural Development	Abdul Ghafar Baba MP	UMNO	Alor Gajah		
Minister of Labour and Manpower	Lee San Choon MP	MCA	Segamat		
Minister of Communications	V. Manickavasagam MP	MIC	Pelabohan Kelang		
Minister of Lands and Mines	Asri Muda MP	PAS	Nilam Puri		
Minister with Special Functions	Asri Muda MP	PAS	Nilam Puri		
Minister of Commerce and Industry	Hamzah Abu Samah MP	UMNO	Temerloh		
Minister of Local Government and Environment	Ong Kee Hui MP	SUPP	Bandar Kuching		
Minister of Home Affairs	Ghazali Shafie MP	UMNO	Lipis		
Minister of Works and Transport	Abdul Ghani Gilong MP	USNO	Kinabalu		
Minister of Health	Lee Siok Yew MP	MCA	Ulu Langat		
Minister of Law	Abdul Kadir Yusuf MP	UMNO	Tenggaroh		
Attorney General	Abdul Kadir Yusuf MP	UMNO	Tenggaroh		
Minister of General Welfare	Aishah Ghani MP	UMNO	Kuala Langat		
Minister of General Planning and Sosio-Economic Research	Abdul Taib Mahmud MP	PBB	Samarahan		
Minister of Culture, Youth and Sports	Ali Ahmad MP	UMNO	Pontian		
Minister of Information	Tengku Ahmad Rithauddeen Tengku Ismail MP	UMNO	Kota Bharu		
Minister with Special Functions for Foreign Affairs	Tengku Ahmad Rithauddeen Tengku Ismail MP	UMNO	Kota Bharu		
Minister of Energy, Technology and Research	Mohamed Yaacob MP	UMNO	Tanah Merah		
Minister of Housing and New Villages	Michael Chen Wing Sum MP	MCA	Ulu Selangor		
Minister of Primary Industries	Musa Hitam MP	UMNO	Labis		
Minister of Education	Mahathir Mohamad MP	UMNO	Kubang Pasu	6 October 1974	1978

=== Deputy ministers ===
Portfolio	Office bearer	Party	Constituency	Term start	Term end
Deputy Minister of Home Affairs	Abdul Samad Idris MP	UMNO	Kuala Pilah		
Deputy Minister of Information	Shariff Ahmad MP	UMNO	Jerantut		
Deputy Minister of Communications	Wan Abdul Kadir Ismail MP	UMNO	Kemaman		
Deputy Minister of Coordination of Public Corporations	Mohamed Rahmat MP	UMNO	Pulai		
Deputy Minister of Agriculture and Rural Development	Mustapha Abdul Jabar MP	UMNO	Sabak Bernam		
Deputy Minister of Labour and Manpower	Hassan Adli Arshad MP	UMNO	Bagan Datok		
Deputy Minister of Education	Chan Siang Sun MP	MCA	Bentong		
Deputy Minister of Finance	Chong Hon Nyan MP	MCA	Batu Berendam		
Deputy Minister in the Prime Minister's Department	Abdullah Ahmad MP	UMNO	Machang		
Deputy Minister in the Prime Minister's Department	Kamaruddin Mohamed Isa MP	UMNO	Larut		
Deputy Minister of Agriculture and Rural Development	Mokhtar Hashim MP	UMNO	Tampin		
Deputy Minister of Health	Abu Bakar Umar MP	PAS	Kota Setar		
Deputy Minister of Works and Transport	Richard Ho Ung Hun MP	MCA	Lumut		
Deputy Minister of Lands and Mines	Sulaiman Daud MP	PBB	Santubong		
Deputy Minister of Primary Industries	Paul Leong Khee Seong MP	GERAKAN	Taiping		
Deputy Minister of Law	Senator Athi Nahappan	MIC			
Deputy Minister of Defence	Senator Dzulkifli Abdul Hamid	UMNO			

== Composition before cabinet dissolution ==
=== Full members ===
Office	Incumbent	Party	Constituency
Prime Minister	Abdul Razak Hussein MP	UMNO	Pekan
Minister of Defence	Abdul Razak Hussein MP	UMNO	Pekan
Deputy Prime Minister	Hussein Onn MP	UMNO	Sri Gading
Minister of Finance	Hussein Onn MP	UMNO	Sri Gading
Minister of Coordination of Public Corporations	Hussein Onn MP	UMNO	Sri Gading
Minister of Agriculture and Rural Development	Abdul Ghafar Baba MP	UMNO	Alor Gajah
Minister of Labour and Manpower	Lee San Choon MP	MCA	Segamat
Minister of Communications	V. Manickavasagam MP	MIC	Pelabohan Kelang
Minister of Lands and Mines	Asri Muda MP	PAS	Nilam Puri
Minister with Special Functions	Asri Muda MP	PAS	Nilam Puri
Minister of Commerce and Industry	Hamzah Abu Samah MP	UMNO	Temerloh
Minister of Local Government and Environment	Ong Kee Hui MP	SUPP	Bandar Kuching
Minister of Home Affairs	Ghazali Shafie MP	UMNO	Lipis
Minister of Works and Transport	Abdul Ghani Gilong MP	USNO	Kinabalu
Minister of Health	Lee Siok Yew MP	MCA	Ulu Langat
Minister of Law	Abdul Kadir Yusuf MP	UMNO	Tenggaroh
Attorney General	Abdul Kadir Yusuf MP	UMNO	Tenggaroh
Minister of General Welfare	Aishah Ghani MP	UMNO	Kuala Langat
Minister of Culture, Youth and Sports	Ali Ahmad MP	UMNO	Pontian
Minister of Foreign Affairs	Tengku Ahmad Rithauddeen Tengku Ismail MP	UMNO	Kota Bharu
Minister of Information	Abdul Taib Mahmud MP	PBB	Samarahan
Minister with Special Functions	Abdul Taib Mahmud MP	PBB	Samarahan
Minister of General Planning and Sosio-Economic Research	Abdul Taib Mahmud MP	PBB	Samarahan
Minister of Energy, Technology and Research	Mohamed Yaacob MP	UMNO	Tanah Merah
Minister of Housing and New Villages	Michael Chen Wing Sum MP	MCA	Ulu Selangor
Minister of Primary Industries	Musa Hitam MP	UMNO	Labis
Minister of Education	Mahathir Mohamad MP	UMNO	Kubang Pasu

=== Deputy ministers ===
Office	Incumbent	Party	Constituency
Deputy Minister of Home Affairs	Abdul Samad Idris MP	UMNO	Kuala Pilah
Deputy Minister of Information	Shariff Ahmad MP	UMNO	Jerantut
Deputy Minister of Communications	Wan Abdul Kadir Ismail MP	UMNO	Kemaman
Deputy Minister of Coordination of Public Corporations	Mohamed Rahmat MP	UMNO	Pulai
Deputy Minister of Agriculture and Rural Development	Mustapha Abdul Jabar MP	UMNO	Sabak Bernam
Deputy Minister of Labour and Manpower	Hassan Adli Arshad MP	UMNO	Bagan Datok
Deputy Minister in the Prime Minister's Department	Kamaruddin Mohamed Isa MP	UMNO	Larut
Deputy Minister of Education	Chan Siang Sun MP	MCA	Bentong
Deputy Minister of Finance	Chong Hon Nyan MP	MCA	Batu Berendam
Deputy Minister in the Prime Minister's Department	Abdullah Ahmad MP	UMNO	Machang
Deputy Minister of Defence	Mokhtar Hashim MP	UMNO	Tampin
Deputy Minister of Health	Abu Bakar Umar MP	PAS	Kota Setar
Deputy Minister of Works and Transport	Richard Ho Ung Hun MP	MCA	Lumut
Deputy Minister of Lands and Mines	Sulaiman Daud MP	PBB	Santubong
Deputy Minister of Primary Industries	Paul Leong Khee Seong MP	GERAKAN	Taiping
Deputy Minister of Law	Senator Athi Nahappan	MIC	

== See also ==
- Members of the Dewan Rakyat, 4th Malaysian Parliament
- List of parliamentary secretaries of Malaysia#Second Razak cabinet
