= First Hussein cabinet =

- 7th Cabinet of Malaysia

People and organisations
- Head of state: Tuanku Yahya Petra
- Head of government: Hussein Onn
- Deputy head of government: Mahathir Mohamad
- Member parties: Barisan Nasional: United Malays National Organisation; Malaysian Chinese Association; United Sabah National Organisation; Pan-Malaysian Islamic Party (until December 1977); Sarawak National Party; Malaysian People's Movement Party; United Traditional Bumiputera Party; Sarawak United Peoples' Party; Malaysian Indian Congress; People's Progressive Party; Sabah Chinese Association
- Status in legislature: Coalition government
- Opposition parties: Democratic Action Party; Malaysian Social Justice Party; Pan-Malaysian Islamic Party (from January 1978)
- Opposition leader: Lim Kit Siang

History
- Outgoing election: 1978 Malaysian general election
- Legislature term: 4th Malaysian Parliament
- Budgets: 1977, 1978
- Predecessor: Second Razak cabinet
- Successor: Second Hussein cabinet

Hussein Onn formed the first Hussein cabinet after being invited by Tuanku Yahya Petra to begin a new government following the death of the previous Prime Minister of Malaysia, Abdul Razak Hussein. Prior to his death, Razak led (as Prime Minister) the second Razak cabinet, a coalition government that consisted of members of the component parties of Barisan Nasional. It was the 7th cabinet of Malaysia formed since independence.

A reshuffle of the cabinet was done on 31 December 1977, due to Parti Islam Se-Malaysia's expulsion from Barisan Nasional, resignation of Health Minister Lee Siok Yew, and the death of Minister of Agriculture Ali Ahmad from the plane crash at Tanjung Kupang.

This is a list of the members of the first cabinet of the third Prime Minister of Malaysia, Hussein Onn.

== Composition ==
=== Full members ===
The federal cabinet consisted of the following ministers:

Portfolio	Office bearer	Party	Constituency	Term start	Term end
Prime Minister	Hussein Onn MP	UMNO	Sri Gading	15 January 1976	1978
Minister of Defence	Hussein Onn MP	UMNO	Sri Gading	15 January 1976	1978
Deputy Prime Minister	Mahathir Mohamad MP	UMNO	Kubang Pasu	5 March 1976	1978
Minister of Education	Mahathir Mohamad MP	UMNO	Kubang Pasu	1976	1 January 1978
Minister of Education	Musa Hitam MP	UMNO	Labis		
Minister of Labour and Manpower	Lee San Choon MP	MCA	Segamat		
Minister of Communications	V. Manickavasagam MP	MIC	Pelabohan Kelang		
Minister of Lands and Regional Development	Asri Muda MP	PAS	Nilam Puri		
Minister of Commerce and Industry	Hamzah Abu Samah MP	UMNO	Temerloh		
Minister of Science, Technology and Environment	Ong Kee Hui MP	SUPP	Bandar Kuching		
Minister of Home Affairs	Ghazali Shafie MP	UMNO	Lipis	1976	1978
Minister of Works and Public Amenities	Abdul Ghani Gilong MP	USNO	Kinabalu		
Minister of Health	Lee Siok Yew MP	MCA	Ulu Langat		
Minister of Law	Abdul Kadir Yusuf MP	UMNO	Tenggaroh		
Attorney General	Abdul Kadir Yusuf MP	UMNO	Tenggaroh		
Minister of General Welfare	Aishah Ghani MP	UMNO	Kuala Langat		
Minister of Information	Abdul Taib Mahmud MP	PBB	Samarahan		
Minister of Culture, Youth and Sports	Ali Ahmad MP	UMNO	Pontian	1976	4 December 1977
Minister of Foreign Affairs	Tengku Ahmad Rithauddeen Tengku Ismail MP	UMNO	Kota Bharu		
Minister of Public Enterprises	Mohamed Yaacob MP	UMNO	Tanah Merah		
Minister of Housing and Villages Development	Michael Chen Wing Sum MP	MCA	Ulu Selangor		
Minister of Primary Industries	Musa Hitam MP	UMNO	Labis		
Minister of Finance	Tengku Razaleigh Hamzah MP	UMNO	Ulu Kelantan		
Minister without Portfolio	Abdul Samad Idris MP	UMNO	Kuala Pilah		
Minister of Local Government and Federal Territories	Hassan Adli Arshad MP	UMNO	Bagan Datok		
Minister without Portfolio	Chong Hon Nyan MP	MCA	Batu Berendam		

=== Deputy ministers ===
Portfolio	Office bearer	Party	Constituency	Term start	Term end
Deputy Minister of Home Affairs	Shariff Ahmad MP	UMNO	Jerantut		
Deputy Minister of Commerce and Industry	Mohamed Rahmat MP	UMNO	Pulai		
Deputy Minister of Agriculture	Mustapha Abdul Jabar MP	UMNO	Sabak Bernam		
Deputy Minister in the Prime Minister's Department	Kamaruddin Mohamed Isa MP	UMNO	Larut		
Deputy Minister of Education	Chan Siang Sun MP	MCA	Bentong		
Deputy Minister of Science, Technology and Environment	Abdullah Ahmad MP	UMNO	Machang		
Deputy Minister of Defence	Mokhtar Hashim MP	UMNO	Tampin		
Deputy Minister of Health	Abu Bakar Umar MP	PAS	Kota Setar		
Deputy Minister of Finance	Richard Ho Ung Hun MP	MCA	Lumut	1976	31 December 1976
Deputy Minister of Finance	Neo Yee Pan MP	MCA	Muar	1 January 1977	1978
Deputy Minister of Lands and Regional Development	Sulaiman Daud MP	PBB	Santubong		
Deputy Minister of Primary Industries	Paul Leong Khee Seong MP	GERAKAN	Taiping		
Deputy Minister of Housing and Villages Development	Ramli Omar MP	UMNO	Bagan Serai		
Deputy Minister of Labour and Manpower	Abdullah Majid MP	UMNO	Raub		
Deputy Minister of Works and Public Amenities	Goh Cheng Teik MP	GERAKAN	Nibong Tebal		
Deputy Minister of Culture, Youth and Sports	Neo Yee Pan MP	MCA	Muar	March 1976	31 December 1976
Deputy Minister of Communications	Mohd Ali M. Shariff MP	UMNO	Kuantan		
Deputy Minister of Law	Rais Yatim MP	UMNO	Jelebu		
Deputy Minister of Law	Senator Athi Nahappan	MIC			

== Composition before cabinet dissolution ==
=== Full members ===
Office	Incumbent	Party	Constituency
Prime Minister	Hussein Onn MP	UMNO	Sri Gading
Minister of Defence	Hussein Onn MP	UMNO	Sri Gading
Deputy Prime Minister	Mahathir Mohamad MP	UMNO	Kubang Pasu
Minister of Commerce and Industry	Mahathir Mohamad MP	UMNO	Kubang Pasu
Minister of Labour and Manpower	Lee San Choon MP	MCA	Segamat
Minister of Communications	V. Manickavasagam MP	MIC	Pelabohan Kelang
Minister of Law	Hamzah Abu Samah MP	UMNO	Temerloh
Minister of Science, Technology and Environment	Ong Kee Hui MP	SUPP	Bandar Kuching
Minister of Home Affairs	Ghazali Shafie MP	UMNO	Lipis
Minister of Works and Public Amenities	Abdul Ghani Gilong MP	USNO	Kinabalu
Minister of Lands and Regional Development	Abdul Kadir Yusuf MP	UMNO	Tenggaroh
Minister of General Welfare	Aishah Ghani MP	UMNO	Kuala Langat
Minister of Primary Industries	Abdul Taib Mahmud MP	PBB	Samarahan
Minister of Foreign Affairs	Tengku Ahmad Rithauddeen Tengku Ismail MP	UMNO	Kota Bharu
Minister of Housing and Villages Development	Michael Chen Wing Sum MP	MCA	Ulu Selangor
Minister of Education	Musa Hitam MP	UMNO	Labis
Minister of Finance	Tengku Razaleigh Hamzah MP	UMNO	Ulu Kelantan
Minister of Culture, Youth and Sports	Abdul Samad Idris MP	UMNO	Kuala Pilah
Minister of Local Government and Federal Territories	Hassan Adli Arshad MP	UMNO	Bagan Datok
Minister of Health	Chong Hon Nyan MP	MCA	Batu Berendam
Minister of Agriculture	Shariff Ahmad MP	UMNO	Jerantut
Minister of Information	Mohamed Rahmat MP	UMNO	Pulai
Minister without Portfolio	Richard Ho Ung Hun MP	MCA	Lumut
Minister of Public Enterprises	Senator Mohamed Nasir	BERJASA	

=== Deputy ministers ===
Office	Incumbent	Party	Constituency
Deputy Minister of Public Enterprises	Mustapha Abdul Jabar MP	UMNO	Sabak Bernam
Deputy Minister in the Prime Minister's Department	Kamaruddin Mohamed Isa MP	UMNO	Larut
Deputy Minister of Education	Chan Siang Sun MP	MCA	Bentong
Deputy Minister of Defence	Mokhtar Hashim MP	UMNO	Tampin
Deputy Minister of Health	Sulaiman Daud MP	PBB	Santubong
Deputy Minister of Primary Industries	Paul Leong Khee Seong MP	GERAKAN	Taiping
Deputy Minister of Housing and Villages Development	Ramli Omar MP	UMNO	Bagan Serai
Deputy Minister of Works and Public Amenities	Goh Cheng Teik MP	GERAKAN	Nibong Tebal
Deputy Minister of Finance	Neo Yee Pan MP	MCA	Muar
Deputy Minister of Finance	Senator Rafidah Aziz	UMNO	
Deputy Minister of Communications	Mohd Ali M. Shariff MP	UMNO	Kuantan
Deputy Minister of Home Affairs	Rais Yatim MP	UMNO	Jelebu
Deputy Minister of Local Government and Federal Territories	Subramaniam Sinniah MP	MIC	Damansara
Deputy Minister of Agriculture	Edmund Langgu Saga MP	SNAP	Saratok
Deputy Minister of Labour and Manpower	K. Pathmanaban MP	MIC	Telok Kemang
Deputy Minister of Commerce and Industry	Lew Sip Hon MP	MCA	Shah Alam
Deputy Minister of Commerce and Industry	Abdul Manan Othman MP	UMNO	Kemaman
Deputy Minister of Information	Ling Liong Sik MP	MCA	Mata Kuching
Deputy Minister of Information	Senator Othman Abdullah	UMNO	
Deputy Minister of Education	Senator Salleh Jafaruddin	PBB	

== See also ==
- Members of the Dewan Rakyat, 4th Malaysian Parliament
- List of parliamentary secretaries of Malaysia § First Hussein cabinet
