= First Razak cabinet =

- 5th Cabinet of Malaysia

People and organisations
- Head of state: Abdul Halim
- Head of government: Abdul Razak Hussein
- Deputy head of government: Ismail Abdul Rahman (1970–1973); Hussein Onn (1973–1974)
- Member parties: Alliance Party (1970–1973): United Malays National Organisation; Malaysian Chinese Association; Parti Bumiputera Sarawak; Malaysian Indian Congress; Sarawak Chinese Association; Malaysian People's Movement Party (from 1972); Barisan Nasional (1973–1974): United Malays National Organisation; Malaysian Chinese Association; United Sabah National Organisation; Pan-Malaysian Islamic Party; Malaysian People's Movement Party; United Traditional Bumiputera Party; Sarawak United Peoples' Party; People's Progressive Party; Sabah Chinese Association; Malaysian Indian Congress; Sarawak Chinese Association
- Status in legislature: Coalition government
- Opposition parties: Until 1974; Democratic Action Party; Sarawak National Party; Malaysian Social Justice Party; Until 1973; United Sabah National Organisation; Pan-Malayan Islamic Party; Malaysian People's Movement Party; Sarawak United Peoples' Party; People's Progressive Party; Sabah Chinese Association; Parti Pesaka Sarawak
- Opposition leaders: Vacant (1970–1971); Asri Muda (1971–1973); Lim Kit Siang (1973–1974)

History
- Outgoing election: 1974 Malaysian general election
- Legislature term: 3rd Malaysian Parliament
- Budgets: 1971, 1972, 1973, 1974
- Predecessor: Fourth Rahman cabinet
- Successor: Second Razak cabinet

Abdul Razak Hussein formed the first Razak cabinet after being invited by Tuanku Abdul Halim Muadzam Shah to begin a new government following the resignation of the previous prime minister of Malaysia, Tunku Abdul Rahman. Prior to the resignation, Rahman led (as prime minister) the third Rahman cabinet, a coalition government that consisted of members of the component parties of Alliance Party. It was the 5th cabinet of Malaysia formed since independence.

This is a list of the members of the first cabinet of the second prime minister of Malaysia, Abdul Razak Hussein.

== Composition ==
=== Full members ===
The federal cabinet consisted of the following ministers:

Portfolio	Office bearer	Party	Constituency	Term start	Term end
Prime Minister	Abdul Razak Hussein MP	UMNO	Pekan		
Minister of Foreign Affairs	Abdul Razak Hussein MP	UMNO	Pekan		
Minister of Defence	Abdul Razak Hussein MP	UMNO	Pekan		
Deputy Prime Minister	Ismail Abdul Rahman MP	UMNO	Johore Timor		
Minister of Home Affairs	Ismail Abdul Rahman MP	UMNO	Johore Timor		
Minister of Finance	Tan Siew Sin MP	MCA	Malacca Tengah		
Minister of Works, Posts and Telecommunications	V. T. Sambanthan MP	MIC	Sungei Siput		
Minister of Health	Sardon Jubir MP	UMNO	Pontian Utara		
Minister of Commerce and Industry	Khir Johari MP	UMNO	Kedah Tengah		
Minister of Sarawak Affairs	Jugah Barieng MP	PESAKA	Ulu Rajang		
Minister of Labour	V. Manickavasagam MP	MIC	Klang		
Minister of Agriculture and Lands	Mohamed Ghazali Jawi MP	UMNO	Kuala Kangsar		
Minister of National and Rural Development	Abdul Ghafar Baba MP	UMNO	Malacca Utara		
Minister of Transport	Abdul Ghani Gilong MP	USNO	Kinabalu		
Minister without Portfolio	Lee Siok Yew MP	MCA	Sepang		
Minister of Culture, Youth and Sports	Hamzah Abu Samah MP	UMNO	Raub		
Minister of Social Welfare	Fatimah Hashim MP	UMNO	Jitra-Padang Terap		
Minister of Education	Hussein Onn MP	UMNO	Johore Bahru Timor		
Minister of Technology, Research and Local Government	Ong Kee Hui MP	SUPP	Bandar Kuching		
Minister of Information	Senator Ghazali Shafie	UMNO			
Minister with Special Functions	Senator Ghazali Shafie	UMNO			
Minister without Portfolio	Senator Ong Yoke Lin	MCA			

=== Assistant ministers ===
Portfolio	Office bearer	Party	Constituency	Term start	Term end
Assistant Minister in the Prime Minister's Department	Abdul Taib Mahmud MP	BUMIPUTERA	Samarahan		
Assistant Minister of Finance	Ali Ahmad MP	UMNO	Pontian Selatan		
Assistant Minister of National and Rural Development	Abdul Samad Idris MP	UMNO	Kuala Pilah		
Assistant Minister of Labour	Lee San Choon MP	MCA	Segamat Selatan		
Assistant Minister of Defence	Tengku Ahmad Rithauddeen Tengku Ismail MP	UMNO	Kota Bharu Hilir		
Assistant Minister of Home Affairs	Mohamed Yaacob MP	UMNO	Tanah Merah		

== Composition before cabinet dissolution ==
=== Full members ===
Office	Incumbent	Party	Constituency
Prime Minister	Abdul Razak Hussein MP	UMNO	Pekan
Minister of Foreign Affairs	Abdul Razak Hussein MP	UMNO	Pekan
Minister of Finance	Abdul Razak Hussein MP	UMNO	Pekan
Deputy Prime Minister	Hussein Onn MP	UMNO	Johore Bahru Timor
Minister of Commerce and Industry	Hussein Onn MP	UMNO	Johore Bahru Timor
Minister of National Unity	V. T. Sambanthan MP	MIC	Sungei Siput
Minister of Communications	Sardon Jubir MP	UMNO	Pontian Utara
Minister without Portfolio	Khir Johari MP	UMNO	Kedah Tengah
Minister of Sarawak Affairs	Jugah Barieng MP	PBB	Ulu Rajang
Minister of Labour and Manpower	V. Manickavasagam MP	MIC	Klang
Minister of Agriculture and Fisheries	Mohamed Ghazali Jawi MP	UMNO	Kuala Kangsar
Minister of Rural Economy Development	Abdul Ghafar Baba MP	UMNO	Malacca Utara
Minister of Works and Energy	Abdul Ghani Gilong MP	USNO	Kinabalu
Minister of Health	Lee Siok Yew MP	MCA	Sepang
Minister of Lands Development	Asri Muda MP	PAS	Kota Bharu Hulu
Minister with Special Functions	Asri Muda MP	PAS	Kota Bharu Hulu
Minister of Defence	Hamzah Abu Samah MP	UMNO	Raub
Minister of Home Affairs	Ghazali Shafie MP	UMNO	Lipis
Minister of Local Government and Housing	Ong Kee Hui MP	SUPP	Bandar Kuching
Minister of Primary Industries	Abdul Taib Mahmud MP	PBB	Samarahan
Minister of Technology, Research and Coordination of New Villages	Lee San Choon MP	MCA	Segamat Selatan
Minister of Culture, Youth and Sports	Ali Ahmad MP	UMNO	Pontian Selatan
Minister of Information	Tengku Ahmad Rithauddeen Tengku Ismail MP	UMNO	Kota Bharu Hilir
Minister with Special Functions	Tengku Ahmad Rithauddeen Tengku Ismail MP	UMNO	Kota Bharu Hilir
Minister of Education	Mohamed Yaacob MP	UMNO	Tanah Merah
Minister with Special Functions	Michael Chen Wing Sum MP	MCA	Ulu Selangor
Minister of General Welfare	Senator Aishah Ghani	UMNO	

=== Deputy ministers ===
Office	Incumbent	Party	Constituency
Deputy Minister of Home Affairs	Abdul Samad Idris MP	UMNO	Kuala Pilah
Deputy Minister of Commerce and Industry	Musa Hitam MP	UMNO	Segamat Utara
Deputy Minister of Information	Shariff Ahmad MP	UMNO	Langat
Deputy Minister in the Prime Minister's Department	Wan Abdul Kadir Ismail MP	UMNO	Kuala Trengganu Utara
Deputy Minister of Finance	Mohamed Rahmat MP	UMNO	Johore Bahru Barat
Deputy Minister of Communications	Senator Wong Seng Chow	MCA	
Deputy Minister of Primary Industries	Yusof Rawa MP	PAS	Kota Star Selatan

=== Assistant ministers ===
Portfolio	Office Bearer	Party	Constituency	Term start	Term end
Assistant Minister in the Prime Minister's Department	Abdul Taib Mahmud MP	BUMIPUTERA	Samarahan		
Assistant Minister of Finance	Ali Ahmad MP	UMNO	Pontian Selatan		
Assistant Minister of National and Rural Development	Abdul Samad Idris MP	UMNO	Kuala Pilah		
Assistant Minister of Labour	Lee San Choon MP	MCA	Segamat Selatan		
Assistant Minister of Defence	Tengku Ahmad Rithauddeen Tengku Ismail MP	UMNO	Kota Bharu Hilir		
Assistant Minister of Home Affairs	Mohamed Yaacob MP	UMNO	Tanah Merah		

== Composition before cabinet dissolution ==
=== Full members ===
Office	Incumbent	Party	Constituency
Prime Minister	Abdul Razak Hussein MP	UMNO	Pekan
Minister of Foreign Affairs	Abdul Razak Hussein MP	UMNO	Pekan
Minister of Finance	Abdul Razak Hussein MP	UMNO	Pekan
Deputy Prime Minister	Hussein Onn MP	UMNO	Johore Bahru Timor
Minister of Commerce and Industry	Hussein Onn MP	UMNO	Johore Bahru Timor
Minister of National Unity	V. T. Sambanthan MP	MIC	Sungei Siput
Minister of Communications	Sardon Jubir MP	UMNO	Pontian Utara
Minister without Portfolio	Khir Johari MP	UMNO	Kedah Tengah
Minister of Sarawak Affairs	Jugah Barieng MP	PBB	Ulu Rajang
Minister of Labour and Manpower	V. Manickavasagam MP	MIC	Klang
Minister of Agriculture and Fisheries	Mohamed Ghazali Jawi MP	UMNO	Kuala Kangsar
Minister of Rural Economy Development	Abdul Ghafar Baba MP	UMNO	Malacca Utara
Minister of Works and Energy	Abdul Ghani Gilong MP	USNO	Kinabalu
Minister of Health	Lee Siok Yew MP	MCA	Sepang
Minister of Lands Development	Asri Muda MP	PAS	Kota Bharu Hulu
Minister with Special Functions	Asri Muda MP	PAS	Kota Bharu Hulu
Minister of Defence	Hamzah Abu Samah MP	UMNO	Raub
Minister of Home Affairs	Ghazali Shafie MP	UMNO	Lipis
Minister of Local Government and Housing	Ong Kee Hui MP	SUPP	Bandar Kuching
Minister of Primary Industries	Abdul Taib Mahmud MP	PBB	Samarahan
Minister of Technology, Research and Coordination of New Villages	Lee San Choon MP	MCA	Segamat Selatan
Minister of Culture, Youth and Sports	Ali Ahmad MP	UMNO	Pontian Selatan
Minister of Information	Tengku Ahmad Rithauddeen Tengku Ismail MP	UMNO	Kota Bharu Hilir
Minister with Special Functions	Tengku Ahmad Rithauddeen Tengku Ismail MP	UMNO	Kota Bharu Hilir
Minister of Education	Mohamed Yaacob MP	UMNO	Tanah Merah
Minister with Special Functions	Michael Chen Wing Sum MP	MCA	Ulu Selangor
Minister of General Welfare	Senator Aishah Ghani	UMNO	

=== Deputy ministers ===
Office	Incumbent	Party	Constituency
Deputy Minister of Home Affairs	Abdul Samad Idris MP	UMNO	Kuala Pilah
Deputy Minister of Commerce and Industry	Musa Hitam MP	UMNO	Segamat Utara
Deputy Minister of Information	Shariff Ahmad MP	UMNO	Langat
Deputy Minister in the Prime Minister's Department	Wan Abdul Kadir Ismail MP	UMNO	Kuala Trengganu Utara
Deputy Minister of Finance	Mohamed Rahmat MP	UMNO	Johore Bahru Barat
Deputy Minister of Communications	Senator Wong Seng Chow	MCA	
Deputy Minister of Primary Industries	Yusof Rawa MP	PAS	Kota Star Selatan

== See also ==
- Members of the Dewan Rakyat, 3rd Malaysian Parliament
- List of parliamentary secretaries of Malaysia#First Razak cabinet
