= Razak Cabinet =

Razak Cabinet is the name of either of two cabinets of Malaysia:

- Cabinet Razak I (1970–1974)
- Cabinet Razak II (1974–1976)
