= Hussein Cabinet =

Hussein Cabinet is either the name of two cabinets of Malaysia or two cabinets of Syria.

== Malaysia ==
- Cabinet Hussein I (1976–1978)
- Cabinet Hussein II (1978–1981)

== Syria ==
- First Hussein Arnous cabinet (2020–2021)
- Second Hussein Arnous cabinet (2021–present)
