= Ali Ahmad (politician) =

Malaysian politician

Yang Berhormat (Note: The prefix "Yang Berhormat" is used for recipients of the First and Second Classes of the Johor's Orders of Chivalry.) Dato' Ali Ahmad SPMJ SSIJ SMJ PPM

Minister of Agriculture and Rural Development
- In office 1976–1977
- Monarch: Yahya Petra
- Prime Minister: Hussein Onn
- Preceded by: Abdul Ghafar Baba
- Succeeded by: Shariff Ahmad
- Constituency: Pontian

Member of the Malaysian Parliament for Pontian, Johor
- In office 1974–1977
- Preceded by: New constintuency
- Succeeded by: Ikhwan Nasir

Minister of Culture, Youth and Sports
- In office 1973–1976
- Monarchs: Abdul Halim; Yahya Petra
- Prime Minister: Abdul Razak Hussein; Hussein Onn
- Preceded by: Hamzah Abu Samah
- Succeeded by: Abdul Samad Idris
- Constituency: Pontian Selatan (until 1974); Pontian (from 1974)

Deputy Minister of Home Affairs
- In office January 1973 – August 1973
- Monarch: Abdul Halim
- Prime Minister: Abdul Razak Hussein
- Minister: Ismail Abdul Rahman
- Constituency: Pontian Selatan

Assistant/Deputy Minister of Finance
- In office 1969–1972
- Monarchs: Ismail Nasiruddin; Abdul Halim
- Prime Minister: Tunku Abdul Rahman; Abdul Razak Hussein
- Minister: Tan Siew Sin
- Constituency: Pontian Selatan

Parliamentary Secretary to Minister of Finance
- In office 1965–1969
- Monarch: Ismail Nasiruddin
- Prime Minister: Tunku Abdul Rahman
- Minister: Tan Siew Sin
- Constituency: Pontian Selatan

Member of the Malaysian Parliament for Pontian Selatan
- In office 1964–1974
- Preceded by: Zainon Munshi Sulaiman
- Succeeded by: Constintuency abolished

Personal details
- Born: 29 June 1930 Kampung Parit Rambai, Rambah, Pontian, Johor
- Died: 4 December 1977 (aged 47) Tanjung Kupang, Johor
- Cause of death: Killed in Malaysian Airline System Flight 653 plane crash
- Party: United Malays National Organisation (UMNO)
- Other party: Barisan Nasional (BN); Alliance
- Spouse: Datin Halimah Abdul Rahim
- Children: 5
- Occupation: Politician

Ali bin Ahmad (29 June 1930 – 4 December 1977) was a Malaysian politician.

== Political career ==
Ali was first elected to Parliament when he won the Pontian Selatan seat in the 1964 Malaysian general election under the Alliance ticket, a seat he successfully defended in the 1969 Malaysian general election unopposed.

Ali was the UMNO Division chief of Pontian after Pontian Selatan and Pontian Utara Parliamentary seat were merged before 1974 Malaysian general election. In the election, he won the newly created seat, Pontian by a walkover.

Ali was first appointed as Parliamentary Secretary to the then finance minister, Tan Siew Sin in 1964, in the third Tunku Abdul Rahman cabinet and was one of the young office-holders of the said position at only 34 years of age. He continued as assistant to Tan Siew Sin in the final cabinet of Tunku Abdul Rahman in 1969 and was promoted to Deputy Finance Minister in the first cabinet of Tun Abdul Razak. He then switched his portfolio as Deputy Minister of Home Affairs in the January 1973 cabinet reshuffle with fellow UMNO politician, Mohamed Yaacob, after the admittance of Malaysian Islamic Party in the Alliance-led government. In another Cabinet reshuffle on August the same year after the death of Deputy Prime Minister and Minister of Home Affairs Ismail Abdul Rahman, he was appointed as Minister of Culture, Youth and Sports, a post he retains in the 1974 Razak cabinet after the 1974 election. He holds this position until 1976, when his portfolio was changed to Minister of Agriculture and Rural Development under the new prime minister Hussein Onn's cabinet, his final position in the government.

== Personal life ==
He was married to Datin Halimah Abdul Rahim, with 5 daughters.

== Death and legacy ==
On 4 December 1977, while he was still Minister of Agriculture and Rural Development, he was one of the passengers killed in Malaysian Airline System Flight 653 plane crash at Tanjung Kupang, along with his press secretary Hood Fadzil. Ali was 47 years old. He was returning to Kuala Lumpur after a visit to Perlis.

Parliament's Dewan Rakyat on the next day observed a minute silence before the start of meeting as a sign of respect of Ali and others who perished in the tragedy.

The remains of Ali was buried, along with remains of other victims of the crash, in a common burial site at Jalan Kebun Teh, Johor Bahru.

Sekolah Menengah Kebangsaan Dato` Ali Hj Ahmad, a secondary school in Pontian, Johor, is named after him.

== Election results ==
Parliament of Malaysia
Year	Constituency	Candidate	Votes	Pct	Opponent(s)	Votes	Pct	Ballots cast	Majority	Turnout
1964	P098 Pontian Selatan	Ali Ahmad (UMNO)	13,759	69.95%	Tan Tai Chee (LPM)	5,910	30.05%	20,234	7,849	82.36%
1969	P098 Pontian Selatan	Ali Ahmad (UMNO)	Unopposed							
1974	P112 Pontian	Ali Ahmad (UMNO)	Unopposed							

== Honours ==
- Malaysia
  - Recipient of the Malaysian Commemorative Medal (Silver) (PPM) (1965)
- Johor
  - Companion of the Order of the Crown of Johor (SMJ) (1972)
  - Knight Grand Commander of the Order of the Crown of Johor (SPMJ) – Dato' (1973)
  - Knight Grand Companion of the Order of Loyalty of Sultan Ismail of Johor (SSIJ) – Dato' (1977)
