= Prime Minister of Malaysia =

Head of government

- Perdana Menteri Malaysia ڤردان منتري مليسيا
- Coat of arms of Malaysia

- Emblem of the Prime Minister's Office

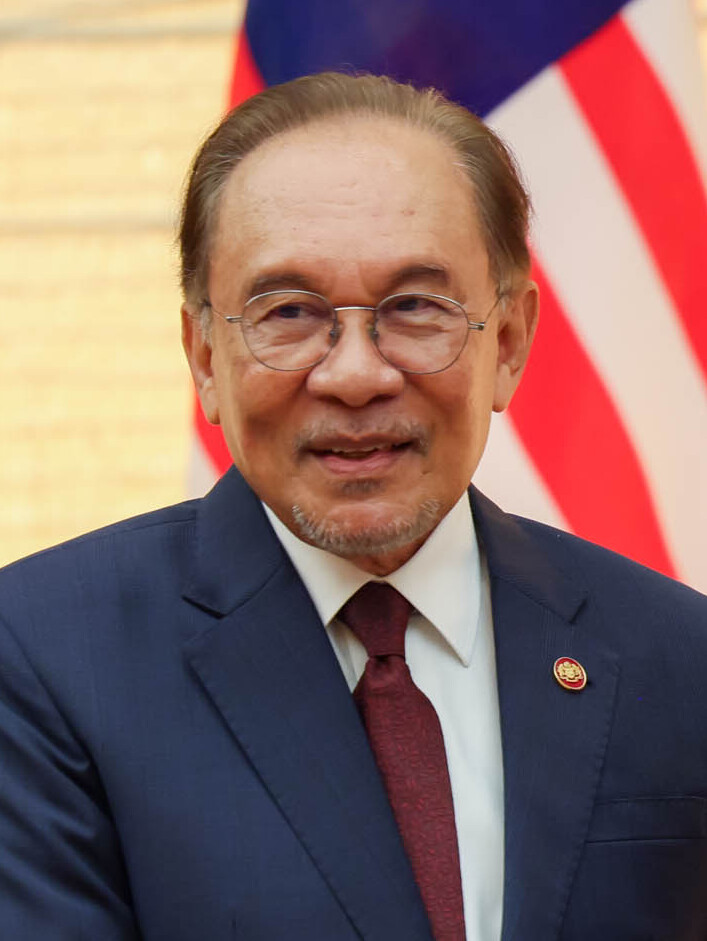
- Incumbent; Anwar Ibrahim since 24 November 2022
- Government of Malaysia; Prime Minister's Department
- Style: Prime Minister (informal); Yang Amat Berhormat (formal); The Right Honourable (within the Commonwealth); His Excellency (diplomatic)
- Type: Head of government
- Member of: Cabinet; Prime Minister's Department; National Finance Council; National Security Council; House of Representatives
- Reports to: Parliament
- Residence: Seri Perdana, Putrajaya
- Seat: Perdana Putra, Putrajaya
- Appointer: King of Malaysia
- Constituting instrument: Constitution of Malaysia
- Inaugural holder: Tunku Abdul Rahman
- Formation: 31 August 1957; 69 years ago
- Deputy: Deputy Prime Minister
- Salary: RM22,826.65/US$ 5,106 per month
- Website: www.pmo.gov.my

The prime minister of Malaysia (Malay: Perdana Menteri Malaysia; Jawi: ڤردان منتري مليسيا) is the head of government of Malaysia. The prime minister directs the executive branch of the federal government. The King of Malaysia appoints the prime minister who is a member of Parliament (MP) who, in his opinion, is most likely to command the confidence of a majority of MPs. The prime minister is usually the leader of the party winning the most seats in a general election.

After the formation of Malaysia on 16 September 1963, Tunku Abdul Rahman, whom was the chief minister of the Federation of Malaya at the time, became the first prime minister of Malaysia.

The current prime minister is Anwar Ibrahim, who was elected in the 15th general election.

== Appointment ==
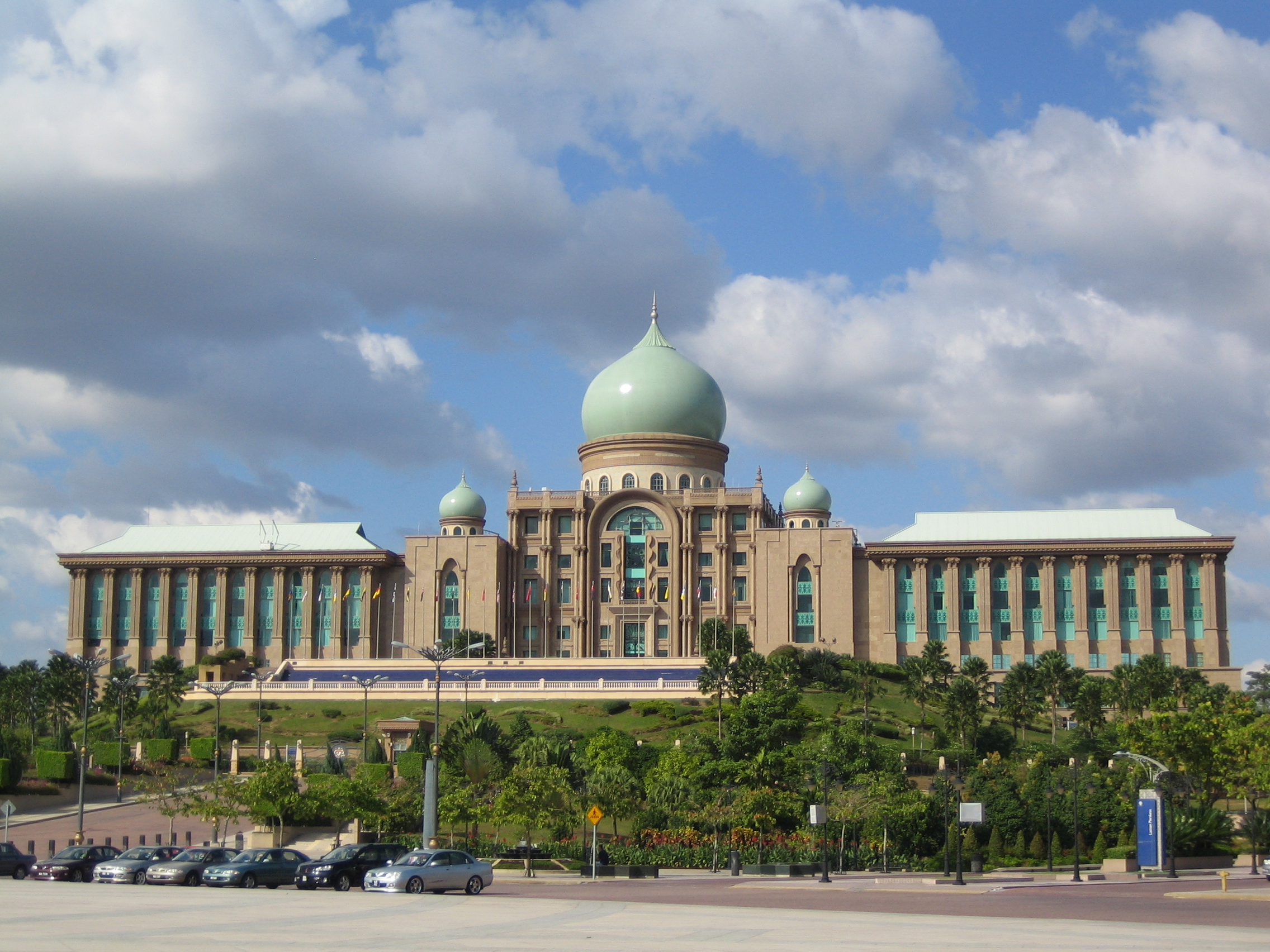
The prime minister's office at Perdana Putra, Putrajaya, Malaysia.

According to the Federal Constitution, the Yang di-Pertuan Agong shall first appoint a prime minister to preside over the Cabinet. The prime minister is to be a member of the Dewan Rakyat (House of Representatives), and must have the confidence of the majority of the members of that House. This person must be a Malaysian citizen, but cannot have obtained their citizenship by means of naturalisation or registration. The Yang di-Pertuan Agong shall appoint other ministers from either the Dewan Rakyat or Dewan Negara (Senate) with the prime minister's advice.

The prime minister and their cabinet ministers must take and subscribe to the oath of office and allegiance as well as the oath of secrecy in the presence of the Yang di-Pertuan Agong before they can exercise functions of office. The Cabinet is collectively accountable to the Parliament of Malaysia. The members of the Cabinet shall not hold any office of profit and engage in any trade, business or profession that will cause a conflict of interest. The Prime Minister's Department (sometimes referred to as the Prime Minister's Office) is the body and ministry in which the prime minister exercises their functions and powers.

In the case where a government cannot get its appropriation (budget) legislation passed by the House of Representatives, or when the House passes a no confidence vote in the government, the prime minister is bound by convention to resign immediately. The Yang di-Pertuan Agong's choice of replacement prime minister will be dictated by the circumstances. All other ministers shall continue to hold office by the pleasure of the Yang di-Pertuan Agong, unless if the appointment of any minister is revoked by their majesty upon the advice of the prime minister. Any minister may resign their office.

Following a resignation in other circumstances, defeat in an election, or the death of a prime minister, the Yang di-Pertuan Agong would generally appoint as the new leader of the governing party or coalition as new prime minister.

Malaysia uses a first-past-the-post-voting system, which means a party or coalition will lead a government if they manage to gain 112 seats in the Dewan Rakyat.

== Powers ==
The power of the prime minister is subject to a number of limitations. Prime ministers removed as leader of their party, or whose government loses a vote of no confidence in the House of Representatives, must advise a new election of the lower house or resign the office. The defeat of a supply bill (one that concerns the spending of money) or unable to pass important policy-related legislation is seen to require the resignation of the government or dissolution of Parliament, much like a non-confidence vote, since a government that cannot spend money is hamstrung, also called loss of supply.

The prime minister's party will normally have a majority in the House of Representatives and party discipline is exceptionally strong in Malaysian politics, so passage of the government's legislation through the House of Representatives is mostly a formality.

Under the Constitution, the prime minister's role includes advising the Yang di-Pertuan Agong on:

- the appointment of the federal ministers (full members of cabinet)
- the appointment of the federal deputy ministers, parliamentary secretaries (non-full members of cabinet)
- the appointment of 44 out of 70 senators in the Dewan Negara
- the summoning and adjournment of sittings of the Dewan Rakyat
- the appointment of judges of the superior courts (which are the High Courts, the Court of Appeal, and the Federal Court)
- the appointment of the attorney-general and the auditor-general
- the appointment of the chairmen and members of the Judicial and Legal Service Commission, Election Commission, Police Force Commission, Education Service Commission, National Finance Council, and Armed Forces Council

Under Article 39 of the Constitution, executive authority is vested in the Yang di-Pertuan Agong. However, Article 40(1) states that in most cases, the Yang di-Pertuan Agong is bound to exercise his powers on the advice of the Cabinet or a minister acting under the Cabinet's general authority. Thus, in practice, actual governing authority is vested in the prime minister and Cabinet.

=== Acting prime minister ===
From time to time, prime ministers are required to leave the country on business and a deputy is appointed to take their place during that time. In the days before jet aeroplanes, such absences could be for extended periods. However, the position can be fully decided by the Yang di-Pertuan Agong, the King of Malaysia when the position remains empty following the sudden resignation or death of the prime minister.

=== Caretaker prime minister ===
Under Article 55(3) of Constitution of Malaysia, the lower house of Parliament, unless sooner dissolved by the Yang di-Pertuan Agong with his own discretion on the advice of the prime minister, shall continue for five years from the date of its first meeting. Article 55(4) of the Constitution permits a delay of 60 days in the holding of the general election from the date of dissolution and Parliament shall be summoned to meet on a date not later than 120 days from the date of dissolution. Conventionally, between the dissolution of one Parliament and the convening of the next, the prime minister and the cabinet remain in office in a caretaker capacity.

== List of prime ministers of Malaysia ==
Colour key (for political coalitions/parties):

Alliance Party (2) Barisan Nasional (6) Pakatan Harapan (2) Perikatan Nasional (1)

#	Portrait	Prime Minister (Birth–Death) Constituency	Term of office			Mandate (Note: Legend for mandate portion of column: 1955 a year indicates a general election won by the government or that led to the formation of a government (the year links to the election's article); (2022) a parenthesised year indicates an election resulting in no single party or coalition winning a parliamentary majority (the year links to the election's article); — a dash indicates the formation of a majority government without an election.)	Party (Note: This column names only the Prime Minister's party. The government may be a complex coalition of several parties and independents; those are not listed here.)	Government	Monarch
#	Portrait	Prime Minister (Birth–Death) Constituency	Took office	Left office	Time in office	Mandate	Party	Government	Monarch
1		His Highness; Tunku Abdul Rahman تونکو عبد الرحمن (1903–1990); MP for Kuala Kedah	31 August 1957	22 September 1970	13 years, 23 days	1955	Alliance (UMNO)	Rahman I	Tuanku Abdul Rahman Sultan Hisamuddin Alam Shah Tuanku Syed Putra Sultan Ismail Nasiruddin Shah Sultan Abdul Halim Mu'adzam Shah
1		His Highness; Tunku Abdul Rahman تونکو عبد الرحمن (1903–1990); MP for Kuala Kedah	31 August 1957	22 September 1970	13 years, 23 days	1959	Alliance (UMNO)	Rahman II	Tuanku Abdul Rahman Sultan Hisamuddin Alam Shah Tuanku Syed Putra Sultan Ismail Nasiruddin Shah Sultan Abdul Halim Mu'adzam Shah
1		His Highness; Tunku Abdul Rahman تونکو عبد الرحمن (1903–1990); MP for Kuala Kedah	31 August 1957	22 September 1970	13 years, 23 days	1964	Alliance (UMNO)	Rahman III	Tuanku Abdul Rahman Sultan Hisamuddin Alam Shah Tuanku Syed Putra Sultan Ismail Nasiruddin Shah Sultan Abdul Halim Mu'adzam Shah
1		His Highness; Tunku Abdul Rahman تونکو عبد الرحمن (1903–1990); MP for Kuala Kedah	31 August 1957	22 September 1970	13 years, 23 days	1969	Alliance (UMNO)	Rahman IV	Tuanku Abdul Rahman Sultan Hisamuddin Alam Shah Tuanku Syed Putra Sultan Ismail Nasiruddin Shah Sultan Abdul Halim Mu'adzam Shah
2		Tun; Abdul Razak Hussein عبد الرزاق حسين (1922–1976); MP for Pekan	22 September 1970	14 January 1976 (Note: Died in office.)	5 years, 115 days	–	Alliance (UMNO)	Razak I	Sultan Abdul Halim Mu'adzam Shah Sultan Yahya Petra
2		Tun; Abdul Razak Hussein عبد الرزاق حسين (1922–1976); MP for Pekan	22 September 1970	14 January 1976	5 years, 115 days	1974	BN (UMNO)	Razak II	Sultan Abdul Halim Mu'adzam Shah Sultan Yahya Petra
3		Tun; Hussein Onn حسين عون (1922–1990); MP for Sri Gading	15 January 1976	16 July 1981	5 years, 183 days	–	BN (UMNO)	Hussein I	Sultan Yahya Petra Sultan Haji Ahmad Shah Al-Musta'in Billah
3		Tun; Hussein Onn حسين عون (1922–1990); MP for Sri Gading	15 January 1976	16 July 1981	5 years, 183 days	1978	BN (UMNO)	Hussein II	Sultan Yahya Petra Sultan Haji Ahmad Shah Al-Musta'in Billah
4		Tun Dr. Mahathir Mohamad محاضير محمد (born 1925); MP for Kubang Pasu	16 July 1981	30 October 2003	22 years, 107 days	—	BN (UMNO)	Mahathir I	Sultan Haji Ahmad Shah Al-Musta'in Billah Sultan Iskandar Sultan Azlan Muhibbuddin Shah Tuanku Ja'afar Sultan Salahuddin Abdul Aziz Shah Tuanku Syed Sirajuddin
4		Tun Dr. Mahathir Mohamad محاضير محمد (born 1925); MP for Kubang Pasu	16 July 1981	30 October 2003	22 years, 107 days	1982	BN (UMNO)	Mahathir II	Sultan Haji Ahmad Shah Al-Musta'in Billah Sultan Iskandar Sultan Azlan Muhibbuddin Shah Tuanku Ja'afar Sultan Salahuddin Abdul Aziz Shah Tuanku Syed Sirajuddin
4		Tun Dr. Mahathir Mohamad محاضير محمد (born 1925); MP for Kubang Pasu	16 July 1981	30 October 2003	22 years, 107 days	1986	BN (UMNO)	Mahathir III	Sultan Haji Ahmad Shah Al-Musta'in Billah Sultan Iskandar Sultan Azlan Muhibbuddin Shah Tuanku Ja'afar Sultan Salahuddin Abdul Aziz Shah Tuanku Syed Sirajuddin
4		Tun Dr. Mahathir Mohamad محاضير محمد (born 1925); MP for Kubang Pasu	16 July 1981	30 October 2003	22 years, 107 days	1990	BN (UMNO)	Mahathir IV	Sultan Haji Ahmad Shah Al-Musta'in Billah Sultan Iskandar Sultan Azlan Muhibbuddin Shah Tuanku Ja'afar Sultan Salahuddin Abdul Aziz Shah Tuanku Syed Sirajuddin
4		Tun Dr. Mahathir Mohamad محاضير محمد (born 1925); MP for Kubang Pasu	16 July 1981	30 October 2003	22 years, 107 days	1995	BN (UMNO)	Mahathir V	Sultan Haji Ahmad Shah Al-Musta'in Billah Sultan Iskandar Sultan Azlan Muhibbuddin Shah Tuanku Ja'afar Sultan Salahuddin Abdul Aziz Shah Tuanku Syed Sirajuddin
4		Tun Dr. Mahathir Mohamad محاضير محمد (born 1925); MP for Kubang Pasu	16 July 1981	30 October 2003	22 years, 107 days	1999	BN (UMNO)	Mahathir VI	Sultan Haji Ahmad Shah Al-Musta'in Billah Sultan Iskandar Sultan Azlan Muhibbuddin Shah Tuanku Ja'afar Sultan Salahuddin Abdul Aziz Shah Tuanku Syed Sirajuddin
5		Tun; Abdullah Ahmad Badawi عبد الله أحمد بدوي (1939–2025); MP for Kepala Batas	31 October 2003	3 April 2009	5 years, 155 days	—	BN (UMNO)	Abdullah I	Tuanku Syed Sirajuddin Sultan Mizan Zainal Abidin
5		Tun; Abdullah Ahmad Badawi عبد الله أحمد بدوي (1939–2025); MP for Kepala Batas	31 October 2003	3 April 2009	5 years, 155 days	2004	BN (UMNO)	Abdullah II	Tuanku Syed Sirajuddin Sultan Mizan Zainal Abidin
5		Tun; Abdullah Ahmad Badawi عبد الله أحمد بدوي (1939–2025); MP for Kepala Batas	31 October 2003	3 April 2009	5 years, 155 days	2008	BN (UMNO)	Abdullah III	Tuanku Syed Sirajuddin Sultan Mizan Zainal Abidin
6		Dato' Sri; Mohammad Najib Abdul Razak محمد نجيب عبد الرزاق (born 1953); MP for Pekan	3 April 2009	9 May 2018	9 years, 37 days	—	BN (UMNO)	Najib I	Sultan Mizan Zainal Abidin Sultan Abdul Halim Mu'adzam Shah Sultan Muhammad V
6		Dato' Sri; Mohammad Najib Abdul Razak محمد نجيب عبد الرزاق (born 1953); MP for Pekan	3 April 2009	9 May 2018	9 years, 37 days	2013	BN (UMNO)	Najib II	Sultan Mizan Zainal Abidin Sultan Abdul Halim Mu'adzam Shah Sultan Muhammad V
7		Tun Dr. Mahathir Mohamad محاضير محمد (born 1925); MP for Langkawi	10 May 2018	24 February 2020	1 year, 291 days	2018	PH (BERSATU)	Mahathir VII	Sultan Muhammad V Al-Sultan Abdullah Ri'ayatuddin Al-Mustafa Billah Shah
During this interval, the incumbent Prime Minister, Mahathir Mohamad was the Interim Prime Minister. (24 February–1 March 2020)									Al-Sultan Abdullah Ri'ayatuddin Al-Mustafa Billah Shah
8		Tan Sri Dato' Haji; Muhyiddin Yassin محيي الدين ياسين (born 1947); MP for Pagoh	1 March 2020	16 August 2021	1 year, 169 days	—	PN (BERSATU)	Muhyiddin	Al-Sultan Abdullah Ri'ayatuddin Al-Mustafa Billah Shah
During this interval, the incumbent Prime Minister, Muhyiddin Yassin was the Caretaker Prime Minister. (16–21 August 2021)									Al-Sultan Abdullah Ri'ayatuddin Al-Mustafa Billah Shah
9		Dato' Sri Dr. Ismail Sabri Yaakob إسماعيل صبري يعقوب (born 1960); MP for Bera	21 August 2021	10 October 2022	1 year, 51 days	—	BN (UMNO)	Ismail Sabri	Al-Sultan Abdullah Ri'ayatuddin Al-Mustafa Billah Shah
During this interval, the incumbent Prime Minister, Ismail Sabri Yaakob was the Caretaker Prime Minister. (10 October–24 November 2022)									Al-Sultan Abdullah Ri'ayatuddin Al-Mustafa Billah Shah
10		Dato' Seri; Anwar Ibrahim أنوار إبراهيم (born 1947); MP for Tambun	24 November 2022	Incumbent	3 years, 364 days	(2022)	PH (PKR)	Anwar	Al-Sultan Abdullah Ri'ayatuddin Al-Mustafa Billah Shah Sultan Ibrahim

== List of acting, interim and caretaker prime ministers of Malaysia ==
Colour key (for political parties):

Alliance Party Barisan Nasional Pakatan Harapan Perikatan Nasional

Portrait	Name (Birth–Death)	Term of office		Notes	Political party
	Abdul Razak Hussein (1922–1976)	19 August 1959	19 November 1959	Abdul Razak Hussein was the acting prime minister after the first prime minister, Tunku Abdul Rahman, stepped down as prime minister for three months in 1959 to strengthen his party, the Alliance Party for the 1959 federal elections.	Alliance Party (UMNO)
	Ismail Abdul Rahman (1915–1973)	22 September 1970	22 September 1970	Ismail Abdul Rahman occasionally acted as acting prime minister when Tunku Abdul Rahman and Abdul Razak Hussein were abroad.	Alliance Party (UMNO)
	V. T. Sambanthan (1919–1979)	3 August 1973	13 August 1973	V. T. Sambanthan was called to serve as acting prime minister and chair the cabinet meeting for a day when the former prime minister Abdul Razak Hussein was overseas and his deputy Ismail Abdul Rahman had died.	Alliance Party (MIC)
	Ling Liong Sik (1943–2026)	4 February 1988	16 February 1988	Became the new chairman of the Barisan Nasional coalition, alongside as the acting prime minister for a few days.	Barisan Nasional (MCA)
	Anwar Ibrahim (born 1947)	19 May 1997	19 July 1997	Served as the acting prime minister whilst Mahathir Mohamad was on vacation.	Barisan Nasional (UMNO)
	Mahathir Mohamad (born 1925)	24 February 2020	1 March 2020	Appointed by the then-King of Malaysia Al-Sultan Abdullah Ri'ayatuddin Al-Mustafa Billah Shah to serve as interim following his resignation as prime minister during the collapse of his government, pending the formation of a new government. Prior to his appointment, there were no mentions of an interim prime minister in the Constitution of Malaysia.	Pakatan Harapan (BERSATU)
	Muhyiddin Yassin (born 1947)	16 August 2021	21 August 2021	Appointed by the then-King of Malaysia Al-Sultan Abdullah Ri'ayatuddin Al-Mustafa Billah Shah to serve as caretaker following his resignation as prime minister during the collapse of his government, pending the formation of a new government.	Perikatan Nasional (BERSATU)
	Ismail Sabri Yaakob (born 1960)	10 October 2022	24 November 2022	Appointed by the then-King of Malaysia Al-Sultan Abdullah Ri'ayatuddin Al-Mustafa Billah Shah to serve as caretaker following his coalition's defeat in the 15th general election, pending the formation of a new government.	Barisan Nasional (UMNO)

== List of prime ministers by time in office ==
This is a list of prime minister of Malaysia by time in office. The listed number of days is calculated as the difference between dates, which counts the number of calendar days except the last day. The length of a full prime ministerial term of office usually varies according to when the two former and latter general elections are held. If the last day is included, all numbers would be one day more, except Mahathir Mohamad would have two more days, as he served two non-consecutive terms.

Of the individuals appointed prime minister of Malaysia, one died in office (Abdul Razak Hussein), five resigned from office (Tunku Abdul Rahman, Hussein Onn, Mahathir Mohamad, Abdullah Ahmad Badawi and Muhyiddin Yassin) and two lost reelection (Mohammad Najib Abdul Razak and Ismail Sabri Yaakob).

Ismail Sabri Yaakob is spending the shortest time in office, while Mahathir Mohamad spent the longest. Mahathir is the only Malaysian prime minister to have served more than three full terms.

Mahathir Mohamad is the only prime minister to leave office and return for a second non-consecutive term. Consequently, while there have been 10 prime ministerships in the nation's history, only 9 people have been sworn into office as Mahathir Mohamad is numbered as both the 4th and 7th prime minister.

Longest and shortest prime ministerships

Timespan	Prime Minister	Portrait	Length in days	Term of office
Longest prime ministership	Mahathir Mohamad		8,796	1. 16 July 1981 – 30 October 2003; 2. 10 May 2018 – 24 February 2020
Shortest prime ministership	Ismail Sabri Yaakob		415	21 August 2021 – 10 October 2022

Rank	Prime minister	Length in days	Order of prime ministership	Number of terms
1	Mahathir Mohamad	8,796 (Note: Each of Mahathir Mohamad's two non-consecutive terms in office was 8,141 and 655 days long.)	4th • 16 July 1981 – 30 October 2003; 7th • 10 May 2018 – 24 February 2020 (Note: Resigned on 24 February 2020 but served as interim prime minister from 24 February 2020 to 1 March 2020.)	One partial term (9 months, and 10 days) followed by four full terms and two non-consecutive partial terms (3 years, 11 months, and 2 days) and (1 year, 9 months, and 20 days)
2	Tunku Abdul Rahman	4,770	1st • 31 August 1957 – 22 September 1970	Three full terms (Note: Elected in the 1955 Malayan general election for the position of chief minister on 27 July 1955 but it was renamed prime minister when Malaya gained independence from the United Kingdom on 31 August 1957, although it may not be considered a full term given that the election did not elect the prime minister, it is still considered a full term for the prime minister unless his term as chief minister is involved.) followed by one partial term (4 months, 12 days)
3	Mohammad Najib Abdul Razak	3,323	6th • 3 April 2009 – 9 May 2018	One partial term (4 years, 1 month, and 2 days) followed by one full term
4	Hussein Onn	2,009	3rd • 15 January 1976 – 16 July 1981	Two partial terms (2 years, 6 months, and 7 days) and (2 years, 11 months, and 24 days)
5	Abdullah Ahmad Badawi	1,981	5th • 31 October 2003 – 3 April 2009	One partial term (4 months, and 21 days) followed by one full term and one partial term (1 year, and 26 days)
6	Abdul Razak Hussein	1,940	2nd • 22 September 1970 – 14 January 1976	Two partial terms (3 years, 11 months, and 23 days) and (1 year, and 4 months)
7	Anwar Ibrahim	1,459 (Note: As of 22 November 2026.)	10th • 24 November 2022 – Incumbent	Currently serving
8	Muhyiddin Yassin	533	8th • 1 March 2020 – 16 August 2021 (Note: Resigned on 16 August 2021 but served as caretaker prime minister from 16 August 2021 to 21 August 2021.)	One partial term (1 year, 5 months, and 20 days)
9	Ismail Sabri Yaakob	415	9th • 21 August 2021 – 10 October 2022 (Note: Resigned on 10 October 2022 but served as caretaker prime minister from 10 October 2022 to 24 November 2022.)	One partial term (1 year, 1 month, and 19 days)

== List of prime ministers by age ==
This is a list of prime ministers of Malaysia by age. The table charts the age of each prime minister of Malaysia at the time of prime ministerial inauguration (first inauguration if elected to multiple and consecutive terms), upon leaving office, and at the time of death. Where the prime minister is still living, their lifespan is calculated up to 22 November 2026.

The youngest person to assume the prime ministership was Abdul Razak Hussein, who, at the age of 48, succeeded to the office after the resignation of Tunku Abdul Rahman. The oldest person to assume the prime ministership was Mahathir Mohamad (as the 7th prime minister), who took the prime ministerial oath of office 62 days before turning 93.

Died at age 53, Abdul Razak Hussein was also the youngest prime minister at the end of his tenure, and his lifespan was the shortest of any prime minister. At age 59, Hussein Onn was the youngest person to become a former prime minister. The oldest prime minister at the end of his tenure was Mahathir Mohamad (as the 7th prime minister) at 94. Mahathir Mohamad was born before his two predecessors (Abdullah Ahmad Badawi and Mohammad Najib Abdul Razak) (as the 7th prime minister).

Ismail Sabri Yaakob is having the shortest retirement of any prime minister, after leaving office at age 62. Tunku's retirement, 20 years, is the longest in Malaysian prime ministerial history. At age 101, Mahathir is also the oldest living prime minister as well as the nation's longest-lived prime minister. He is the only Malaysian prime minister to have lived into his 90s and become a centenarian. The youngest living prime minister is Ismail Sabri Yaakob, age 66.

No.	Prime minister	Born	Age at start of prime ministership	Age at end of prime ministership	Post-prime ministership timespan	Lifespan	
No.	Prime minister	Born	Age at start of prime ministership	Age at end of prime ministership	Post-prime ministership timespan	Died	Age
1	Tunku Abdul Rahman	8 Feb 1903	54 years, 204 days 31 Aug 1957	67 years, 226 days 22 Sep 1970	20 years, 75 days	6 Dec 1990	87 years, 301 days
2	Abdul Razak Hussein	11 Mar 1922	48 years, 195 days 22 Sep 1970	53 years, 309 days 14 Jan 1976	0 days (Note: Died in office.)	14 Jan 1976	53 years, 309 days
3	Hussein Onn	12 Feb 1922	53 years, 337 days 15 Jan 1976	59 years, 154 days 16 Jul 1981	8 years, 317 days	29 May 1990	68 years, 106 days
4	Mahathir Mohamad	10 Jul 1925	56 years, 6 days 16 Jul 1981	78 years, 113 days 30 Oct 2003	14 years, 191 days (Note: The post-prime ministership timeline was resumed on his second premiership on 10 May 2018.)	(Living)	101 years, 135 days
5	Abdullah Ahmad Badawi	26 Nov 1939	63 years, 339 days 31 Oct 2003	69 years, 128 days 3 Apr 2009	16 years, 11 days	14 Apr 2025	85 years, 139 days
6	Mohammad Najib Abdul Razak	23 Jul 1953	55 years, 254 days 3 Apr 2009	64 years, 290 days 9 May 2018	8 years, 196 days	(Living)	73 years, 122 days
7	Mahathir Mohamad	10 Jul 1925	92 years, 304 days 10 May 2018	94 years, 229 days 24 Feb 2020	6 years, 266 days	(Living)	101 years, 135 days
8	Muhyiddin Yassin	15 May 1947	72 years, 291 days 1 Mar 2020	74 years, 93 days 16 Aug 2021	5 years, 93 days	(Living)	79 years, 191 days
9	Ismail Sabri Yaakob	18 Jan 1960	61 years, 215 days 21 Aug 2021	62 years, 265 days 10 Oct 2022	3 years, 363 days	(Living)	66 years, 308 days
10	Anwar Ibrahim	10 Aug 1947	75 years, 106 days 24 Nov 2022	(incumbent)	(incumbent)	(Living)	79 years, 104 days
#	Prime minister	Born	Age at start of prime ministership	Age at end of prime ministership	Post-prime ministership timespan	Died	Age

== Living former prime ministers ==
Prime ministers are usually granted certain privileges after leaving office at government expense. Former prime ministers continue to be important national figures. The most recently the late prime minister was Abdullah Ahmad Badawi (1939–2025), who died on 14 April 2025.

Name	Portrait	Term of office	Date of birth
Mahathir Mohamad		1. 16 July 1981 – 30 October 2003; 2. 10 May 2018 – 24 February 2020	10 July 1925 (age 101)
Mohammad Najib Abdul Razak		3 April 2009 – 9 May 2018	23 July 1953 (age 73)
Muhyiddin Yassin		1 March 2020 – 16 August 2021	15 May 1947 (age 79)
Ismail Sabri Yaakob		21 August 2021 – 10 October 2022	18 January 1960 (age 66)

== See also ==
- Deputy Prime Minister of Malaysia
- Air transports of heads of state and government
- Official state car
- Spouse of the Prime Minister of Malaysia
- Leader of the Opposition (Malaysia)
- Heads of state governments of Malaysia
