= Security and Public Order Division =

Malaysian Ministry of Home Affairs division

Security and Public Order Division is one of the units under the Malaysian Ministry of Home Affairs. It is in charge of security and public order and ensures the enforcement of the country's internal security laws. The Security and Public Order Division operated under several internal security laws including the Internal Security Act 1960, the Emergency Ordinance of 1969, the Prevention of Crime Act of 1959, and the Dangerous Drugs Act of 1985. The unit is also in charge of running rehabilitation programs. The unit is headed by a secretary, a level equivalent to the rank of army major general, and they report directly to the ministry's secretary general.
