= Payang =

Sarawak constituency

Defunct federal constituency
- Legislature: Dewan Rakyat
- Constituency created: 1968
- Constituency abolished: 1978
- First contested: 1969
- Last contested: 1974

Payang was a federal constituency in Sarawak, Malaysia, that was represented in the Dewan Rakyat from 1971 to 1978.

The federal constituency was created in the 1968 redistribution and was mandated to return a single member to the Dewan Rakyat under the first past the post voting system.

== History ==
It was abolished in 1978 when it was redistributed.

=== Representation history ===
Members of Parliament for Payang
Parliament	No	Years	Member	Party	Vote Share
Constituency created
		1969-1971	Parliament was suspended		
3rd	P133	1971-1973	Abdul Rahman Ya'kub (عبدالرحمن يعقوب)	BUMIPUTERA	5,839; 48.09%
3rd	P133	1973-1974	Abdul Rahman Ya'kub (عبدالرحمن يعقوب)	BN (PBB)	5,839; 48.09%
4th	P143	1974-1978	Abdul Rahman Ya'kub (عبدالرحمن يعقوب)	BN (PBB)	9,246; 74.44%
Constituency abolished, split into Sarikei and Paloh

=== State constituency ===
Parliamentary constituency	State constituency					
Parliamentary constituency	1969–1978	1978–1990	1990–1999	1999–2008	2008–2016	2016−present
Payang	Binatang					
Payang	Matu-Daro					

=== Historical boundaries ===
State Constituency	Area
State Constituency	1968
Binatang	Binatang (Bintangor); Kampung Penesu; Kelupu; Semop; Serdeng
Matu-Daro	Batang Lassa; Bruan; Daro; Matu; Pulau Bruit

== Election results ==
Malaysian general election, 1974: Payang
Party	Candidate	Votes	%	∆%
BN	Abdul Rahman Ya'kub	9,246	74.44	▲74.44
SNAP	Joseph Salang Gandum	3,175	25.56	▲18.28
Total valid votes		12,421	100.00	
Total rejected ballots		480		
Unreturned ballots		0		
Turnout		12,901	76.62	▼6.85
Registered electors		16,837		
Majority		6,071	48.88	▲33.94
BN gain from PBB		Swing		?

Malaysian general election, 1969: Payang
Party	Candidate	Votes	%
PBB	Abdul Rahman Ya'kub	5,839	48.09
SUPP	Nyandang Linang	4,025	33.15
PESAKA	Abu Seman Merais	1,394	11.48
SNAP	Charlie Yu Chee Cheong	884	7.28
Total valid votes		12,142	100.00
Total rejected ballots		598	
Unreturned ballots			
Turnout		12,740	83.47
Registered electors		15,263	
Majority		1,814	14.94
This was a new constituency created.
