= Tun Hussein Onn Jamek Mosque =

Mosque in Malaysia

- Masjid Jamek Tun Hussein Onn
- Location within Johor

Religion
- Affiliation: Sunni Islam

Location
- Location: Johor Bahru, Johor, Malaysia
- Interactive map of Tun Hussein Onn Jamek Mosque
- Coordinates: 1°30′14.1″N 103°44′27.0″E

Architecture
- Type: Mosque

Tun Hussein Onn Jamek Mosque or Larkin Jamek Mosque is a mosque in Larkin Sentral, Larkin, Johor Bahru, Johor, Malaysia.

== See also ==
- Islam in Malaysia
