= Privy Council Office =

Privy Council Office may refer to:

- Privy Council Office (Canada)
- Privy Council Office (United Kingdom)
