= Ulu Nerus =

Terengganu constituency

Defunct federal constituency
- Legislature: Dewan Rakyat
- Constituency created: 1974
- Constituency abolished: 1986
- First contested: 1974
- Last contested: 1982

Ulu Nerus was a federal constituency in Terengganu, Malaysia, that was represented in the Dewan Rakyat from 1974 to 1986.

The federal constituency was created in the 1974 redistribution and was mandated to return a single member to the Dewan Rakyat under the first past the post voting system.

== History ==
It was abolished in 1986 when it was redistributed.

=== Representation history ===
Members of Parliament for Ulu Nerus
Parliament	No	Years	Member	Party	Vote Share
Constituency created from Kuala Trengganu Utara and Besut
4th	P029	1974–1978	Lukman Abdul Kadir (لقمان عبدالقادر)	BN (PAS)	10,739; 62.97%
5th	P029	1978–1982	Abdullah Abdul Rahman (عبدالله عبدالرحمن)	BN (UMNO)	12,436; 62.18%
6th	P029	1982–1986	Mamat Abdul Rahman (مامت عبدالرحمن)	BN (UMNO)	15,446; 63.83%
Constituency abolished, split to Setiu and Kuala Nerus

=== State constituency ===
Parliamentary constituency	State constituency						
Parliamentary constituency	1954–1959*	1959–1974	1974–1986	1986–1995	1995–2004	2004–2018	2018–present
Ulu Nerus			Batu Rakit				
Ulu Nerus			Langkap				
Ulu Nerus			Seberang Takir				
Ulu Nerus			Setiu				

=== Historical boundaries ===
State Constituency	Area
State Constituency	1974
Batu Rakit	Batu Rakit; Kampung Bukit Wan; Kampung Pecah Rotan; Kampung Wakaf Cagak; Merang
Langkap	Chalok Kedai; FELDA Belara; Kampung Bukit Nenas; Kampung Payung; Kampung Sungai Bari
Seberang Takir	Gong Badak; Kampung Tanjung Angsa; Kampung Tok Beng; Kuala Nerus; Seberang Takir
Setiu	Kampung Bintang; Kampung Fikri; Kampung Putera Jaya; Permaisuri; Setiu

== Election results ==
Malaysian general election, 1982: Ulu Nerus
Party	Candidate	Votes	%	∆%
BN	Mamat Abdul Rahman	15,446	63.83	▲1.65
PAS	Lukman Abdul Kadir	8,753	36.17	▼1.65
Total valid votes		24,199	100.00	
Total rejected ballots		1,113		
Unreturned ballots		0		
Turnout		25,312	80.07	▲3.04
Registered electors		31,612		
Majority		6,693	27.66	▲3.30
BN hold		Swing		

Malaysian general election, 1978: Ulu Nerus
Party	Candidate	Votes	%	∆%
BN	Abdullah Abdul Rahman	12,436	62.18	▼0.79
PAS	Lukman Abdul Kadir	7,565	37.82	▲37.82
Total valid votes		20,001	100.00	
Total rejected ballots		1,231		
Unreturned ballots		0		
Turnout		21,232	77.03	▲2.11
Registered electors		27,565		
Majority		4,871	24.36	▼1.58
BN hold		Swing		

Malaysian general election, 1974: Ulu Nerus
Party	Candidate	Votes	%
BN	Lukman Abdul Kadir	10,739	62.97
Parti Sosialis Rakyat Malaysia	Siti Nor Abdul Hamid	6,316	37.03
Total valid votes		17,055	100.00
Total rejected ballots		996	
Unreturned ballots		0	
Turnout		18,051	74.92
Registered electors		24,095	
Majority		4,423	25.94
This was a new constituency created.
