= Hussein Onn =

Prime Minister of Malaysia from 1976 to 1981

Yang Amat Berbahagia Tun Hussein Onn DK I (Johor) DK I (Terengganu) DK (Kelantan) DK II (Selangor) SMN SPMJ SPCM SIMP SPNS DUPN SPDK SSIJ DP PIS
- حسين عون

3rd Prime Minister of Malaysia
- In office 15 January 1976 – 16 July 1981
- Monarchs: Yahya Petra; Ahmad Shah
- Deputy: Mahathir Mohamad
- Preceded by: Abdul Razak Hussein
- Succeeded by: Mahathir Mohamad

President of the United Malays National Organisation (ex officio: Chairman of Barisan Nasional)
- In office 14 January 1976 – 28 June 1981
- Preceded by: Abdul Razak Hussein
- Succeeded by: Mahathir Mohamad
Ministerial portfolios
Deputy Prime Minister of Malaysia
In office 13 August 1973 – 15 January 1976
Monarchs	Abdul Halim; Yahya Petra
Prime Minister	Abdul Razak Hussein
Preceded by	Ismail Abdul Rahman
Succeeded by	Mahathir Mohamad
Minister
1979–1981	Defence
1978–1980	Federal Territories
1976–1978	Defence
1974–1976	Finance
1973–1974	Trade and Industry
1970–1973	Education
Parliamentary offices
Member of Parliament for Sri Gading
In office 4 November 1974 – 16 July 1981
Preceded by	Constituency established
Succeeded by	Mustaffa Mohammad
Member of Parliament for Johor Bahru Timor
In office 11 May 1969 – 31 July 1974 (Note: Parliament suspended between 15 May 1969 and 20 February 1971.)
Preceded by	Fatimah Abdul Majid
Succeeded by	Constituency abolished
Political positions
1976–1981	Chairman of Barisan Nasional
1949–1950	Leader of UMNO Youth
Other positions
1983–1987	President of International Islamic University Malaysia

Personal details
- Born: Hussein bin Onn; 12 February 1922 Johor Bahru, Johor, Unfederated Malay States
- Died: 29 May 1990 (aged 68) San Francisco, California, U.S.
- Resting place: Makam Pahlawan, Masjid Negara, Kuala Lumpur
- Party: UMNO (1949–1951; 1968–1988); IMP (1951–1963); Negara (1963–1968)
- Other political affiliations: Alliance (1968–1973); BN (1974–1988)
- Spouse: Suhailah Noah (m. 1948)
- Children: 6 (including Hishamuddin)
- Parents: Onn Jaafar (father); Halimah Hussein (mother)
- Education: Lincoln's Inn (LLB)
- Awards: Full list

Military service
- Branch/service: Johor Military Forces; British Indian Army
- Years of service: 1940–1945
- Rank: Captain
- Battles/wars: World War II

Hussein bin Onn (Jawi: حسين بن عون; 12 February 1922 – 29 May 1990) was a Malaysian lawyer and politician who was the third prime minister of Malaysia from 1976 to 1981.

== Early life, family and education ==
Hussein Onn was born on 12 February 1922 in Johor Bahru to an aristocratic family. His father, Onn Jaafar (1895–1962) was a pioneer of early Malay nationalism and helped found the United Malays National Organisation (UMNO), serving as its inaugural president. His mother was Halimah Hussein (1900–1988). Hussein's grandfather, Jaafar Haji Muhammad, was the first Menteri Besar of Johor, or Chief Minister, while his grandmother, Rogayah Hanim, is generally understood to have come from the Caucasus region of the Ottoman Empire. She was likely presented as a concubine (see Circassian beauties) by the Ottoman court to the Sultan of Johor, but her exact origins are unclear. (Note: Though Hussein ordered an investigation into Rogayah's heritage, its findings have never been made public. Hussein's brother Jaafar believes that she may have come from a region of the Caucasus such as Georgia or Circassia, or was perhaps a Russian Muslim. His sister Azizah has referred to Rogayah as a Turk, while the al-Attas family has claimed she had no Turkish heritage.) Through Rogayah, Hussein is also cousin to academics Ungku Abdul Aziz, Syed Hussein Alatas, and Syed Muhammad Naquib al-Attas.

In 1948, Hussein married Suhailah Noah, a daughter of first Speaker of the Dewan Rakyat Mohamed Noah Omar. Abdul Razak Hussein was his brother-in-law by virtue of his marriage to another of Mohamed Noah's daughters, Rahah Noah.

Hussein received his early education at Telok Kurau Primary School, Singapore, and at English College Johore Bahru. Hussein's Grade 2 result in his Senior Cambridge exams rendered him ineligible for either Raffles College or the King Edward VII College of Medicine, which combined with the outbreak of World War II, led him to join the Johor Military Forces as a cadet in 1940. A year later, he was sent to the Indian Military Academy in Dehradun, India. By the completion of his training, what was meant to be a two-year ordeal condensed into eight months, Malaya had been occupied by Japan and Hussein was commissioned into the 19th Hyderabad Regiment of the British Indian Army as a second lieutenant. Initially assigned to train new recruits in Agra, Hussein was later sent to the Middle Eastern theatre.

In early 1943, Hussein was called to New Delhi to serve as part of the military intelligence department of the British Military Headquarters in preparation for the British invasion of Malaya. He was later posted to Rawalpindi as an instructor at the Malayan Police Recruiting and Training Centre, where he instructed a police force that would enforce order upon British re-occupation. Hussein was part of the second wave of an invasion force heading towards Malaya when the Japanese surrendered, whereupon he was diverted to Yangon before arriving in Singapore in 1945.

Following his return, Hussein was appointed the Commandant of the Johor Bahru Police Depot under the British Military Administration, where he was responsible for re-establishing a police force. When the military administration was replaced by civilian rule the following year, Hussein opted to leave the army when it refused to grant Malay officers equal status to their British counterparts. He instead joined the Malay Administrative Service, becoming the assistant district officer for Kuala Selangor and later Klang. He left the service in 1949, opting to commit to politics.

Hussein went to London to study law at Lincoln's Inn in 1952. He passed his exams in 1960 and was called to the Bar in 1961.

== Early political and legal career ==
When Hussein's father Onn founded UMNO in 1946, he joined it as the head of its youth committee. He was later elected the party's first youth chief in 1949. In 1950, he was elected UMNO secretary general. The same year, he was appointed to the Federal Legislative Council, serving on its Integrity Services Commission responsible for investigation allegations of corruption against British officials. He was concurrently a member of Johor's legislature and executive council.

Hussein, however, left UMNO in 1951 to join his father in forming the Independence of Malaya Party (IMP), which strived for multiracial politics. The new party did not fare well and Hussein chose to pursue a legal career instead.

Upon his return from London as a qualified lawyer, Hussein joined Bannon & Bailey as a legal assistant until 1963. He then joined Skrine & Co., where he was later made a partner.

Hussein returned to politics by rejoining UMNO in 1968 at the urging of Abdul Razak. He stood and won in the Johore Bahru Timor constituency, defeating the Democratic Action Party's Lee Ah Meng in 1969. Hussein left his position as a partner at Skrine & Co. when he was appointed Education Minister in 1970. He oversaw the implementation of admission quotas for Bumiputra students into institutions of higher education and made it a requirement to achieve a pass in Malay for Lower Certificate of Education (LCE) and Malaysia Certificate of Education (MCE) levels.

Hussein was chosen as the Deputy Prime Minister by Abdul Razak following the death of Ismail Abdul Rahman in 1973. At the time, Hussein was one of the party's five vice-presidents. He was concurrently made the Trade and Industry Minister.

== Prime Minister ==
- Hussein Onn; 15 January 1976 – 16 July 1981
- Monarchs: Yahya Petra; Ahmad Shah
- Prime Minister: Hussein Onn
- Cabinet: Hussein I; Hussein II
- Party: BN–UMNO
- Election: 1978
- Seat: Seri Taman

On 15 January 1976, Hussein was appointed as Prime Minister following the death of Abdul Razak. He also became President of the United Malays National Organisation, and by virtue of that position, Chairman of Barisan Nasional.

The first few years of his administration was plagued by factionalism within UMNO, particularly from former Selangor chief minister Harun Idris. Harun had been expelled from UMNO in 1976 before being charged with corruption, for which he was convicted. In 1978, Hussein was challenged by Sulaiman Palestine, a member of Harun's faction, for the party's presidency. Up until this point, it was tradition for the incumbent to go unchallenged during party polls. Harun later attempted to reclaim control of the party's youth wing in 1980, but failed.

His first cabinet was announced in April, nearly four months after he assumed the position of prime minister. Notably, Mahathir Mohamad, then a vice-president of the party, was chosen as deputy prime minister over Abdul Ghafar Baba, another party vice-president, and Ghazali Shafie, who was reported to be Hussein's preferred choice.

The resurgence of Islam among the Malay population coincided with Hussein's tenure, and his government sought to exert control by starting its own dakwah programs while simultaneously empowering state bodies responsible for directing religious activities and tightening laws on civil society. Islam as a political and social force nevertheless continued to grow.

To prevent chief ministers from gaining too much influence and power, Hussein's administration pursued a policy of appointing younger individuals who would serve just one or two terms. He also oversaw the abolition of the Ministry of Law, with its duties being folded into the prime minister's department in 1980. Prior to this, the Minister of Law was simultaneously the Attorney General.

Implementation of the New Economic Policy (NEP), which began under Abdul Razak, continued under Hussein's government. Manufacturing made up 20.5% of the country's gross domestic product (GDP) by 1980. Concurrently, the value added to the economy from agriculture stagnated while value added from mining declined. Though inflation rates remained low at the beginning of Hussein's administration, it began to rise by the end of his tenure.

Worker's rights were curtailed and extensive powers granted to the Registrar of Trade Unions and the Minister of Labour through amendments.

The Cambodian–Vietnamese War and the Vietnamese border raids in Thailand were among the government's foremost foreign policy concerns during Hussein's administration. Along with other ASEAN states, Malaysia recognised the legitimacy of Pol Pot's Khmer Rouge against the Vietnamese-backed People's Republic of Kampuchea. Malaysia boycotted the 1980 Summer Olympics hosted in the Soviet Union owing to its invasion of Afghanistan, which it compared to the Vietnamese invasion of Cambodia.

Questions surrounding Hussein's health began in late December 1980 when he fell ill during a trip to London. He announced his intention to step down in May 1981, after a coronary bypass surgery in February that year. His deputy, Mahathir Mohamad succeeded him as prime minister on 16 July 1981, following which Hussein retired from politics, citing health concerns.

== Later life and death ==
Choosing not to write a memoir upon his retirement, Hussein said

My life is rather dull, and I cannot see why anyone would be interested in reading about it.

Hussein took an increasingly critical stance against Mahathir in 1987 as the rivalry between "Team A" and "Team B" within UMNO reached its zenith, opting not to attend that year's party general assembly.

Following the dissolution of UMNO by court order in 1988, Hussein became involved in attempts to revive "Old UMNO" with members of Team B in opposition to the "New UMNO" that had been formed by Mahathir. Hussein later sought to mediate the conflict between the two sides and was involved in organising unsuccessful reunification talks.

Hussein died on 29 May 1990 of heart disease at Seton Medical Center in San Mateo, California, at the age of 68. He was laid to rest next to his predecessor, Abdul Razak, at Makam Pahlawan near Masjid Negara, Kuala Lumpur.

== Family ==
Hussein and Suhaila had six children, including Roquaiya Hanim (1949–2006) and Hishammuddin Hussein (born 1961), a senior UMNO politician.

Roquaiya's son Onn Hafiz Ghazi is the incumbent Chief Minister of Johor.

== Election results ==
Parliament of Malaysia
Year	Constituency	Candidate	Votes	Pct	Opponent(s)	Votes	Pct	Ballots cast	Majority	Turnout
1969	P100 Johore Bahru Timor	Hussein Onn (UMNO)	12,565	63.59%	Lee Ah Meng (DAP)	7,193	36.41%	20,767	5,372	72.29%
1974	P109 Sri Gading	Hussein Onn (UMNO)	Unopposed							
1978	P109 Sri Gading	Hussein Onn (UMNO)	19,761	89.06%	Hassan Hussein (PAS)	2,427	10.94%		17,334	

== Awards and recognition ==
=== Honours of Malaysia ===
- Malaysia
  - Grand Commander of the Order of the Defender of the Realm (SMN) – Tun (1981)
- Johor
  - First Class of the Royal Family Order of Johor (DK I) (1976)
  - Knight Grand Commander of the Order of the Crown of Johor (SPMJ) – Dato' (1972)
  - Knight Grand Companion of the Order of Loyalty of Sultan Ismail of Johor (SSIJ) – Dato' (1975)
  - First Class of the Sultan Ibrahim Medal (PIS I) (1949)
- Kelantan
  - Recipient of the Royal Family Order of Kelantan (DK)
- Negeri Sembilan
  - Knight Grand Commander of the Order of Loyalty to Negeri Sembilan (SPNS) – Dato' Seri Utama (1980)
- Pahang
  - Grand Knight of the Order of the Crown of Pahang (SIMP) – formerly Dato', now Dato' Indera (1975)
- Penang
  - Knight Grand Commander of the Order of the Defender of State (DUPN) – Dato' Seri Utama (1977)
- Perak
  - Knight Grand Commander of the Order of Cura Si Manja Kini (SPCM) – Dato' Seri (1976)
- Sabah
  - Grand Commander of the Order of Kinabalu (SPDK) – Datuk Seri Panglima (1974)
- Sarawak
  - Knight Grand Commander of the Order of the Star of Hornbill Sarawak (DP) – Datuk Patinggi
- Selangor
  - Second Class Member of the Royal Family Order of Selangor (DK II) (1977)
- Terengganu
  - Member First Class of the Family Order of Terengganu (DK I) (1977)

=== Foreign honours ===
- Japan
  - Grand Cordon of the Order of the Rising Sun (1981)

=== Namesake places ===
Several places were named after him, including:

- Bandar Tun Hussein Onn, a township in Cheras, Hulu Langat, Selangor
  - Bandar Tun Hussein Onn MRT station
- Desa Tun Hussein Onn, a Malaysian Armed Forces residential area near Setiawangsa, Kuala Lumpur
- Tun Hussein Onn Jamek Mosque, a mosque in Larkin, Johor, Johor
- Tun Hussein Onn University of Malaysia (UTHM) Batu Pahat, Johor
- Institut Pendidikan Tun Hussein Onn (IPTHO) Batu Pahat, Johor
- Kolej Tun Hussein Onn, a residential college at Universiti Kebangsaan Malaysia, Bangi, Selangor
- Kolej Tun Hussein Onn, a residential college at Universiti Teknologi Malaysia, Skudai, Johor
- Kolej Tun Hussein Onn, a residential college at Universiti Malaysia Perlis, Kuala Perlis, Perlis
- Kolej Tun Hussein Onn, a residential college at Universiti Teknologi MARA, Machang, Kelantan
- SMK Tun Hussein Onn (SMKTHO), a secondary school in Kluang, Johor
- SMK Tun Hussein Onn (SMKTHO), a secondary school in Seberang Jaya, Penang
- SK Tun Hussein Onn (SKTHO), a primary school in Kampung Pandan, Kuala Lumpur
- Tun Hussein Onn National Eye Hospital, Petaling Jaya, Selangor
- Tun Hussein Onn Highway, part of the Penang Bridge, Penang
- Jalan Tun Hussein Onn, a major road in Putrajaya
- Jalan Tun Hussein Onn, a road in Seberang Jaya, Penang
- Jalan Tun Hussein, a road in Felda Ayer Tawar, Kota Tinggi, Johor
- Jalan Tun Hussein Onn, a road in Taman Tinggi, Sibu, Sarawak
- Tun Hussein Onn Hockey Cup
- Dewan Tun Hussein Onn, Putra World Trade Centre
- Tun Hussein Onn Memorial, a memorial in Kuala Lumpur
- SMK Desa Tun Hussein Onn (SMKDTHO), a secondary school in Desa Tun Hussein Onn, Kuala Lumpur
- SK Desa Tun Hussein Onn (SKDTHO), a primary school in Desa Tun Hussein Onn, Kuala Lumpur

== Note ==
Political offices
Preceded by Ismail Abdul Rahman	Deputy Prime Minister of Malaysia; 1973–1976	Succeeded by Mahathir Mohamad
Preceded by Abdul Razak	Prime Minister of Malaysia; 1976–1981	Succeeded by Mahathir Mohamad
Diplomatic posts
Preceded by Suharto	Chairperson of ASEAN; 1977	Succeeded by Corazon Aquino
