= Cabinet department =

Government body or administrative agency.

A cabinet department or prime minister's department (often called a Prime Minister’s Office or Cabinet Office) is a government body that supports the head of government and facilitates the coordination and operation of the cabinet. Unlike line ministries, it typically does not administer a specific policy portfolio, instead focusing on executive coordination, policy analysis, and administrative support. These bodies are broadly analogous in function to executive offices in presidential and semi-presidential systems, though institutional roles differ.

== Typology ==
In many countries, such a department is called a Prime Minister's Office. In some other countries, there is a Cabinet Office. In the United Kingdom, the Prime Minister's Office is a part of the Cabinet Office; in Australia and New Zealand, there is a single department called the Department of the Prime Minister and Cabinet. In some countries, such as Germany and Poland, the department supporting the prime minister (the Chancellor in Germany) is called the chancellery.

Self-governing states and provinces within federations that are parliamentary democracies often have similar departments, such as a premier's department or, in Australia, Department of the Premier and Cabinet.

== List of cabinet or prime minister's departments ==
- Australia: Department of the Prime Minister and Cabinet
  - New South Wales: Department of Premier and Cabinet
  - Queensland: Department of the Prime Minister and Cabinet
  - South Australia: Department of the Premier and Cabinet
  - Victoria: Department of Premier and Cabinet
  - Western Australia: Department of the Prime Minister and Cabinet
- Bangladesh:
  - Prime Minister's Office
  - Cabinet Division
- Brunei: Prime Minister's Office
- Canada:
  - Office of the Prime Minister
  - Privy Council Office
- China:
  - General Office of the State Council
- Germany: German Chancellery
- Iceland: Prime Minister's Office
- India: Prime Minister's Office
- Ireland: Department of the Taoiseach
- Israel: Prime Minister's Office
- Italy: Council of Ministers
- Japan:
  - Cabinet Secretariat
  - Cabinet Office
- Malaysia: Prime Minister's Department
- Nepal: Office of the Prime Minister and Council of Ministers
- Netherlands: Ministry of General Affairs
- New Zealand: Department of the Prime Minister and Cabinet
- Norway: Office of the Prime Minister
- Philippines:
  - Office of the President
  - Cabinet Secretariat
- Poland: Chancellery of the Prime Minister of Poland
- Portugal: Presidency of the Council of Ministers
- Singapore: Prime Minister's Office
- Sri Lanka:
  - Cabinet Office
  - Prime Minister's Office
- Switzerland: Federal Chancellery of Switzerland
- Thailand: Office of the Prime Minister
- United Kingdom:
  - Cabinet Office
  - Prime Minister's Office
- United States: Executive Office of the President of the United States

== Former ==
- Northern Ireland: Department of the Prime Minister

== See also ==
- Privy Council Office
- Federal Chancellery of Switzerland
