= Tenggaroh =

- Mukim in Malaysia
- Jelapang in Johor, Malay Peninsular and Malaysia Tenggaroh (Peninsular Malaysia) Tenggaroh (Malaysia)
- Coordinates: 2°9′23.1″N 103°57′49.6″E
- Country: Malaysia
- State: Johor
- District: Mersing
- Time zone: UTC+8 (MYT)
- Postal code: 86810

Tenggaroh in Mersing District

Tenggaroh is a mukim in Mersing District, Johor, Malaysia.

== Geography ==
The mukim spans over an area of 178 km^{2} and consists of 11 villages.

== Geology ==
The mukim also includes the Kerengga Island and Lilang Island.
