= Ministry of Home Affairs (Malaysia) =

Government ministry

Ministry of Home Affairs (MOHA)
- Kementerian Dalam Negeri (KDN) كمنترين دالم نڬري
- Coat of arms of Malaysia

- Logo of the Ministry of Home Affairs

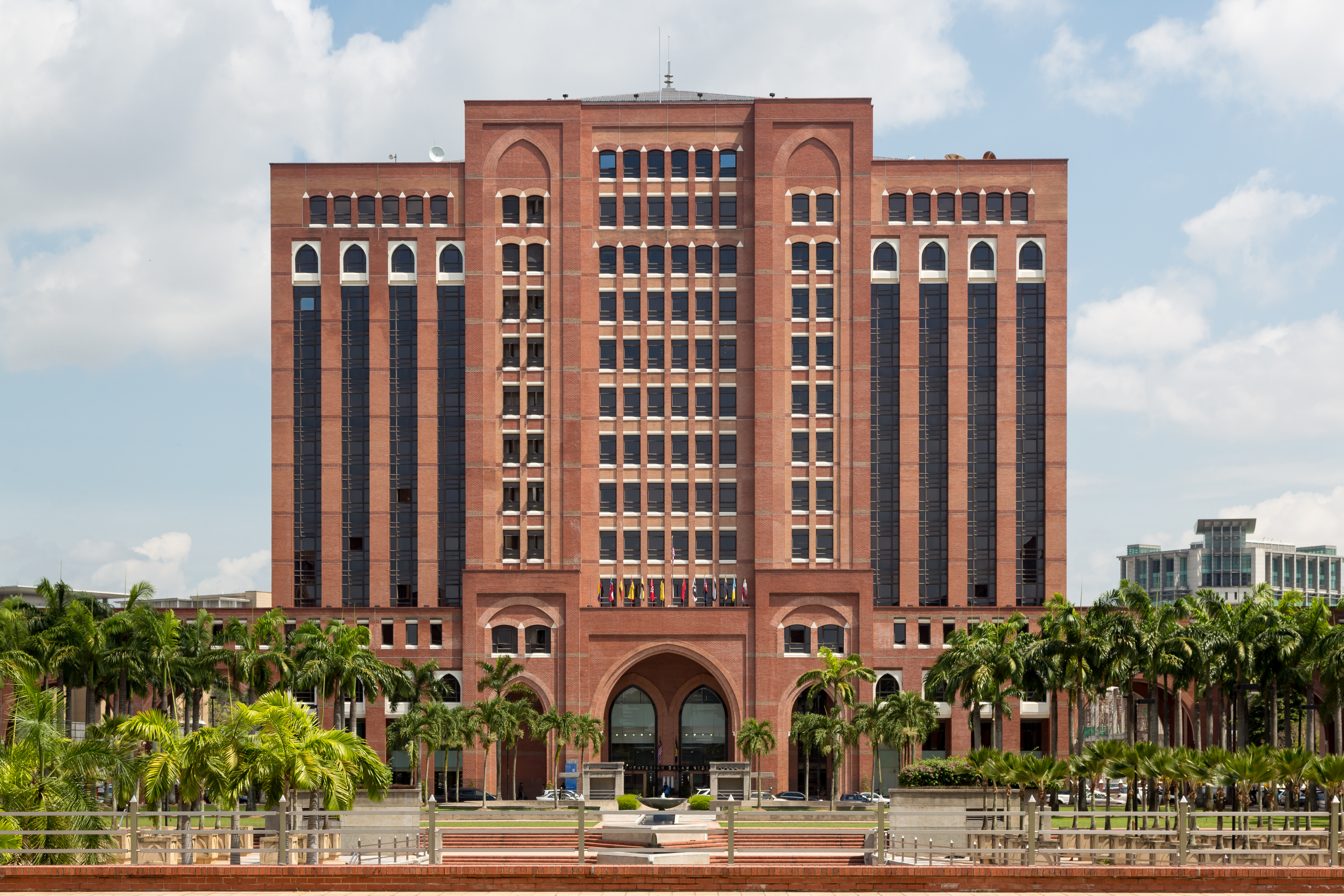

Ministry overview
- Formed: 18 March 2008; 18 years ago
- Preceding agencies: Ministry of Home Affairs; Ministry of Internal Security
- Jurisdiction: Government of Malaysia
- Headquarters: Block D1 & D2, Complex D, Federal Government Administrative Centre, 62546 Putrajaya
- Motto: Security Collective Responsibility (Keselamatan Tanggungjawab Bersama)
- Employees: 187,343 (2017)
- Annual budget: MYR 21,182,930,100 (2026)
- Minister responsible: Datuk Seri Panglima Saifuddin Nasution bin Ismail, Minister of Home Affairs
- Deputy Minister responsible: Datuk Seri Dr. Shamsul Anuar bin Nasarah, Deputy Minister of Home Affairs
- Ministry executives: Datuk Awang Alik bin Jeman, Secretary-General; Datuk Haji Makhzan bin Mahyuddin, Deputy Secretary-General (Policy and Enforcement); Dato' Haji Abdul Halim bin Haji Abdul Rahman, Deputy Secretary-General (Security); Fakhrul Razi Ab Wahab, Deputy Secretary-General (Management)
- Website: www.moha.gov.my

Footnotes
- Ministry of Home Affairs on Facebook

The Ministry of Home Affairs (Malay: Kementerian Dalam Negeri; Jawi: كمنترين دالم نڬري), abbreviated KDN, MOHA, is a ministry of the Government of Malaysia that is responsible for home affairs: law enforcement, public security, public order, population registry, immigration, foreign workers, management of societies, anti-drug, publication / printing / distribution of printed materials, film control, management of volunteer, rehabilitation and implementation of punishment.

The Minister of Home Affairs administers his functions through the Ministry of Home Affairs and a range of other government agencies. The current Minister of Home Affairs is Saifuddin Nasution Ismail, whose term began on 3 December 2022.

== Organisation ==
- Minister of Home Affairs
  - Deputy Minister
    - Secretary-General
      - Under the Authority of Secretary-General
        - Legal Advisor Office
        - Internal Audit Division
        - Strategic Planning Division
        - Corporate Communication Division
        - Integrity Unit
      - Deputy Secretary-General (Policy and Enforcement)
        - Immigration Affairs Division
        - National Registration and Societies Division
        - Foreign Worker Management Division
        - Institute of Public Security of Malaysia
        - The Council for Anti-Trafficking in Persons and Anti-Smuggling of Migrants through National Strategic Office to the council (NSO MAPO) Division
        - International Relations Division
      - Deputy Secretary-General (Security)
        - Film Censorship Control and Enforcement Division
        - Publication and Quranic Texts Control Division
        - Security and Public Order Division
        - Prisons, Anti-Drug and Civil Defence Division
        - National Key Results Area Division
        - Police and Border Security Division
        - Parole Board Secretariat
        - Prevention of Crime Board Secretariat
        - Prevention of Terrorism Board Secretariat
      - Deputy Secretary-General (Management)
        - Senior Under-Secretary (Management)
          - Human Resources Management Division
          - Information Management Division
          - Management Services and Asset Division
          - Parliament and Cabinet Division
          - Police Force Commission Secretariat
        - Senior Under-Secretary (Development and Procurement)
          - Finance Division
          - Account Division
          - Procurement Division
          - Development Division

=== Federal departments ===
1. Royal Malaysia Police (RMP), or Polis Diraja Malaysia (PDRM). (Official site)
2. Malaysian Maritime Enforcement Agency (MMEA) or Agensi Penguatkuasaan Maritim Malaysia (APMM) ()
3. Malaysian Prison Department (PRIDE), or Jabatan Penjara Malaysia. (Official site)
4. Immigration Department of Malaysia, or Jabatan Imigresen Malaysia (JIM). (Official site)
5. Eastern Sabah Security Command (ESSCOM) or Kawasan Keselamatan Khas Pantai Timur Sabah. (Official Site)
6. National Registration Department of Malaysia, or Jabatan Pendaftaran Negara Malaysia (JPN). (Official site)
7. The Registry of Societies Malaysia (ROS), or Jabatan Pendaftar Pertubuhan Malaysia (JPPM). (Official site)
8. The People's Volunteer Corps, or Jabatan Sukarelawan Malaysia (RELA). (Official site)

=== Federal agencies ===
1. National Anti-Drug Agency, or Agensi Antidadah Kebangsaan (AADK). (Official site)
2. Institute of Public Security of Malaysia (IPSOM) or Institut Keselamatan Awam Malaysia
3. Council for Anti-Trafficking in Persons and Anti-Smuggling of Migrants, or Majlis Antipemerdagangan Orang dan Antipenyeludupan Migran (MAPO).
4. Prevention of Crime Board, or Lembaga Pencegahan Jenayah.
5. Parole Board, or Lembaga Parol.
6. Film Censorship Board, or Lembaga Penapis Filem. (Official site)
7. Prevention of Terrorism Board, or Lembaga Pencegahan Keganasan.
8. National Printing Malaysian Limited, or Percetakan Nasional Malaysia Berhad (PNMB). (Official site)

== Key legislation ==
The Ministry of Home Affairs is responsible for administration of several key Acts:

- Registration of Criminals and Undesirable Persons Act 1969 [Act 7]
- Sedition Act 1948 [Act 15]
- National Registration Act 1959 [Act 78]
- Official Secrets Act 1972 [Act 88]
- Passports Act 1966 [Act 150]
- Registration of Births and Deaths (Special Provisions) Act 1975 [Act 152]
- Immigration Act 1959/63 [Act 155]
- Law Reform (Marriage and Divorce) Act 1976 [Act 164]
- Explosives Act 1957 [Act 207]
- Registration of Adoptions Act 1952 [Act 253]
- Prevention of Crime Act 1959 [Act 297]
- Protected Areas and Protected Places Act 1959 [Act 298]
- Births and Deaths Registration Act 1957 [Act 299]
- Printing Presses and Publications Act 1984 [Act 301]
- National Defence Fund (Dissolution and Transfer) Act 1984 [Act 305]
- Dangerous Drugs (Special Preventive Measures) Act 1985 [Act 316]
- Printing of Qur'anic Texts Act 1986 [Act 326]
- Societies Act 1966 [Act 335]
- Police Act 1967 [Act 344]
- Criminal Justice Act 1953 [Act 345]
- Registration of Guests Act 1965 [Act 381]
- Prison Act 1995 [Act 537]
- Criminal Procedure Code [Act 593]
- Film Censorship Act 2002 [Act 620]
- National Anti Drugs Agency Act 2004 [Act 638]
- Peaceful Assembly Act 2012 [Act 736]
- Security Offences (Special Measures) Act 2012 [Act 747]
- Malaysia Volunteers Corps Act 2012 [Act 752]
- Prevention of Terrorism Act 2015 [Act 769]
- Special Measures Against Terrorism in Foreign Countries Act 2015 [Act 770]

== Policy priorities of the Government of the Day ==
- National Home Affairs Policy

== Functions of the ministry ==
The functions of the ministry can be categorised into the following 12 key areas:

1. Security and Public Order
2. Maritime Security
3. Registration
4. Immigration and Foreign Workers
5. Management of Societies
6. Border security
7. Anti-Drugs
8. Publication and Qur'anic Text Control
9. Film Control
10. Management of Volunteers
11. Rehabilitation and Implementation of Punishment
12. Crime prevention
13. Terrorism prevention

== Legal framework ==
The Federal Constitution allows Parliament to make laws related to internal security that include:

- police; criminal investigation; registration of criminals; public order;
- fire and rescue; fire safety; inflammable substances; pyrotechinques
- civil defence; emergency management; emergency preparedness
- immigration services; passports; visas
- prisons; reformatories; remand homes; places of detention; probation of offenders; juvenile offenders;
- preventive detention; restriction of residence;
- maritime security; maritime search and rescue
- disaster management; disaster preparedness; disaster relief
- border security; anti smuggling
- intelligence services; and
- national registration.

== Ministers ==
Minister	Portrait	Office	Executive Experience
Saifuddin Nasution Ismail		Minister of Home Affairs	MLA for Lunas (November 2000 – March 2004); MP for Machang (March 2008 – May 2013); MP for Kulim-Bandar Baharu (May 2018 – November 2022); MLA for Pantai Jerejak (May 2018 – August 2023); Minister of Domestic Trade and Consumer Affairs (May 2018 – February 2020)
Shamsul Anuar Nasarah		Deputy Minister of Home Affairs	MP for Lenggong (March 2008 – current); Chairman of the Perbadanan Tabung Pendidikan Tinggi Nasional (June 2013 – May 2018); Minister of Energy and Natural Resources (March 2020 – August 2021)

== See also ==
- Minister of Home Affairs (Malaysia)
- CCCP-KDN F.C.
