= Ministry of Defence (Malaysia) =

Government ministry of Malaysia

Ministry of Defence (MINDEF)
- Kementerian Pertahanan (KEMENTAH) كمنترين ڤرتاهنن

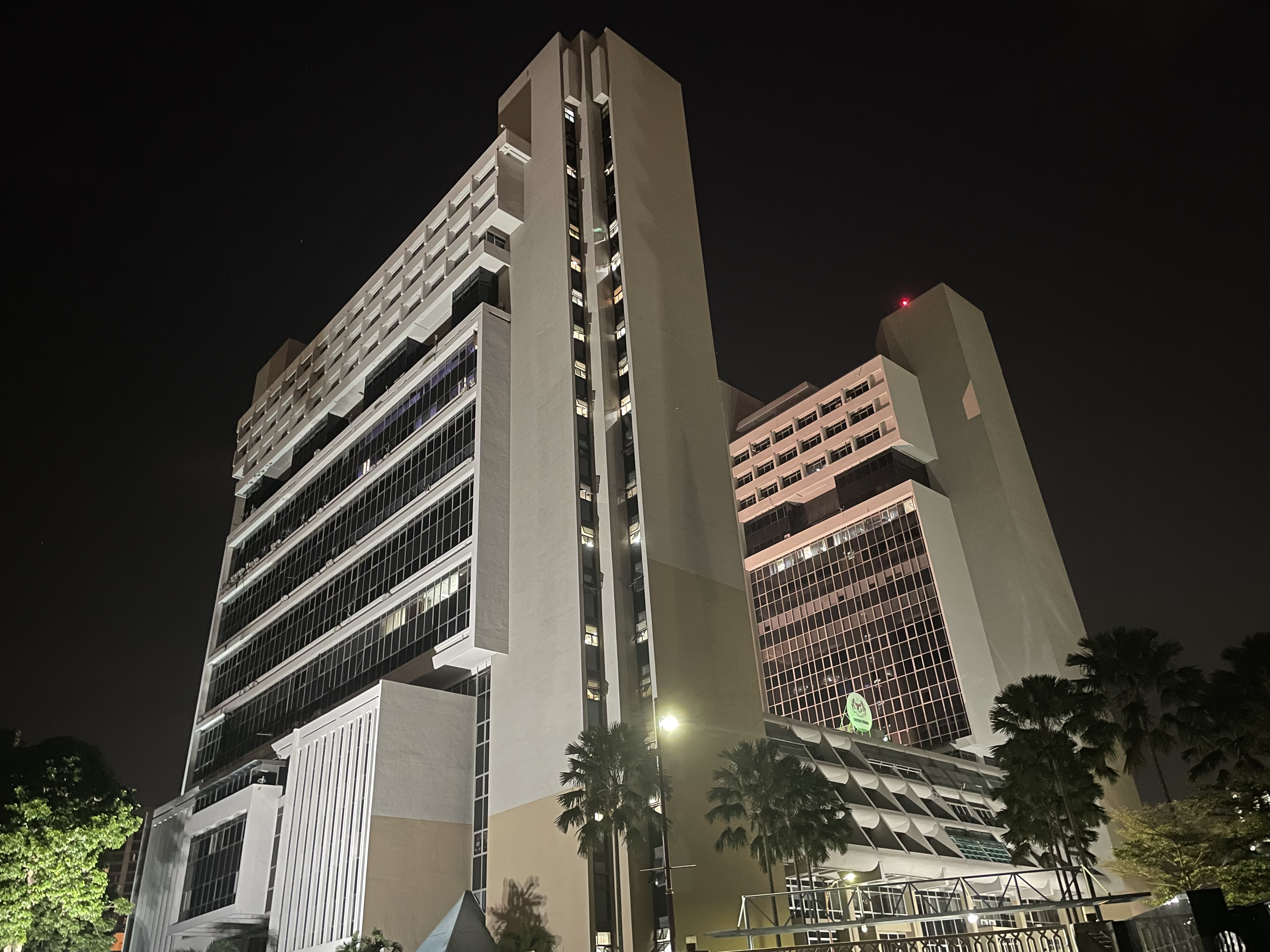

Ministry overview
- Formed: 31 August 1957; 68 years ago
- Jurisdiction: Government of Malaysia
- Headquarters: Wisma Pertahanan, Jalan Padang Tembak, 50634 Kuala Lumpur
- Employees: 168,774 (2017)
- Annual budget: MYR 21,746,268,300 (2026)
- Minister responsible: Dato' Seri Mohamed Khaled bin Nordin, Minister of Defence
- Deputy Minister responsible: Adly bin Zahari, Deputy Minister of Defence
- Ministry executives: Datuk Lokman Hakim bin Ali, Secretary-General; Dato' Abdul Hadi bin Omar, Deputy Secretary-General (Development); Datuk Mohd Yani bin Daud, Deputy Secretary-General (Policy); Datin Roszanina binti Wahab, Deputy Secretary-General (Management)
- Website: www.mod.gov.my

Footnotes
- Ministry of Defence on Facebook

The Ministry of Defence (Malay: Kementerian Pertahanan; Jawi: كمنترين ڤرتاهنن), abbreviated MINDEF or KEMENTAH, is a ministry of the Government of Malaysia that is responsible for defence, national security, army, navy, hydrography, air force, armed forces, intelligence services, counterintelligence, military intelligence, national service, and veterans affairs.

The Minister of Defence administers his functions through the Ministry of Defence and a range of other government agencies.

Its headquarters is in Kuala Lumpur.

== History ==
Ministry of Defence was established on 31 August 1957 and officially began operations in a building located in Brockman Road (now Jalan Dato' Onn), Kuala Lumpur. This building also housed the office of the first Defence Minister, the late Tun Abdul Razak bin Datuk Hussein, who served from 31 August 1957 to 22 September 1970.

The first building of the Ministry of Defence was constructed by the Federal Government at a cost of RM122,000.00 and was officially opened by Tun Haji Abdul Razak bin Datuk Hussein on 18 March 1960. The building constructed in Jalan Padang Tembak also housed the Chiefs and Officers of the Malaysian Armed Forces of the three services.

As a result of growing awareness among leaders of the importance of the armed forces, a complex consisting of six blocks of four storeys high was built in front of the Office of the Member Services Division to cater for the growing membership. The RM 2 million building was officially opened by Tunku Abdul Rahman Putra on 6 April 1967.

After the withdrawal of the British troops, the Malaysian Government took drastic measures to improve the security of the country from any threat. This task is entrusted to the Ministry of Defence as well as the task of improving efficiency in the management of military needs from time to time.

To accommodate all the agencies under one roof, the government has decided to build a new building for the Ministry of Defence. As a symbolic, the foundation stone was laid by the then Deputy Defence Minister, Dato' Abu Bakar bin Datu Abang Abang Haji Mustapha on 10 March 1982. The new building is located at Jalan Padang Tembak, Kuala Lumpur and was built with a budget of RM144 million and was completed in mid 1985. This 20 storey high building is known as "WISMA PERTAHANAN" and provides office space and meeting rooms. The area around "WISMA PERTAHANAN" known as the Defence Complex also provides facilities such as multi-storey car park building, auditorium, prayer room, Field of Defence (Parade Ground), guard stations, towers, computer room, 'helipad', cafeteria and others.

The Ministry of Defence is led by the Minister of Defence and assisted by a Deputy Minister. The organization of the Ministry of Defence consists of two main services. First, is the Public Service which is headed by the Secretary General and the Malaysian Armed Forces (MAF) is headed by Chief of the Armed Forces.

Source :

On March 6, 2023, MINDEF reported that the National Defence and Security Industry Policy (DIPKN) to support the Malaysian defence industry.

On December 12, 2023, Prime Minister Anwar Ibrahim in a cabinet reshuffling announcement, announces that Dato Sri Mohamed Khaled Nordin is the new Minister of Defence, replacing Mohamad as he was appointed as the new Minister of Foreign Affairs.

== Organisation ==
- Minister of Defence
  - Deputy Minister
    - Secretary-General
      - Under the Authority of Secretary-General
        - Internal Audit and Investigation Division
        - Malaysian Armed Forces Council Secretariat
        - Key Performance Indicator (KPI) Unit
        - Legal Division
        - Strategic Communication Unit
        - Integrity Unit
      - Deputy Secretary-General (Development)
        - Development Division
        - Procurement Division
        - Malaysian Armed Forces Cataloguing Authority
      - Deputy Secretary-General (Policy)
        - Policy and Strategic Planning Division
        - Defence Industry Division
        - Defence Reserve Depot
      - Deputy Secretary-General (Management)
        - Human Resource Management Division
        - Information Management Division
        - Finance Division
        - Account Division
        - Administration Division
      - Chief of Defence Forces
        - Chief of Army
        - Chief of Navy
        - Chief of Air Force
        - Joint Force Commander
        - Director of General Defence Intelligence
        - Chief of Staff Malaysian Armed Forces Headquarters

=== Federal departments ===
1. Malaysian Armed Forces Headquarters (MAF), or Markas Angkatan Tentera Malaysia. (Official site)
  1. Malaysian Army, or Tentera Darat Malaysia. (Official site)
  2. Royal Malaysian Navy, or Tentera Laut Diraja Malaysia. (Official site)
  3. Royal Malaysian Air Force, or Tentera Udara Diraja Malaysia. (Official site)
  4. Joint Forces Command, Malaysia, or Markas Angkatan Bersama. (Official site)
  5. Malaysian Defence Intelligence Organisation, or Pertubuhan Perisikan Pertahanan Malaysia (PPPM).
2. National Service Training Department, or Jabatan Latihan Khidmat Negara (JLKN). (Official site)
3. Malaysian Armed Forces Department of Veterans Affairs, or Jabatan Hal Ehwal Veteran Angkatan Tentera Malaysia (JHEV). (Official site)
4. Judge Advocate General Department, or Jabatan Ketua Hakim Peguam.
5. Office of the Ministry of Defence Sabah (MINDEF Sabah), or Pejabat Kementerian Pertahanan Sabah.
6. Office of the Ministry of Defence Sarawak (MINDEF Sarawak), or Pejabat Kementerian Pertahanan Sarawak.

=== Federal agencies ===
1. Malaysian Institute of Defence and Security (MiDAS), or Institut Pertahanan dan Keselamatan Malaysia. (Official site)
2. Science and Technology Research Institute For Defence (STRIDE), or Institut Penyelidikan Sains dan Teknologi Pertahanan. (Official site)
3. Malaysian Armed Forces Cataloguing Authority (MAFCA), or Penguasa Katalog Angkatan Tentera Malaysia. (Official site)
4. Defence Reserve Depot, or Depot Simpanan Pertahanan. (Official site)
5. Ex-Serviceman Affairs Corporation, or Perbadanan Hal Ehwal Bekas Angkatan Tentera (PERHEBAT). (Official site)
6. Armed Forces Fund Board, Lembaga Tabung Angkatan Tentera (LTAT). (Official site)

== Key legislation ==
The Ministry of Defence is responsible for administration of several key Acts:

- Armed Forces Act 1972 [Act 77]
- Arms Act 1960 [Act 206]
- National Service Act 1952 [Act 425]
- National Service Training Act 2003 [Act 628]
- Veterans Act 2012 [Act 740]

== Policy Priorities of the Government of the Day ==
- On 24 February 2020, MINDEF Chief of the Malaysian Armed Forces Haji Affendi Buang had unveiled the inaugural Defence White Paper which sets up strategic orientations for Malaysia's military defence in the next 10 years. The paper highlights Malaysia's geography as a maritime nation and Malaysian government’s commitment to pursuing the three pillars of the defence strategy, namely concentric deterrence, comprehensive defence and credible partnerships. The paper further primed focus on dealing with non-traditional security issues like terrorism, piracy and maritime security, cyber crime and security, and transnational crimes, as well as to apply modern technologies to defence. The 104-page document can be viewed at the following link on the MINDEF website.

== Ministers ==
Minister	Portrait	Office	Executive Experience
Mohamed Khaled Nordin		Minister of Defence	MP for Johor Bahru (October 1990 – March 2004); Deputy Minister of Works (December 1999 – March 2004); MP for Pasir Gudang (March 2004 – May 2013); Minister of Entrepreneur and Cooperatives Development (March 2004 – March 2008); Minister of Higher Education (March 2008 – May 2013; December 2022 – December 2023); MLA for Permas (May 2013 – May 2018); Menteri Besar of Johor (May 2013 – May 2018); MP for Kota Tinggi (December 2022 – current)
Adly Zahari		Deputy Minister of Defence	MLA for Bukit Katil (May 2018 – current); Chief Minister of Malacca (May 2018 – March 2020); State Leader of the Opposition of Malacca (April 2020 – December 2022); MP for Alor Gajah (December 2022 – current)

== See also ==
- Minister of Defence (Malaysia)
