= Deputy Prime Minister of Malaysia =

Political office in Malaysia

- Timbalan Perdana Menteri Malaysia تيمبلن ڤردان منتري مليسيا
- Coat of arms of Malaysia

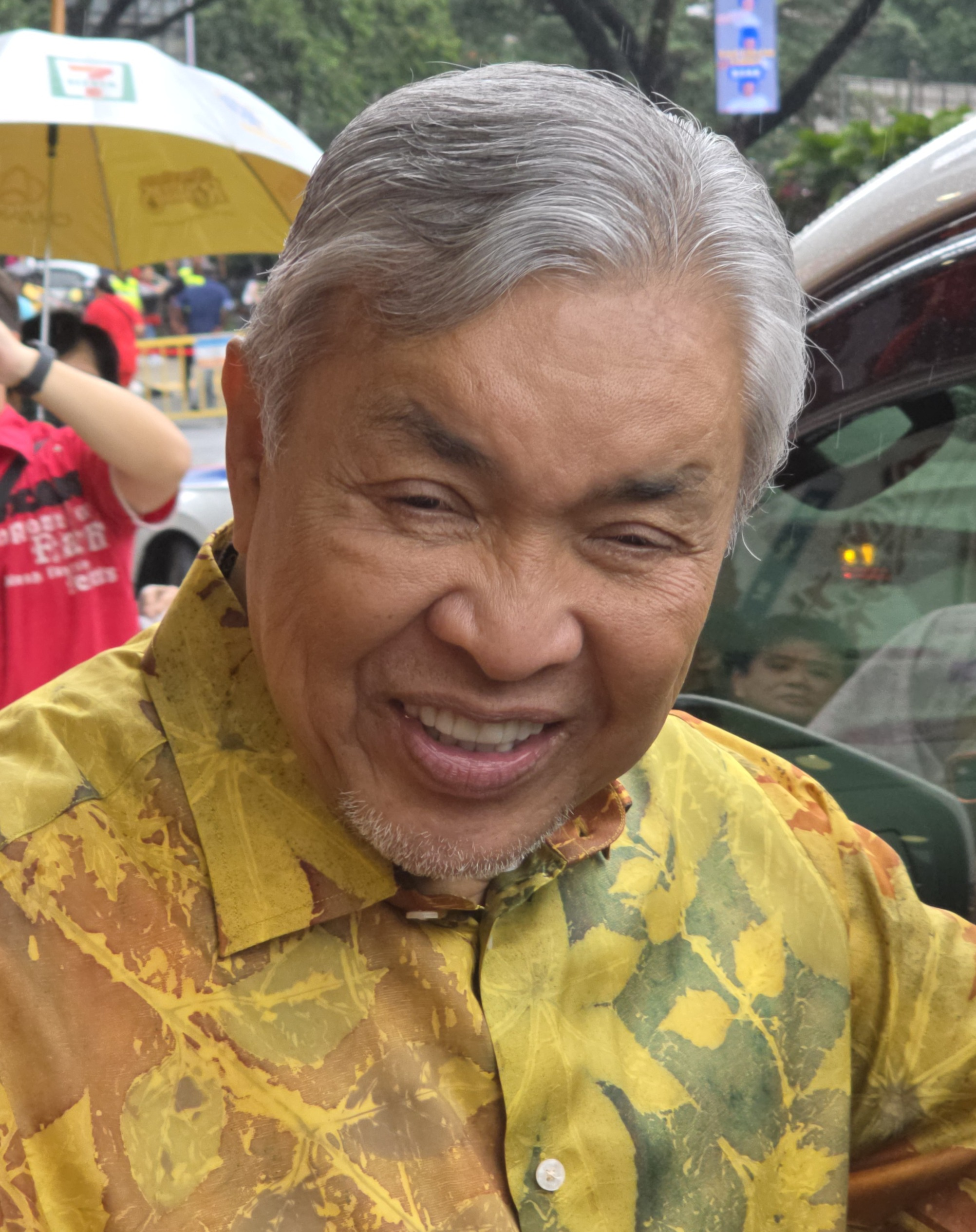
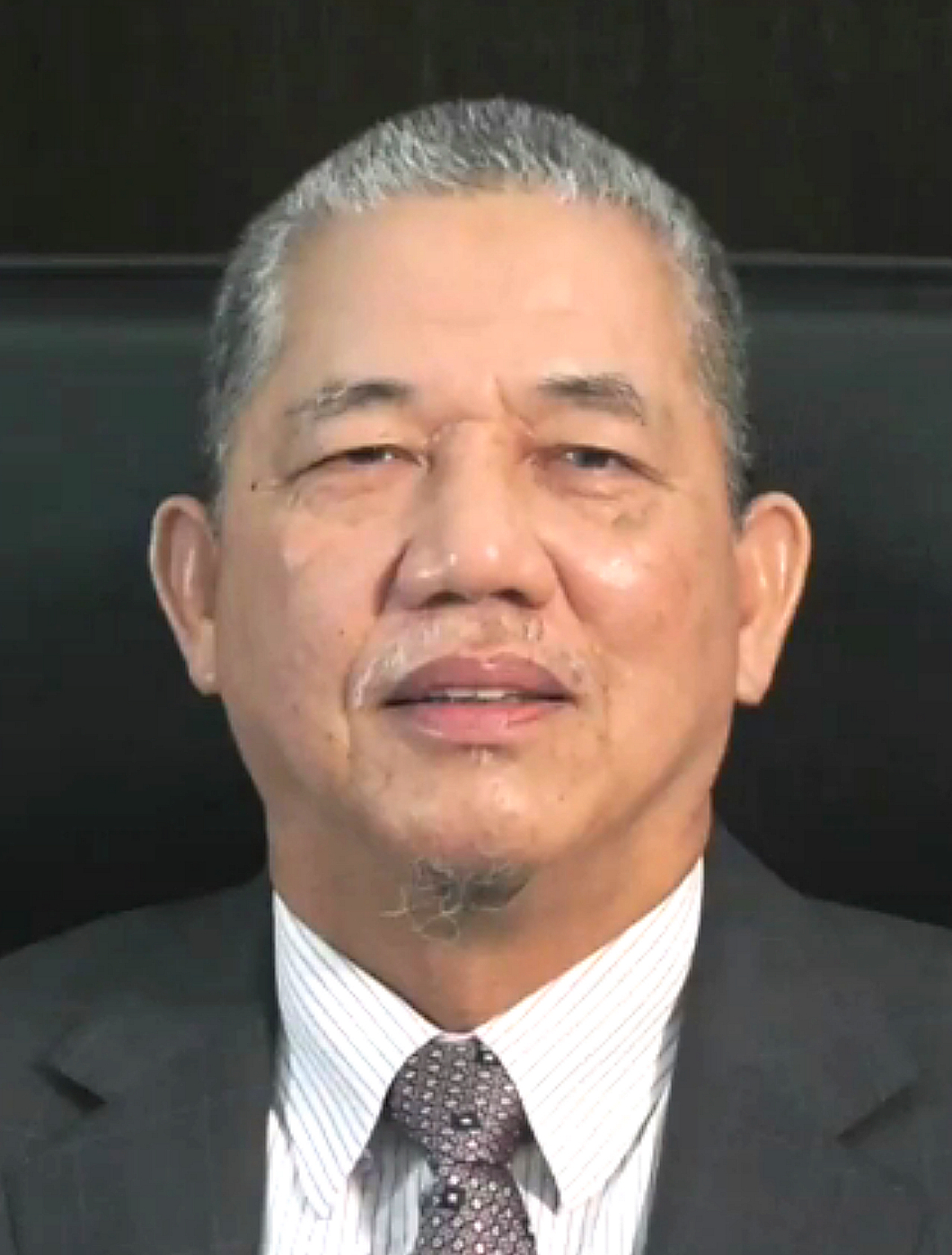
- Incumbent; Ahmad Zahid Hamidi; Fadillah Yusof since 3 December 2022
- Government of Malaysia
- Style: The Most Honourable
- Member of: Cabinet; National Security Council; House of Representatives
- Reports to: Parliament
- Residence: Sri Satria, Putrajaya
- Seat: Perdana Putra, Putrajaya
- Nominator: Prime Minister
- Appointer: King of Malaysia
- Term length: At the Prime Minister's pleasure
- Inaugural holder: Abdul Razak Hussein
- Formation: 31 August 1957; 69 years ago
- Salary: RM18,168.15 monthly

The deputy prime minister of Malaysia (Malay: Timbalan Perdana Menteri Malaysia; Jawi: تيمبلن ڤردان منتري مليسيا) is the second-highest political office in Malaysia. There have been 15 officeholders since the office was created in 1957. The first prime minister of Malaysia, Tunku Abdul Rahman, started the convention of appointing a deputy prime minister, but some cabinets have opted not to appoint a deputy prime minister.

== Appointment ==
Malaysia has had a deputy prime minister since independence, but the prime minister of Malaysia may choose not to appoint one. The office of deputy prime minister is not officially provided in the constitution of Malaysia. A prime minister could also appoint more than one deputy prime minister, as has occurred before in Singapore.

From August 1957 to May 2018, when the coalition government Barisan Nasional (BN), of which the United Malays National Organisation (UMNO) was the main component party, and the only ruling coalition, the UMNO deputy president was usually appointed the deputy prime minister by the prime minister, who was the UMNO president. In the organisational structure of BN, the president and deputy president of UMNO were automatically made the chairman and deputy chairman of BN, respectively.

From May 2018 to February 2020, when Pakatan Harapan (PH), a political coalition of four parties, was the only ruling coalition, the holder of the position of deputy prime minister was decided upon by the presidential council of PH. Wan Azizah Wan Ismail, who was the first female holder of office, was the post holder.

The position was vacant for 16 months when Muhyiddin Yassin was sworn in as prime minister in March 2020 after Perikatan Nasional (PN) was the ruling coalition until July 2021. Ismail Sabri Yaakob was then appointed and briefly served for 40 days before taking over as prime minister. This made him the shortest-serving officeholder in history.

Between August 2021 till December 2022, when BN became again the ruling coalition, there have been no holders of the office of the deputy prime minister for 13 months.The position then is filled by Ahmad Zahid Hamidi and Fadillah Yusof, the first duo deputy prime minister in Malaysian history.

== Deaths, resignations and removals from office ==
Of the thirteen previous officeholders, eight have stepped up to become Prime Ministers. Of the remaining, one died in office, two resigned, two were removed from office (both who later became Prime Ministers) by the sitting prime minister, and two disqualified from office due to defeat in the 2018 Malaysian general election and collapse of the federal administration in 2020–2022 Malaysian political crisis.

Ismail Abdul Rahman died in office due to massive heart attack in 1973. Musa Hitam resigned from second Mahathir cabinet over differences with prime minister over government policy in 1986. Abdul Ghafar Baba resigned from his portfolio following UMNO grassroots lost confidence in his leadership and his position as Deputy President of UMNO was challenged by Anwar Ibrahim in the UMNO's top leadership election. Anwar Ibrahim was the first deputy prime minister to be sacked after being accused and subsequently charged with corruption and sodomy in 1998. Muhyiddin Yassin was the second DPM to be removed from office after being dropped from the Cabinet by former prime minister Mohammad Najib Abdul Razak in a reshuffle in 2015. He later was sacked from his party. Wan Azizah Wan Ismail's role as deputy prime minister ended after the seventh Mahathir cabinet was dissolved due to its fall from the federal administration in 2020.

== List of deputy prime ministers of Malaysia ==
Colour key (for political parties):
Alliance Party Barisan Nasional Pakatan Harapan Gabungan Parti Sarawak

#	Portrait	Name (Birth–Death) Constituency	Term of office			Ministerial offices held as Deputy Prime Minister	Political party	Prime Minister
#	Portrait	Name (Birth–Death) Constituency	Took office	Left office	Time in office	Ministerial offices held as Deputy Prime Minister	Political party	Prime Minister
1		Tun; Abdul Razak Hussein عبدالرزاق حسين (1922–1976); MP for Pekan	31 August 1957	22 September 1970	13 years, 23 days	Minister of National and Rural Development (1957–1970); Minister of Defence (1957–1970); Minister of Home Affairs (1967–1969); Minister of Finance (1969–1970)	Alliance (UMNO)	Tunku Abdul Rahman
2		Tun Dr. Ismail Abdul Rahman إسماعيل عبدالرحمن (1915–1973); MP for Johore Timor (1959–1973) (Died in office)	22 September 1970	2 August 1973	2 years, 315 days	Minister of Home Affairs (1969–1973); Minister of Trade and Industry (1973–1973)	Alliance (UMNO)	Abdul Razak Hussein
3		Tun; Hussein Onn حسين عون (1922–1990); MP for Johore Bahru Timor (1971–1974); MP for Sri Gading (1974–1981)	13 August 1973	15 January 1976	2 years, 156 days	Minister of Education (1970–1973); Minister of Trade and Industry (1973–1974); Minister of Finance (1974–1976)	Alliance (UMNO)	Abdul Razak Hussein
3		Tun; Hussein Onn حسين عون (1922–1990); MP for Johore Bahru Timor (1971–1974); MP for Sri Gading (1974–1981)	13 August 1973	15 January 1976	2 years, 156 days	Minister of Education (1970–1973); Minister of Trade and Industry (1973–1974); Minister of Finance (1974–1976)	BN (UMNO)	Abdul Razak Hussein
4		Tun Dr. Mahathir Mohamad محاضير محمد (born 1925); MP for Kubang Pasu	5 March 1976	16 July 1981	5 years, 134 days	Minister of Education (1976–1978); Minister of Trade and Industry (1978–1981)	BN (UMNO)	Hussein Onn
5		Tun Dato'; Musa Hitam موسى هيتم (born 1934); MP for Labis (1978–1982); MP for Panti (1982–1986)	18 July 1981	16 March 1986	4 years, 242 days	Minister of Home Affairs (1981–1986)	BN (UMNO)	Mahathir Mohamad
6		Tun Datuk Seri Utama; Abdul Ghafar Baba عبدالغفار باب (1925–2006); MP for Jasin	10 May 1986	15 October 1993	7 years, 159 days	Minister of National and Rural Development 1986–1990); Minister of Rural Development 1990–1993)	BN (UMNO)	Mahathir Mohamad
7		Dato' Seri; Anwar Ibrahim أنور إبراهيم (born 1947); MP for Permatang Pauh	1 December 1993	2 September 1998	4 years, 276 days	Minister of Finance (1993–1998)	BN (UMNO)	Mahathir Mohamad
8		Dato' Seri; Abdullah Ahmad Badawi عبدﷲ أحمد بدوي (1939–2025); MP for Kepala Batas	8 January 1999	31 October 2003	4 years, 297 days	Minister of Home Affairs (1999–2003)	BN (UMNO)	Mahathir Mohamad
9		Dato' Sri; Mohammad Najib Abdul Razak محمد نجيب عبد الرزاق (born 1953); MP for Pekan	7 January 2004	3 April 2009	5 years, 87 days	Minister of Defence (2003–2008); Minister of Finance (2008–2009)	BN (UMNO)	Abdullah Ahmad Badawi
10		Tan Sri Dato' Haji; Muhyiddin Yassin محيي الدين ياسين (born 1947); MP for Pagoh	10 April 2009	28 July 2015	6 years, 110 days	Minister of Education (2009–2015)	BN (UMNO)	Mohammad Najib Abdul Razak
11		Dato' Seri Dr. Ahmad Zahid Hamidi أحمد زاهد حميدي (born 1953); MP for Bagan Datok	29 July 2015	9 May 2018	2 years, 285 days	Minister of Home Affairs (2013–2018)	BN (UMNO)	Mohammad Najib Abdul Razak
12		Dato' Seri Dr. Wan Azizah Wan Ismail وان عزيزة وان إسماعيل (born 1952); MP for Pandan	21 May 2018	24 February 2020	1 year, 280 days	Minister of Women, Family and Community Development (2018–2020)	PH (PKR)	Mahathir Mohamad
13		Dato' Sri Dr. Ismail Sabri Yaakob إسماعيل صبري يعقوب (born 1960); MP for Bera	7 July 2021	16 August 2021	41 days	Minister of Defence (2021)	BN (UMNO)	Muhyiddin Yassin
14		Dato' Seri Dr. Ahmad Zahid Hamidi أحمد زاهد حميدي (born 1953); MP for Bagan Datuk	3 December 2022	Incumbent	3 years, 349 days	Minister of Rural and Regional Development (since 2022)	BN (UMNO)	Anwar Ibrahim
14		Datuk Amar Haji; Fadillah Yusof فضيلة يوسف (born 1962); MP for Petra Jaya	3 December 2022	Incumbent	3 years, 349 days	Minister of Plantation and Commodities (2022–2023); Minister of Energy Transition and Public Utilities (since 2023)	GPS (PBB)	Anwar Ibrahim

== Living former deputy prime ministers ==
Deputy prime ministers are usually granted certain privileges after leaving office at government expense. Former deputy prime ministers continue to be important national figures. The most recently the late deputy prime minister was Abdullah Ahmad Badawi (1939–2025), died on 14 April 2025.

Ahmad Zahid Hamidi is the current deputy prime minister and also a former deputy prime minister from 29 July 2015 until 9 May 2018.

Name	Portrait	Term of office	Date of birth
Mahathir Mohamad		5 March 1976 – 16 July 1981	10 July 1925 (age 101)
Musa Hitam		18 July 1981 – 16 March 1986	18 April 1934 (age 92)
Anwar Ibrahim		1 December 1993 – 2 September 1998	10 August 1947 (age 79)
Mohammad Najib Abdul Razak		7 January 2004 – 3 April 2009	23 July 1953 (age 73)
Muhyiddin Yassin		10 April 2009 – 28 July 2015	15 May 1947 (age 79)
Wan Azizah Wan Ismail		21 May 2018 – 24 February 2020	3 December 1952 (age 73)
Ismail Sabri Yaakob		7 July 2021 – 16 August 2021	18 January 1960 (age 66)

== See also ==
- Prime Minister of Malaysia
- Senior Minister of Malaysia
- Spouse of the Deputy Prime Minister of Malaysia
- Official state car
- Air transports of heads of state and government
