= Ismail Sabri cabinet =

Cabinet of Malaysia, 2021–2022

- 22nd Cabinet of Malaysia
- 2021–2022
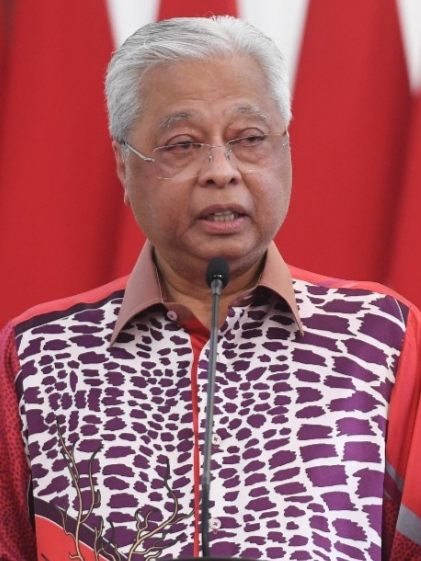
- Date formed: 30 August 2021
- Date dissolved: 24 November 2022

People and organisations
- Head of state: Al-Sultan Abdullah
- Head of government: Ismail Sabri Yaakob
- Deputy head of government: Senior minister: Mohamed Azmin Ali (International Trade and Industry); Hishammuddin Hussein (Defence); Fadillah Yusof (Works); Mohd Radzi Md Jidin (Education)
- Total no. of members: 32 ministers and 38 deputy ministers
- Member parties: BN; UMNO (36 seats); MCA; MIC; PBRS; PN; BERSATU; PAS; GERAKAN (Note: GERAKAN has a Senator but not represented in the Dewan Rakyat.); GPS; PBB; PRS; PDP; SUPP; GRS; BERSATU Sabah; PBS; STAR; SAPP; USNO Baru; PBM; Independent (3 seats) (Note: They are Jugah Muyang from People's Justice Party (PKR), as well as Mohd Khairuddin Aman Razali from Malaysian Islamic Party (PAS), and Masir Kujat from United Sarawak Party (PSB))
- Status in legislature: Majority (coalition)
- Opposition parties: PH; DAP; PKR; AMANAH; UPKO; MUDA; GTA; PEJUANG; PESAKA; PSB; WARISAN; BN; UMNO (Tengku Razaleigh Hamzah)
- Opposition leader: Anwar Ibrahim

History
- Legislature term: 14th Malaysian Parliament
- Budget: 2022, 2023
- Predecessor: Muhyiddin cabinet
- Successor: Anwar Ibrahim cabinet

The Ismail Sabri cabinet (Malay: Kabinet Ismail Sabri) was formed following the appointment of Ismail Sabri Yaakob as Prime Minister of Malaysia on 21 August 2021 and dissolved 15 months and 3 days later following the appointment of Anwar Ibrahim as Prime Minister on 24 November 2022. It was the 22nd cabinet of Malaysia formed since independence. Following the coalition's defeat in the 2018 general election, Barisan Nasional (BN) has formed its first cabinet. This cabinet also has the full support of Gabungan Parti Sarawak (GPS), Parti Bersatu Sabah (PBS), three independent members of the Dewan Rakyat and conditional support of the Perikatan Nasional (PN) coalition.

== History ==
On 1 March 2020, Parti Pribumi Bersatu Malaysia (BERSATU) withdrew from the Pakatan Harapan (PH) alliance, sparking a political crisis that resulted in Muhyiddin Yassin, the party's president, becoming the country's eighth prime minister. The continued COVID-19 pandemic was the principal concern of Muhyiddin's newly formed cabinet. The World Health Organization (WHO) has commended his government for successfully managing the outbreak's initial wave. However, in 2021, the government came under fire from the public for what was allegedly poor management of the outbreak's second and third waves.

Pertubuhan Kebangsaan Melayu Bersatu (UMNO), which had the most seats in the cabinet but did not lead the government, and BERSATU then engaged in internal conflict. On 8 July 2021, and again on 3 August, UMNO first declared that it would no longer support Muhyiddin's cabinet and government. Muhyiddin resigned as prime minister on 16 August after losing his majority.

On 20 August, Yang di-Pertuan Agong Al-Sultan Abdullah appointed Ismail Sabri Yaakob, the deputy prime minister in Muhyiddin's cabinet and vice president of UMNO, as the country's ninth prime minister. After the King was satisfied that Ismail Sabri had won the confidence of the majority in Dewan Rakyat—114 of the 220 MPs had personally come to meet the King to express their support for Ismail Sabri—the appointment was made in accordance with Articles 40(2)(a) and 43(2)(a) of the Federal Constitution. Ismail Sabri was formally sworn in before the King at Istana Negara the next evening.

== Cabinet ==
On 27 August 2021, Ismail Sabri announced his Cabinet of 31 ministers and 38 deputy ministers. The position of Deputy Prime Minister was kept vacant. Instead, the Senior Ministers will deputise for the Prime Minister in his absence should such necessity arise.

The new ministers and deputy ministers were sworn in at 2:30 pm on 30 August 2021, a day before the country's Merdeka celebration.

Deputy Minister-designate of Education II Mohamad Alamin skipped the ceremony as he was tested COVID-19 positive. Prime Minister Ismail Sabri Yaakob as well as Minister-designate of Entrepreneurship Development and Cooperative Noh Omar were also unable to attend the ceremony as they had been in close contact with a COVID-19 patient.

=== Minister composition ===
BN (15)	PN (11)	GPS (4)	GRS (2)	PBM (1)
UMNO (13); MCA (1); MIC (1)	BERSATU (8); PAS (3)	PBB (4)	PBS (1); BERSATU Sabah (1)	PBM (1)

Portfolio	Office bearer	Party	Constituency	Took office	Left office
Prime Minister	Dato' Sri Ismail Sabri Yaakob MP	BN (UMNO)	Bera	21 August 2021	24 November 2022
Senior Ministers	Dato' Seri Mohamed Azmin Ali MP (International Trade and Industry)	PN (BERSATU)	Gombak	30 August 2021	24 November 2022
Senior Ministers	Dato' Seri Hishammuddin Hussein MP (Defence)	BN (UMNO)	Sembrong	30 August 2021	24 November 2022
Senior Ministers	Dato' Sri Hj. Fadillah Hj. Yusof MP (Works)	GPS (PBB)	Petra Jaya	30 August 2021	24 November 2022
Senior Ministers	Senator Datuk Dr. Mohd. Radzi Md. Jidin (Education)	PN (BERSATU)	Senator	30 August 2021	24 November 2022
Minister in the Prime Minister's Department	Dato' Sri Mustapa Mohamed MP (Economy)	PN (BERSATU)	Jeli	30 August 2021	24 November 2022
Minister in the Prime Minister's Department	Datuk Dr. Hj. Abdul Latiff Hj. Ahmad MP (Special Functions)	PN (BERSATU)	Mersing	30 August 2021	24 November 2022
Minister in the Prime Minister's Department	Dato Sri Dr. Wan Junaidi Tuanku Jaafar MP (Parliament and Law)	GPS (PBB)	Santubong	30 August 2021	24 November 2022
Minister in the Prime Minister's Department	Senator Datuk Ustaz Hj. Idris Ahmad (Religious Affairs)	PN (PAS)	Senator	30 August 2021	24 November 2022
Minister in the Prime Minister's Department	Datuk Seri Panglima Dr. Maximus Johnity Ongkili MP (Sabah and Sarawak Affairs)	GRS (PBS)	Kota Marudu	30 August 2021	24 November 2022
Minister of Finance	Senator Datuk Seri Utama Tengku Zafrul Tengku Abdul Aziz	BN (UMNO)	Senator	30 August 2021	24 November 2022
Minister of Defence	Dato' Seri Hishammuddin Hussein MP	BN (UMNO)	Sembrong	30 August 2021	24 November 2022
Minister of Home Affairs	Dato' Seri Hamzah Zainudin MP	PN (BERSATU)	Larut	30 August 2021	24 November 2022
Minister of International Trade and Industry	Dato' Seri Mohamed Azmin Ali MP	PN (BERSATU)	Gombak	30 August 2021	24 November 2022
Minister of Education	Senator Datuk Dr. Mohd. Radzi Md. Jidin	PN (BERSATU)	Senator	30 August 2021	24 November 2022
Minister of Environment and Water	Dato' Sri Ustaz Tuan Ibrahim Tuan Man MP	PN (PAS)	Kubang Kerian	30 August 2021	24 November 2022
Minister of Federal Territories	Dato' Seri Dr. Shahidan Kassim MP	BN (UMNO)	Arau	30 August 2021	24 November 2022
Minister of Transport	Datuk Seri Ir. Dr. Wee Ka Siong MP	BN (MCA)	Ayer Hitam	30 August 2021	24 November 2022
Minister of Agriculture and Food Industries	Datuk Seri Dr. Ronald Kiandee MP	GRS (BERSATU Sabah)	Beluran	30 August 2021	24 November 2022
Minister of Health	Khairy Jamaluddin MP	BN (UMNO)	Rembau	30 August 2021	24 November 2022
Minister of Tourism, Arts and Culture	Dato' Sri Hjh. Nancy Shukri MP	GPS (PBB)	Batang Sadong	30 August 2021	24 November 2022
Minister of Housing and Local Government	Dato' Sri Reezal Merican Naina Merican MP	BN (UMNO)	Kepala Batas	30 August 2021	24 November 2022
Minister of Youth and Sports	Dato' Seri Ahmad Faizal Azumu MP	PN (BERSATU)	Tambun	30 August 2021	24 November 2022
Minister of Foreign Affairs	Dato' Sri Saifuddin Abdullah MP	PN (BERSATU)	Indera Mahkota	30 August 2021	24 November 2022
Minister of Higher Education	Datuk Seri Dr. Noraini Ahmad MP	BN (UMNO)	Parit Sulong	30 August 2021	24 November 2022
Minister of Human Resources	Datuk Seri Saravanan Murugan MP	BN (MIC)	Tapah	30 August 2021	24 November 2022
Minister of Domestic Trade and Consumer Affairs	Dato' Sri Alexander Nanta Linggi MP	GPS (PBB)	Kapit	30 August 2021	24 November 2022
Minister of Entrepreneurship Development and Cooperative	Tan Sri Noh Omar MP	BN (UMNO)	Tanjong Karang	11 September 2021	24 November 2022
Minister of Rural Development	Dato' Seri Mahdzir Khalid MP	BN (UMNO)	Padang Terap	30 August 2021	24 November 2022
Minister of Works	Dato' Sri Hj. Fadillah Hj. Yusof MP	GPS (PBB)	Petra Jaya	30 August 2021	24 November 2022
Minister of Science, Technology and Innovation	Dato' Sri Dr. Adham Baba MP	BN (UMNO)	Tenggara	30 August 2021	24 November 2022
Minister of Energy and Natural Resources	Datuk Seri Hj. Takiyuddin Hassan MP	PN (PAS)	Kota Bharu	30 August 2021	24 November 2022
Minister of Plantation Industries and Commodities	Datuk Hjh. Zuraida Kamaruddin MP	PBM	Ampang	30 August 2021	24 November 2022
Minister of Women, Family and Community Development	Datuk Seri Rina Mohd. Harun MP	PN (BERSATU)	Titiwangsa	30 August 2021	24 November 2022
Minister of National Unity	Datuk Halimah Mohamed Sadique MP	BN (UMNO)	Kota Tinggi	30 August 2021	24 November 2022
Minister of Communication and Multimedia	Tan Sri Datuk Seri Panglima Hj. Annuar Hj. Musa MP	BN (UMNO)	Ketereh	30 August 2021	24 November 2022

=== Deputy Ministers ===
BN (15) PN (15) GPS (5) GRS (2) PBM (1)

Portfolio	Office bearer	Party	Constituency	Took office	Left office
Deputy Minister in the Prime Minister's Department	Dato' Eddin Syazlee Shith MP (Economy)	PN (BERSATU)	Kuala Pilah	30 August 2021	24 November 2022
Deputy Minister in the Prime Minister's Department	Datuk Mastura Mohd. Yazid MP (Special Functions)	BN (UMNO)	Kuala Kangsar	30 August 2021	24 November 2022
Deputy Minister in the Prime Minister's Department	Datuk Wira Hjh. Mas Ermieyati Hj. Samsudin MP (Parliament and Law)	PN (BERSATU)	Masjid Tanah	30 August 2021	24 November 2022
Deputy Minister in the Prime Minister's Department	Datuk Ustaz Hj. Ahmad Marzuk Shaary MP (Religious Affairs)	PN (PAS)	Pengkalan Chepa	30 August 2021	24 November 2022
Deputy Minister in the Prime Minister's Department	Dato' Hjh. Hanifah Hajar Taib MP (Sabah and Sarawak Affairs)	GPS (PBB)	Mukah	30 August 2021	24 November 2022
Deputy Minister of Finance	Dato' Indera Mohd. Shahar Abdullah MP	BN (UMNO)	Paya Besar	30 August 2021	24 November 2022
Deputy Minister of Finance	Datuk Yamani Hafez Musa MP	GRS (BERSATU Sabah)	Sipitang	30 August 2021	24 November 2022
Deputy Minister of Defence	Dato' Sri Ikmal Hisham Abdul Aziz MP	PN (BERSATU)	Tanah Merah	30 August 2021	24 November 2022
Deputy Minister of Home Affairs	Dato' Sri Dr. Hj. Ismail Hj. Mohamed Said MP	BN (UMNO)	Kuala Krau	30 August 2021	24 November 2022
Deputy Minister of Home Affairs	Datuk Jonathan Yasin MP	GRS (BERSATU Sabah)	Ranau	30 August 2021	24 November 2022
Deputy Minister of International Trade and Industry	Senator Datuk Lim Ban Hong	BN (MCA)	Senator	30 August 2021	24 November 2022
Deputy Minister of Education	Senator Dato' Dr. Mah Hang Soon	BN (MCA)	Senator	30 August 2021	24 November 2022
Deputy Minister of Education	Datuk Mohamad Alamin MP	BN (UMNO)	Kimanis	11 September 2021	24 November 2022
Deputy Minister of Environment and Water	Dato' Dr. Mansor Othman MP	PN (BERSATU)	Nibong Tebal	30 August 2021	24 November 2022
Deputy Minister of Federal Territories	Datuk Seri Jalaluddin Alias MP	BN (UMNO)	Jelebu	30 August 2021	24 November 2022
Deputy Minister of Transport	Dato Henry Sum Agong MP	GPS (PBB)	Lawas	30 August 2021	24 November 2022
Deputy Minister of Agriculture and Food Industries	Datuk Seri Hj. Ahmad Hamzah MP	BN (UMNO)	Jasin	30 August 2021	24 November 2022
Deputy Minister of Agriculture and Food Industries	Datuk Dr. Nik Muhammad Zawawi Salleh MP	PN (PAS)	Pasir Puteh	30 August 2021	24 November 2022
Deputy Minister of Health	Dato' Dr. Hj. Noor Azmi Ghazali MP	PN (BERSATU)	Bagan Serai	30 August 2021	24 November 2022
Deputy Minister of Health	Datuk Aaron Ago Dagang MP	GPS (PRS)	Kanowit	30 August 2021	24 November 2022
Deputy Minister of Tourism, Arts and Culture	Dato' Sri Dr. Edmund Santhara Kumar Ramanaidu MP	PBM	Segamat	30 August 2021	24 November 2022
Deputy Minister of Housing and Local Government	Dato' Sri Dr. Hj. Ismail Hj. Abd. Muttalib MP	BN (UMNO)	Maran	30 August 2021	24 November 2022
Deputy Minister of Youth and Sports	Senator Dato' Sri Ti Lian Ker	BN (MCA)	Senator	30 August 2021	24 November 2022
Deputy Minister of Foreign Affairs	Dato' Hj. Kamarudin Jaffar MP	PN (BERSATU)	Bandar Tun Razak	30 August 2021	24 November 2022
Deputy Minister of Higher Education	Senator Dato' Dr. Ahmad Masrizal Muhammad	BN (UMNO)	Senator	30 August 2021	24 November 2022
Deputy Minister of Human Resources	Datuk Hj. Awang Hashim MP	PN (PAS)	Pendang	30 August 2021	24 November 2022
Deputy Minister of Domestic Trade and Consumer Affairs	Dato' Hj. Rosol Wahid MP	PN (BERSATU)	Hulu Terengganu	30 August 2021	24 November 2022
Deputy Minister of Entrepreneurship Development and Cooperatives	Datuk Muslimin Yahaya MP	PN (BERSATU)	Sungai Besar	30 August 2021	24 November 2022
Deputy Minister of Rural Development	Dato' Sri Abdul Rahman Mohamad MP	BN (UMNO)	Lipis	30 August 2021	24 November 2022
Deputy Minister of Rural Development	Datuk Hj. Hasbi Hj. Habibollah MP	GPS (PBB)	Limbang	30 August 2021	24 November 2022
Deputy Minister of Works	Datuk Arthur Joseph Kurup MP	BN (PBRS)	Pensiangan	30 August 2021	24 November 2022
Deputy Minister of Science, Technology and Innovation	Datuk Hj. Ahmad Amzad Hashim MP	PN (PAS)	Kuala Terengganu	30 August 2021	24 November 2022
Deputy Minister of Energy and Natural Resources	Datuk Ali Anak Biju MP	PN (BERSATU)	Saratok	30 August 2021	24 November 2022
Deputy Minister of Plantation Industries and Commodities	Dato' Sri Dr. Wee Jeck Seng MP	BN (MCA)	Tanjung Piai	30 August 2021	24 November 2022
Deputy Minister of Plantation Industries and Commodities	Datuk Willie Anak Mongin MP	GPS (PBB)	Puncak Borneo	30 August 2021	24 November 2022
Deputy Minister of Women, Family and Community Development	Dato' Hjh. Siti Zailah Mohd. Yusoff MP	PN (PAS)	Rantau Panjang	30 August 2021	24 November 2022
Deputy Minister of National Unity	Senator Wan Ahmad Fayhsal Wan Ahmad Kamal	PN (BERSATU)	Senator	30 August 2021	24 November 2022
Deputy Minister of Communication and Multimedia	Datuk Zahidi Zainul Abidin MP	BN (UMNO)	Padang Besar	30 August 2021	24 November 2022

== Appointment with a ministerial rank ==
Portofolio	Office bearer	Party	Constituency	Took office	Left office
Special Envoy of the Prime Minister to Middle East	Abdul Hadi Awang	PN (PAS)	Marang	2 September 2021	24 November 2022
Chairman of the National Recovery Council	Muhyiddin Yassin	PN (BERSATU)	Pagoh	5 September 2021	24 November 2022
Special Envoy of the Prime Minister to People's Republic of China	Tiong King Sing	GPS (PDP)	Bintulu	2 September 2021	24 November 2022
Special Envoy of the Prime Minister to East Asia	Richard Riot Jaem	GPS (SUPP)	Serian	2 September 2021	24 November 2022
Special Advisor to the Prime Minister for Law and Human Rights	Azalina Othman Said	BN (UMNO)	Pengerang	30 September 2021	30 August 2022
Special Advisor of the Prime Minister to South Asia	Vigneswaran Sanasee	BN (MIC)	N/A	14 November 2021	24 November 2022
