= Muhyiddin cabinet =

21st Cabinet of Malaysia, 2020–2021

Muhyiddin Cabinet
- 21st Cabinet of Malaysia
- 2020–2021
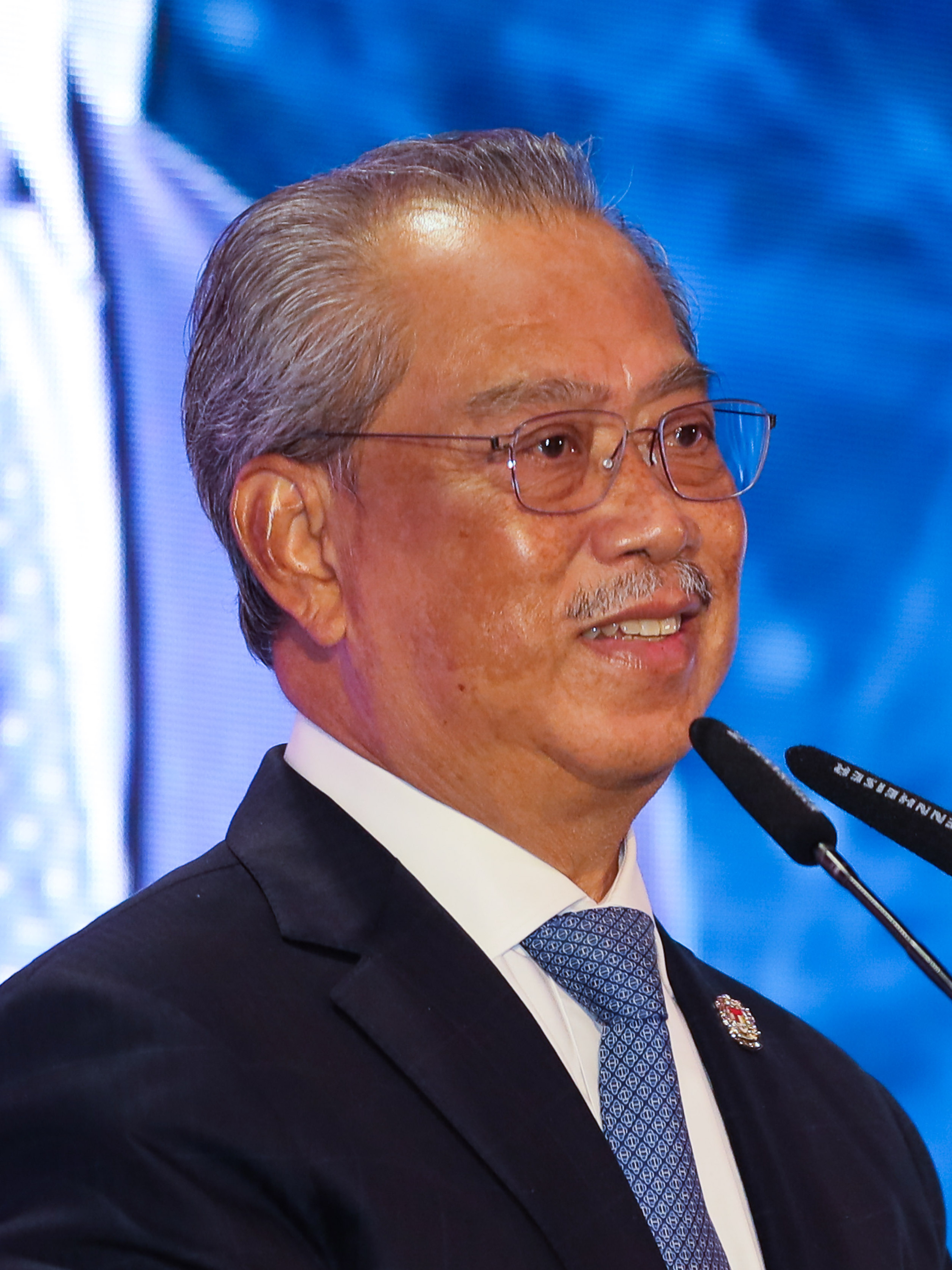
- Date formed: 10 March 2020
- Date dissolved: 16 August 2021

People and organisations
- Head of state: Al-Sultan Abdullah
- Head of government: Muhyiddin Yassin
- Deputy head of government: Ismail Sabri Yaakob
- Total no. of members: 32 ministers and 38 deputy ministers
- Member parties: PN; BERSATU; PAS; GERAKAN; STAR; SAPP; BN; UMNO (23 seats); MCA; MIC; PBRS; GPS; PBB; PRS; PDP; SUPP; PBS; Independent
- Status in legislature: Majority (coalition) (2020–2021); Minority (coalition) (July–August 2021)
- Opposition parties: PH; DAP; PKR; AMANAH; WARISAN; PEJUANG; PSB; UPKO; MUDA; Independent
- Opposition leader: Anwar Ibrahim (since 18 May 2020)

History
- Legislature term: 14th Malaysian Parliament
- Budget: 2021
- Predecessor: Seventh Mahathir cabinet
- Successor: Ismail Sabri cabinet

The Muhyiddin cabinet was formed on 10 March 2020, nine days after Muhyiddin Yassin was appointed as the 8th Prime Minister of Malaysia and dissolved 17 months and 6 days later on 16 August 2021, the day when Muhyiddin submitted his resignations as PM and of this cabinet. It was the 21st cabinet of Malaysia formed since independence. This cabinet was also known as the Perikatan Nasional Cabinet (PN-Cabinet) which combined 15 political parties from the Perikatan Nasional (PN) component parties, with Barisan Nasional (BN) component parties, Gabungan Parti Sarawak (GPS) component parties and United Sabah Party (PBS) as allied partners providing confidence and supply.

== History ==
Mahathir Mohamad resigned as prime minister on 24 February 2020, marking the end of the seventh Mahathir cabinet, where Muhyiddin was Minister of Home Affairs. A combination of factors, including Muhyiddin's decision to pull out his own party (BERSATU) out of the Pakatan Harapan (PH) coalition, the sacking of Mohamed Azmin Ali and Zuraida Kamaruddin from People's Justice Party (PKR) for initiating the "Sheraton Move" and the resignation of nine other Members of Parliament (MPs) aligned to Azmin from PKR, resulted in the ruling coalition losing a simple majority in the Dewan Rakyat, leaving itself hung. However, at the request of the Yang di-Pertuan Agong, Mahathir stayed on as interim prime minister until a new prime minister is appointed.

Following the leadership vacuum, the Yang di-Pertuan Agong summoned all MPs to the Istana Negara (National Palace) on 26 and 27 February to gauge their support for a new prime minister. PH initially wanted Mahathir to return, but later named Anwar Ibrahim to the post based on Mahathir's promise to pass the baton to Anwar before retracting the nomination for another time. The proposed return of Mahathir received cross community support from BERSATU, Barisan Nasional (BN), Malaysian Islamic Party (PAS), Sabah Heritage Party (WARISAN), Sarawak Parties Alliance (GPS) and other political parties represented in the Parliament. However, BN, PAS and GPS opposed the return of Democratic Action Party (DAP) to the governing coalition, the same way Mahathir opposed the return of "kleptocrats and traitors" to the same.

On 28 February, the National Palace stated that none of prime minister's candidates, namely Mahathir, Anwar, Muhyiddin or the self-nominated Bung Moktar Radin, obtained a simple majority in the Dewan Rakyat to form a government. Therefore, His Majesty gave another chance to leaders of all political parties represented in the Parliament to propose a new prime minister on the following day.

As a result, His Majesty has decided to appoint Muhyiddin as prime ministqer according to Articles 40(2)(a) and 43(2)(a) of the Federal Constitution following His Majesty's belief that Muhyiddin could command the majority of the Dewan Rakyat, Datuk Pengelola Bijaya Diraja (Comptroller of the National Palace) Ahmad Fadil Shamsuddin announced in a palace statement. According to PAS Secretary-General Takiyuddin Hassan, Muhyiddin was supported by 114 MPs representing BERSATU, BN, PAS, GBS and GPS. Sarawak Chief Minister Abang Johari Openg later announced that GPS is not a part of the newly created Perikatan Nasional (National Alliance) coalition but a party that provides confidence and supply to Muhyiddin.

Despite Mahathir's claim that he received support from 114 MPs to return to premiership at the night before Muhyiddin's swearing-in, Muhyiddin was sworn in as the eighth Prime Minister at 10.33 in the morning of 1 March.

On 8 July 2021, the UMNO made an official announcement to withdraw its supports towards the Muhyiddin government, citing the mismanagement of the COVID-19, the misuse of Emergency Declaration, and so on.

== Composition ==
On 9 March 2020, Muhyiddin announced his Cabinet of 32 ministers and 38 deputy ministers. The Cabinet includes six technocrats who was appointed as Senators on 10 March 2020 before taking office. The position of deputy prime minister was kept vacant as "there is no need to appoint one". Instead, the senior ministers will deputise for the prime minister in his absence should such necessity arise.

Until July 2021, the post of deputy prime minister was left vacant since Prime Minister Muhyiddin Yassin was appointed by the Yang di-Pertuan Agong on 1 March 2020 until he nominated Ismail Sabri Yaakob for this position on 7 July 2021.

On 16 August 2021, the Muhyiddin cabinet had dissolved after they handed in their resignation to His Majesty the Yang Di-Pertuan Agong.

=== Ministers ===
PN (14) BN (9) GPS (4) Independent (2) PBS (1)

Portfolio	Office bearer	Party	Constituency	Took office	Left office
Prime Minister	Tan Sri Dato' Hj. Muhyiddin Hj. Mohd. Yassin MP	PN (BERSATU)	Pagoh	1 March 2020	16 August 2021
Deputy Prime Minister	Dato' Sri Ismail Sabri Yaakob MP	BN (UMNO)	Bera	7 July 2021	16 August 2021
Senior Ministers	Dato' Seri Mohamed Azmin Ali MP (Financial and Economics)	PN (BERSATU)	Gombak	10 March 2020	16 August 2021
Senior Ministers	Dato' Sri Ismail Sabri Yaakob MP (Security and Unity)	BN (UMNO)	Bera	10 March 2020	7 July 2021
Senior Ministers	Dato' Seri Hishammuddin Hussein MP (Security and Unity)	BN (UMNO)	Sembrong	7 July 2021	16 August 2021
Senior Ministers	Dato' Sri Hj. Fadillah Hj. Yusof MP (Infrastructure Development)	GPS (PBB)	Petra Jaya	10 March 2020	16 August 2021
Senior Ministers	Senator Datuk Dr. Mohd. Radzi Md. Jidin (Education and Society)	PN (BERSATU)	Senator	10 March 2020	16 August 2021
Minister in the Prime Minister's Department	Dato' Sri Mustapa Mohamed MP (Economy)	PN (BERSATU)	Jeli	10 March 2020	16 August 2021
Minister in the Prime Minister's Department	Datuk Seri Mohd. Redzuan Md. Yusof MP (Special Functions)	PN (BERSATU)	Alor Gajah	10 March 2020	16 August 2021
Minister in the Prime Minister's Department	Datuk Seri Hj. Takiyuddin Hassan MP (Parliament and Law)	PN (PAS)	Kota Bharu	10 March 2020	16 August 2021
Minister in the Prime Minister's Department	Senator Dato' Seri Dr. Zulkifli Mohamad Al-Bakri (Religious Affairs)	Independent	Senator	10 March 2020	16 August 2021
Minister in the Prime Minister's Department	Datuk Seri Panglima Dr. Maximus Johnity Ongkili MP (Sabah and Sarawak Affairs)	PBS	Kota Marudu	10 March 2020	16 August 2021
Minister of Finance	Senator Datuk Seri Utama Tengku Zafrul Tengku Abdul Aziz	Independent	Senator	10 March 2020	16 August 2021
Coordinating Minister of the National Recovery Plan	Senator Datuk Seri Utama Tengku Zafrul Tengku Abdul Aziz	Independent	Senator	9 July 2021	16 August 2021
Minister of Defence	Dato' Sri Ismail Sabri Yaakob MP	BN (UMNO)	Bera		16 August 2021
Minister of Home Affairs	Dato' Seri Hamzah Zainudin MP	PN (BERSATU)	Larut		16 August 2021
Minister of International Trade and Industry	Dato' Seri Mohamed Azmin Ali MP	PN (BERSATU)	Gombak		16 August 2021
Minister of Education	Senator Datuk Dr. Mohd. Radzi Md. Jidin	PN (BERSATU)	Senator		16 August 2021
Minister of Environment and Water	Dato' Sri Ustaz Tuan Ibrahim Tuan Man MP	PN (PAS)	Kubang Kerian		16 August 2021
Minister of Federal Territories	Tan Sri Datuk Seri Panglima Hj. Annuar Hj. Musa MP	BN (UMNO)	Ketereh		16 August 2021
Minister of Transport	Datuk Seri Ir. Dr. Wee Ka Siong MP	BN (MCA)	Ayer Hitam		16 August 2021
Minister of Agriculture and Food Industries	Datuk Seri Dr. Ronald Kiandee MP	PN (BERSATU)	Beluran		16 August 2021
Minister of Health	Dato' Sri Dr. Adham Baba MP	BN (UMNO)	Tenggara		16 August 2021
Minister of Tourism, Arts and Culture	Dato' Sri Hjh. Nancy Shukri MP	GPS (PBB)	Batang Sadong		16 August 2021
Minister of Housing and Local Government	Datuk Hjh. Zuraida Kamaruddin MP	PN (BERSATU)	Ampang		16 August 2021
Minister of Foreign Affairs	Dato' Sri Hishammuddin Hussein MP	BN (UMNO)	Sembrong		16 August 2021
Minister of Higher Education	Datuk Seri Dr. Noraini Ahmad MP	BN (UMNO)	Parit Sulong		6 August 2021
Minister of Human Resources	Datuk Seri Saravanan Murugan MP	BN (MIC)	Tapah		16 August 2021
Minister of Domestic Trade and Consumer Affairs	Dato' Sri Alexander Nanta Linggi MP	GPS (PBB)	Kapit		16 August 2021
Minister of Entrepreneurship Development and Cooperative	Dato' Sri Dr. Hj. Wan Junaidi Tuanku Jaafar MP	GPS (PBB)	Santubong		16 August 2021
Minister of Rural Development	Datuk Dr. Hj. Abdul Latiff Hj. Ahmad MP	PN (BERSATU)	Mersing		16 August 2021
Minister of Works	Dato' Sri Hj. Fadillah Hj. Yusof MP	GPS (PBB)	Petra Jaya		16 August 2021
Minister of Science, Technology and Innovation	Khairy Jamaluddin MP	BN (UMNO)	Rembau		16 August 2021
Coordinating Minister of the National COVID-19 Immunisation Programme	Khairy Jamaluddin MP	BN (UMNO)	Rembau	4 February 2021	16 August 2021
Minister of Energy and Natural Resources	Datuk Seri Dr. Shamsul Anuar Nasarah MP	BN (UMNO)	Lenggong	10 March 2020	3 August 2021
Minister of Plantation Industries and Commodities	Dato' Ustaz Dr. Mohd. Khairuddin Aman Razali MP	PN (PAS)	Kuala Nerus	10 March 2020	16 August 2021
Minister of Women, Family and Community Development	Datuk Seri Rina Mohd. Harun MP	PN (BERSATU)	Titiwangsa	10 March 2020	16 August 2021
Minister of National Unity	Datuk Halimah Mohamed Sadique MP	BN (UMNO)	Kota Tinggi	10 March 2020	16 August 2021
Minister of Youth and Sports	Dato' Sri Reezal Merican Naina Merican MP	BN (UMNO)	Kepala Batas	10 March 2020	16 August 2021
Minister of Communication and Multimedia	Dato' Saifuddin Abdullah MP	PN (BERSATU)	Indera Mahkota	10 March 2020	16 August 2021

=== Deputy Ministers ===
PN (21) BN (13) GPS (4)

Portfolio	Office bearer	Party	Constituency	Took office	Left office
Deputy Minister in the Prime Minister's Department	Datuk Arthur Joseph Kurup MP (Economy)	BN (PBRS)	Pensiangan	10 March 2020	16 August 2021
Deputy Minister in the Prime Minister's Department	Datuk Mastura Tan Sri Mohd. Yazid MP (Special Functions)	BN (UMNO)	Kuala Kangsar	10 March 2020	16 August 2021
Deputy Minister in the Prime Minister's Department	Dato' Eddin Syazlee Shith MP (Parliament and Law)	PN (BERSATU)	Kuala Pilah	10 March 2020	6 July 2020
Deputy Minister in the Prime Minister's Department	Datuk Shabudin Yahaya MP (Parliament and Law)	PN (BERSATU)	Tasek Gelugor	6 July 2020	16 August 2021
Deputy Minister in the Prime Minister's Department	Datuk Ustaz Hj. Ahmad Marzuk Shaary MP (Religious Affairs)	PN (PAS)	Pengkalan Chepa	10 March 2020	16 August 2021
Deputy Minister in the Prime Minister's Department	Dato' Hjh. Hanifah Hajar Taib MP (Sabah and Sarawak Affairs)	GPS (PBB)	Mukah	10 March 2020	16 August 2021
Deputy Minister of Finance	Datuk Abdul Rahim Bakri MP	PN (BERSATU)	Kudat	10 March 2020	16 August 2021
Deputy Minister of Finance	Mohd. Shahar Abdullah MP	BN (UMNO)	Paya Besar	10 March 2020	16 August 2021
Deputy Minister of Defence	Dato' Sri Ikmal Hisham Abdul Aziz MP	PN (BERSATU)	Tanah Merah	10 March 2020	16 August 2021
Deputy Minister of Home Affairs	Jonathan Yasin MP	PN (BERSATU)	Ranau	10 March 2020	16 August 2021
Deputy Minister of Home Affairs	Dato' Sri Dr. Hj. Ismail Hj. Mohamed Said MP	BN (UMNO)	Kuala Krau	10 March 2020	16 August 2021
Deputy Minister of International Trade and Industry	Senator Datuk Lim Ban Hong	BN (MCA)	Senator	10 March 2020	16 August 2021
Deputy Minister of Education	Muslimin Yahaya MP	PN (BERSATU)	Sungai Besar	10 March 2020	16 August 2021
Deputy Minister of Education	Senator Dato' Dr. Mah Hang Soon	BN (MCA)	Senator	10 March 2020	16 August 2021
Deputy Minister of Environment and Water	Senator Dato' Dr. Ahmad Masrizal Muhammad	BN (UMNO)	Senator	10 March 2020	16 August 2021
Deputy Minister of Federal Territories	Dato' Sri Dr. Edmund Santhara Kumar Ramanaidu MP	PN (BERSATU)	Segamat	10 March 2020	16 August 2021
Deputy Minister of Transport	Datuk Hj. Hasbi Hj. Habibollah MP	GPS (PBB)	Limbang	10 March 2020	16 August 2021
Deputy Minister of Agriculture and Food Industries	Datuk Seri Hj. Ahmad Hamzah MP	BN (UMNO)	Jasin	10 March 2020	16 August 2021
Deputy Minister of Agriculture and Food Industries	Dato' Hj. Che Abdullah Mat Nawi MP	PN (PAS)	Tumpat	10 March 2020	16 August 2021
Deputy Minister of Health	Dato' Dr. Hj. Noor Azmi Ghazali MP	PN (BERSATU)	Bagan Serai	10 March 2020	16 August 2021
Deputy Minister of Health	Datuk Aaron Ago Dagang MP	GPS (PRS)	Kanowit	10 March 2020	16 August 2021
Deputy Minister of Tourism, Arts and Culture	Datuk Seri Panglima Dr. Jeffrey Gapari Kitingan MP	PN (STAR)	Keningau	10 March 2020	29 September 2020
Deputy Minister of Tourism, Arts and Culture	Senator Datuk Guan Dee Koh Hoi	PN (STAR)	Senator	16 April 2021	16 August 2021
Deputy Minister of Housing and Local Government	Dato' Sri Dr. Hj. Ismail Hj. Abd. Muttalib MP	BN (UMNO)	Maran	10 March 2020	16 August 2021
Deputy Minister of Foreign Affairs	Dato' Hj. Kamarudin Jaffar MP	PN (BERSATU)	Bandar Tun Razak	10 March 2020	16 August 2021
Deputy Minister of Higher Education	Dato' Dr. Mansor Othman MP	PN (BERSATU)	Nibong Tebal	10 March 2020	16 August 2021
Deputy Minister of Human Resources	Datuk Hj. Awang Hashim MP	PN (PAS)	Pendang	10 March 2020	16 August 2021
Deputy Minister of Domestic Trade and Consumer Affairs	Dato' Hj. Rosol Wahid MP	PN (BERSATU)	Hulu Terengganu	10 March 2020	16 August 2021
Deputy Minister of Entrepreneurship Development and Cooperatives	Datuk Wira Hjh. Mas Ermieyati Hj. Samsudin MP	PN (BERSATU)	Masjid Tanah	10 March 2020	16 August 2021
Deputy Minister of Rural Development	Dato' Sri Abdul Rahman Mohamad MP	BN (UMNO)	Lipis	10 March 2020	16 August 2021
Deputy Minister of Rural Development	Dato Henry Sum Agong MP	GPS (PBB)	Lawas	10 March 2020	16 August 2021
Deputy Minister of Works	Datuk Dr. Shahruddin Md. Salleh MP	PN (BERSATU)	Sri Gading	10 March 2020	4 June 2020
Deputy Minister of Works	Dato' Eddin Syazlee Shith MP	PN (BERSATU)	Kuala Pilah	6 July 2020	16 August 2021
Deputy Minister of Science, Technology and Innovation	Datuk Hj. Ahmad Amzad Hashim MP	PN (PAS)	Kuala Terengganu	10 March 2020	16 August 2021
Deputy Minister of Energy and Natural Resources	Datuk Ali Anak Biju MP	PN (BERSATU)	Saratok	10 March 2020	16 August 2021
Deputy Minister of Plantation Industries and Commodities	Datuk Willie Anak Mongin MP	PN (BERSATU)	Puncak Borneo	10 March 2020	16 August 2021
Deputy Minister of Plantation Industries and Commodities	Dato' Sri Dr. Wee Jeck Seng MP	BN (MCA)	Tanjung Piai	10 March 2020	16 August 2021
Deputy Minister of Women, Family and Community Development	Dato' Hjh. Siti Zailah Mohd. Yusoff MP	PN (PAS)	Rantau Panjang	10 March 2020	16 August 2021
Deputy Minister of National Unity	Senator Dato' Sri Ti Lian Ker	BN (MCA)	Senator	5 May 2020	16 August 2021
Deputy Minister of Youth and Sports	Senator Wan Ahmad Fayhsal Wan Ahmad Kamal	PN (BERSATU)	Senator	10 March 2020	16 August 2021
Deputy Minister of Communication and Multimedia	Datuk Zahidi Zainul Abidin MP	BN (UMNO)	Padang Besar	10 March 2020	16 August 2021

== Appointment with a ministerial rank ==
Portofolio	Office bearer	Party	Constituency	Took office	Left office
Special envoy of the prime minister to Middle East	Abdul Hadi Awang	PN (PAS)	Marang	2 April 2020	16 August 2021
Special advisor to the prime minister for community networking, communication and socio-economic development	Ahmad Faizal Azumu	PN (BERSATU)	Tambun	5 August 2021	16 August 2021
Special envoy of the prime minister to China	Tiong King Sing	GPS (PDP)	Bintulu	20 April 2020	16 August 2021
Special envoy of the prime minister to East Asia	Richard Riot Jaem	GPS (SUPP)	Serian	16 May 2020	16 August 2021

== Changes ==
Under this Cabinet:

- Ministry of Agriculture and Agro-based Industry was renamed as Ministry of Agriculture and Food Industries.
- Ministry of Economic Affairs was returned to the Prime Minister's Department in its original form as economic affairs portfolio.
- A single Ministry of Education was divided into two separate ministries. Ministry of Higher Education was reinstated.
- Ministry of Energy, Science, Technology, Environment and Climate Change and Ministry of Water, Land and Natural Resources were reorganised into three different ministries, namely Ministry of Energy and Natural Resources, Ministry of Science, Technology and Innovation and Ministry of Environment and Water.
- Ministry of National Unity was established as a result of separation of national unity portfolio from the Prime Minister's Department.
- Ministry of Primary Industries was renamed as Ministry of Plantation Industries and Commodities.
