= Senior Minister of Malaysia =

Former political office of Malaysia

- Menteri Kanan Malaysia منتري کانن مليسيا
- Style: Yang Berhormat Menteri (The Honourable Minister ) unless otherwise specified
- Member of: Cabinet; Parliament (Note: Either the Member of House of Representatives or Senate.)
- Reports to: Parliament
- Nominator: Prime Minister
- Appointer: Yang di-Pertuan Agong
- Term length: 5 years, renewable. Depended on the Prime Minister
- Formation: 10 March 2020; 6 years ago
- First holder: Mohamed Azmin Ali; Ismail Sabri Yaakob; Fadillah Yusof; Mohd Radzi Md Jidin
- Final holder: Mohamed Azmin Ali; Hishammuddin Hussein; Fadillah Yusof; Mohd Radzi Md Jidin
- Abolished: 10 October 2022; 4 years ago
- Website: www.kabinet.gov.my/bkpp/index.php/anggota-pentadbiran/menteri

Senior Minister of Malaysia (Malay: Menteri Kanan Malaysia; Jawi: منتري کانن مليسيا) was the third highest-ranking political office within the Malaysian cabinet, ranking above a federal minister and below the deputy prime minister (Note: It was the second highest political office from 10 March 2020 to 7 July 2021 and again from 30 August 2021 to 24 November 2022. The office of the Deputy Prime Minister as the second highest level of political office was served in from 7 July 2021 to 16 August 2021. Therefore, the office was demoted in ranking, from the second to the third and hence it was the third highest political office from 7 July 2021 to 16 August 2021.) in Malaysia from 10 March 2020 until 10 October 2022. Former prime minister Muhyiddin Yassin, started the convention of appointing senior ministers into his cabinet. The convention was maintained in the cabinet of his successor, Ismail Sabri Yaakob. His successor Anwar Ibrahim did not follow and instead appointed two deputy prime ministers in his cabinet and abolished the office of Senior Minister. According to Muhyiddin, the office was to deputise for the prime minister, similar to the duties of the deputy prime minister. Muhyiddin also named one of the four former senior minister Mohamed Azmin Ali as the acting prime minister during his absence during his term as the prime minister. However, during a brief period from 7 July 2021 until 16 August 2021 for 40 days, both offices coexisted. Muhyiddin Yassin promoted Ismail Sabri Yaakob to the deputy prime minister while promoting Hishammuddin Hussein to replace Ismail Sabri Yaakob as the senior minister and retaining all three other senior ministers on 7 July 2021, the coexistence ended after the collapse of the Muhyiddin Yassin administration on 16 August 2021 as after Ismail Sabri Yaakob became the prime minister, he did not appoint the deputy prime minister and only appointed senior minister.

== Appointment and power ==
The cabinet formed under former prime minister Muhyiddin Yassin in 2020, following the 2020–2022 Malaysian political crisis, was unique as there were no members of Parliament (MPs) appointed to the post of the deputy prime minister in his current cabinet. (Note: As of 7 July 2021, a Deputy Prime Minister has been appointed to his cabinet.) Instead, he appointed four senior ministers.

These senior ministers will assist the prime minister in carrying out his duties as prime minister, including chairing cabinet meetings during his absence. Although the four senior ministers were of equal standings, Mohamed Azmin Ali was designated by the prime minister to preside over the cabinet's meeting in his absence.

These positions were dissolved following the resignation of the cabinet after they had handed in their resignation to the Yang Di-Pertuan Agong on 16 August 2021.

== List of senior ministers of Malaysia ==
Colour key (for political parties):
Perikatan Nasional Barisan Nasional Gabungan Parti Sarawak

Portrait	Name (Birth–Death)	Political Party	Cluster	Term of office			Prime Minister
	Mohamed Azmin Ali محمد عزمين علي (born 1964); MP for Gombak	Perikatan Nasional (BERSATU)	Economics and Financial	10 March 2020	16 August 2021	1 year, 159 days	Muhyiddin Yassin
	Ismail Sabri Yaakob إسماعيل صبري يعقوب (born 1960); MP for Bera	Barisan Nasional (UMNO)	Security and Unity	10 March 2020	7 July 2021	1 year, 119 days	Muhyiddin Yassin
	Hishammuddin Hussein هشام الدين حسين (born 1961); MP for Sembrong	Barisan Nasional (UMNO)	Security and Unity	7 July 2021	16 August 2021	40 days	Muhyiddin Yassin
	Fadillah Yusof فضيلة يوسف (born 1962); MP for Petra Jaya	Gabungan Parti Sarawak (PBB)	Infrastructure Development	10 March 2020	16 August 2021	1 year, 159 days	Muhyiddin Yassin
	Mohd Radzi Md Jidin محمد راضي محمد جيدين (born 1977); Senator	Perikatan Nasional (BERSATU)	Education and Society	10 March 2020	16 August 2021	1 year, 159 days	Muhyiddin Yassin
	Mohamed Azmin Ali محمد عزمين علي (born 1964); MP for Gombak	Perikatan Nasional (BERSATU)	International Trade and Industry	30 August 2021	10 October 2022	1 year, 41 days	Ismail Sabri Yaakob
	Hishammuddin Hussein هشام الدين حسين (born 1961); MP for Sembrong	Barisan Nasional (UMNO)	Defence	30 August 2021	10 October 2022	1 year, 41 days	Ismail Sabri Yaakob
	Fadillah Yusof فضيلة يوسف (born 1962); MP for Petra Jaya	Gabungan Parti Sarawak (PBB)	Works	30 August 2021	10 October 2022	1 year, 41 days	Ismail Sabri Yaakob
	Mohd Radzi Md Jidin محمد راضي محمد جيدين (born 1977); Senator	Perikatan Nasional (BERSATU)	Education	30 August 2021	10 October 2022	1 year, 41 days	Ismail Sabri Yaakob

== See also ==
- Prime Minister of Malaysia
- Deputy Prime Minister of Malaysia
