= Hishammuddin Hussein =

Malaysian politician

Yang Berhormat Dato' Seri Hishammuddin Hussein SPMP SSAP SIMP SPDK DGSM PNBS DPMJ DSAP PPA PKN MP
- هشام الدين حسين
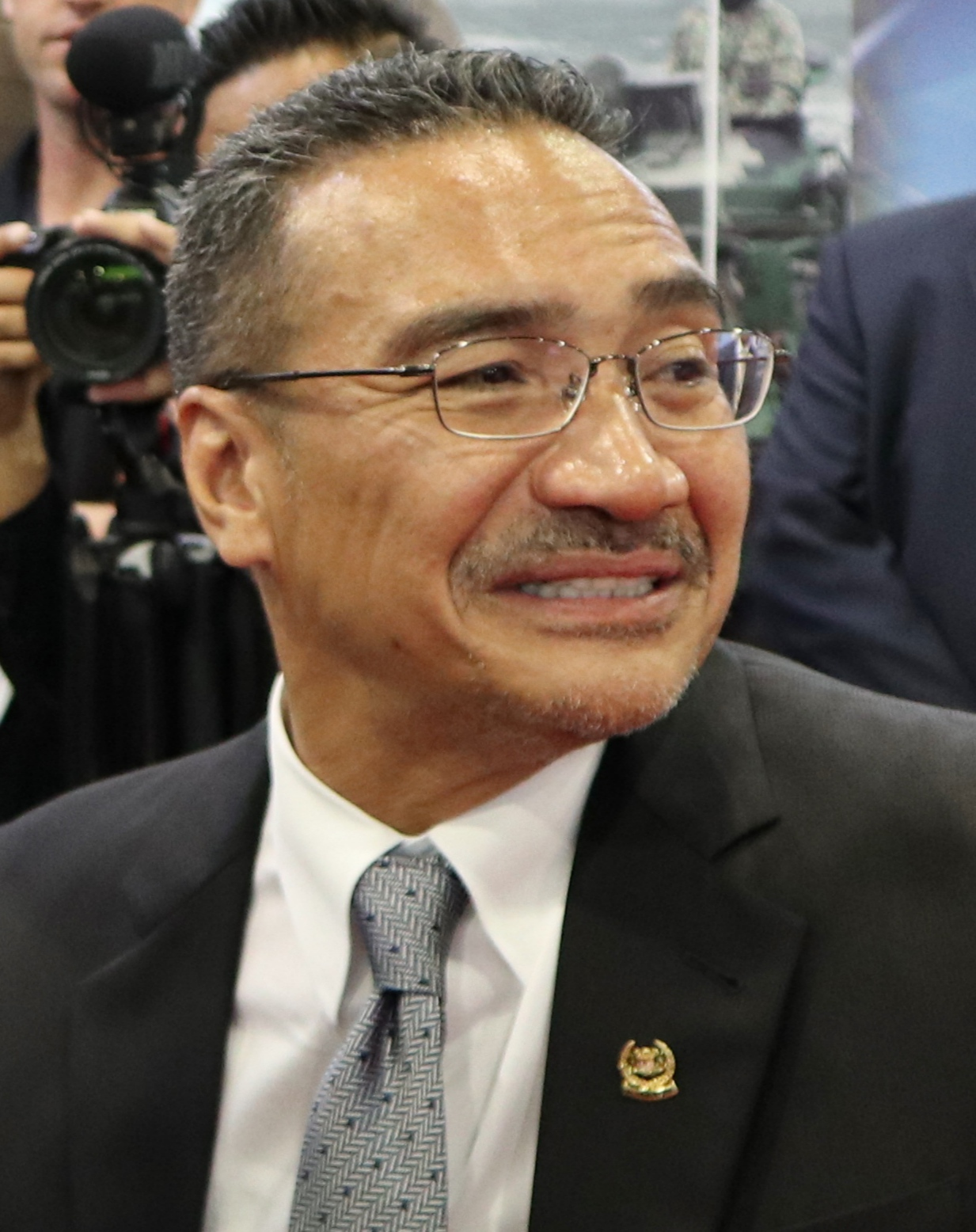
- Hishammuddin in 2018

Treasurer General of the Barisan Nasional
- In office 23 October 2019 – 27 April 2023
- Chairman: Ahmad Zahid Hamidi
- Preceded by: Tengku Adnan Tengku Mansor
- Succeeded by: Johari Abdul Ghani

Deputy President of the United Malays National Organisation
- Acting; 12 May 2018 – 30 June 2018
- President: Ahmad Zahid Hamidi (acting)
- Preceded by: Ahmad Zahid Hamidi (acting)
- Succeeded by: Mohamad Hasan

Vice President of the United Malays National Organisation
- In office 26 March 2009 – 30 June 2018
- President: Najib Razak; Ahmad Zahid Hamidi (acting)
- Preceded by: Mohd Ali Rustam
- Succeeded by: Mohamed Khaled Nordin

12th Youth Chief of the United Malays National Organisation
- In office 1999–2009
- President: Mahathir Mohamad; Abdullah Ahmad Badawi
- Preceded by: Ahmad Zahid Hamidi
- Succeeded by: Khairy Jamaluddin

Senior Minister of Security Cluster
- In office 30 August 2021 – 24 November 2022
- Monarch: Abdullah
- Prime Minister: Ismail Sabri Yaakob
- Preceded by: Himself
- Succeeded by: Position abolished
- In office 7 July 2021 – 16 August 2021
- Monarch: Abdullah
- Prime Minister: Muhyiddin Yassin
- Preceded by: Ismail Sabri Yaakob
- Succeeded by: Himself

Minister of Defence
- In office 30 August 2021 – 24 November 2022
- Monarch: Abdullah
- Prime Minister: Ismail Sabri Yaakob
- Preceded by: Ismail Sabri Yaakob
- Succeeded by: Mohamad Hasan
- In office 16 May 2013 – 10 May 2018
- Monarchs: Abdul Halim; Muhammad V
- Prime Minister: Najib Razak
- Preceded by: Ahmad Zahid Hamidi
- Succeeded by: Mohamad Sabu

Minister of Foreign Affairs
- In office 10 March 2020 – 16 August 2021
- Monarch: Abdullah
- Prime Minister: Muhyiddin Yassin
- Preceded by: Saifuddin Abdullah
- Succeeded by: Saifuddin Abdullah

Minister with Special Functions
- In office 12 April 2017 – 10 May 2018
- Monarch: Muhammad V
- Prime Minister: Najib Razak
- Preceded by: Position restored
- Succeeded by: Position vacated

Minister of Transport
- Acting; 16 May 2013 – 24 June 2014
- Monarch: Abdul Halim
- Prime Minister: Najib Razak
- Preceded by: Kong Cho Ha
- Succeeded by: Liow Tiong Lai

Minister of Home Affairs
- In office 10 April 2009 – 20 April 2013
- Monarchs: Mizan Zainal Abidin; Abdul Halim
- Prime Minister: Najib Razak
- Preceded by: Syed Hamid Albar
- Succeeded by: Ahmad Zahid Hamidi

Minister of Education
- In office 27 March 2004 – 10 April 2009
- Monarchs: Sirajuddin; Mizan Zainal Abidin
- Prime Minister: Abdullah Ahmad Badawi; Najib Razak
- Preceded by: Musa Mohamad
- Succeeded by: Muhyiddin Yassin

Minister of Youth and Sports
- In office 15 December 1999 – 26 March 2004
- Monarchs: Salahuddin; Sirajuddin
- Prime Minister: Mahathir Mohamad; Abdullah Ahmad Badawi
- Preceded by: Muhyiddin Yassin
- Succeeded by: Azalina Othman Said

Deputy Minister of Primary Industries
- In office 12 November 1996 – 14 December 1999
- Monarchs: Ja'afar; Salahuddin
- Prime Minister: Mahathir Mohamad
- Minister: Lim Keng Yaik
- Preceded by: Siti Zainaboon Abu Bakar
- Succeeded by: Anifah Aman

Member of the Malaysian Parliament for Sembrong
- Incumbent
- Assumed office 21 March 2004
- Preceded by: Constituency established
- Majority: 16,978 (2004); 11,570 (2008); 10,631 (2013); 6,662 (2018); 10,880 (2022)

Member of the Malaysian Parliament for Tenggara
- In office 25 April 1995 – 21 March 2004
- Preceded by: Constituency established
- Succeeded by: Adham Baba
- Majority: 24,518 (1995); 20,817 (1999)

Personal details
- Born: Hishammuddin bin Hussein; 5 August 1961 (age 65) Johor Bahru, Johor, Federation of Malaya (now Malaysia)
- Party: United Malays National Organisation (UMNO) (Note: Suspended membership from UMNO from 27 January 2023 to 17 April 2026.)
- Other political affiliations: Barisan Nasional (BN)
- Spouse: Tengku Marsilla Tengku Abdullah (m. 1987)
- Relations: Jaafar Muhammad (great-grandfather); Onn Jaafar (grandfather); Mohamed Noah Omar (grandfather); Onn Hafiz Ghazi (nephew); Abdul Razak Hussein (uncle); Najib Razak (cousin); Yahya Awang (brother-in-law)
- Children: 4
- Parent(s): Hussein Onn (father); Suhailah Noah (mother)
- Education: Malay College Kuala Kangsar; St. John's Institution; Alice Smith School; Cheltenham College
- Alma mater: Aberystwyth University (LLB); London School of Economics (LLM)
- Occupation: Politician
- Profession: Lawyer

Hishammuddin bin Hussein (Jawi: هشام الدين بن حسين; born 5 August 1961) is a Malaysian politician and lawyer who served as Senior Minister of the Security Cluster and Minister of Defence from 2021 to 2022. A member of the United Malays National Organisation (UMNO), a component party of the Barisan Nasional (BN) coalition, he has been a Member of Parliament (MP) for Sembrong since 2004, having previously been an MP for Tenggara from 1995 to 2004.

Hishammuddin was born in Johor Bahru to Hussein Onn and Suhailah Noah. His father was the third prime minister of Malaysia. He attended Malay College Kuala Kangsar, St. John's Institution, Alice Smith School, and Cheltenham College. He then graduated with a Bachelor of Laws from Aberystwyth University and a Master of Laws from the London School of Economics before working as a lawyer. After making partner at Skrine, he started his own firm, Lee Hishammuddin, which later merged with Allen and Gledhill to form Lee Hishammuddin Allen and Gledhill.

On his return from the UK, Hishammuddin joined UMNO. He was first elected to the Dewan Rakyat in the 1995 election, winning the seat of Tenggara. He was later appointed deputy minister and was promoted to full minister in 1999. In 1999, he was elected as UMNO's youth chief, and subsequently as its vice president in 2009. Since then, he has held various ministerial positions until the defeat of BN in the 2018 election. Despite the defeat, he managed to retain his Sembrong seat.

At the beginning of the political crisis that started in 2020, Hishammuddin returned to the cabinet as Minister of Foreign Affairs under the Perikatan Nasional (PN) coalition led by Muhyiddin Yassin. Amid the worsening political crisis in July 2021, Muhyiddin appointed Hishammuddin as Senior Minister of Security Cluster to replace Ismail Sabri Yaakob, who was appointed Deputy Prime Minister. He briefly served in the office until August 2021, after Muhyiddin announced his resignation. Two weeks after that, Hishammuddin returned again to the cabinet under the new prime minister Ismail Sabri, who re-appointed him as senior minister. He was also appointed the Minister of Defence, an office he had held previously from 2013 to 2018.

== Early life and education ==
Hishammuddin was born on 5 August 1961, the fourth child and the eldest son of Hussein Onn, who became the third Prime Minister of Malaysia, and Suhaila Noah. He is the grandson of Onn Jaafar, a prominent Malay leader and the founder of the United Malays National Organisation (UMNO), whose mother was a Circassian and born in the Ottoman Empire.

Hishammuddin attended the Malay College Kuala Kangsar before his father became Deputy Prime Minister in 1973. Upon his father's appointment to the office, he attended St. John's Institution, and then the Alice Smith School, in Kuala Lumpur, before attending the English public school Cheltenham College in Gloucestershire.

Hishammuddin graduated with a Bachelor of Laws (LLB) degree from the University of Wales, Aberystwyth, in 1984. He also attended the London School of Economics and received a Master of Laws (LLM) degree in Commercial and Corporate Law in 1988.

== Early career ==
After completing his studies in UK, Hishammuddin returned to Malaysia in 1989. He joined UMNO and began his career as a lawyer. He became a partner of Skrine & Co (present day Skrine), the largest law firm in Malaysia. In 1993, he left Skrine & Co to set up his own law firm with Thomas Mun Lung Lee, and the established law firm was known as Lee Hishammuddin (present day Lee Hishammuddin Allen & Gledhill).

== Political career ==
Hishammuddin rose through the ranks of UMNO's youth wing in the 1990s, becoming its national chief in 1998. He assumed the position at a time when UMNO Youth had been torn apart by the sacking of Deputy Prime Minister Anwar Ibrahim, who was popular among young UMNO members. Hishammuddin's predecessor, Ahmad Zahid Hamidi, had been a core supporter of Anwar.

In 1995, Hishammuddin had been elected to the federal parliament for the Johor-based seat of Tenggara. He was immediately appointed as Parliamentary Secretary for International Trade and Industry in the government of Mahathir Mohamad. His rise to the leadership of UMNO Youth in 1998 coincided with his elevation to the full ministry the following year, as the Minister for Youth and Sport. He retained his parliamentary seat in the 1999 election.

In 2004, the Barisan Nasional government, now led by Abdullah Badawi, was returned to power with Hishammuddin holding the newly created seat of Sembrong. Hishammuddin was re-elected as the leader of UMNO Youth and appointed Minister for Education.

In 2009, the resignation of Abdullah Badawi as prime minister caused a shake-up in UMNO's senior leadership. Najib Razak, Hishammuddin's cousin, became UMNO's president and the prime minister, Muhyiddin Yassin became Najib's deputy in both the party and the government, and the three UMNO vice-presidencies were up for election. Hishammuddin, vacating the leadership of UMNO Youth, contested the vice-presidencies, finishing in second place in an eight-man field. His ascension to the party's vice-presidency in turn guaranteed him a senior Cabinet post, and he was appointed Minister for Home Affairs.

After the 2013 election, in which Najib's government suffered further losses, especially among Chinese voters, Hishammuddin recontested the UMNO vice-presidency. He was barely re-elected in third place, finishing nine votes ahead of Mukhriz Mahathir. He switched ministries with Zahid, taking over the latter's portfolio of Defence. He also assumed the transport ministry on an acting basis; that ministry was normally reserved for the Malaysian Chinese Association, which had decided to withdraw from the Cabinet temporarily, having endured significant losses in the general election. As acting transport minister he was thrust into the international spotlight as the minister responsible for the investigation into the disappearance of Malaysia Airlines Flight 370. The Sydney Morning Herald criticised Hishammuddin in this position, arguing that he had "struggled during daily press briefings to defend his country’s handling of the search and investigation". Najib, however, defended Hishammuddin's performance. His role ceased in June 2014, when Liow Tiong Lai assumed the ministry. Hishammuddin retained his substantive post as defence minister.

In April 2017, Hishammuddin was appointed Minister in the Prime Minister's Department for Special Functions. Prime Minister Najib Razak said that the appointment would enable Hishammuddin to carry out duties other than his responsibilities as Minister of Defence, he still however would remain as Minister for Defence.

In March 2020, Hishammuddin was appointed Minister of Foreign Affairs by newly appointed prime minister Muhyiddin Yassin following the collapse of the previous Pakatan Harapan Government in February.

== Controversies and issues ==
=== Keris Incident ===
In his second term as UMNO Youth's leader, Hishammuddin sparked controversy by brandishing the keris, a Malay sword and symbol of Malay nationalism, at UMNO's 2005 annual general meeting. In response to concerns over the racial rhetoric, Vice-president Tan Sri Muhyiddin Yassin said that "Although some sides were a bit extreme [this year], it is quite normal to voice feelings during the assembly." The racially provocative act was criticized by opposition politicians as well as some Chinese politicians from the Barisan Nasional coalition. In 2008, Hishammuddin conceded that the act had caused the coalition to lose support among non-Malay voters in that year's general election.

=== Vaping in the Dewan Rakyat ===
On 6 August 2020, Hishammuddin apologised after being caught vaping during a Parliament session.

=== Big brother controversy ===
On 2 April 2021, Hishammuddin's two-day working visit to China was overshadowed by a diplomatic gaffe. Opposition Leader Anwar Ibrahim criticised Hishammuddin for calling China a "big brother" during his joint address with his Chinese counterpart Minister Wang Yi. Anwar also said the comment may have set Malaysia's foreign policy back by 25 years.

On 3 April 2021, Hishammuddin defended using the term “Big Brother” to refer to Wang Yi, saying it was a sign of respect. Former foreign minister Anifah Aman has told Hishammuddin to admit his error in making a "big brother" reference to China, instead of compounding the matter by disputing it.

=== 51% Bumiputra Logistic Equity Control Policy ===
On 27 September 2021, the cabinet of Malaysia has sparked criticism after Hishammuddin announced a new equity policy for Bumiputera companies under the five-year development plan, Twelfth Malaysia Plan (12MP), which was tabled by him in Parliament. The policy is said to ensure sustainable equity holdings by Bumiputera, an equity safety net would be launched to guarantee that the sale of shares or Bumiputera firms would only be sold to Bumiputera companies, consortiums or individuals. Syed Saddiq mentioned that the new rulings were unfair as they would be tantamount to taking equity from the non-bumiputeras and giving them to bumiputera. Former Health Minister, Dzulkefly Ahmad had also described the policy as "suicidal" and claimed that the new policy would only kill the Bumiputera companies economically if that is their intention. He also said that based on the feedback from Malay businessmen, most were against the idea of the new Bumiputera-only policy being implemented. Ismail Sabri announced it after revealing that the government's target to raise Bumiputera equity ownership to 30% had yet to be achieved. He also announced fundings to improve Bumiputera businesses’ sustainability to hit 15% contribution in gross domestic product (GDP) by Bumiputera micro, small and medium enterprises by 2025.

== Personal life ==
In 1986, Hussein married Tengku Marsilla Tengku Abdullah, a princess from the state of Pahang. They reside in Kuala Lumpur, the couple has two sons and two daughters (Kyra Arianna, Faris, Fahd, and Nasha Alyssa).

=== Health ===
On 22 February 2022, Hussein tested positive for COVID-19 and he had experienced "very mild" symptoms amid the Omicron infection surge in Malaysia.

== Election results ==
Parliament of Malaysia
| Year | Constituency | Candidate | Votes | Pct | Opponents | Votes | Pct | Ballots cast | Majority | Turnout |
|---|---|---|---|---|---|---|---|---|---|---|
| 1995 | P136 Tenggara | Hishammuddin Hussein (UMNO) | 28,727 | 87.22% | Madin Khani @ Md. Din A. Ghani (S46) | 4,209 | 12.78% | 34,782 | 24,518 | 63.36% |
| 1999 | P136 Tenggara | Hishammuddin Hussein (UMNO) | 28,376 | 78.96% | Lokman Noor Adam (keADILan) | 7,559 | 21.04% | 37,829 | 20,817 | 78.06% |
| 2004 | P153 Sembrong | Hishammuddin Hussein (UMNO) | 19,575 | 88.29% | Onn Jaafar (PAS) | 2,597 | 11.71% | 22,956 | 16,978 | 74.61% |
| 2008 | P153 Sembrong | Hishammuddin Hussein (UMNO) | 17,988 | 73.70% | Lee Sang (PKR) | 6,418 | 26.30% | 25,211 | 11,570 | 75.98% |
| 2013 | P153 Sembrong | Hishammuddin Hussein (UMNO) | 22,841 | 65.17% | Onn Abu Bakar (PKR) | 12,210 | 34.83% | 35,910 | 10,631 | 86.35% |
| 2018 | P153 Sembrong | Hishammuddin Hussein (UMNO) | 21,353 | 59.24% | Onn Abu Bakar (PKR) | 14,691 | 40.76% | 36,044 | 6,662 | 83.02% |
| 2022 | P153 Sembrong | Hishammuddin Hussein (UMNO) | 22,572 | 55.15% | Hasni Abas (PKR) | 11,692 | 28.57% | 40,930 | 10,880 | 74.44% |
| 2022 | P153 Sembrong | Hishammuddin Hussein (UMNO) | 22,572 | 55.15% | Aziz Ismail (BERSATU) | 6,666 | 16.29% | 40,930 | 10,880 | 74.44% |

== Honours ==
=== Honours of Malaysia ===
- Malaysia
  - Recipient of the General Service Medal (PPA)
  - Recipient of the National Sovereignty Medal (PKN) (2014)
  - Recipient of the 11th Yang di-Pertuan Agong Installation Medal (1999)
  - Recipient of the 12th Yang di-Pertuan Agong Installation Medal (2002)
  - Recipient of the 13th Yang di-Pertuan Agong Installation Medal (2007)
  - Recipient of the 14th Yang di-Pertuan Agong Installation Medal (2012)
  - Recipient of the 15th Yang di-Pertuan Agong Installation Medal (2017)
  - Recipient of the 16th Yang di-Pertuan Agong Installation Medal (2019)
  - Recipient of the 17th Yang di-Pertuan Agong Installation Medal (2024)
- Johor
  - Knight Commander of the Order of the Crown of Johor (DPMJ) – Dato' (1996)
- Malacca
  - Grand Commander of the Exalted Order of Malacca (DGSM) – Datuk Seri (2014)
- Pahang
  - Knight Grand Companion of the Order of Sultan Ahmad Shah of Pahang (SSAP) – Dato' Sri (2004)
  - Knight Grand Companion of the Order of the Crown of Pahang (SIMP) – formerly Dato', now Dato' Indera (2002)
  - Knight Companion of the Order of Sultan Ahmad Shah of Pahang (DSAP) – Dato' (1998)
- Perlis
  - Knight Grand Commander of the Order of the Crown of Perlis (SPMP) – Dato' Seri (2007)
- Sabah
  - Grand Commander of the Order of Kinabalu (SPDK) – Datuk Seri Panglima (2011)
- Sarawak
  - Knight Commander of the Most Exalted Order of the Star of Sarawak (PNBS) – Dato Sri (2013)

=== Foreign honours ===
- Bahrain
  - Medal of First Degree – (2017)

== See also ==
- Tenggara (federal constituency)
- Sembrong (federal constituency)
