= Ismail Sabri Yaakob =

Prime Minister of Malaysia from 2021 to 2022

Yang Berhormat Dato' Sri Dr. Ismail Sabri Yaakob SSAP DP DUNM SPDK DGSM DIMP DMSM ADK MP
- اسماعيل صبري يعقوب
- Ismail Sabri in 2026

9th Prime Minister of Malaysia
- In office 21 August 2021 – 10 October 2022; Caretaker: 10 October – 24 November 2022
- Monarch: Abdullah
- Deputy: None
- Preceded by: Muhyiddin Yassin
- Succeeded by: Anwar Ibrahim

15th Leader of the Opposition
- In office 12 March 2019 – 24 February 2020
- Prime Minister: Mahathir Mohamad
- Preceded by: Ahmad Zahid Hamidi
- Succeeded by: Anwar Ibrahim

Vice President of UMNO
- In office 30 June 2018 – 18 March 2023 Serving with Mahdzir Khalid & Mohamed Khaled Nordin
- Preceded by: Ahmad Zahid Hamidi
- Succeeded by: Wan Rosdy Wan Ismail
Ministerial portfolios
2008 – 2009	Youth and Sports
2009 – 2013	Domestic Trade, Cooperatives and Consumerism
2013 – 2015	Agriculture and Agro-based Industry
2015 – 2018	Minister of Rural and Regional Development
2020 – 2021	Minister of Defence
2020 – 2021	Senior Minister
2021	Deputy Prime Minister
Parliamentary offices
Member of the Malaysian Parliament for Bera
Incumbent
Assumed office 21 March 2004
Preceded by	Constituency established
Majority	4,982 (2004); 4,313 (2008); 2,143 (2013); 2,311 (2018); 16,695 (2022)

Personal details
- Born: Ismail Sabri bin Yaakob; 18 January 1960 (age 66) Temerloh, Pahang, Federation of Malaya
- Party: UMNO (1987–present)
- Other political affiliations: Barisan Nasional (1987–present); Muafakat Nasional (2019–2022); Perikatan Nasional (2020–2022)
- Spouse: Muhaini Zainal Abidin (m. 1986)
- Children: 4
- Relatives: Kamarazaman Yaakob (older brother)
- Education: University of Malaya (LLB); Universiti Utara Malaysia (PhD)
- Occupation: Politician; lawyer
- Ismail Sabri's voice Excerpt from a recording of Ismail Sabri's voice. Recorded on 29 Nov 2021.

Ismail Sabri bin Yaakob (Jawi: اسماعيل صبري بن يعقوب; born 18 January 1960) is a Malaysian politician and lawyer who was the ninth prime minister of Malaysia from 2021 to 2022. A member of UMNO, he served as Member of Parliament (MP) for Bera since 2004. Ismail previously was the deputy prime minister in 2021.

Born in Pahang, Ismail started his career as a lawyer. He became active in UMNO before entering the Parliament of Malaysia as the Member of Parliament for Bera in 2004. Currently, he is the Division Chief of Bera of UMNO, a component party of the Barisan Nasional (BN) coalition. He also served as the vice president of UMNO from June 2018 to March 2023. As a result from the 2020–2022 Malaysian political crisis, he was formally appointed and sworn in as prime minister on 21 August 2021 following the resignation of his predecessor Muhyiddin Yassin.

Ismail served in several cabinet positions in the BN administration under former Prime Ministers Abdullah Ahmad Badawi and Najib Razak, from March 2008 to its 2018 general election loss. He was the 15th Leader of the Opposition in the Pakatan Harapan (PH) administration from March 2019 to its collapse in February 2020 amid the 2020 Malaysian political crisis. In the PN government, he was prominent in the country's response to the COVID-19 pandemic in his roles as Senior Minister for Security, and later during a 40-day stint as Deputy Prime Minister. He led a faction of his party (UMNO) that continued supporting Prime Minister Muhyiddin Yassin in June 2021, when the party withdrew its support over the government's handling of the pandemic. After this culminated in the collapse of the government and Muhyiddin's resignation, he successfully entered negotiations to become prime minister in August 2021 after garnering the support of the most MPs. As Prime Minister, Ismail Sabri lifted the Movement Control Order following the expansion of the vaccination programme and oversaw the Twelfth Malaysia Plan. During his tenure, the constitution was amended to grant equal status to the states of East Malaysia. His term ended after a decisive loss of his party at the 2022 general election.

Ismail Sabri has attracted controversy for his comments in support of ethnic Malay pre-eminence in Malaysia.

== Early life and education ==
Ismail Sabri was born in Temerloh, Pahang, Malaysia. His parents are Yaakob Abdul Rahman and Wan Jah Wan Mamat who were originally from Kelantan. His father worked as a rubber tapper. His education began in 1967 at Sekolah Kebangsaan Bangau, followed by Sekolah Menengah Air Putih in Kuantan in 1973, and Sekolah Menengah Teknik Kuantan in 1976. He was a hawker when he was in primary school, selling limes on the roadside and fish at Pekan Sehari market, Temerloh.

After graduating from form six at Jaya Akademik, he continued his studies at the University of Malaya majoring in law in 1980. The title of his Bachelor of Laws (LLB) thesis is "Treatment of political detainees in Malaysia" ("Layanan terhadap tahanan politik di Malaysia"). This drew on the experiences of his older brother, Kamarazaman Yaakob, a leftist student leader who was detained without trial.

== Early career ==
In 1985, Ismail began his legal career as a lawyer. He was then appointed as a Member of the Temerloh District Council in 1987 and a Member of the Temerloh Municipal Council in 1996. In 1995, he was appointed Political Secretary to the Minister of Culture, Arts and Tourism, Sabbaruddin Chik. He also was appointed to the Board of Directors of the Pahang Tenggara Board (DARA) in 1995 as well as the Malaysian Tourism Promotion Board in the same year. Before entering Parliament in 2004, Ismail Sabri served as Chairman of the National Sports Complex.

== Early political career ==
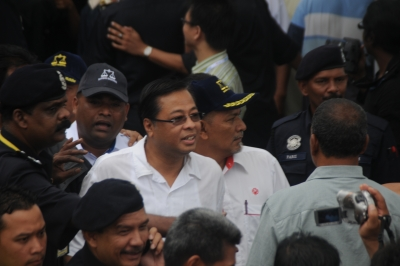
Ismail during the 2009 Bagan Pinang by-election campaign

Following Ismail's appointment as a Member of the Temerloh Division UMNO Committee in 1987, he held several positions such as Temerloh Division UMNO Information Chief in 1988, Temerloh Division UMNO Youth Chief in 1993, and Temerloh Division UMNO Deputy Chief in 2001. He was appointed as inaugural Bera Division UMNO Chief in 2004 following the border redelineation process for parliamentary constituencies. Ismail Sabri was elected to Parliament in the 2004 general election, becoming the first MP for the new seat of Bera.

== Ministerial career (2008–2018, 2020–2021) ==
=== Minister for Youth and Sports (2008–2009) ===
Ismail Sabri was re-elected in 2008 general election, and was appointed in the third cabinet of former Prime Minister Abdullah Ahmad Badawi as Minister for Youth and Sports. He served in the position from 2008 to 2009 for a year when Abdullah resigned as prime minister and was replaced by Najib Razak who switched Ismail Sabri to another ministerial portfolio.

=== Minister for Domestic Trade, Co-operatives and Consumerism (2009–2013) ===
In April 2009, under new Prime Minister Najib Razak Ismail became the Minister for Domestic Trade, Co-operatives and Consumerism (2009–2013).

The Malaysia Competition Act of 2010 was introduced under Ismail's tenure to regulate competition in the private sector. He also introduced the Menu Rakyat 1Malaysia (MR1M) program in 2011 that aims to help the people get food at affordable prices. As of February 2012, 1,314 food premises across the country were participating in the program.

=== Minister for Agriculture and Agro-Based Industry (2013–2015) ===
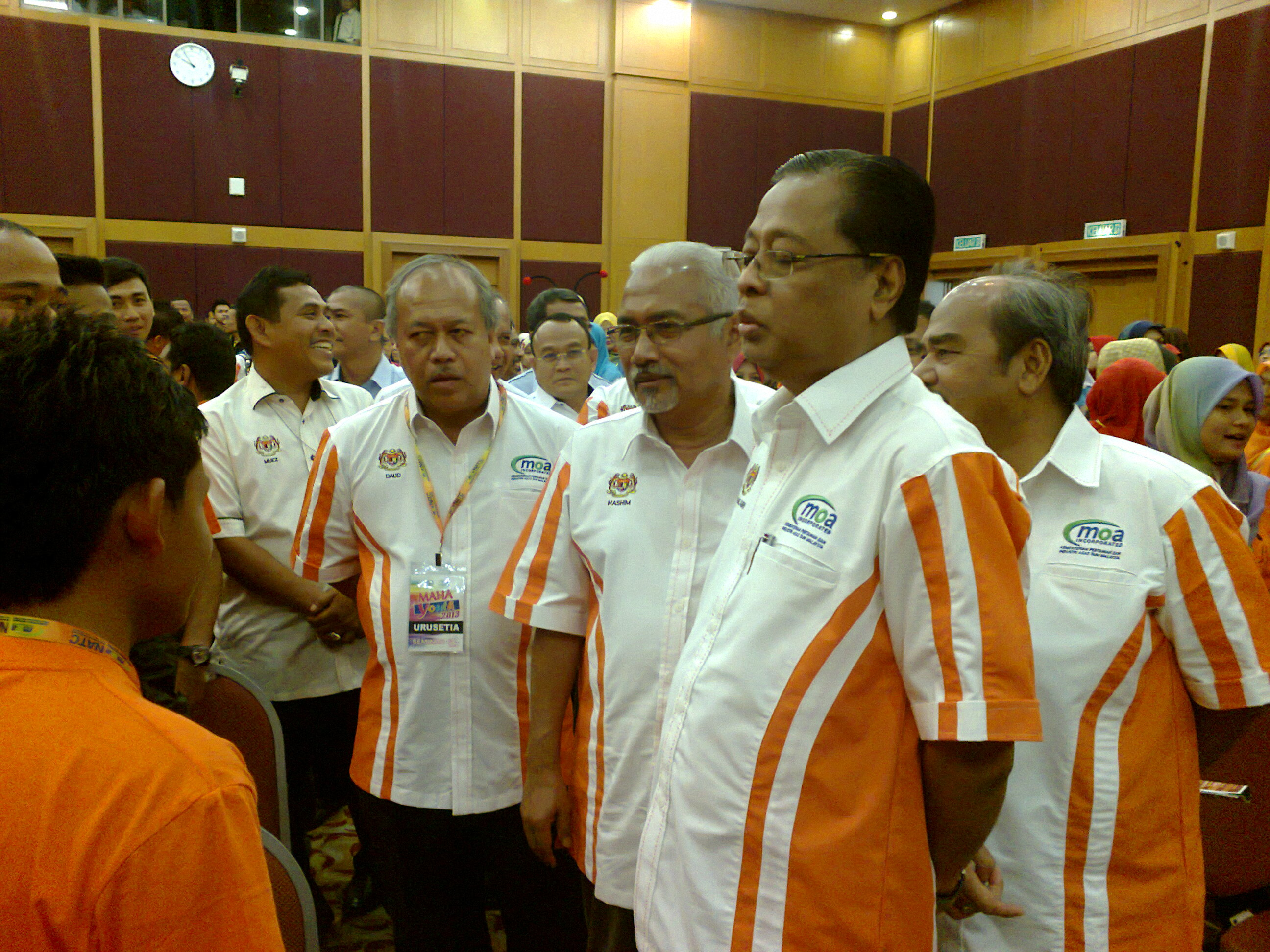
Ismail during Putrajaya MAHA Youth Carnival 2013.

After the 2013 general election, in which Ismail retained his parliamentary seat, he was appointed as the Minister for Agriculture and Agro-Based Industry (2013–2015).

Ismail's ministry has introduced the 'Jihad Against the Middlemen' (Malay: Jihad Memerangi Orang Tengah) initiative which aims to eliminate the role of middlemen in the agriculture sector. Produce from the three agriculture sub-sectors, namely paddy, fisheries, and vegetables and fruits, are marketed directly to consumers through various platforms including Paddy Purchasing Center (Pusat Belian Padi), Fishermen's Market (Pasar Nelayan), Farmers' Market (Pasar Tani), and Agrobazaar Kedai Rakyat. Public Service Department of Malaysia claims that the income of crop farmers, fishermen, and livestock producers have increased as a result of this initiative, while consumers can obtain fresh products at lower prices than those offered in the public market (pasar awam).

=== Minister of Rural and Regional Development (2015–2018) ===
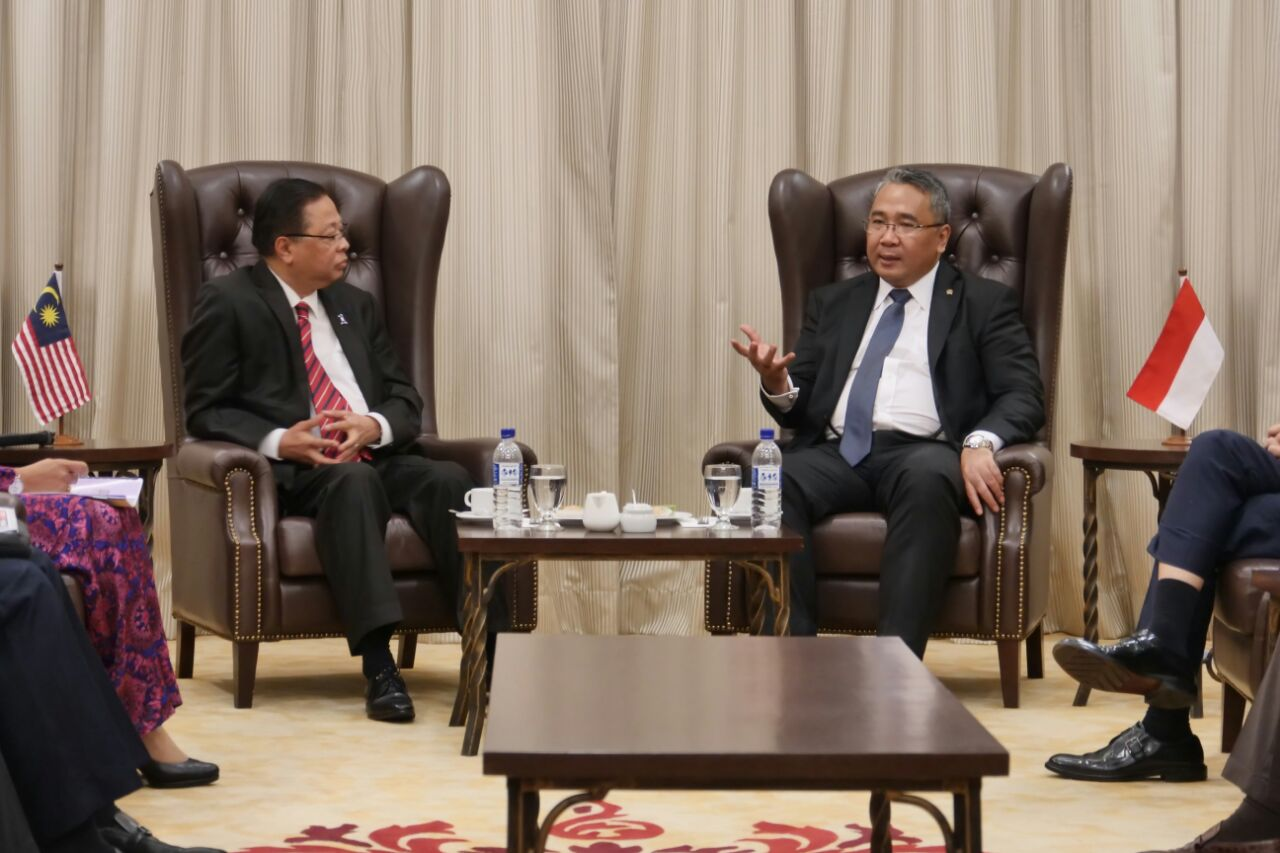
Ismail with the Minister of Villages, Disadvantaged Regions and Transmigration of the Indonesia, Eko Putro Sandjojo in Kuala Lumpur, 2018.

Ismail Sabri was appointed as the Minister of Rural and Regional Development (2015–2018) after July 2015 cabinet reshuffle.

Ismail's ministry launched Rural Urbanization (Malay: Membandarkan Luar Bandar) initiative in November 2015 to address people's needs and wants while keeping the rural development process on track. To encourage the younger generation to continue living and building their future in rural areas, basic rural infrastructure is expanded, particularly in underserved areas such as Sabah and Sarawak, as well as rural areas in peninsular Malaysia, including Orang Asli areas.

During Ismail's tenure in this position, Ismail came up with the concept of Mara Digital Malls in August 2015, which are essentially malls that sell IT products, but only from Bumiputera vendors. The initiative was intended to enable more Bumiputra traders to sell digital goods and IT gadgets, with lower rents than existing IT centres. Traders were given a six-month rental subsidy to establish themselves.

=== Senior Minister (Security Cluster) and Minister of Defence (2020–2021) ===
In March 2020 following the change from PH to PN government, Ismail was appointed as Senior Minister of Malaysia (Security Cluster) and Minister of Defence under new Prime Minister, Muhyiddin Yassin to serve in the PN cabinet. His tenure involved conducting daily briefings related to security issues during the COVID-19 pandemic, including those related to Movement Control Order (MCO) restrictions. He criticised Al Jazeera for a documentary about treatment of immigrants during the MCO, demanding the network apologise for what he alleged was "false reporting". During the 2020 Sabah state election, Ismail Sabri told the press that voters who had travelled to Sabah to vote from other states would not need to quarantine upon their return.

== Vice President of UMNO (2018–2023) ==
After the defeat of BN and UMNO in the 2018 general election, Ismail contested for the UMNO vice-presidency in the subsequent 2018 UMNO leadership election on 30 June 2018 and won by the highest number of votes ahead of two other winners with lower number of votes, who are former Minister of Education Mahdzir Khalid and former Menteri Besar of Johor Mohamed Khaled Nordin. As he was the most-voted among the three party vice presidents, he is also the highest-ranking party vice president as the party first vice president. He is ranked the third after party president Ahmad Zahid Hamidi and party deputy president Mohamad Hasan. On 20 December 2018, he was tasked to cover the duties and act as the party deputy president in place of Mohamad who was covering the duties and acting as the party president during the period when Ahmad Zahid took the "garden leave" for over half of a year from December 2018 to June 2019. On 26 February 2023, he confirmed that he would only seek reelection as the Division Chief of Bera and not as the Vice President of UMNO in the 2023 UMNO elections. Following that, he stepped down as the Vice President of UMNO on 18 March 2023 after his replacement Wan Rosdy Wan Ismail was elected.

=== Power struggle with Ahmad Zahid ===
Ahmad Zahid has repeatedly called for the next Malaysian general election to be held as soon as possible while Ismail Sabri remains uninterested and undecided on the issue. However, Ismail Sabri also promised to hold the election when the "time is right" and when he is confident that BN will win it and return to power. On 17 September 2022, he added that the election would not be too far away and reiterated that he would set the election date with four other top leaders of UMNO besides him who are the president, deputy president and two other vice presidents. Ahmad Zahid however, reaffirmed his strong stance for the election to be held as soon as possible or better immediately. Although having been named as the prime minister candidate of BN in the 2022 general election, the opposition has repeatedly accused that BN would not honour its promise of renominating its Member of the Supreme Council and incumbent Prime Minister Ismail Sabri as the prime minister if the coalition wins the election. Instead of him, the coalition would nominate its Chairman, higher-ranking and more senior Ahmad Zahid, who was also facing corruption court charges. However, Ismail Sabri has denied and played down the accusations, stressing that they were false and he would remain prime minister. He justified that the issue had been decided in the UMNO general assembly and even to the extent of branch meetings, where majority of the branches supported his reappointment to the position after the election and party presidents of other BN component parties namely the Malaysian Chinese Association (MCA), Malaysian Indian Congress (MIC) and Parti Bersatu Rakyat Sabah (PBRS) have also agreed with the decision.

== Leader of the Opposition (2019–2020) ==
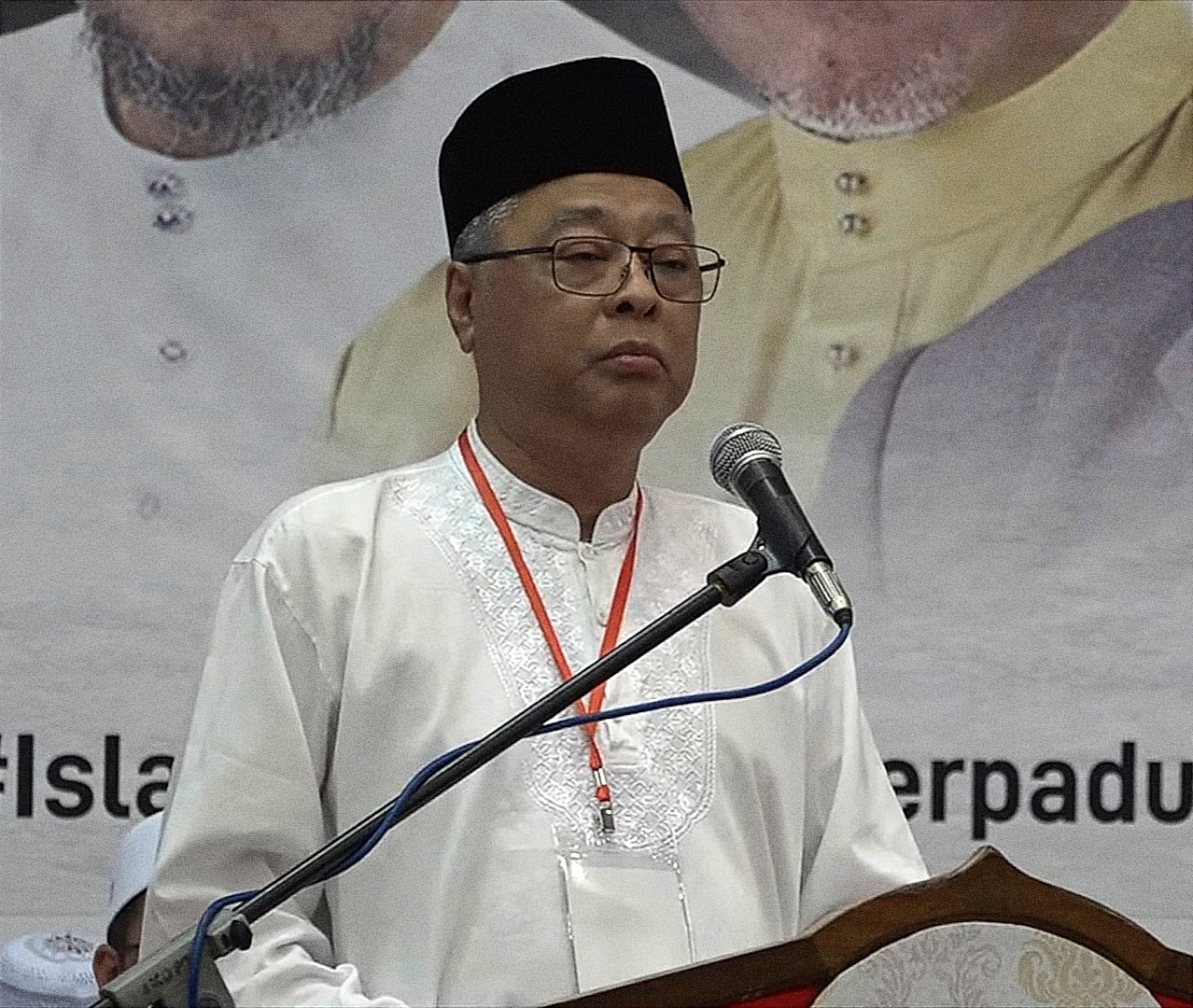
Ismail Sabri delivering a speech in 2019

In March 2019, Ahmad Zahid stepped down as the Leader of the Opposition. The position of Ismail Sabri as the UMNO first vice president has allowed him to be appointed to replace Ahmad Zahid instead of UMNO deputy president Mohamad Hasan. Although Mohamad is ranked higher than Ismail Sabri as the UMNO deputy president, he was not an elected MP and did not satisfy the criteria to be appointed to the position.

== Deputy Prime Minister (2021) ==
In July 2021, Ismail was appointed as Deputy Prime Minister of Malaysia by Prime Minister Muhyiddin Yassin while retaining his substantive post as the Defence Minister. He was replaced by Dato' Seri Hishammuddin Hussein as Senior Minister of Malaysia (security cluster). The reshuffle was interpreted by media as a tactic for Muhyiddin to ease tensions within Perikatan Nasional by promoting UMNO figures into positions of power, as some members in the party had begun to challenge Muhyiddin's leadership.

Ismail Sabri spearheaded a faction of UMNO that continued to support Prime Minister Muhyiddin Yassin in July 2021, despite a substantial proportion of the party withdrawing its support over his government's handling of the COVID-19 pandemic. This split the party and led to uncertainty as to whether Muhyiddin continued to harbour majority support.

Subsequent to Muhyiddin's resignation as prime minister on 16 August 2021 after the loss of the government's majority amid the ongoing political crisis, his cabinet was dissolved. At 40 days of service, Ismail Sabri is to date the shortest-serving Deputy Prime Minister of Malaysia.

== Prime Minister (2021–2022) ==
=== Appointment ===
Ismail Sabri was appointed as the 9th Prime Minister of Malaysia by the Yang di-Pertuan Agong after being satisfied that he had commanded the confidence of the majority in Parliament, with a total of 114 from 220 members of the Dewan Rakyat nominating him in accordance with Article 40(2)(a) and Article 43(2)(a) of the Federal Constitution. He was formally sworn in as Prime Minister at the Istana Negara on 21 August 2021. He is the third person to be appointed as PM during the tumultuous period of 14th Malaysian Parliament, which has the most turnover of prime ministers in a single term. With his appointment as prime minister, the Barisan Nasional (BN) and UMNO which dominated the politics of Malaysia for more than six decades from the independence in 1957 to 2018, came back to power and regained the premiership to lead the administration. It was only three years after Najib Razak's election defeat in the 2018 Malaysian general election amid the 1MDB corruption scandal. Leader of the Opposition Anwar Ibrahim said that the Opposition needed to serve harder as effective check and balance against the government. However, an online petition was launched against his appointment as prime minister, having garnered more than 350,000 signatures as of 21 August 2021.

The following day after Ismail's appointment, 22 August 2021, he viewed flood-hit areas in his first official visit as PM and made his maiden and inaugural address and speech to the nation to introduce "Malaysian Family" (Keluarga Malaysia) concept, which is the theme of his administration aimed at uniting all parties of the nation to overcome the COVID-19 pandemic, he invited the Opposition to be part of the National Recovery Council (NRC), appealed to all Members of Parliament (MPs) to work together to help the nation and added that another six million COVID-19 vaccine doses were expected to arrive in early September 2021. There have been debates over the name of his administration, some labelled it as Perikatan Nasional (PN) administration, same as the Muhyiddin administration, as the member parties of his cabinet are the same as the previous Muhyiddin cabinet and PN is the governing coalition which holds the most seats in parliament and cabinet but some labelled it as BN administration as BN holds the highest political power and position of prime minister which leads the administration.

=== Domestic affairs ===
On 23 October 2021, Ismail began his first and working trip to Sarawak after his appointment as prime minister and told in a press conference after visiting the Petra Jaya Hospital project site that he did not hope the practice of appointing rescue contractors to persist and instead called for closer monitoring of government projects from the beginning to ensure they are completed according to the schedule. In addition, he also told to set up "Yayasan Keluarga Malaysia" (Malaysian Family Foundation) to support children orphaned by COVID-19 when launching the "Keluarga Malaysia" concept at Borneo Convention Centre in Kuching.

==== Bipartisan efforts ====
On 13 September 2021, the fourth session of the Parliament, first under Ismail's administration, was opened by the Yang di-Pertuan Agong Abdullah with a traditional royal address at the Dewan Rakyat, he and four leaders of the Pakatan Harapan (PH), the largest opposition coalition, namely Anwar Ibrahim, Leader of the Opposition and President of the People's Justice Party (PKR), Lim Guan Eng, Secretary-General of the Democratic Action Party (DAP), Mohamad Sabu, President of the National Trust Party (AMANAH) and Wilfred Madius Tangau, President of the United Progressive Kinabalu Organisation (UPKO) signed a Memorandum of Understanding (MoU) on bipartisan cooperation and political transformation in parliament in efforts to realise political ceasefire.

==== Twelfth Malaysia Plan ====
On 27 September 2021, Ismail tabled the 12th Malaysian Plan (12MP) in Dewan Rakyat, Parliament and expected the financial position of Malaysia to improve in 2023. 12MP focuses on four human capital development areas in education sector, set aside RM 400 billion for ongoing and new projects, become carbon-neutral by 2050 to attract foreign investment, tackle climate change issues, 5G being deployed by the end of 2021, community Internet centres to be upgraded, its Public Service Law also meets calls for efficient and transparent government, its Governance Index to boost performance, integrity and compliance with global anti-graft standards, aims at Malaysia being transformed into a high-income nation by 2025 and where the average income of every families reaches RM 10000 and ensures 51% Bumiputra equity in local freight forwarding companies.

==== 2021–2022 floods ====
In December 2021, Ismail Sabri and his government faced criticism by the opposition coalition, Pakatan Harapan, for the response to major floods that affected many states in Peninsular Malaysia. Described as among the worst in the country's history and displacing over 60,000 people, the federal government's response was criticized by the opposition coalition, Pakatan Harapan, for its slowness; Ismail Sabri admitted there had been weaknesses in the response. On 24 December 2021, he instructed all his Cabinet ministers who were abroad to return to Malaysia immediately and those who were on leave and planning to go on holiday to cancel their plans till the flood disaster is resolved. On 20 January 2022, during the Special Meeting to discuss flood issues in Parliament, he claimed that he was on the ground at the first day of the flood and lots of opposition MPs are not there.

==== Littoral Combat Ship (LCS) Scandal ====
On 10 August 2022 in the midst LCS scandal, Ismail Sabri said that the government will declassify the Littoral Combat Ship (LCS) documents.

[...] "The cabinet has agreed to urge the MACC to speed up the probe and if strong evidence is obtained, the attorney-general should proceed to charge the individuals responsible in court.Nevertheless, the decisions made by the cabinet today will not affect the mobilisation process under the LCS Recovery Plan that was agreed on April 20. The government is committed to continuing this project due to its importance to the country's defence and to cater for the needs of our naval forces.On behalf of the government, I give assurance that the investigation into this matter will be carried out transparently and that the government will not protect anyone involved,"

— Ismail Sabri Yaakob

==== Bahasa Malaysia ====
Ismail Sabri highly emphasised the use of Bahasa Malaysia (Malaysian language) among Malaysians. He also proposed the language to be designated as the second official language of the Association of Southeast Asian Nations (ASEAN) besides English. He added that "we do not need to feel ashamed or awkward to use Bahasa Malaysia at the international level because this effort to uphold the language is also in line with one of the priority areas". On 7 September 2022, he praised and wished the newly elected Malaysian-born Member of Parliament (MP) for Tangney of Australia Sam Lim the best for speaking the language during his inaugural speech in the Parliament of Australia. He also expressed his proudness of seeing the language being heard in the chamber and the language being elevated in the world stage. On 24 September 2022, he created history as the first Malaysian prime minister to deliver a speech using the language in the United Nations General Assembly (UNGA).

=== International affairs ===
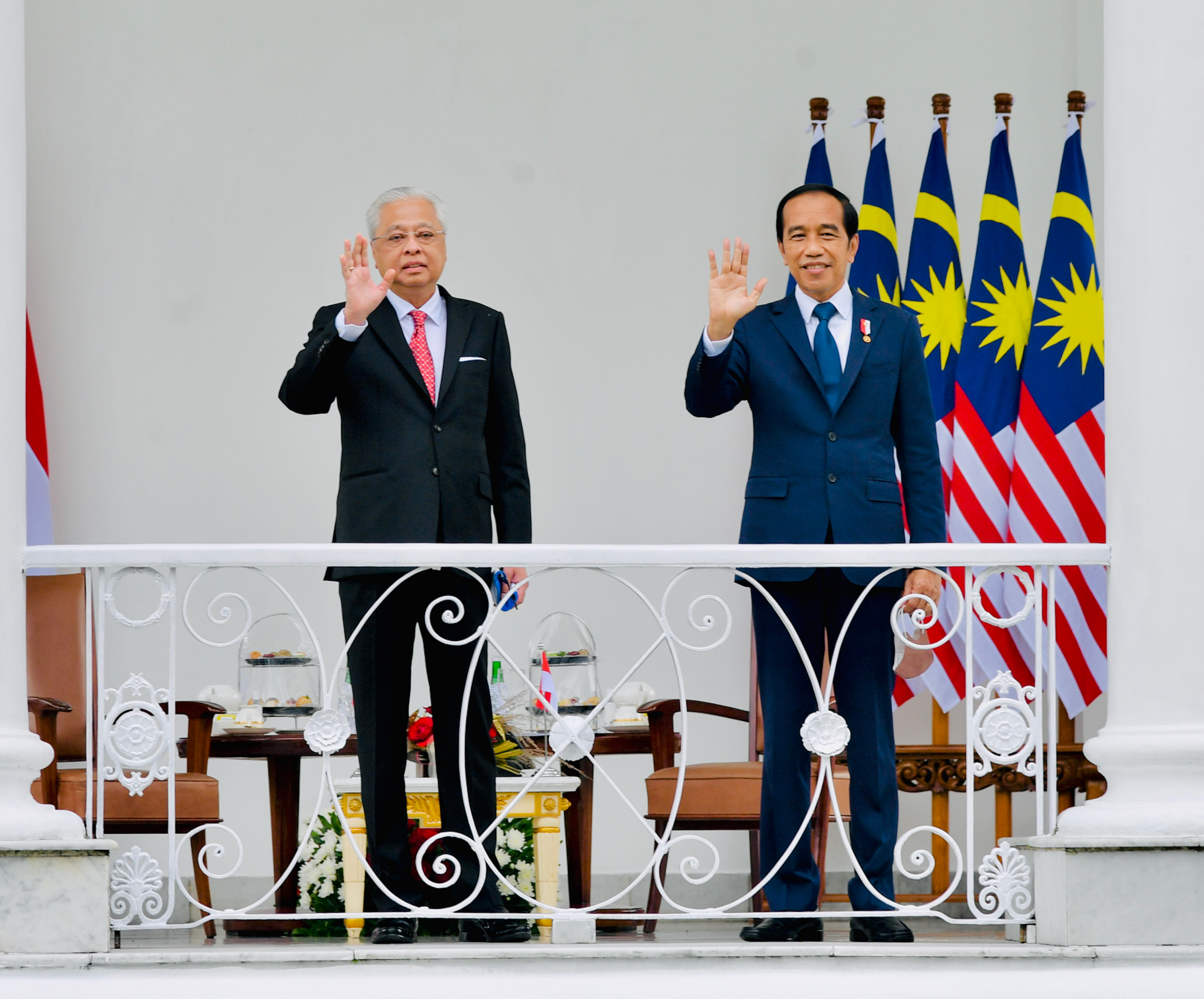
Indonesian President Joko Widodo with Ismail Sabri at Bogor Palace during his inaugural visit to Indonesia.

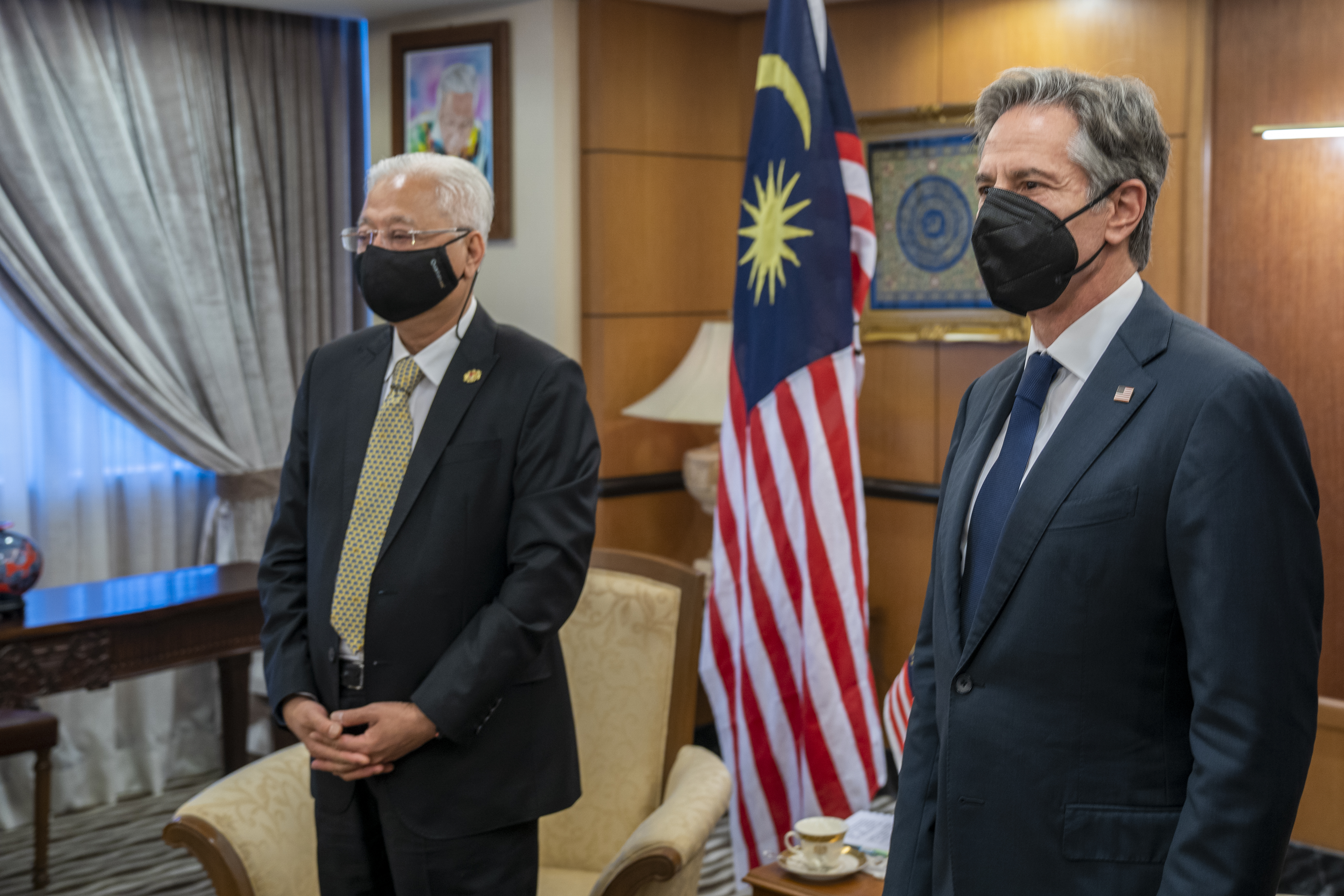
Ismail Sabri with US Secretary State Antony Blinken while receiving his honorary visit at the Parliament.

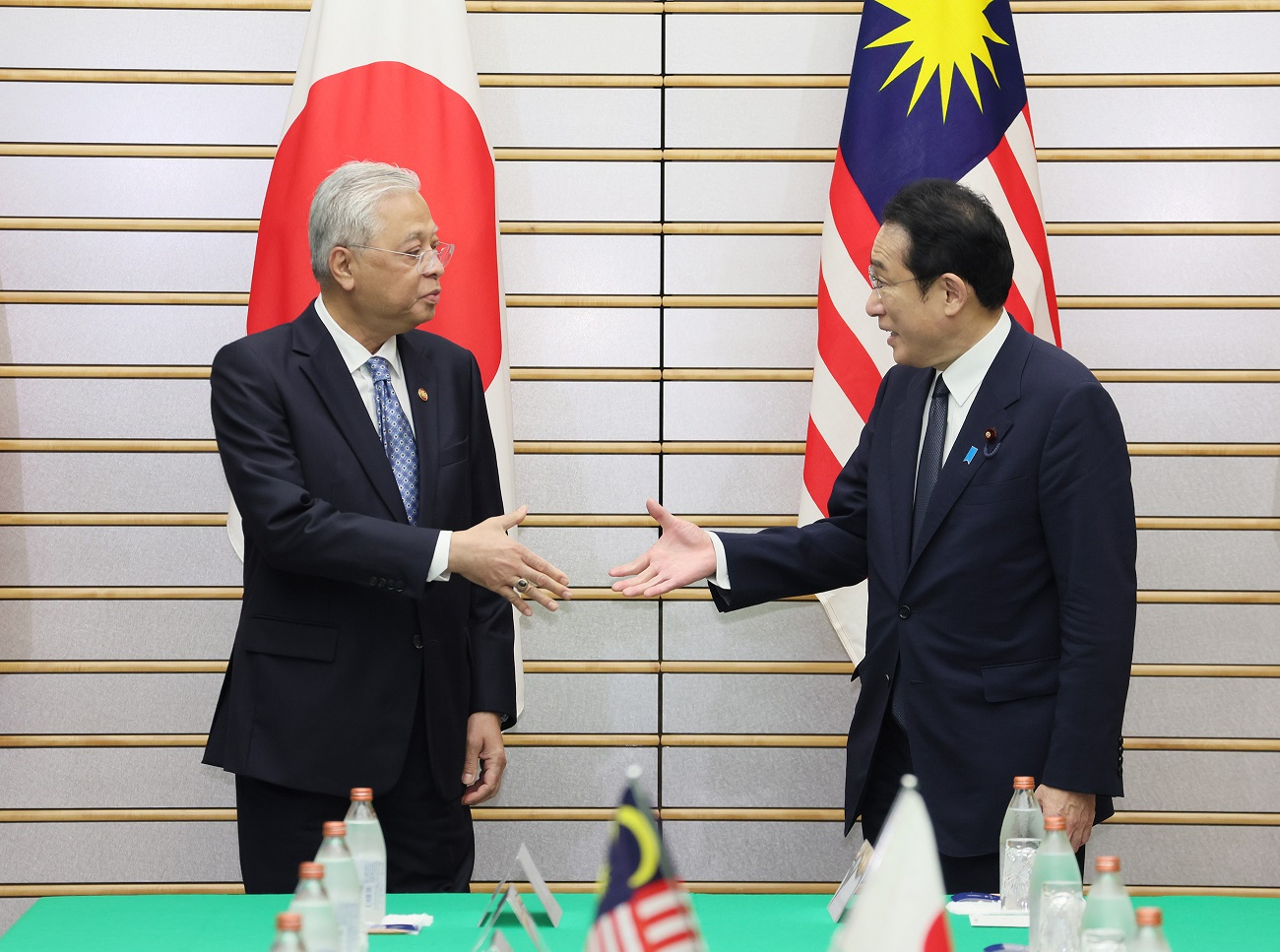
Ismail Sabri with Japanese Prime Minister Fumio Kishida

On 21 August 2021, Prime Minister of Singapore Lee Hsien Loong invited Ismail Sabri to Singapore for official visit during his congratulatory call to Ismail Sabri and they hoped to strengthen bilateral relations.

Ismail Sabri raised concerns over the AUKUS security pact with Australian Prime Minister Scott Morrison. Malaysia announced it would hold consultations with Chinese officials to clarify their views on the deal.

Ismail Sabri discussed mutual recognition of COVID-19 vaccine certificates between Malaysia and Indonesia to ease travel between the two countries.

On 15 October 2021, Ismail revealed that Malaysia had won a seat with 183 votes in the United Nations Human Rights Council for a term from 2022 to 2024.

Ismail Sabri did not attend the 2021 United Nations Climate Change Conference, but gave a mandate for Malaysia's delegation to table a new national carbon neutral commitment at the summit.

On 14 February 2022, Ismail arrived in Brunei, and met with the Sultan of Brunei Hassanal Bolkiah to discuss Myanmar, infrastructure and the South China Sea dispute.

=== COVID-19 pandemic ===
On 10 October 2021 during a special press conference, Ismail announced that restrictions on interstate travel and international travel would be lifted from the next day on 11 October 2021.

On 22 October 2021, after chairing meeting of the COVID-19 Pandemic Management Special Committee, he said international tourists would be allowed to visit Langkawi under an international tourism travel bubble pilot project with effect on 15 November 2021, the pilot project will be on for three months for the Ministry of Health and National Security Council to evaluate its effectiveness before the initiative is expanded to other islands and tourism destinations. In addition, a standard operating procedure (SOP) has been approved for the entry of foreign workers into the nation to meet the workforce demand by the plantation sector and said the same SOP would later be enforced on all sectors and approval to bring in workers from abroad will be on a case-by-case basis. Furthermore, he said complete vaccination for adolescents between 12 and 17 would be a condition stated in all SOPs and all conveniences enjoyed by fully vaccinated adults should be extended to teenagers who have been fully vaccinated.

On 8 March 2022, he unveiled that Malaysia will transition into the endemic phase of COVID-19 and reopen its borders to international tourists on 1 April 2022. He further commented that the operating hours for businesses would no longer be limited but the wearing of face masks would carry on to be mandatory and that fully vaccinated visitors and Malaysian returnees would no longer be ordered to undergo quarantine upon arrivals in Malaysia.

=== 2022 Malaysian general election ===
In April 2022, UMNO announced Ismail Sabri as its candidate for prime minister in the 15th Malaysian general election, due to be held by 19 November 2022.

On 10 October 2022 during a special televised address to the nation, he announced the dissolution of the 14th Parliament effective immediately after having an audience with and getting consent from the Yang di-Pertuan Agong Abdullah a day prior on 9 October 2022, paving the way for the 15th general election to be held within 60 days, by 19 November 2022.

BN suffered from a huge defeat in the elections. The coalition gave its worst ever electoral performance by winning only 30 seats and lost many of its seats including strongholds to PN. The coalition finished third after PH with 81 seats and PN with 73 seats (it later won 1 more seat and with 74 seats). Despite that, he as a BN candidate was reelected as the Bera MP for the fifth term.

After the elections, BN formed a coalition government with PH and several other political coalitions and parties. However, Ismail Sabri was not renominated as prime minister to lead the new government due to its significantly lower number of seats compared to PH, which won the most seats in the elections and held the most seats among them in the coalition government. On 24 November 2022, Chairman of PH Anwar Ibrahim was appointed to succeed Ismail Sabri as the 10th prime minister.

== Post-premiership (2022–present) ==
After leaving office as prime minister, Ismail Sabri was not appointed to any other government positions. However, as a BN MP, he became a government backbencher MP and remained supporting the coalition government of his successor Anwar. Despite that, he has widely been viewed and perceived as pro-Opposition and pro-PN. The view and perception were supported and proved by his absence in the Anwar government national convention on 14 May 2023 and his lack of confidence in the survival of the Anwar government. He warned that cracks are existing between the partnerships and relations of various political parties and coalitions that are in the government. He described the partnerships and relations as "forced marriages" and added that they would not work well and eventually lead to permanent break up and split.

On 5 February 2023, Ismail Sabri raised the possibility of leaving politics after completing his fifth term as an MP. However later that month, Ismail Sabri stated that he had no clear plans to quit politics yet, and will observe for the next 5 years before making a decision, possibly retiring from politics to make way for new and younger candidates.

On 15 February 2024, Ismail Sabri continued his studies to the level of Doctor of Philosophy (PhD) at Universiti Utara Malaysia (UUM). In the announcement made on social media, he who shared the student card obtained did not inform the specialization taken. He also expressed that he did not think that he would still be able to continue his studies even though he is 64 years old. "Alhamdulillah, today I got a student card. Officially today I became a student. I didn't expect even elders could being a students. This is called lifelong learning," he said. On 13 August at the same year, he successfully defended his thesis proposal, titled "Policy Models for Addressing Pandemic Health Security Threats: A Study of Covid-19 Cases in Malaysia (2020-2022)", supervised by Professor Dr. Rusdi Omar, Associate Professor Ts. Dr. Jessica Ong Hai Liaw dan Associate Professor Dr. Che Mohd Aziz Yaacob.

On 23 April 2024, Ismail Sabri confirmed that he would campaign in the Kuala Kubu Baharu by-election but stopped short of revealing any details of his campaign before receiving any orders from the UMNO party headquarters.

On 27 August 2026, Ismail Sabri was charged with failure to provide a complete declaration of his assets.

== Racial and political views ==
=== Call to boycott Chinese businesses ===
Ismail Sabri caused controversy in February 2015 with a Facebook comment urging Malay consumers to use their "power" to force the Chinese minority to cut prices by boycotting the Chinese businesses.

[...] Consumers hold the most power. Malay people make up the vast majority of consumers. The Chinese constitute a minority. If Malays boycott their businesses, they will be forced to lower their prices. Consider this: many Chinese eateries do not have a halal logo and have been raided and arrested several times for questionable halal status, [but] Malays continue to flock to the restaurant despite the fact that there are thousands of legitimate halal Malay restaurants. See OldTown White Coffee, [their halal status] has recently been called into question, but Malays continue to refuse to boycott them. Furthermore, the owner is said to be from the Ngeh family [and a member of] DAP Perak, which is known for its anti-Islam stance. If the Malays do not change their ways, the Chinese will seize the opportunity to suppress the Malay.

— Ismail Sabri Yaakob, 2 February 2015

Political analyst Wan Saiful Wan Jan said that any Malaysian voter regardless of race would be repelled by Ismail's comments. MCA's Wee Ka Siong slammed the statement, saying, "As a minister in the Cabinet, he should not make such ethnic generalisations. It is not as if only Chinese are businessmen". Inspector-General of Police (IGP) Khalid Abu Bakar stated that the minister would be investigated under the Sedition Act 1948 and Ismail Sabri has since deleted the Facebook comment.

In October 2018, Ismail agreed to pay DAP's Ngeh Koo Ham RM80,000 in damages and RM5,000 in legal fees after being found guilty of defamation. Ngeh's office clarified that Ngeh has no share or interest in OldTown White Coffee, and that the anti-Islam allegation is "false" and "absurd".

=== Low Yat 2 ===
In 2015, Ismail Sabri proposed establishing "Low Yat 2", a digital gadget mall that would only house Malay traders. He claims that "Low Yat 2" will be able to compete with Plaza Low Yat, Malaysia's most well-known electronic products store. Although the traders are all Malay, Ismail calls on the minorities to support the mall.

MCA then-president Liow Tiong Lai said that the setting up of Low Yat 2 would only hurt racial relations, and described the proposal for the bumiputra-only mall as an "antagonistic approach". Fellow UMNO member Saifuddin Abdullah also criticised the proposal, claiming that Ismail Sabri's proposal would be detrimental to Malays and Malaysians in general, and that having commercial sectors divided by ethnicity would be counterproductive.

=== Taylor's University sponsorship cancellation ===
Taylor's University terminated the services of a bus operator who utilised their vehicles with the university's logo to transport passengers to the racially motivated 2015 Malay Dignity rally. According to Ismail Sabri, the sponsorship for the next intake of students to Taylor's University will be terminated by MARA. However, he did not specify the reasons for the revocation. When questioned if this was due to the cancellation of the service, he answered, "There are many reasons". Ismail stated that he will notify Mara's director-general to evaluate its funding of Taylor's University.

DAP's Teresa Kok criticised the decision, calling it a "personal vendetta and abuse of power", and called for the cabinet to censure Ismail Sabri, as well as challenging him to publicly reveal the reasons for the decision, as well as publish the internal report which led to the decision. MCA's Chai Kim Sen said the minister's inability to state even one reason for this decision was not only “unbecoming” but “even childish”. He said his latest announcement about MARA would only “further weaken his already-tarred reputation as a racist”. He further added that the education institutes are expected to remain apolitical.

=== Comments ahead of the 2018 election ===
Ismail Sabri sparked another controversy ahead of the 2018 Malaysian general election, when he stated that every vote for the DAP is a vote for the Pakatan Harapan to eliminate the purported Malay "special rights" and "uniqueness" of Islam. Lim Kit Siang responded that Ismail Sabri appeared to be attempting to frame the upcoming general election as a battle between Malays and Chinese, as well as between Islam and its "enemies". Lim also explained that Pakatan Harapan's basic documents, including its election manifesto, had been clear and specific in giving unconditional support to Article 153 on Malay special rights and Article 3 on Islam as the official religion of the Federation. He also stated that although the Democratic Action Party or other races party managed to form a new government in the country if winning the election, the Malays will never perish since the overwhelming majority of Malaysian voters are still Malays and the overwhelming majority of parliamentary and state assembly constituencies in the country are Malay voter-majority constituencies.

=== Promoting the Malaysian language ===
In early 2022, Ismail Sabri suggested that the Malaysia language should be more widely used, especially by ASEAN in official capacities. In response, Nadiem Makarim, minister of education, culture, research, and technology of Indonesia, expressed that the Indonesian language should sit in the lead. In Malaysia, both languages are commonly viewed as the same, whereas Indonesia views its language as a more distinct branch.

=== Israel–Palestine issue ===
Ismail Sabri has called Organisation of Islamic Cooperation, Arab League, United Nations and the entire Muslim communities to halt "atrocities committed by Zionist regime". He said the right of the Palestinians to form a sovereign and independent state must be upheld. He added that the latest conflict between Palestine and Israel stems from a very long history and that the Palestinians had been locked up in the world's largest open-air prison for decades. He called for "the entire Malaysian Family to stand in solidarity and pray that the land of Palestine continues to be protected and blessed by Allah".

== Controversies and issues ==
=== Allegation of corruption ===
Sabri has been named a suspect in a corruption probe involving RM700 million (US$157 million) in government funds during his premiership from August 2021 to November 2022.

=== Alleged sea turtle egg consumption ===
On 4 November 2015, a photo of Ismail Sabri having dinner at a seafood restaurant in Sandakan with Beluran Umno chief Datuk James Ratib went viral. A plate of a dozen sea turtle eggs on the dinner table was seen in the photo. On 19 November 2015, other photos surfaced and went viral on Facebook showing fragments of turtle eggshells on the table in front of some of the diners. Possession of sea turtles and their products is an offence under the Sabah Wildlife Conservation Enactment 1997. Ismail Sabri denied consuming the turtle eggs, citing health reasons and said he was not aware of laws prohibiting their consumption.

In March 2017, Ismail filed a RM10 million suit in the Kuala Lumpur High Court, alleging that Sabah Publishing and James Sarda had wrongfully and maliciously published three articles in the Sabah-based Daily Express over the matter. The suit was settled out of court without a trial in September 2018 after the plaintiff and defendant reached an amicable agreement.

=== Support of the vaping industry ===
On 9 November 2015, Ismail Sabri stated that he supports the vaping industry in Malaysia. He says that the Malay-dominated industry is a success story for bumiputera entrepreneurism despite health warnings by the Malaysian Health Ministry. He has gone further in hoping that the unregulated industry can expand globally. Many prominent doctors and physicians have publicly chided Ismail Sabri's support for the industry, including the Sultan of Johor Ibrahim Ismail, who publicly decreed that all vape outlets must be shut down by 1 January 2016.

=== Nurul Izzah Anwar defamation suit ===
PKR's Nurul Izzah Anwar sued Ismail Sabri Yaakob and IGP Khalid Abu Bakar in November 2015 for allegedly accusing her of being a traitor to the country. She claimed that Ismail Sabri said words that implied she was a traitor to the country and had declared war on the Yang di-Pertuan Agong. She also claimed that Khalid said defamatory words about her in another press conference. Both incidents occur just a few days after photographs of her with Jacel Kiram, daughter of Jamalul Kiram III, who is said to have ordered or led the 2013 invasion of Sabah surfaced. In April 2018, the High Court ordered Ismail and Khalid to pay Nurul RM600,000 and RM400,000 in damages, respectively, after ruling that their statements had defamed Nurul in their natural and ordinary meaning.

=== Petition against his appointment as prime minister ===
Hours after Ismail Sabri was announced and nominated by his party as the 9th Prime Minister of Malaysia on 19 August 2021, an online petition was launched to address to the Yang di-Pertuan Agong as well as the Istana Negara, calling on all Malaysians against his possible appointment as the nation's next prime minister after the collapse of the Perikatan Nasional administration on 16 August 2021. The petition on change.org gained over 200,000 signatures within 8 hours of going online, later increasing to over 350,000 signatures. The petition was critical of Ismail Sabri's handling of the COVID-19 pandemic in his prior positions leading to large-scale infections, and for previous comments on race and Malay "special rights". According to the petition, he had also issued numerous remarks which were deemed inappropriate such as the boycott call in 2015, where he urged Malay consumers to use their "power and rights" to pressure the Malaysian Chinese minority to lower prices, as well as promoting racial segregation between the Malays and Chinese in the country. Ismail has been also criticised in the petition for the sometimes confusing and conflicting health protocols, namely Standard Operating Procedures (SOP), including on which economic sectors should stay shut as COVID-19 cases kept rising.

=== Implementation of bumiputera policies ===
A new equity policy for bumiputeras in the Twelfth Malaysia Plan (12MP) attracted controversy were announced by Ismail. It is said to ensure sustainable equity holdings by bumiputeras, an equity safety net would be launched to guarantee that the sale of shares or bumiputera-owned firms would only be sold solely to bumiputera-owned companies, consortium or individuals. Syed Saddiq said that the new rulings were unfair as they would be tantamount to taking equity from the non-bumiputeras and giving them to bumiputeras. Former Health Minister, Dzulkefly Ahmad had also described the policy as "suicidal" and claimed that the new policy would only kill the bumiputera companies economically if that is their intention. He also said that based on the feedback from Malay businessmen, most were against the idea of the new bumiputera-only policy being implemented. Ismail Sabri announced it after revealing that the government’s target to raise bumiputera equity ownership to 30% had yet to be achieved. He also announced funding to improve bumiputera businesses’ sustainability to hit 15% contribution in gross domestic product (GDP) by bumiputera micro, small and medium enterprises by 2025.

== Personal life ==
=== Family ===
Ismail Sabri married Muhaini Zainal Abidin in 1986. He is the father of one daughter and three sons: Nina Sabrina, Gaddafi, Iqbal and Nashriq. His son Gadaffi Ismail Sabri or more popularly known as Dafi is a former participant-student of entertainment reality show Akademi Fantasia Season 5 turned singer and actor. His only daughter, Nina Sabrina, was married to fashion designer Jovian Mandagie, but divorced in August 2023.

=== Health ===
On 22 February 2025, Ismail Sabri was hospitalised after being found unconscious at his home due to high blood pressure.

== Election results ==
Parliament of Malaysia
Year	Constituency	Candidate	Votes	Pct	Opponent(s)	Votes	Pct	Ballots cast	Majority	Turnout
2004	P090 Bera	Ismail Sabri Yaakob (UMNO)	16,714	53.75%	Abd Wahab Ismail (PAS)	12,244	39.37%	31,096	4,982	76.53%
2008	P090 Bera	Ismail Sabri Yaakob (UMNO)	18,051	54.50%	Mazlan Aliman (PAS)	14,230	42.96%	33,123	4,313	77.04%
2013	P090 Bera	Ismail Sabri Yaakob (UMNO)	21,669	50.46%	Zakaria Abdul Hamid (PKR)	19,526	45.47%	42,944	2,143	84.21%
2013	P090 Bera	Ismail Sabri Yaakob (UMNO)	21,669	50.46%	Mohd Wali Ahmad (IND)	670	1.56%	42,944	2,143	84.21%
2018	P090 Bera	Ismail Sabri Yaakob (UMNO)	20,760	43.89%	Zakaria Abdul Hamid (PKR)	18,449	39.00%	48,339	2,311	82.33%
2018	P090 Bera	Ismail Sabri Yaakob (UMNO)	20,760	43.89%	Musaniff Ab Rahman (PAS)	8,096	17.11%	48,339	2,311	82.33%
2022	P090 Bera	Ismail Sabri Yaakob (UMNO)	31,762	53.34%	Abas Awang (PKR)	15,067	25.30%	59,548	16,695	76.67%
2022	P090 Bera	Ismail Sabri Yaakob (UMNO)	31,762	53.34%	Asmawi Harun (BERSATU)	12,719	21.36%	59,548	16,695	76.67%

== Honours ==
=== Honours of Malaysia ===
- Malaysia
  - Recipient of the 16th Yang di-Pertuan Agong Installation Medal (2019)
  - Recipient of the 17th Yang di-Pertuan Agong Installation Medal (2024)
- Malacca
  - Knight Grand Commander of the Premier and Exalted Order of Malacca (DUNM) – Datuk Seri Utama (2022)
  - Grand Commander of the Exalted Order of Malacca (DGSM) – Datuk Seri (2020)
  - Companion Class I of the Exalted Order of Malacca (DMSM) – Datuk (2004)
- Pahang
  - Knight Grand Companion of the Order of Sultan Ahmad Shah of Pahang (SSAP) – Dato' Sri (2008)
  - Knight Companion of the Order of the Crown of Pahang (DIMP) – Dato' (2005)
- Sabah
  - Grand Commander of the Order of Kinabalu (SPDK) – Datuk Seri Panglima (2020)
  - Member of the Order of Kinabalu (ADK) (2001)
- Sarawak
  - Knight Grand Commander of the Order of the Star of Hornbill Sarawak (DP) – Datuk Patinggi (2022)

=== Honorary degrees ===
- Japan
  - Honorary Ph.D. degree in Medicine from Nihon University (2022)

== See also ==
- 2020–2021 Malaysian political crisis
- Bera (federal constituency)
- Impact of the COVID-19 pandemic on politics in Malaysia

Parliament of Malaysia
New constituency	Member of Parliament for Bera; 2004–present	Incumbent
Political offices
Preceded by Azalina Othman Said	Minister of Youth and Sports; 2008–2009	Succeeded by Ahmad Shabery Cheek
Preceded by Shahrir Abdul Samad	Minister of Domestic Trade, Co-operatives and Consumerism; 2009–2013	Succeeded by Hasan Malek
Preceded by Noh Omar	Minister of Agriculture and Agro-based Industry; 2013–2015	Succeeded by Ahmad Shabery Cheek
Preceded by Shafie Apdal	Minister of Rural and Regional Development; 2015–2018	Succeeded by Rina Harun
Preceded by Ahmad Zahid Hamidi	Leader of the Opposition; 2019–2020	Succeeded by Anwar Ibrahim
New office	Senior Minister (Security and Unity); 2020–2021	Succeeded by Hishamuddin Hussein
Preceded by Mohamad Sabu	Minister of Defence; 2020–2021	Succeeded by Hishamuddin Hussein
Preceded by Wan Azizah Wan Ismail	Deputy Prime Minister of Malaysia; 2021; 7 July – 16 August	Succeeded by Ahmad Zahid Hamidi; Fadillah Yusof
Preceded by Muhyiddin Yassin	Prime Minister of Malaysia; 2021–2022	Succeeded by Anwar Ibrahim
Party political offices
Preceded by Ahmad Zahid Hamidi	Vice President of the United Malays National Organization; Serving with: Mahdzir Khalid, Mohamed Khaled Nordin; 2018–2023	Succeeded by Wan Rosdy Wan Ismail
