= Twelfth Malaysia Plan =

The Twelfth Malaysia Plan (Malay: Rancangan Malaysia Kedua Belas), otherwise known as the 12th Malaysia Plan and abbreviated as "12MP", is a comprehensive blueprint prepared by the Economic Planning Unit (EPU) of the Prime Minister's Department (PMO) and the Ministry of Finance. The blueprint is a continuation to the 11th Malaysia Plan with a clear strategic direction to allocate the national budget from 2021 to 2025 in regard to all economic sectors in Malaysia. The blueprint was tabled by Prime Minister Ismail Sabri Yaakob in Dewan Rakyat, Parliament on 27 September 2021.

== Overview ==
The 12MP will highlight strategic basics in line with the shared prosperity initiative encompassing three dimensions which are:

1. Economic empowerment
2. Environmental sustainability
3. Social reengineering

== Reception ==
A new equity policy for bumiputeras in the 12MP to ensure sustainable equity holdings by bumiputeras as an equity safety net would be launched to guarantee that the sale of shares or bumiputera-owned firms would only be sold solely to bumiputera-owned companies, consortium or individuals. Syed Saddiq said that the new rulings were unfair as they would be tantamount to taking equity from the non-bumiputeras and giving them to bumiputeras. Former Health Minister, Dzulkefly Ahmad had also described the policy as "suicidal" and claimed that the new policy would only kill the bumiputera companies economically if that is their intention. He also said that based on the feedback from Malay businessmen, most were against the idea of the new bumiputera-only policy being implemented. Ismail Sabri announced it after revealing that the government’s target to raise bumiputera equity ownership to 30% had yet to be achieved. He also announced funding to improve bumiputera businesses’ sustainability to hit 15% contribution in gross domestic product (GDP) by bumiputera micro, small and medium enterprises by 2025.
