= Minister of Defence (Malaysia) =

Administers a portfolio through the Minister of Defence Department

- Menteri Pertahanan

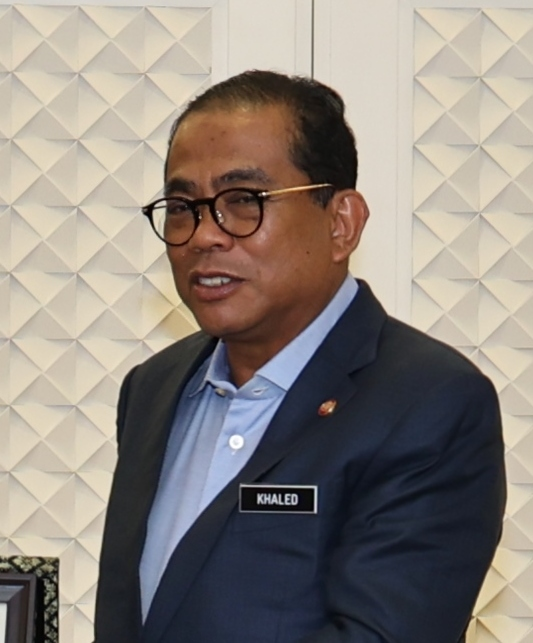
- Incumbent; Mohamed Khaled Nordin since 12 December 2023
- Ministry of Defence
- Style: Yang Berhormat Menteri (The Honourable Minister)
- Abbreviation: KEMENTAH/MINDEF/MOD
- Member of: Cabinet of Malaysia
- Reports to: Parliament of Malaysia
- Seat: Kuala Lumpur
- Appointer: Yang di-Pertuan Agong on the recommendation of the Prime Minister of Malaysia
- Formation: 31 August 1957
- First holder: Abdul Razak Hussein
- Deputy: Adly Zahari
- Website: www.mod.gov.my

The current Malaysian Minister of Defence is Mohamed Khaled Nordin since 12 December 2023. The minister is supported by Deputy Minister of Defence which is Adly Zahari. The Minister administers the portfolio through the Ministry of Defence.

== List of ministers of defence ==
The following individuals have been appointed as Minister of Defence, or any of its precedent titles:

Political party: Alliance/BN PH

Portrait	Name (Birth–Death) Constituency	Political party	Title	Took office	Left office	Deputy Minister	Prime Minister (Cabinet)
	Abdul Razak Hussein (1922–1976) (Deputy Prime Minister); MP for Pekan	Alliance (UMNO)	Minister of Defence	31 August 1957	22 September 1970	Vacant	Tunku Abdul Rahman (I • II • III • IV)
	Hamzah Abu Samah (1924–2012); MP for Raub	Alliance (UMNO)	Minister of Defence	13 August 1973	14 September 1974	Vacant	Abdul Razak Hussein (I)
	Mustapha Harun (1918–1995); MP for Marudu	BN (USNO)	Minister of Defence	15 September 1974	1974	Dzulkifli Abdul Hamid	Abdul Razak Hussein (II)
	Abdul Razak Hussein (1922–1976) (Prime Minister); MP for Pekan	BN (UMNO)	Minister of Defence	1974	1976	Mokhtar Hashim	Abdul Razak Hussein (II)
	Hussein Onn (1922–1990); MP for Sri Gading	BN (UMNO)	Minister of Defence	1976	1978	Mokhtar Hashim	Hussein Onn (I)
	Abdul Taib Mahmud (1936–2024); MP for Samarahan	BN (PBB)	Minister of Defence	1978	1979	Mokhtar Hashim	Hussein Onn (II)
	Hussein Onn (1922–1990) (Prime Minister); MP for Sri Gading	BN (UMNO)	Minister of Defence	1979	16 July 1981	Abu Hassan Omar	Hussein Onn (II)
	Mahathir Mohamad (b. 1925) (Prime Minister); MP for Kubang Pasu	BN (UMNO)	Minister of Defence	17 July 1981	6 May 1986	Abang Abu Bakar	Mahathir Mohamad (I • II)
	Abdullah Ahmad Badawi (1939–2025); MP for Kepala Batas	BN (UMNO)	Minister of Defence	11 August 1986	7 May 1987	Abang Abu Bakar	Mahathir Mohamad (III)
	Tengku Ahmad Rithauddeen Ismail (1932–2022); MP for Kota Bharu	BN (UMNO)	Minister of Defence	20 May 1987	26 October 1990	Abang Abu Bakar	Mahathir Mohamad (III)
	Najib Razak (b. 1953); MP for Pekan	BN (UMNO)	Minister of Defence	27 October 1990	7 May 1995	Wan Abu Bakar Wan Mohamed	Mahathir Mohamad (IV)
	Syed Hamid Albar (b. 1944); MP for Kota Tinggi	BN (UMNO)	Minister of Defence	8 May 1995	14 December 1999	Abdullah Fadzil Che Wan	Mahathir Mohamad (V)
	Najib Razak (b. 1953) (Deputy Prime Minister); MP for Pekan	BN (UMNO)	Minister of Defence	15 December 1999	18 March 2008	Shafie Apdal (1999–2004); Zainal Abidin Zin (2004–2008)	Mahathir Mohamad (VI); Abdullah Ahmad Badawi (I • II)
	Abdullah Ahmad Badawi (1939–2025) (Prime Minister); MP for Kepala Batas	BN (UMNO)	Minister of Defence	19 March 2008	9 April 2009	Abu Seman Yusop	Abdullah Ahmad Badawi (III)
	Ahmad Zahid Hamidi (b. 1953); MP for Bagan Datok	BN (UMNO)	Minister of Defence	10 April 2009	15 May 2013	Abdul Latiff Ahmad	Najib Razak (I)
	Hishammuddin Hussein (b.1961); MP for Sembrong	BN (UMNO)	Minister of Defence	16 May 2013	9 May 2018	Abdul Rahim Bakri (2013–2015); Mohd Johari Baharum (2015–2018)	Najib Razak (II)
	Mohamad Sabu (b.1954); MP for Kota Raja	PH (AMANAH)	Minister of Defence	21 May 2018	24 February 2020	Liew Chin Tong	Mahathir Mohamad (VII)
	Ismail Sabri Yaakob (b. 1960) (Senior Minister) (Deputy Prime Minister); MP for Bera	BN (UMNO)	Senior Minister of Defence	10 March 2020	7 July 2021	Ikmal Hisham Abdul Aziz	Muhyiddin Yassin (I)
	Ismail Sabri Yaakob (b. 1960) (Senior Minister) (Deputy Prime Minister); MP for Bera	BN (UMNO)	Minister of Defence	7 July 2021	16 August 2021	Ikmal Hisham Abdul Aziz	Muhyiddin Yassin (I)
	Hishammuddin Hussein (b. 1961) (Senior Minister); MP for Sembrong	BN (UMNO)	Senior Minister of Defence	30 August 2021	24 November 2022	Ikmal Hisham Abdul Aziz	Ismail Sabri Yaakob (I)
	Mohamad Hasan (b. 1956); MP for Rembau	BN (UMNO)	Minister of Defence	3 December 2022	12 December 2023	Adly Zahari	Anwar Ibrahim (I)
	Mohamed Khaled Nordin (b. 1958); MP for Kota Tinggi	BN (UMNO)	Minister of Defence	12 December 2023	Incumbent	Adly Zahari	Anwar Ibrahim (I)
