= Sembrong =

Federal constituency in Johor, Malaysia

Sembrong (P153)
Johor constituency

Federal constituency
- Legislature: Dewan Rakyat
- MP: Hishamuddin Hussein; BN
- Constituency created: 2003
- First contested: 2004
- Last contested: 2022

Demographics
- Population (2020): 63,621
- Electors (2026): 55,233
- Area (km²): 1,865
- Pop. density (per km²): 34.1

Sembrong is a federal constituency in Kluang District, Johor, Malaysia, that has been represented in the Dewan Rakyat since 2004.

The federal constituency was created from parts of the Kluang constituency in the 2003 redistribution and is mandated to return a single member to the Dewan Rakyat under the first past the post voting system.

== Demographics ==
Ethnic breakdown of Sembrong's electorate as of 2022
1. Malay (62.3%)
2. Chinese (28.0%)
3. Indian (8.50%)
4. Other ethnicities (1.10%)

As of 2020, Sembrong has a population of 63,621 people.

Age breakdown of Sembrong's electorate as of 2022
1. 18-20 (4.89%)
2. 21-29 (18.7%)
3. 30-39 (24.9%)
4. 40-49 (17.4%)
5. 50-59 (12.9%)
6. 60-69 (13.1%)
7. 70-79 (6.13%)
8. 80-89 (1.67%)
9. above 90 (0.35%)
Gender breakdown of Sembrong's electorate as of 2022
1. Male (50.2%)
2. Female (49.8%)

== History ==
=== Polling districts ===
According to the gazette issued on 2 July 2026, the Sembrong constituency has a total of 29 polling districts.

State constituency	Polling districts	Code	Location
Paloh（N30）	Klebang	153/30/01	Dewan Orang Ramai Ladang Kempas Klebang
Paloh（N30）	Kampong Melayu Paloh	153/30/02	SK Bukit Paloh
Paloh（N30）	Ladang Paloh	153/30/03	Balai Raya Ladang Paloh
Paloh（N30）	Paloh	153/30/04	SMK Paloh
Paloh（N30）	Bandar Paloh Utara	153/30/05	SJK (C) Paloh
Paloh（N30）	Bandar Paloh Selatan	153/30/06	SK Bandar Paloh
Paloh（N30）	Kampong Muhibbah	153/30/07	SA Bandar Paloh
Paloh（N30）	Kali Malaya	153/30/08	SJK (C) Yu Ming
Paloh（N30）	Bukit Paloh	153/30/09	Dewan Orang Ramai Ladang Bukit Paloh
Paloh（N30）	Ladang Landak	153/30/10	Dewan Komuniti Ladang Landak
Paloh（N30）	Ladang Kekayaan	153/30/11	Balai Raya Ladang Kekayaan
Paloh（N30）	Chamek	152/30/12	Dewan Seberguna Chamek
Paloh（N30）	Consolidated Eastern Planations	153/30/13	SJK (C) Lit Terk
Paloh（N30）	Tereh Selatan	153/30/14	SK Ladang Tereh
Paloh（N30）	Pengkalan Tereh	150/30/15	SK Pengkalan Tereh
Paloh（N30）	Ladang Pamol	150/30/16	SK Ladang Pamol
Paloh（N30）	Pekan Kampong Gajah	153/30/17	SJK (C) Kampung Gajah
Paloh（N30）	Kampong Gajah	150/30/18	SJK (C) Kampong Gajah
Paloh（N30）	FELDA Kahang Barat	150/38/19	SK (FELDA) Kahang Barat
Kahang（N31）	Kangkar Kahang Timor	153/31/01	SJK (C) Kahang
Kahang（N31）	Kangkar Kahang Barat	153/30/02	SA Kampung Contoh
Kahang（N31）	Kahang	153/31/03	SK Kahang; SK Seri Sedohok
Kahang（N31）	FELDA Kahang Timor	153/31/04	SK (FELDA) Kahang Timur
Kahang（N31）	FELDA Ulu Dengar	153/31/05	SK LKTP Ulu Dengar
Kahang（N31）	Sri Lambak	153/31/06	SA Taman Sri Lambak; SK Bandar T6
Kahang（N31）	Sungai Sayong	154/31/07	SJK (C) Sayong
Kahang（N31）	FELDA Bukit Tongkat	153/31/08	SMK LKTP Belitong
Kahang（N31）	FELDA Ulu Belitong	153/31/09	SK LKTP Belitong
Kahang（N31）	FELDA Ulu Pengeli	153/31/10	SK (FELDA) Ulu Pengeli

=== Representation history ===
Members of Parliament for Sembrong
Parliament	No	Years	Member	Party	Vote Share
Constituency created from Kluang, Tenggara and Mersing
11th	P153	2004–2008	Hishammuddin Hussein (هشام الدين حسين)	BN (UMNO)	19,575; 88.29%
12th	P153	2008–2013	Hishammuddin Hussein (هشام الدين حسين)	BN (UMNO)	17,988; 73.70%
13th	P153	2013–2018	Hishammuddin Hussein (هشام الدين حسين)	BN (UMNO)	22,841; 65.17%
14th	P153	2018–2022	Hishammuddin Hussein (هشام الدين حسين)	BN (UMNO)	21,353; 59.24%
15th	P153	2022–present	Hishammuddin Hussein (هشام الدين حسين)	BN (UMNO)	22,572; 55.15%

=== State constituency ===
Parliamentary constituency	State constituency						
Parliamentary constituency	1954–59*	1959–1974	1974–1986	1986–1995	1995–2004	2004–2018	2018–present
Sembrong						Kahang	
Sembrong						Paloh	

=== Historical boundaries ===
State Constituency	Area	
State Constituency	2003	2018
Kahang	FELDA Ulu Dengar; Kampung Chontoh; Kampung Sri Lukut; Kahang; Taman Sri Lambak	FELDA Kahang Barat; FELDA Ulu Dengar; Kampung Sri Lukut; Kahang; Taman Sri Lambak
Paloh	Chamek; FELDA Kahang Barat; Kampung Melayu; Kampung Nyior; Paloh	Chamek; Kampung Gajah; Kampung Melayu; Kampung Nyior; Paloh

=== Current state assembly members ===
No.	State Constituency	Member	Coalition (Party)
N30	Paloh	Lee Ting Han	BN (MCA)
N31	Kahang	Rugendran Vellayan	BN (MIC)

=== Local governments & postcodes ===
No.	State Constituency	Local Government	Postcode
N30	Paloh	Kluang Municipal Council	85400 Chaah; 86000 Kluang; 86300 Renggam; 86600 Paloh
N31	Kahang	Kluang Municipal Council; Simpang Renggam District Council (Sri Lambak and Belitong areas)	85400 Chaah; 86000 Kluang; 86300 Renggam; 86600 Paloh

== Election results ==
Malaysian general election, 2022: Sembrong
Party	Candidate	Votes	%	∆%
BN	Hishamuddin Hussein	22,572	55.15	▼4.09
PH	Hasni Abas	11,692	28.57	▲28.57
PN	Aziz Ismail	6,666	16.29	▲16.29
Total valid votes		40,930	100.00	
Total rejected ballots		390		
Unreturned ballots		129		
Turnout		41,449	74.44	▼8.86
Registered electors		54,982		
Majority		10,880	26.58	▲8.10
BN hold		Swing		
Source(s) https://lom.agc.gov.my/ilims/upload/portal/akta/outputp/1753254/PUB%20617%20PARLIMEN%20JOHOR.pdf

Malaysian general election, 2018: Sembrong
Party	Candidate	Votes	%	∆%
BN	Hishammuddin Hussein	21,353	59.24	▼5.93
PKR	Onn Abu Bakar	14,691	40.76	▲5.93
Total valid votes		36,044	100.00	
Total rejected ballots		598		
Unreturned ballots		126		
Turnout		36,768	83.30	▼3.05
Registered electors		44,137		
Majority		6,662	18.48	▼11.86
BN hold		Swing		
Source(s) "His Majesty's Government Gazette - Notice of Contested Election, Parliament for the State of Johore [P.U. (B) 244/2018]" (PDF). Attorney General's Chambers of Malaysia. 3 May 2018. Archived from the original (PDF) on 29 December 2019. "Federal Government Gazette - Results of Contested Election and Statements of the Poll after the Official Addition of Votes, Parliamentary Constituencies for the State of Johore [P.U. (B) 318/2018]" (PDF). Attorney General's Chambers of Malaysia. 28 May 2018.

Malaysian general election, 2013: Sembrong
Party	Candidate	Votes	%	∆%
BN	Hishammuddin Hussein	22,841	65.17	▼8.53
PKR	Onn Abu Bakar	12,210	34.83	▲8.53
Total valid votes		35,051	100.00	
Total rejected ballots		809		
Unreturned ballots		50		
Turnout		35,910	86.35	▲10.37
Registered electors		41,588		
Majority		10,631	30.34	▼17.06
BN hold		Swing		
Source(s) "Federal Government Gazette - Notice of Contested Election, Parliament for the State of Johore [P.U. (B) 181/2013]" (PDF). Attorney General's Chambers of Malaysia. 26 April 2013. "Federal Government Gazette - Results of Contested Election and Statements of the Poll after the Official Addition of Votes, Parliamentary Constituencies for the State of Johore [P.U. (B) 222/2013]" (PDF). Attorney General's Chambers of Malaysia. 22 May 2013. "Federal Government Gazette - Results of Contested Election and Statements of the Poll after the Official Addition of Votes, Parliamentary Constituencies for the State of Johore Corrigendum [P.U. (B) 247/2013]" (PDF). Attorney General's Chambers of Malaysia. 31 May 2013. Archived from the original (PDF) on 29 December 2019.

Malaysian general election, 2008: Sembrong
Party	Candidate	Votes	%	∆%
BN	Hishammuddin Hussein	17,988	73.70	▼14.59
PKR	Lee Sang	6,418	26.30	▲14.59
Total valid votes		24,406	100.00	
Total rejected ballots		739		
Unreturned ballots		66		
Turnout		25,211	75.98	▼1.37
Registered electors		33,181		
Majority		11,570	47.40	▼29.18
BN hold		Swing		

Malaysian general election, 2004: Sembrong
Party	Candidate	Votes	%
BN	Hishammuddin Hussein	19,575	88.29
PAS	Onn Jaafar	2,597	11.71
Total valid votes		22,172	100.00
Total rejected ballots		760	
Unreturned ballots		24	
Turnout		22,956	74.61
Registered electors		30,767	
Majority		16,978	76.58
This was a new constituency created out of Kluang which went to BN in the previous election.
