= Ethnic Indians in the Cabinet of Malaysia =

Malaysian Indians have served in the Cabinet of Malaysia since independence and continue to do so.

Tun Samy Vellu is one of the longest serving ministers in the Cabinet of Malaysia. He held the post of Minister of Public Works and Utilities from 1979 to 2008. Following his departure from the cabinet, he was appointed Special Envoy of Infrastructure to India and South Asia.

Gobind Singh Deo is the first Malaysian Sikh cabinet minister.

== List of ministers ==
This is a complete list of ethnic Indians who have served as Ministers in the Cabinet of Malaysia, ordered by seniority. This list includes ethnic Indians who served in the past and who continue to serve in the present.

Party	Name	Cabinet	Portfolio	Year elected	Year left	Constituency
Alliance(MIC)	V. T. Sambanthan	First Rahman Cabinet	Minister of Labour	1955	1957	Kinta Utara
Alliance(MIC)	V. T. Sambanthan	First Rahman Cabinet	Minister of Health	1957	1959	Kinta Utara
Alliance(MIC)	V. T. Sambanthan	Second Rahman Cabinet	Minister of Works, Post and Telecommunications	1959	1964	Sungei Siput
Alliance(MIC)	V. T. Sambanthan	Third Rahman Cabinet	Minister of Works, Post and Telecommunications	1964	1969	Sungei Siput
Alliance(MIC)	V. T. Sambanthan	Fourth Rahman Cabinet	Minister of Works, Post and Telecommunications	1969	1969	Sungei Siput
BN-MIC	V. T. Sambanthan	First Razak Cabinet	Minister of Works, Post and Telecommunications	1970		Sungei Siput
BN-MIC	V. T. Sambanthan	First Razak Cabinet	Minister of National Unity		1974	Sungei Siput
BN-MIC	V. Manickavasagam	Third Rahman Cabinet	Minister of Labour	1964	1969	Klang
BN-MIC	V. Manickavasagam	Fourth Rahman Cabinet	Minister of Transport	1969		
BN-MIC	V. Manickavasagam	First Razak Cabinet	Minister of Labour and Manpower	1970	1974	
BN-MIC	V. Manickavasagam	Second Razak Cabinet	Minister of Communications	1974	1976	Pelabohan Kelang
BN-MIC	V. Manickavasagam	First Hussein Cabinet	Minister of Communications	1976	1978	Pelabohan Kelang
BN-MIC	V. Manickavasagam	Second Hussein Cabinet	Minister of Transport	1978		Pelabohan Kelang
BN-MIC	Samy Vellu	Second Hussein Cabinet	Minister of Works and Public Amenities		1981	Sungei Siput
BN-MIC	Samy Vellu	First Mahathir Cabinet	Minister of Works and Public Amenities	1981	1982	Sungei Siput
BN-MIC	Samy Vellu	Second Mahathir Cabinet	Minister of Works and Public Amenities	1982		Sungei Siput
BN-MIC	Samy Vellu	Second Mahathir Cabinet	Minister of Works		1986	Sungei Siput
BN-MIC	Samy Vellu	Third Mahathir Cabinet	Minister of Works	1986	1989	Sungei Siput
BN-MIC	Samy Vellu	Third Mahathir Cabinet	Minister of Energy, Telecommunications and Posts	1989	1990	Sungei Siput
BN-MIC	Samy Vellu	Fourth Mahathir Cabinet	Minister of Energy, Telecommunications and Posts	1990	1995	Sungei Siput
BN-MIC	Samy Vellu	Fifth Mahathir Cabinet	Minister of Works	1995	1999	Sungei Siput
BN-MIC	Samy Vellu	Sixth Mahathir Cabinet	Minister of Works	1999	2003	Sungei Siput
BN-MIC	Samy Vellu	First Abdullah Cabinet	Minister of Works	2003	2004	Sungei Siput
BN-MIC	Samy Vellu	Second Abdullah Cabinet	Minister of Works	2004	2008	Sungei Siput
BN-MIC	Subramaniam Sathasivam	Third Abdullah Cabinet	Minister of Human Resources	2008	2009	Segamat
BN-MIC	Subramaniam Sathasivam	First Najib Cabinet	Minister of Human Resources	2009	2013	Segamat
BN-MIC	Subramaniam Sathasivam	Second Najib Cabinet	Minister of Health	2013	2018	Segamat
BN-MIC	Palanivel Govindasamy	First Najib Cabinet	Minister in the Prime Minister's Department	2011	2013	Senator
BN-MIC	Palanivel Govindasamy	Second Najib Cabinet	Minister of Natural Resources and Environment	2013	2015	Senator
PH-DAP	Kulasegaran Murugeson	Seventh Mahathir Cabinet	Minister of Human Resources	2018	2020	Ipoh Barat
PH-DAP	Gobind Singh Deo	Seventh Mahathir Cabinet	Minister of Communications and Multimedia	2018	2020	Puchong
PH-PKR	Xavier Jayakumar	Seventh Mahathir Cabinet	Minister of Water, Land and Natural Resources	2018	2020	Kuala Langat
HINDRAF	Waytha Moorthy Ponnusamy	Seventh Mahathir Cabinet	Minister in the Prime Minister's Department (National Unity and Social Wellbeing)	2018	2020	Senator
BN-MIC	Saravanan Murugan	Muhyiddin Cabinet	Minister of Human Resources	2020	2021	Tapah
BN-MIC	Saravanan Murugan	Ismail Sabri Cabinet	Minister of Human Resources	2021	2022	Tapah
PH-DAP	Sivakumar Varatharaju Naidu	Anwar Ibrahim Cabinet	Minister of Human Resources	2022	2023	Batu Gajah
PH-DAP	Gobind Singh Deo	Anwar Ibrahim Cabinet	Minister of Digital	2023	Serving	Damansara
PH-PKR	Ramanan Ramakrishnan	Anwar Ibrahim Cabinet	Minister of Human Resources	2025	Serving	Sungai Buloh

== List of Deputy Ministers ==
Party	Name	Cabinet	Portfolio	Year elected	Year left	Constituency
Alliance(MIC)	V. Manickavasagam	Second Rahman Cabinet	Assistant Minister of Labour	1961	1962	Klang
Alliance(MIC)	V. Manickavasagam	Second Rahman Cabinet	Assistant Minister of Labour and Social Welfare	1962	1962	Klang
BN-MIC	Athi Nahappan	First Hussein Cabinet	Deputy Minister of Law			Senator
BN-MIC	Subramaniam Sinniah	First Hussein Cabinet	Deputy Minister of Local Government and Federal Territories		1978	Damansara
BN-MIC	Subramaniam Sinniah	Second Mahathir Cabinet	Deputy Minister of Housing and Local Government	1982	1986	Segamat
BN-MIC	Subramaniam Sinniah	Third Mahathir Cabinet		1986	1990	Segamat
BN-MIC	Subramaniam Sinniah	Fifth Mahathir Cabinet	Deputy Minister of Domestic Trade and Consumerism	1995	1999	Segamat
BN-MIC	Subramaniam Sinniah	Sixth Mahathir Cabinet	Deputy Minister of Domestic Trade and Consumerism	1999	2003	Segamat
BN-MIC	Subramaniam Sinniah	First Abdullah Cabinet	Deputy Minister of Domestic Trade and Consumerism			Segamat
BN-MIC	K. Pathmanaban	First Hussein Cabinet	Deputy Minister of Labour and Manpower			Telok Kemang
BN-MIC	K. Pathmanaban	Second Hussein Cabinet	Deputy Minister of Labour and Manpower	1978	1981	Telok Kemang
BN-MIC	K. Pathmanaban	First Mahathir Cabinet	Deputy Minister of Health	1981	1981	Telok Kemang
BN-MIC	K. Pathmanaban	Second Mahathir Cabinet	Deputy Minister of Health	1982	1986	Telok Kemang
BN-MIC	K. Pathmanaban	Third Mahathir Cabinet	Deputy Minister of Health	1986		Telok Kemang
BN-MIC	K. Pathmanaban	Third Mahathir Cabinet	Deputy Minister of Human Resources		1990	Telok Kemang
BN-MIC	Samy Vellu	Second Hussein Cabinet	Deputy Minister of Housing and Local Government	1978		Sungei Siput
BN-MIC	Prof Dr T. Marimuthu	Fourth Mahathir Cabinet	Deputy Minister of Agriculture	1993	1995	Telok Kemang
BN-MIC	M. Mahalingam	Fourth Mahathir Cabinet	Deputy Minister of Human Resources	1993	1995	Kapar
BN-MIC	K Kumaran	Fifth Mahathir Cabinet	Deputy Minister of Rural Development	1995	1999	Tapah
BN-PPP	M. Kayveas	First Abdullah Cabinet	Deputy Minister in the Prime Minister's Department	2003	2004	Senator
BN-PPP	M. Kayveas	Second Abdullah Cabinet	Deputy Minister in the Prime Minister's Department	2004	2008	Taiping
BN-MIC	Palanivel Govindasamy	First Abdullah Cabinet	Deputy Minister of Rural Development	2003	2004	Hulu Selangor
BN-MIC	Palanivel Govindasamy	Second Abdullah Cabinet	Deputy Minister of Women, Family and Community Development	2004	2008	Hulu Selangor
BN-MIC	Palanivel Govindasamy	First Najib Cabinet	Deputy Minister of Plantation Industries and Commodities	2010	2011	Senator
BN-MIC	S. Veerasingam	Second Abdullah Cabinet	Deputy Minister of Domestic Trade and Consumerism	2004	2008	Tapah
BN-MIC	S. Sothinathan	Second Abdullah Cabinet	Deputy Minister for Natural Resources and Environment	2004	2008	Telok Kemang
BN-MIC	Saravanan Murugan	Third Abdullah Cabinet	Deputy Minister of Federal Territories	2008	2009	Tapah
BN-MIC	Saravanan Murugan	First Najib Cabinet	Deputy Minister of Federal Territories and Urban Wellbeing	2009	2013	Tapah
BN-MIC	Saravanan Murugan	Second Najib Cabinet	Deputy Minister of Youth and Sports	2013	2018	Tapah
BN-MIC	Devamany S. Krishnasamy	Third Abdullah Cabinet	Deputy Minister in the Prime Minister's Department	2008	2009	Cameron Highlands
BN-MIC	Devamany S. Krishnasamy	First Najib Cabinet	Deputy Minister in the Prime Minister's Department	2009	2013	Cameron Highlands
BN-MIC	Devamany S. Krishnasamy	Second Najib Cabinet	Deputy Minister in the Prime Minister's Department	2016	2018	Senator
BN-PPP	Murugiah Thopasamy	Third Abdullah Cabinet	Deputy Minister in the Prime Minister's Department	2008	2009	Senator
BN-PPP	Murugiah Thopasamy	First Najib Cabinet	Deputy Minister in the Prime Minister's Department	2009	2013	
BN-GERAKAN	A. Kohilan Pillay	Third Abdullah Cabinet	Deputy Minister of Plantation Industries and Commodities	2008	2009	Senator
BN-GERAKAN	A. Kohilan Pillay	First Najib Cabinet	Deputy Minister of Foreign Affairs	2009	2013	Senator
BN-PPP	Maglin Dennis d' Cruz	First Najib Cabinet	Deputy Minister of Information, Communications and Culture	2010	2013	Senator
BN-HINDRAF	Waytha Moorthy Ponnusamy	Second Najib Cabinet	Deputy Minister in the Prime Minister's Department	2013	2014	Senator
BN-MIC	Kamalanathan Panchanathan	Second Najib Cabinet	Deputy Minister of Education	2013	2015	Hulu Selangor
BN-myPPP	Loga Bala Mohan Jaganathan	Second Najib Cabinet	Deputy Minister of Federal Territories	2013	2018	Senator
PH-PKR	Sivarasa Rasiah	Seventh Mahathir Cabinet	Deputy Minister of Rural Development	2018	2020	Sungai Buloh
PN-PPBM	Edmund Santhara Kumar Ramanaidu	Muhyiddin Cabinet	Depity Minister of Federal Territories	2020	2021	Segamat
PN-PPBM	Edmund Santhara Kumar Ramanaidu	Ismail Sabri Cabinet	Deputy Minister of Tourism, Arts and Culture	2021	2022	Segamat
PH-DAP	Ramkarpal Singh Karpal	Anwar Ibrahim Cabinet	Deputy Minister in the Prime Minister's Department (Law and Institutional Reform)	2022	2023	Bukit Gelugor
PH-DAP	Kulasegaran Murugeson	Anwar Ibrahim Cabinet	Deputy Minister in the Prime Minister's Department (Law and Institutional Reform)	2023	Serving	Ipoh Barat
PH-PKR	Saraswathy Kandasami	Anwar Ibrahim Cabinet	Deputy Minister of Entrepreneur Development and Cooperatives	2022	2023	Senator
PH-PKR	Ramanan Ramakrishnan	Anwar Ibrahim Cabinet	Deputy Minister of Entrepreneur Development and Cooperatives	2023	2025	Sungai Buloh
PH-PKR	Saraswathy Kandasami	Anwar Ibrahim Cabinet	Deputy Minister of National Unity	2023	2025	Senator
