= Deputy Minister of Human Resources (Malaysia) =

Malaysian government deputy minister

- Timbalan Menteri Sumber Manusia
- Coat of Arms of Government of Malaysia
- Incumbent; Khairul Firdaus Akbar Khan since 17 December 2025
- Ministry of Human Resources
- Style: Yang Berhormat
- Member of: Cabinet of Malaysia
- Reports to: Prime Minister; Minister of Human Resources
- Seat: Putrajaya
- Appointer: Yang di-Pertuan Agong; on advice of the Prime Minister
- Term length: No term fixed
- Inaugural holder: V. Manickavasagam (as Assistant Minister of Labour)

The Deputy Minister of Human Resources (Malay: Timbalan Menteri Sumber Manusia; Chinese: 人力资源部副部长; Tamil: மனித வளத்துறை துணை அமைச்சர் ) is a Malaysian cabinet position serving as deputy head of the Ministry of Human Resources.

== List of Deputy Ministers of Human Resources ==
The following individuals have been appointed as Deputy Minister of Human Resources, or any of its precedent titles:

Colour key (for political coalition/parties):

Coalition	Component party	Timeline
Alliance Party	Malaysian Indian Congress (MIC)	1957–1973
Alliance Party	United Malays National Organisation (UMNO)	1957–1973
Alliance Party	Malaysian Chinese Association (MCA)	1957–1973
Barisan Nasional (BN)	Malaysian Indian Congress (MIC)	1973–present
Barisan Nasional (BN)	United Malays National Organisation (UMNO)	1973–present
Barisan Nasional (BN)	Sabah People's United Front (BERJAYA)	1976–1986
Barisan Nasional (BN)	United Sabah National Organisation (USNO)	1973–1975, 1976–1984, 1986–1993
Pakatan Harapan (PH)	National Trust Party (AMANAH)	2015–present
Pakatan Harapan (PH)	People's Justice Party (PKR)	2015–present
Perikatan Nasional (PN)	Malaysian Islamic Party (PAS)	2020–present
Gabungan Rakyat Sabah (GRS)	Direct Member	2022–

=== Assistant Minister of Labour ===
Portrait	Name (Birth–Death) Constituency	Political coalition	Political party	Took office	Left office	Prime Minister (Cabinet)
	V. Manickavasagam (1926–1979); MP for Klang	Alliance	MIC	1961	1962	Tunku Abdul Rahman (II)
	Lee San Choon (1935–2023); MP for Segamat Selatan	BN	MCA			Abdul Razak Hussein (I)
Post rebranded into Assistant Minister of Labour and Social Welfare
=== Assistant Minister of Labour and Social Welfare ===
Portrait	Name (Birth–Death) Constituency	Political coalition	Political party	Took office	Left office	Prime Minister (Cabinet)
	V. Manickavasagam (1926–1979); MP for Klang	BN	MIC	1962	1964	Tunku Abdul Rahman (II)
Post rebranded into Deputy Minister of Labour and Manpower
=== Deputy Minister of Labour and Manpower ===
Portrait	Name (Birth–Death) Constituency	Political coalition	Political party	Took office	Left office	Prime Minister (Cabinet)
	Hassan Adli Arshad (?–?); MP for Bagan Datok	BN	UMNO	1974	1976	Abdul Razak Hussein (II)
	Abdullah Majid (?–?); MP for Raub	BN	UMNO	1976	31 December 1976	Hussein Onn (I
	K. Pathmanaban (1938–2001); MP for Telok Kemang	BN	MIC	1 January 1977	1981	Hussein Onn (I • II)
	Zakaria Abdul Rahman (?–?); MP for Besut	BN	UMNO	17 July 1981	7 June 1983	Mahathir Mohamad (I • II)
	William Lye Chee Hien (?–?); MP for Gaya	BN	BERJAYA	17 July 1981	7 June 1983	Mahathir Mohamad (I • II)
Post rebranded into Deputy Minister of Labour
=== Deputy Minister of Labour ===
Portrait	Name (Birth–Death) Constituency	Political coalition	Political party	Took office	Left office	Prime Minister (Cabinet)
	Zakaria Abdul Rahman (?–?); MP for Besut	BN	UMNO	7 June 1983	10 August 1986	Mahathir Mohamad (II)
	William Lye Chee Hien (?–?); MP for Gaya	BN	BERJAYA	7 June 1983	10 August 1986	Mahathir Mohamad (II)
	Wan Abu Bakar Wan Mohamad (?–?); MP for Jerantut	BN	UMNO	11 August 1986	20 May 1987	Mahathir Mohamad (III)
	Kalakau Untol (?–?); MP for Tuaran	BN	USNO	11 August 1986	26 October 1990	Mahathir Mohamad (III)
	K. Pathmanaban (1938–2001); MP for Telok Kemang	BN	MIC	20 May 1987	26 October 1990	Mahathir Mohamad (III)
Post rebranded into Deputy Minister of Human Resources
=== Deputy Minister of Human Resources ===
Portrait	Name (Birth–Death) Constituency	Political coalition	Political party	Took office	Left office	Prime Minister (Cabinet)
	M. Mahalingam (?–?); MP for Kapar	BN	MIC	1 December 1993	3 May 1995	Mahathir Mohamad (IIII)
	Abdul Kadir Sheikh Fadzir (?–?); MP for Kulim-Bandar Baharu	BN	UMNO	8 May 1995	12 November 1996	Mahathir Mohamad (V)
	Affifudin Omar (?–?); MP for Padang Terap	BN	UMNO	12 November 1996	14 December 1999	Mahathir Mohamad (V)
	Abdul Latiff Ahmad (b.1958); MP for Mersing	BN	UMNO	15 December 1999	26 March 2004	Mahathir Mohamad (VI); Abdullah Ahmad Badawi (I)
	Abdul Rahman Bakar (b.1952); MP for Marang	BN	UMNO	27 March 2004	18 March 2008	Abdullah Ahmad Badawi (II)
	Noraini Ahmad (b.1967); MP for Parit Sulong	BN	UMNO	19 March 2008	9 April 2009	Abdullah Ahmad Badawi (III)
	Maznah Mazlan (b.?); Senator	BN	UMNO	10 April 2009	15 May 2013	Najib Razak (I)
	Ismail Abdul Muttalib (b.1954); MP for Maran	BN	UMNO	16 May 2013	9 May 2018	Najib Razak (II)
	Mahfuz Omar (b.1957); MP for Pokok Sena	PH	AMANAH	2 July 2018	24 February 2020	Mahathir Mohamad (VII)
	Awang Hashim (b.?); MP for Pendang	PN	PAS	10 March 2020	24 November 2022	Muhyiddin Yassin (I); Ismail Sabri Yaakob (I)
	Mustapha Sakmud (b.1968); MP for Sepanggar	PH	PKR	10 December 2022	12 December 2023	Anwar Ibrahim (I)
	Abdul Rahman Mohamad (b.1964); MP for Lipis	BN	UMNO	12 December 2023	17 December 2025	Anwar Ibrahim (I)
	Khairul Firdaus Akbar Khan (b.1983); MP for Batu Sapi	GRS	Direct Member	17 December 2025	Incumbent	Anwar Ibrahim (I)

== See also ==
- Minister of Human Resources (Malaysia)
