= Anwar Ibrahim cabinet =

Government of Malaysia since 2022

- 23rd Cabinet of Malaysia
- 2022–present
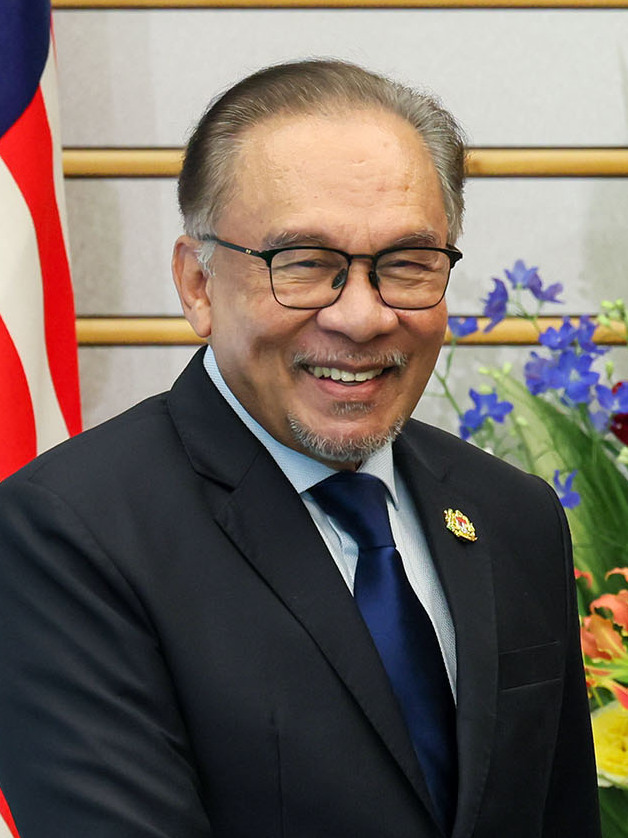
- Date formed: 3 December 2022

People and organisations
- Monarch: Abdullah (2019–2024); Ibrahim Iskandar (2024–present)
- Prime Minister: Anwar Ibrahim
- Deputy Prime Minister: Ahmad Zahid Hamidi; Fadillah Yusof
- No. of ministers: 32 ministers; 30 deputy ministers
- Total no. of members: 62 members
- Member parties: See member parties
- Status in legislature: Two-thirds majority (coalition)
- Opposition parties: See opposition parties
- Opposition leader: Hamzah Zainudin (2022–2026); Ahmad Samsuri Mokhtar (2026); Hamzah Zainudin (2026–present)

History
- Election: 2022 general election
- Legislature term: 15th
- Predecessor: Ismail Sabri cabinet

The Anwar Ibrahim cabinet is the current federal cabinet of Malaysia, formed on 3 December 2022, nine days after Anwar Ibrahim took office as the 10th Prime Minister of Malaysia. The composition of the cabinet was announced by Anwar a day earlier on 2 December 2022, consisting of most of the political coalitions and parties represented in the 15th Parliament. It was the 23rd cabinet of Malaysia formed since independence. Although Perikatan Nasional (PN) was also invited to join the government, it decided to decline the invitation and instead formed the opposition. The government is often referred to as "unity government" (Malay: Kerajaan Perpaduan) or informally, Madani government (Malay: Kerajaan Madani).

== Member parties ==
Coalition	Parties	Appointed minister	Appointed deputy
PH	PKR	9	6
PH	DAP	5	7
PH	AMANAH	2	2
PH	Total	16	15
BN	UMNO	7	5
BN	PBRS	1	—N/a
BN	MCA	—N/a	—N/a
BN	MIC	—N/a	—N/a
BN	PPP	—N/a	—N/a
BN	Total	8	5
GPS	PBB	3	4
GPS	PDP	1	—N/a
GPS	PRS	1	1
GPS	SUPP	—N/a	1
GPS	Total	5	6
GRS	GRS	1	1
GRS	PBS	—N/a	1
GRS	PGRS	—N/a	—N/a
GRS	LDP	—N/a	—N/a
GRS	PCS	—N/a	—N/a
GRS	PHRS	—N/a	—N/a
GRS	UPKO	—N/a	—N/a
GRS	Total	1	2
Not a coalition			
Not a coalition	WARISAN	—N/a	1
Not a coalition	KDM	—N/a	—N/a
Not a coalition	PBM	—N/a	—N/a
Not a coalition	STAR	—N/a	—N/a
Not a coalition	Independent	2	1

== Opposition parties ==
Coalition	Parties
PN	PAS
PN	BERSATU
PN	GERAKAN
PN	WAWASAN
PN	MIPP
PN	PEJUANG
Not a coalition	MUDA

== Cabinet ==
Office	Portrait	Incumbent	Party	Ref.
Prime Minister; Candidacy 20 October 2022; Elected 19 November 2022; Assumed office 24 November 2022		Anwar Ibrahim; MP for Tambun	PH (PKR)	
Minister of Finance; Announced 2 December 2022; Assumed office 3 December 2022		Anwar Ibrahim; MP for Tambun	PH (PKR)	
Deputy Prime Minister and Minister of Rural and Regional Development; Announced 2 December 2022; Assumed office 3 December 2022		Ahmad Zahid Hamidi; MP for Bagan Datuk	BN (UMNO)	
Deputy Prime Minister; Announced 2 December 2022; Assumed office 3 December 2022		Fadillah Yusof; MP for Petra Jaya	GPS (PBB)	
Minister of Energy Transition and Water Transformation (Note: The office was known as Minister of Energy Transition and Public Utilities prior 7 February 2024.); Assumed office 12 December 2023		Fadillah Yusof; MP for Petra Jaya	GPS (PBB)	
Minister of Transport; Announced TBA; Assumed office TBA	Vacant			
Minister of Agriculture and Food Security; Announced 2 December 2022; Assumed office 3 December 2022		Mohamad Sabu; MP for Kota Raja	PH (AMANAH)	
Minister of Housing and Local Government (Note: The office was known as Minister of Local Government Development prior 13 December 2023.); Announced 2 December 2022; Assumed office 3 December 2022		Nga Kor Ming; MP for Teluk Intan	PH (DAP)	
Minister of Foreign Affairs; Assumed office 12 December 2023		Mohamad Hasan; MP for Rembau	BN (UMNO)	
Minister of Works; Announced 2 December 2022; Assumed office 3 December 2022		Alexander Nanta Linggi; MP for Kapit	GPS (PBB)	
Minister of Home Affairs; Announced 2 December 2022; Assumed office 3 December 2022		Senator; Saifuddin Nasution Ismail	PH (PKR)	
Minister of Defence; Assumed office 12 December 2023		Mohamed Khaled Nordin; MP for Kota Tinggi	BN (UMNO)	
Minister of Science, Technology and Innovation; Announced 2 December 2022; Assumed office 3 December 2022		Chang Lih Kang; MP for Tanjong Malim	PH (PKR)	
Minister of Women, Family and Community Development; Announced 2 December 2022; Assumed office 3 December 2022		Nancy Shukri; MP for Santubong	GPS (PBB)	
Minister in the Prime Minister's Department (Law and Institutional Reform); Announced 2 December 2022; Assumed office 3 December 2022		Azalina Othman Said; MP for Pengerang	BN (UMNO)	
Minister of Higher Education; Assumed office 12 December 2023		Senator; Zambry Abdul Kadir	BN (UMNO)	
Minister of Tourism, Arts and Culture; Announced 2 December 2022; Assumed office 3 December 2022		Tiong King Sing; MP for Bintulu	GPS (PDP)	
Minister of Communications (Note: The office was known as Minister of Communications and Digital prior 12 December 2023.); Announced 2 December 2022; Assumed office 3 December 2022		Fahmi Fadzil; MP for Lembah Pantai	PH (PKR)	
Minister of Education; Announced 2 December 2022; Assumed office 3 December 2022		Fadhlina Sidek; MP for Nibong Tebal	PH (PKR)	
Minister of National Unity; Announced 2 December 2022; Assumed office 3 December 2022		Aaron Ago Dagang; MP for Kanowit	GPS (PRS)	
Minister in the Prime Minister's Department (Federal Territories); Announced 16 December 2025; Assumed office 17 December 2025		Hannah Yeoh; MP for Segambut	PH (DAP)	
Minister of Investment, Trade and Industry; Announced 16 December 2025; Assumed office 17 December 2025		Johari Abdul Ghani; MP for Titiwangsa	BN (UMNO)	
Minister of Domestic Trade and Costs of Living; Acting from 30 July 2023; Assumed office 12 December 2023		Armizan Mohd Ali; MP for Papar	GRS	
Minister of Digital; Assumed office 12 December 2023		Gobind Singh Deo; MP for Damansara	PH (DAP)	
Minister of Health; Assumed office 12 December 2023		Dzulkefly Ahmad; MP for Kuala Selangor	PH (AMANAH)	
Minister of Finance II; Assumed office 12 December 2023		Senator; Amir Hamzah Azizan	Independent	
Minister of Entrepreneur and Cooperatives Development; Announced 16 December 2025; Assumed office 17 December 2025		Steven Sim Chee Keong; MP for Bukit Mertajam	PH (DAP)	
Minister of Plantation and Commodities; Announced 16 December 2025; Assumed office 17 December 2025		Noraini Ahmad; MP for Parit Sulong	BN (UMNO)	
Minister of Natural Resources and Environmental Sustainability; Announced 16 December 2025; Assumed office 17 December 2025		Arthur Joseph Kurup; MP for Pensiangan	BN (PBRS)	
Minister of Human Resources; Announced 16 December 2025; Assumed office 17 December 2025		Ramanan Ramakrishnan; MP for Sungai Buloh	PH (PKR)	
Minister of Economy; Announced 16 December 2025; Assumed office 17 December 2025		Akmal Nasir; MP for Johor Bahru	PH (PKR)	
Minister in the Prime Minister's Department (Sabah and Sarawak Affairs); Announced 16 December 2025; Assumed office 17 December 2025		Mustapha Sakmud; MP for Sepanggar	PH (PKR)	
Minister in the Prime Minister's Department (Religious Affairs); Announced 16 December 2025; Assumed office 17 December 2025		Senator; Zulkifli Hasan	Independent	
Minister of Youth and Sports; Announced 16 December 2025; Assumed office 17 December 2025		Mohammed Taufiq Johari; MP for Sungai Petani	PH (PKR)	

=== Former ministers ===
Serving in another office

Office	Portrait	Incumbent	Party	Ref.
Minister of Domestic Trade and Costs of Living; Announced 2 December 2022; Assumed office 3 December 2022; Died 23 July 2023		Salahuddin Ayub; MP for Pulai	PH (AMANAH)	
Minister of Defence; Announced 2 December 2022; Assumed office 3 December 2022; Ended 12 December 2023		Mohamad Hasan; MP for Rembau	BN (UMNO)	
Minister of Higher Education; Announced 2 December 2022; Assumed office 3 December 2022; Ended 12 December 2023		Mohamed Khaled Nordin; MP for Kota Tinggi	BN (UMNO)	
Minister of Foreign Affairs; Announced 2 December 2022; Assumed office 3 December 2022; Ended 12 December 2023		Senator; Zambry Abdul Kadir	BN (UMNO)	
Minister in the Prime Minister's Department (Sabah, Sarawak Affairs and Special Functions); Announced 2 December 2022; Assumed office 3 December 2022; Ended 12 December 2023		Armizan Mohd Ali; MP for Papar	GRS	
Minister of Health; Announced 2 December 2022; Assumed office 3 December 2022; Ended 12 December 2023		Zaliha Mustafa; MP for Sekijang	PH (PKR)	
Minister of Economy; Announced 2 December 2022; Assumed office 3 December 2022; Resigned 17 June 2025		Rafizi Ramli; MP for Pandan	PH (PKR)	
Minister in the Prime Minister's Department (Federal Territories); Assumed office 12 December 2023; Ended 17 December 2025		Zaliha Mustafa; MP for Sekijang	PH (PKR)	
Minister of Youth and Sports; Announced 2 December 2022; Assumed office 3 December 2022; Ended 17 December 2025		Hannah Yeoh; MP for Segambut	PH (DAP)	
Minister in the Prime Minister's Department (Religious Affairs); Announced 2 December 2022; Assumed office 3 December 2022; Ended 17 December 2025		Senator; Mohd Na'im Mokhtar	Independent	
Minister of Economy; Acting from 27 June 2025; Ended 17 December 2025		Senator; Amir Hamzah Azizan	Independent	
Minister of Investment, Trade and Industry (Note: The office was known as Minister of International Trade and Industry prior 5 April 2023.); Announced 2 December 2022; Assumed office 3 December 2022; Ended 2 December 2025		Senator; Tengku Zafrul Aziz	PH (PKR) (Note: Zafrul was a member of UMNO until his exit on 30 May 2025 and later opt to join PKR.)	
Minister of Natural Resources and Environmental Sustainability (Note: The office was known as Minister of Natural Resources, Environment and Climate Change prior 12 December 2023.); Announced 2 December 2022; Assumed office 3 December 2022; Resigned 11 July 2025		Nik Nazmi; MP for Setiawangsa	PH (PKR)	
Minister of Natural Resources and Environmental Sustainability; Acting from 11 July 2025; Ended 17 December 2025		Johari Abdul Ghani; MP for Titiwangsa	BN (UMNO)	
Minister of Human Resources; Announced 2 December 2022; Assumed office 3 December 2022; Ended 12 December 2023		Sivakumar Varatharaju; MP for Batu Gajah	PH (DAP)	
Minister of Human Resources; Assumed office 12 December 2023; Ended 17 December 2025		Steven Sim Chee Keong; MP for Bukit Mertajam	PH (DAP)	
Minister of Entrepreneur and Cooperatives Development; Assumed office 3 December 2022; Ended 8 November 2025		Ewon Benedick; MP for Penampang	PH (UPKO)	
Minister of Entrepreneur and Cooperatives Development; Acting from 3 December 2025; Ended 17 December 2025		Alexander Nanta Linggi; MP for Kapit	GPS (PBB)	
Minister of Plantation and Commodities; Assumed office 3 December 2022; Ended 12 December 2023		Fadillah Yusof; MP for Petra Jaya	GPS (PBB)	
Minister of Plantation and Commodities; Assumed office 12 December 2023; Ended 17 December 2025		Johari Abdul Ghani; MP for Titiwangsa	BN (UMNO)	
Minister of Transport; Announced 2 December 2022; Assumed office 3 December 2022; Resigned 10 November 2026		Anthony Loke; MP for Seremban	PH (DAP)	

== Deputy ministers ==
Office	Portrait	Incumbent	Party	Ref.
Deputy Minister in the Prime Minister's Department (Law and Institutional Reform); Assumed office 12 December 2023		M. Kulasegaran; MP for Ipoh Barat	PH (DAP)	
Deputy Minister in the Prime Minister's Department (Religious Affairs); Assumed office 17 December 2025		Senator; Marhamah Rosli	Independent	
Deputy Minister in the Prime Minister's Department (Federal Territories); Assumed office 17 December 2025		Lo Su Fui; MP for Tawau	GRS (PBS)	
Deputy Minister of Finance; Assumed office 17 December 2025		Liew Chin Tong; MP for Iskandar Puteri	PH (DAP)	
Deputy Minister of Economy; Assumed office 17 December 2025		Mohd Shahar Abdullah; MP for Paya Besar	BN (UMNO)	
Deputy Minister of Defence; Assumed office 10 December 2022		Adly Zahari; MP for Alor Gajah	PH (AMANAH)	
Deputy Minister of Home Affairs; Assumed office 10 December 2022		Shamsul Anuar Nasarah; MP for Lenggong	BN (UMNO)	
Deputy Minister of Investment, Trade and Industry (Note: The office was known as Deputy Minister of International Trade and Industry prior 5 April 2023.); Assumed office 17 December 2025		Sim Tze Tzin; MP for Bayan Baru	PH (PKR)	
Deputy Minister of Education; Assumed office 12 December 2023		Wong Kah Woh; MP for Taiping	PH (DAP)	
Deputy Minister of Natural Resources and Environmental Sustainability (Note: The office was known as Deputy Minister of Natural Resources, Environment and Climate Change prior 12 December 2023.); Assumed office 17 December 2025		Syed Ibrahim Syed Noh; MP for Ledang	PH (PKR)	
Deputy Minister of Transport; Assumed office 10 December 2022		Hasbi Habibollah; MP for Limbang	GPS (PBB)	
Deputy Minister of Agriculture and Food Security; Assumed office 17 December 2025		Chan Foong Hin; MP for Kota Kinabalu	PH (DAP)	
Deputy Minister of Health; Assumed office 17 December 2025		Hanifah Hajar Taib; MP for Mukah	GPS (PBB)	
Deputy Minister of Tourism, Arts and Culture; Assumed office 17 December 2025		Chiew Choon Man; MP for Miri	PH (PKR)	
Deputy Minister of Housing and Local Government (Note: The office was known as Deputy Minister of Local Government Development prior 13 December 2023.); Assumed office 12 December 2023		Aiman Athirah Sabu; MP for Sepang	PH (AMANAH)	
Deputy Minister of Foreign Affairs; Assumed office 17 December 2025		Lukanisman Awang Sauni; MP for Sibuti	GPS (PBB)	
Deputy Minister of Higher Education; Assumed office 17 December 2025		Adam Adli Abdul Halim; MP for Hang Tuah Jaya	PH (PKR)	
Deputy Minister of Human Resources; Assumed office 17 December 2025		Khairul Firdaus Akbar Khan; MP for Batu Sapi	GRS	
Deputy Minister of Domestic Trade and Costs of Living; Assumed office 10 December 2022		Senator; Fuziah Salleh	PH (PKR)	
Deputy Minister of Entrepreneur and Cooperatives Development; Assumed office 17 December 2025		Mohamad Alamin; MP for Kimanis	BN (UMNO)	
Deputy Minister of Rural and Regional Development; Assumed office 10 December 2022		Rubiah Wang; MP for Kota Samarahan	GPS (PBB)	
Deputy Minister of Works; Assumed office 12 December 2023		Ahmad Maslan; MP for Pontian	BN (UMNO)	
Deputy Minister of Science, Technology and Innovation; Assumed office 12 December 2023		Mohammad Yusof Apdal; MP for Lahad Datu	WARISAN	
Deputy Minister of Energy Transition and Water Transformation (Note: The office was known as Deputy Minister of Energy Transition and Public Utilities prior 7 February 2024.); Assumed office 17 December 2025		Abdul Rahman Mohamad; MP for Lipis	BN (UMNO)	
Deputy Minister of Plantation and Commodities; Assumed office 17 December 2025		Huang Tiong Sii; MP for Sarikei	GPS (SUPP)	
Deputy Minister of Women, Family and Community Development; Assumed office 17 December 2025		Lim Hui Ying; MP for Tanjong	PH (DAP)	
Deputy Minister of National Unity; Assumed office 17 December 2025		Yuneswaran Ramaraj; MP for Segamat	PH (PKR)	
Deputy Minister of Youth and Sports; Assumed office 17 December 2025		Mordi Bimol; MP for Mas Gading	PH (DAP)	
Deputy Minister of Communications (Note: The office was known as Deputy Minister of Communications and Digital prior 12 December 2023.); Assumed office 10 December 2022		Teo Nie Ching; MP for Kulai	PH (DAP)	
Deputy Minister of Digital; Assumed office 12 December 2023		Wilson Ugak Kumbong; MP for Hulu Rajang	GPS (SUPP)	

=== Former deputy ministers ===
Serving in another office

Office	Portrait	Incumbent	Party	Ref.
Deputy Minister in the Prime Minister's Department (Law and Institutional Reform); Assumed office 10 December 2022; Ended 12 December 2023		Ramkarpal Singh; MP for Bukit Gelugor	PH (DAP)	
Deputy Minister in the Prime Minister's Department (Sabah, Sarawak Affairs and Special Functions); Assumed office 10 December 2022; Ended 12 December 2023		Wilson Ugak Kumbong; MP for Hulu Rajang	GPS (SUPP)	
Deputy Minister in the Prime Minister's Department (Religious Affairs); Assumed office 12 December 2023; Ended 17 December 2025		Senator; Zulkifli Hasan	Independent	
Deputy Minister of Finance; Assumed office 10 December 2022; Ended 12 December 2023		Ahmad Maslan; MP for Pontian	BN (UMNO)	
Deputy Minister of Finance; Assumed office 10 December 2022; Ended 12 December 2023		Steven Sim Chee Keong; MP for Bukit Mertajam	PH (DAP)	
Deputy Minister of Finance; Assumed office 12 December 2023; Ended 17 December 2025		Lim Hui Ying; MP for Tanjong	PH (DAP)	
Deputy Minister of Economy; Assumed office 10 December 2022; Ended 17 December 2025		Hanifah Hajar Taib; MP for Mukah	GPS (PBB)	
Deputy Minister of Investment, Trade and Industry (Note: The office was known as Deputy Minister of International Trade and Industry prior 5 April 2023.); Assumed office 10 December 2022; Ended 17 December 2025		Liew Chin Tong; MP for Iskandar Puteri	PH (DAP)	
Deputy Minister of Education; Assumed office 10 December 2022; Ended 12 December 2023		Lim Hui Ying; MP for Tanjong	PH (DAP)	
Deputy Minister of Natural Resources and Environmental Sustainability (Note: The office was known as Deputy Minister of Natural Resources, Environment and Climate Change prior 12 December 2023.); Assumed office 10 December 2022; Ended 17 December 2025		Huang Tiong Sii; MP for Sarikei	GPS (SUPP)	
Deputy Minister of Agriculture and Food Security; Assumed office 10 December 2022; Ended 12 December 2023		Chan Foong Hin; MP for Kota Kinabalu	PH (DAP)	
Deputy Minister of Agriculture and Food Security; Assumed office 12 December 2023; Ended 17 December 2025		Arthur Joseph Kurup; MP for Pensiangan	BN (PBRS)	
Deputy Minister of Health; Assumed office 10 December 2022; Ended 17 December 2025		Lukanisman Awang Sauni; MP for Sibuti	GPS (PBB)	
Deputy Minister of Tourism, Arts and Culture; Assumed office 10 December 2022; Ended 17 December 2025		Khairul Firdaus Akbar Khan; MP for Batu Sapi	GRS	
Deputy Minister of Local Government Development; Assumed office 10 December 2022; Ended 12 December 2023		Akmal Nasrullah Mohd Nasir; MP for Johor Bahru	PH (PKR)	
Deputy Minister of Foreign Affairs; Assumed office 10 December 2022; Ended 17 December 2025		Mohamad Alamin; MP for Kimanis	BN (UMNO)	
Deputy Minister of Higher Education; Assumed office 10 December 2022; Ended 12 December 2023		Mohammad Yusof Apdal; MP for Lahad Datu	WARISAN	
Deputy Minister of Higher Education; Assumed office 12 December 2023; Ended 17 December 2025		Mustapha Sakmud; MP for Sepanggar	PH (PKR)	
Deputy Minister of Human Resources; Assumed office 10 December 2022; Ended 12 December 2023		Mustapha Sakmud; MP for Sepanggar	PH (PKR)	
Deputy Minister of Human Resources; Assumed office 12 December 2023; Ended 17 December 2025		Abdul Rahman Mohamad; MP for Lipis	BN (UMNO)	
Deputy Minister of Entrepreneur and Cooperatives Development; Assumed office 10 December 2022; Ended 12 December 2023		Senator; Saraswathy Kandasami	PH (PKR)	
Deputy Minister of Entrepreneur and Cooperatives Development; Assumed office 12 December 2023; Ended 17 December 2025		Ramanan Ramakrishnan; MP for Sungai Buloh	PH (PKR)	
Deputy Minister of Works; Assumed office 10 December 2022; Ended 12 December 2023		Abdul Rahman Mohamad; MP for Lipis	BN (UMNO)	
Deputy Minister of Science, Technology and Innovation; Assumed office 10 December 2022; Ended 12 December 2023		Arthur Joseph Kurup; MP for Pensiangan	BN (PBRS)	
Deputy Minister of Energy Transition and Water Transformation (Note: The office was known as Deputy Minister of Energy Transition and Public Utilities prior 7 February 2024.); Assumed office 12 December 2023; Ended 17 December 2025		Akmal Nasrullah Mohd Nasir; MP for Johor Bahru	PH (PKR)	
Deputy Minister of Plantation and Commodities; Assumed office 10 December 2022; Ended 12 December 2023		Siti Aminah Aching; MP for Beaufort	BN (UMNO)	
Deputy Minister of Plantation and Commodities; Assumed office 12 December 2023; Ended 17 December 2025		Chan Foong Hin; MP for Kota Kinabalu	PH (DAP)	
Deputy Minister of Women, Family and Community Development; Assumed office 10 December 2022; Ended 12 December 2023		Aiman Athirah Sabu; MP for Sepang	PH (AMANAH)	
Deputy Minister of Women, Family and Community Development; Assumed office 12 December 2023; Ended 17 December 2025		Noraini Ahmad; MP for Parit Sulong	BN (UMNO)	
Deputy Minister of National Unity; Assumed office 12 December 2023; Ended 17 December 2025		Senator; Saraswathy Kandasami	PH (PKR)	
Deputy Minister of Youth and Sports; Assumed office 10 December 2022; Ended 17 December 2025		Adam Adli Abdul Halim; MP for Hang Tuah Jaya	PH (PKR)	

== Changes ==
=== Changes in result of the new incoming cabinet ===
From the appointment of Prime Minister Anwar Ibrahim to 12 December 2023:

- The number of Deputy Prime Ministers increased from one to two.
- The number of Deputy Ministers of several ministries decreased from two to one.
- No Deputy Ministers for Ministry of National Unity and for the Minister in the Prime Minister' Department (Religious Affairs).
- Ministry of Agriculture and Food Industries was renamed to Ministry of Agriculture and Food Security.
- Ministry of Communications and Multimedia was renamed to Ministry of Communications and Digital.
- Ministry of Domestic Trade and Consumer Affairs was renamed to Ministry of Domestic Trade and Living Costs.
- Ministry of Energy and Natural Resources and Ministry of Environment and Water were merged into a single ministry named Ministry of Natural Resources, Environment and Climate Change.
- Ministry of Federal Territories was transferred the Prime Minister's Department as a portfolio and a department under the Prime Minister.
- Ministry of Housing and Local Government was renamed to Ministry of Local Government Development. Housing portfolio remains in this ministry for now.
- Ministry of Rural Development was renamed to Ministry of Rural and Regional Development.
- Economic affairs portfolio under the Prime Minister's Department was transferred to the returning Ministry of Economy. It was previously the Ministry of Economic Affairs under the seventh Mahathir cabinet.
- Ministry of International Trade and Industry was renamed to Ministry of Investment, Trade and Industry.

=== Changes in result of the reshuffling on 12 December 2023 ===
Since 12 December 2023:

- Deputy Ministers for Ministry of National Unity and for the Minister in the Prime Minister' Department (Religious Affairs) have been appointed.
- Ministry of Communications and Digital was split to two different ministries, i.e. Ministry of Communications and Ministry of Digital.
- Ministry of Natural Resources, Environment and Climate Change was split to two different ministries, i.e. Ministry of Natural Resources and Environmental Sustainability and Ministry of Energy Transition and Water Transformation.
- Federal Territories Department under the Prime Minister's Department is given a specific minister.
- Ministry of Local Government Development was renamed to Ministry of Housing and Local Government.

=== Changes in result of the reshuffling on 17 December 2025 ===
Since 17 December 2025:

- Deputy Minister for the Minister in the Prime Minister' Department (Federal Territories) have been appointed.

== Unity Government Secretariat ==
The Unity Government formed a secretariat to coordinate the activities of its component coalitions and parties in February 2023. Deputy Prime Minister, Chairman of the Barisan Nasional (BN) and President of the United Malays National Organisation (UMNO) Ahmad Zahid Hamidi added that the inaugural meeting of the secretariat would pay attention to finding common ground between the manifestos of its different components and strengthening the government. The inaugural secretariat meeting was held at the headquarters of UMNO and attended by Prime Minister, Chairman of the Pakatan Harapan (PH) and President of the People's Justice Party (PKR) Anwar Ibrahim, Minister of Transport, Deputy President of PH and Secretary-General of the Democratic Action Party (DAP) Anthony Loke Siew Fook and among others. This marked the first time Anwar had revisited the headquarters of UMNO in over 20 years after his sacking from UMNO and removal from government positions in September 1998 that sparked the Reformasi movement and the first time a DAP leader had visited the headquarters of UMNO. Anwar subsequently announced the formation of three secretariat committees namely the elections committee, the strategy committee and the government and political agenda monitoring committee.

The leaders of the secretariat are:

- Chairman
  - Anwar Ibrahim (Prime Minister, Chairman of PH & President of PKR)
- Deputy Chairmen
  - Ahmad Zahid Hamidi (Deputy Prime Minister, Chairman of BN & President of UMNO)
  - Abang Abdul Rahman Johari Abang Openg (Premier of Sarawak, Chairman of the Gabungan Parti Sarawak (GPS) & President of the Parti Pesaka Bumiputera Bersatu (PBB))
  - Hajiji Noor (Chief Minister of Sabah, Chairman of the Gabungan Rakyat Sabah (GRS) & President of the Parti Gagasan Rakyat Sabah (GAGASAN))
  - Shafie Apdal (State Leader of the Opposition of Sabah & President of the Heritage Party (WARISAN))
- Secretary-General
  - Fadillah Yusof (Deputy Prime Minister, Acting Secretary-General and Parliamentary Whip of GPS & Senior Vice President of PBB)
- Secretariat Chief
  - Asyraf Wajdi Dusuki (Chairman of the Majlis Amanah Rakyat (MARA) & Secretary-General of UMNO)

The members of the secretariat are:

- Pakatan Harapan (PH)
  - Anwar Ibrahim
  - Saifuddin Nasution Ismail
  - Mohamad Sabu
  - Anthony Loke Siew Fook
  - Ewon Benedick
  - Rafizi Ramli
  - Fahmi Fadzil
  - Adly Zahari
  - Aiman Athirah Sabu
- Barisan Nasional (BN)
  - Ahmad Zahid Hamidi
  - Wee Ka Siong
  - Vigneswaran Sanasee
  - Arthur Joseph Kurup
  - Mohamad Hasan
  - Zambry Abdul Kadir
  - Asyraf Wajdi Dusuki
  - Noraini Ahmad
- Gabungan Parti Sarawak (GPS)
  - Abang Abdul Rahman Johari Abang Openg
  - Fadillah Yusof
  - Alexander Nanta Linggi
  - Tiong King Sing
  - Sim Kui Hian
  - Joseph Salang Gandum
  - Nancy Shukri
- Gabungan Rakyat Sabah (GRS)
  - Hajiji Noor
  - Jeffrey Kitingan
  - Pandikar Amin Mulia
  - Maximus Ongkili
  - Joachim Gunsalam
  - Armizan Mohd Ali
  - Edward Linggu Bukut
- Heritage Party (WARISAN)
  - Shafie Apdal
  - Darell Leiking
  - Azis Jamman
  - Loretto Padua Jr.

== See also ==
- 2023 Malaysian cabinet reshuffle
