= Seventh Mahathir cabinet =

Malaysian government from 2018 to 2020

- 20th Cabinet of Malaysia
- 2018–2020
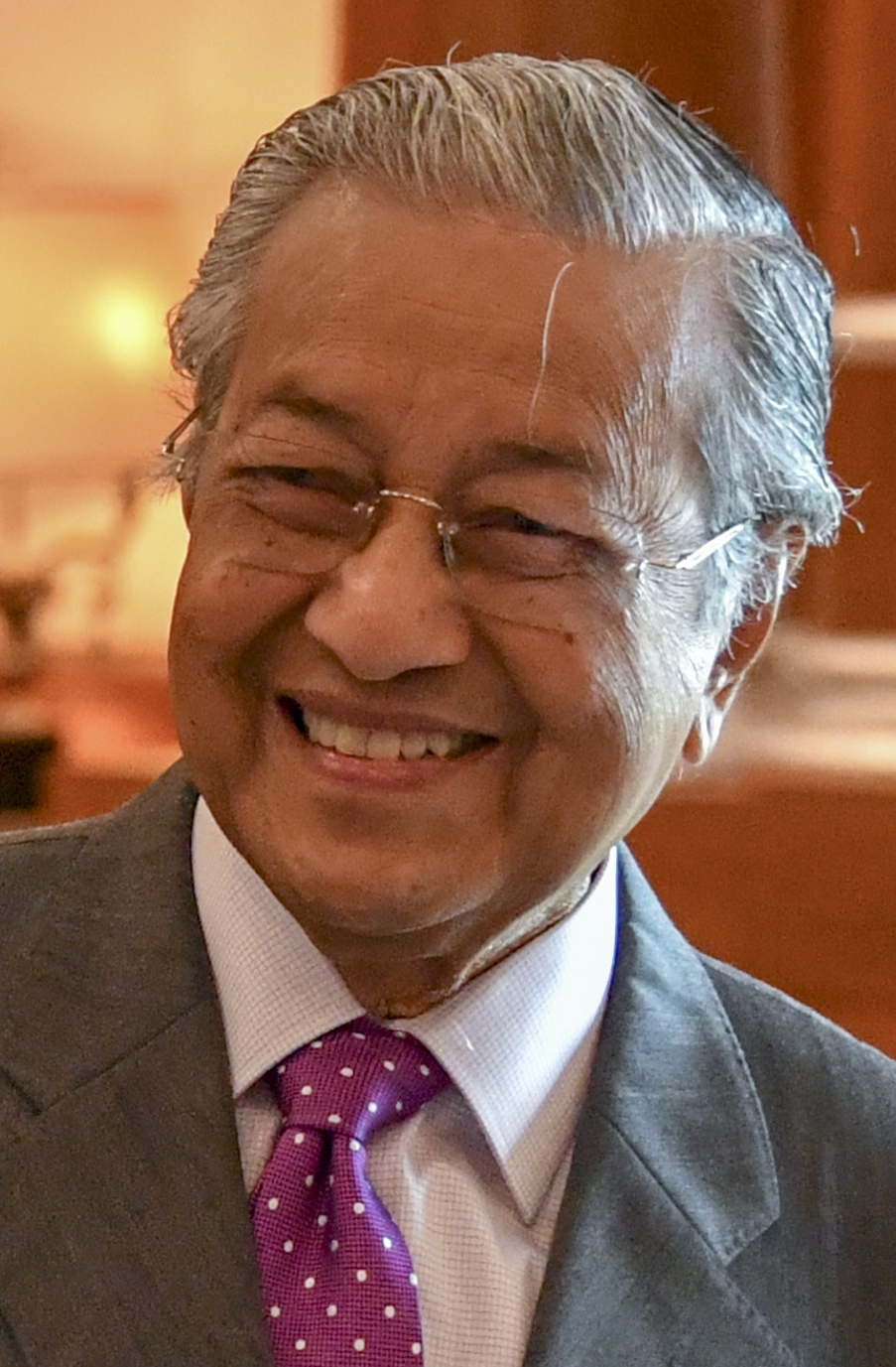
- Date formed: 21 May 2018
- Date dissolved: 24 February 2020

People and organisations
- Head of state: Sultan Muhammad V 2018-2019; Al-Sultan Abdullah 2019-2020
- Head of government: Mahathir Mohamad
- Deputy head of government: Wan Azizah Wan Ismail
- No. of ministers: 28 ministers and 27 deputy ministers
- Total no. of members: 55 members
- Member parties: Pakatan Harapan: PKR; DAP; BERSATU; AMANAH; WARISAN; UPKO; MAP
- Status in legislature: Majority (coalition)
- Opposition parties: Barisan Nasional: UMNO; MCA; MIC; Gabungan Parti Sarawak: PBB; PRS; PDP; SUPP; PAS; PBS; STAR; PBRS; PSB; Independent
- Opposition leaders: Ahmad Zahid Hamidi 2018-2019; Ismail Sabri Yaakob 2019-2020

History
- Election: Malaysian general election, 2018
- Legislature term: 14th Malaysian Parliament
- Budget: 2019, 2020
- Predecessor: Second Najib cabinet
- Successor: Muhyiddin cabinet

Dr. Mahathir Mohamad, being the Prime Minister of Malaysia for the second time on 10 May 2018, formed the seventh Mahathir cabinet after being invited by the Yang di-Pertuan Agong, Sultan Muhammad V to form a new government. It was the 20th cabinet of Malaysia formed since independence. Initially, he announced that the cabinet would be composed of 10 key ministries only representing Pakatan Harapan parties, i.e. Malaysian United Indigenous Party (BERSATU), People's Justice Party (PKR), Democratic Action Party (DAP) and National Trust Party (AMANAH), as he suggested "to being a small Cabinet" rather than to have "a huge Cabinet". On 21 May 2018, that list expanded by 13 ministries. On 2 July 2018, 13 ministers and 23 deputy ministers took office. It was a cabinet of 28 ministers until their fall on 24 February 2020 following Mahathir's resignation.

== Composition ==
=== Full members ===
The federal cabinet consisted of the following ministers:

PKR (7) DAP (6) BERSATU (6) AMANAH (5) WARISAN (3) MAP (1)

Portfolio	Office bearer	Party	Constituency	Term start	Term end
Prime Minister	Tun Dr. Mahathir Mohamad MP	BERSATU	Langkawi	10 May 2018	24 February 2020
Deputy Prime Minister	Dato' Seri Dr. Wan Azizah Wan Ismail MP	PKR	Pandan	21 May 2018	24 February 2020
Ministers in the Prime Minister's Department	Datuk Seri Dr. Mujahid Yusof Rawa MP (Religious Affairs)	AMANAH	Parit Buntar	2 July 2018	24 February 2020
Ministers in the Prime Minister's Department	Datuk Liew Vui Keong MP (Legal Affairs)	WARISAN	Batu Sapi	2 July 2018	24 February 2020
Ministers in the Prime Minister's Department	Senator Waytha Moorthy Ponnusamy (National Unity and Social Well-being)	MAP	Senator	17 July 2018	24 February 2020
Minister of Finance	Lim Guan Eng MP	DAP	Bagan	21 May 2018	24 February 2020
Minister of Economic Affairs	Dato' Seri Mohamed Azmin Ali MP	PKR	Gombak	21 May 2018	24 February 2020
Minister of Defence	Mohamad Sabu MP	AMANAH	Kota Raja	21 May 2018	24 February 2020
Minister of Home Affairs	Tan Sri Dato' Haji Muhyiddin Mohd. Yassin MP	BERSATU	Pagoh	21 May 2018	24 February 2020
Minister of International Trade and Industry	Datuk Ignatius Darell Leiking MP	WARISAN	Penampang	2 July 2018	24 February 2020
Minister of Education	Dr. Maszlee Malik MP	BERSATU	Simpang Renggam	21 May 2018	3 January 2020
Minister of Education	Tun Dr. Mahathir Mohamad MP (Acting)	BERSATU	Langkawi	3 January 2020	24 February 2020
Minister of Water, Land and Natural Resources	Dato' Dr. Xavier Jayakumar Arulanandam MP	PKR	Kuala Langat	2 July 2018	24 February 2020
Minister of Federal Territories	Khalid Abdul Samad MP	AMANAH	Shah Alam	2 July 2018	24 February 2020
Minister of Transport	Anthony Loke Siew Fook MP	DAP	Seremban	21 May 2018	24 February 2020
Minister of Agriculture and Agro-based Industry	Datuk Seri Salahuddin Ayub MP	AMANAH	Pulai	21 May 2018	24 February 2020
Minister of Health	Datuk Seri Dr. Dzulkefly Ahmad MP	AMANAH	Kuala Selangor	21 May 2018	24 February 2020
Minister of Tourism, Arts and Culture	Datuk Mohammadin Ketapi MP	WARISAN	Silam	2 July 2018	24 February 2020
Minister of Housing and Local Government	Zuraida Kamaruddin MP	PKR	Ampang	21 May 2018	24 February 2020
Minister of Foreign Affairs	Dato' Saifuddin Abdullah MP	PKR	Indera Mahkota	2 July 2018	24 February 2020
Minister of Human Resources	Kulasegaran Murugeson MP	DAP	Ipoh Barat	21 May 2018	24 February 2020
Minister of Domestic Trade and Consumers Affairs	Datuk Seri Saifuddin Nasution Ismail MP	PKR	Kulim-Bandar Baharu	2 July 2018	24 February 2020
Minister of Entrepreneurship Development and Co-operatives	Datuk Seri Mohd. Redzuan Md. Yusof MP	BERSATU	Alor Gajah	2 July 2018	24 February 2020
Minister of Rural Development	Datuk Seri Rina Mohd Harun MP	BERSATU	Titiwangsa	21 May 2018	24 February 2020
Minister of Works	Baru Bian MP	PKR	Selangau	2 July 2018	24 February 2020
Minister of Energy, Science, Technology, Environment and Climate Change	Yeo Bee Yin MP	DAP	Bakri	2 July 2018	24 February 2020
Minister of Primary Industries	Teresa Kok Suh Sim MP	DAP	Seputeh	2 July 2018	24 February 2020
Minister of Women, Family and Community Development	Dato' Seri Dr. Wan Azizah Wan Ismail MP	PKR	Pandan	21 May 2018	24 February 2020
Minister of Youth and Sports	Syed Saddiq Syed Abdul Rahman MP	BERSATU	Muar	2 July 2018	24 February 2020
Minister of Communication and Multimedia	Gobind Singh Deo MP	DAP	Puchong	21 May 2018	24 February 2020

=== Deputy ministers ===
PKR (7) DAP (7) BERSATU (6) AMANAH (5) WARISAN (2)

Portfolio	Office bearer	Party	Constituency	Term start	Term end
Deputy Ministers in the Prime Minister's Department	Fuziah Salleh MP (Religious Affairs)	PKR	Kuantan	2 July 2018	24 February 2020
Deputy Ministers in the Prime Minister's Department	Mohamed Hanipa Maidin MP (Law)	AMANAH	Sepang	2 July 2018	24 February 2020
Deputy Ministers in the Prime Minister's Department	Datuk Wira Dr. Mohamed Farid Md Rafik MP (National Unity and Social Wellbeing)	BERSATU	Tanjung Piai	2 July 2018	21 September 2019
Deputy Minister of Finance	Dato' Wira Ir. Haji Amiruddin Hamzah MP	BERSATU	Kubang Pasu	2 July 2018	24 February 2020
Deputy Minister of Economic Affairs	Senator Dr. Mohd Radzi Md Jidin	BERSATU	Senator	17 July 2018	24 February 2020
Deputy Minister of Defence	Senator Liew Chin Tong	DAP	Senator	17 July 2018	24 February 2020
Deputy Minister of Home Affairs	Datuk Mohd. Azis Jamman MP	WARISAN	Sepanggar	2 July 2018	24 February 2020
Deputy Minister of International Trade and Industry	Dr. Ong Kian Ming MP	DAP	Bangi	2 July 2018	24 February 2020
Deputy Minister of Education	Teo Nie Ching MP	DAP	Kulai	2 July 2018	24 February 2020
Deputy Minister of Water, Land and Natural Resources	Tengku Zulpuri Shah Raja Puji MP	DAP	Raub	2 July 2018	24 February 2020
Deputy Minister of Federal Territories	Datuk Dr. Shahruddin Md. Salleh MP	BERSATU	Sri Gading	2 July 2018	24 February 2020
Deputy Minister of Transport	Dato' Kamarudin Jaffar MP	PKR	Bandar Tun Razak	2 July 2018	24 February 2020
Deputy Minister of Agriculture and Agro-based Industry	Sim Tze Tzin MP	PKR	Bayan Baru	2 July 2018	24 February 2020
Deputy Minister of Health	Dr. Lee Boon Chye MP	PKR	Gopeng	2 July 2018	24 February 2020
Deputy Minister of Tourism, Arts and Culture	Muhammad Bakhtiar Wan Chik MP	PKR	Balik Pulau	2 July 2018	24 February 2020
Deputy Minister of Housing and Local Government	Senator Dato' Raja Kamarul Bahrin Shah Raja Ahmad	AMANAH	Senator	17 July 2018	24 February 2020
Deputy Minister of Foreign Affairs	Senator Datuk Wira Marzuki Yahya	BERSATU	Senator	17 July 2018	24 February 2020
Deputy Minister of Human Resources	Dato' Wira Mahfuz Omar MP	AMANAH	Pokok Sena	2 July 2018	24 February 2020
Deputy Minister of Domestic Trade and Consumer Affairs	Chong Chieng Jen MP	DAP	Stampin	2 July 2018	24 February 2020
Deputy Minister of Entrepreneurship Development	Datuk Wira Dr. Mohd Hatta Md Ramli MP	AMANAH	Lumut	2 July 2018	24 February 2020
Deputy Minister of Rural Development	Sivarasa Rasiah MP	PKR	Sungai Buloh	2 July 2018	24 February 2020
Deputy Minister of Works	Datuk Wira Mohd Anuar Mohd Tahir MP	AMANAH	Temerloh	2 July 2018	24 February 2020
Deputy Minister of Energy, Science, Technology, Environment and Climate Change	Isnaraissah Munirah Majilis MP	WARISAN	Kota Belud	2 July 2018	24 February 2020
Deputy Minister of Primary Industries	Datuk Seri Shamsul Iskandar Mohd Akin MP	PKR	Hang Tuah Jaya	2 July 2018	24 February 2020
Deputy Minister of Women, Family and Community Development	Hannah Yeoh Tseow Suan MP	DAP	Segambut	2 July 2018	24 February 2020
Deputy Minister of Youth and Sports	Steven Sim Chee Keong MP	DAP	Bukit Mertajam	2 July 2018	24 February 2020
Deputy Minister of Communication and Multimedia	Dato' Eddin Syazlee Shith MP	BERSATU	Kuala Pilah	2 July 2018	24 February 2020

=== Council of Eminent Persons ===
In addition to the cabinet, Mahathir established a five-member advisory team called "Council of Eminent Persons" or "Council of Elders" (Malay: Majlis Penasihat Kerajaan, literally Government Advisory Council), led by Daim Zainuddin as the council chairman. The purpose of this council was to advise the government on matters pertaining to economic and financial matters during the transition of power period. Daim declared the council, which held its final meeting on 17 August 2018, had ended its 100-day term, as it had fulfilled the mandate given to it within the specified period.

Members	Previous position
Tun Dr. Daim Zainuddin - Chairman	Former Malaysian finance minister
Tan Sri Dr. Zeti Akhtar Aziz	Former Bank Negara Malaysia governor
Professor Dr. Jomo Kwame Sundaram	Prominent Malaysian economist
Tan Sri Robert Kuok Hok Nien	Hong Kong-based Malaysian tycoon
Tan Sri Hassan Marican	Former CEO of Petronas

== Changes ==
Under this cabinet:

- A new Ministry of Economic Affairs was established as a result of separation of economic affairs portfolio from the Prime Minister's Department.
- Ministry of Domestic Trade, Co-operatives and Consumerism was reinstated to its old name, Ministry of Domestic Trade and Consumer Affairs.
- Ministry of Energy, Green Technology and Water, Ministry of Natural Resources and Environment, Ministry of Science, Technology and Innovation formed in the previous Cabinet, were merged into two new ministries, namely Ministry of Energy, Science, Technology, Environment and Climate Change and Ministry of Water, Land and Natural Resources.
- Ministry of Entrepreneur Development was reinstated as a result of transfer of such function from the Ministry of International Trade and Industry and the then-Ministry of Domestic Affairs, Co-operatives and Consumerism.
- Ministries of Education and Higher Education were merged. A single Ministry of Education is reinstated.
- Ministry of Plantation Industries and Commodities was renamed as Ministry of Primary Industries.
- Ministry of Rural and Regional Development was reinstated to its old name, Ministry of Rural Development.
- Ministry of Tourism and Culture was renamed as Ministry of Tourism, Art and Culture.
