= Human Resources Development Fund =

Human Resources Development Fund officially renamed Human Resources Development Corporation (HRD CORP)
- Kumpulan Wang Pembangunan Sumber Manusia

Statutory Body overview
- Formed: 1 June 2001; 25 years ago
- Jurisdiction: Government of Malaysia
- Headquarters: Wisma HRDF, Jalan Beringin, Damansara Heights, 50490 Kuala Lumpur, Federal Territory of Kuala Lumpur, Malaysia
- Employees: 325
- Minister responsible: V. Sivakumar, Minister of Human Resources
- Deputy Minister responsible: Mustapha Sakmud, Deputy Minister of Human Resources
- Statutory Body executive: Elanjelian Venugopal, Chief Executive
- Parent Statutory Body: Ministry of Human Resources
- Website: hrdcorp.gov.my

Human Resources Development Fund (Malay: Kumpulan Wang Pembangunan Sumber Manusia) commonly known by the acronym HRDF is a Malaysian Statutory Body under the Ministry of Human Resources. Renamed at June 21, 2021 as HRD CORP, under this corporation, accredited trainer are the key people who bring up the skills of corporate by provide various types of effective training.

HRDC is governed by the Human Resources Development Act 1992 (currently known as Pembangunan Sumber Manusia Berhad Act 2001(PSMB)).
