= Steven Sim Chee Keong =

Malaysian politician

Yang Berhormat Tuan Steven Sim Chee Keong MP
- 沈志强
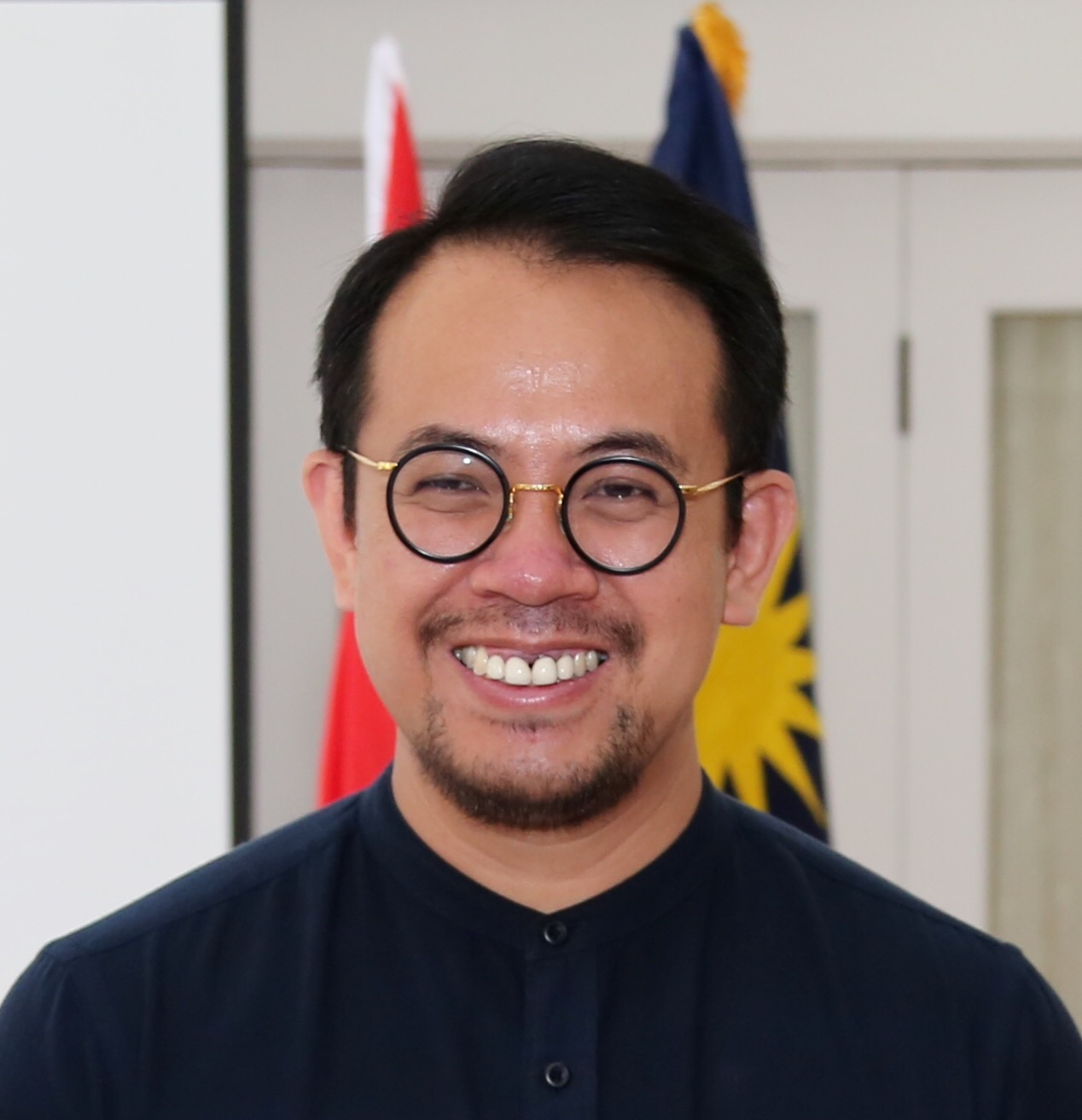

Minister of Entrepreneur and Cooperatives Development
- Incumbent
- Assumed office 17 December 2025
- Monarch: Ibrahim Iskandar
- Prime Minister: Anwar Ibrahim
- Deputy: Mohamad Alamin
- Preceded by: Ewon Benedick
- Constituency: Bukit Mertajam

Minister of Human Resources
- In office 12 December 2023 – 17 December 2025
- Monarchs: Abdullah (2022–2024); Ibrahim Iskandar (2024–2025)
- Prime Minister: Anwar Ibrahim
- Deputy: Abdul Rahman Mohamad
- Preceded by: Sivakumar Varatharaju
- Succeeded by: Ramanan Ramakrishnan
- Constituency: Bukit Mertajam

Deputy Minister of Finance II
- In office 10 December 2022 – 12 December 2023 Serving with Ahmad Maslan (Deputy Minister of Finance I)
- Monarch: Abdullah
- Prime Minister: Anwar Ibrahim
- Minister: Anwar Ibrahim
- Preceded by: Yamani Hafez Musa
- Succeeded by: Lim Hui Ying (Deputy Minister of Finance)
- Constituency: Bukit Mertajam

Deputy Minister of Youth and Sports
- In office 2 July 2018 – 24 February 2020
- Monarchs: Muhammad V (2018–2019); Abdullah (2019–2020)
- Prime Minister: Mahathir Mohamad
- Minister: Syed Saddiq Syed Abdul Rahman
- Preceded by: Saravanan Murugan
- Succeeded by: Wan Ahmad Fayhsal Wan Ahmad Kamal
- Constituency: Bukit Mertajam

Deputy Secretary-General of the Democratic Action Party
- Incumbent
- Assumed office 16 March 2025 Serving with Hannah Yeoh Tseow Suan & Ramkarpal Singh
- Secretary-General: Anthony Loke Siew Fook
- Preceded by: Liew Chin Tong

National Organising Secretary of the Democratic Action Party
- In office 20 March 2022 – 16 March 2025
- Assistant: Khoo Poay Tiong; Ng Suee Lim
- Secretary-General: Anthony Loke Siew Fook
- Preceded by: Anthony Loke Siew Fook
- Succeeded by: Khoo Poay Tiong

State Chairman of the Democratic Action Party of Penang
- Incumbent
- Assumed office 22 September 2024
- Deputy: Ramkarpal Singh
- Secretary-General: Anthony Loke Siew Fook
- Preceded by: Chow Kon Yeow

Member of the Malaysian Parliament for Bukit Mertajam
- Incumbent
- Assumed office 5 May 2013
- Preceded by: Chong Eng (PR–DAP)
- Majority: 43,063 (2013); 52,877 (2018); 57,685 (2022)

Personal details
- Born: Steven Sim Chee Keong; 13 May 1982 (age 44) Bukit Mertajam, Penang, Malaysia
- Citizenship: Malaysian
- Party: Democratic Action Party (DAP)
- Other political affiliations: Pakatan Rakyat (PR) (2008–2015); Pakatan Harapan (PH) (since 2015)
- Spouse: Chan Jo Rin
- Education: University of Malaya (BS); Sunway University (MSD)
- Occupation: Politician
- Website: stevensim.com

Steven Sim Chee Keong (Note: simplified Chinese: 沈志强; traditional Chinese: 沈志強; pinyin: Shěn Zhìqiáng; Pe̍h-ōe-jī: Sím Chì-kiông. In this Chinese name, the family name is Sim (沈). In accordance with custom, the Western-style name is Steven Sim and the Chinese-style name is Sim Chee Keong.) (born 13 May 1982) is a Malaysian politician who has served as the Minister of Entrepreneur and Cooperatives Development in the Unity Government administration under Prime Minister Anwar Ibrahim since December 2025 as well as the Member of Parliament (MP) for Bukit Mertajam since May 2013. He served as the Minister of Human Resources in the Unity Government administration under Prime Minister Anwar under Prime Minister and Minister Anwar from December 2023 to December 2025 and the Deputy Minister of Finance II in the PH administration from December 2022 to December 2023 and the Deputy Minister of Youth and Sports in the PH administration under former Prime Minister Mahathir Mohamad and former Minister Syed Saddiq from July 2018 to the collapse of the PH administration in February 2020. He is a member of the Democratic Action Party (DAP), a component party of the PH coalition. He has served as the Deputy Secretary-General of DAP since March 2025 and State Chairman of DAP of Penang since September 2024. He also served as the National Organising Secretary of DAP from March 2022 to March 2025. He is presently the fourth youngest Cabinet minister in the Anwar Ibrahim cabinet, after Minister of Youth and Sports Mohammed Taufiq Johari, Minister of Economy Akmal Nasir and Minister of Natural Resources and Environmental Sustainability Arthur Joseph Kurup at the age of 44 years, 166 days.

== Early life and education ==
Steven Sim Chee Keong was born in Bukit Mertajam, Penang, Malaysia on 13 May 1982. His early education started at SK Stowell and Bukit Mertajam High School (HSBM). He graduated from University of Malaya in Computer Science in 2004. He later pursued a Masters in Sustainable Development at the Jeffrey Sachs Centre on Sustainable Development in Sunway University and graduated in 2020.

== Early career ==
Steven served in a multinational corporation for three years before joining the Penang state government in 2008. He also sits on the governing board of the Penang Institute, a leading public policy think tank based in Penang, Malaysia.

Steven was formerly the executive secretary of the Network of Social Democracy in Asia, a regional dialogue of political parties, scholars and NGOs of the social democratic persuasion.

== Political career ==
=== Early political career ===
In January 2011, Steven was appointed as a member of the Seberang Perai Municipal Council (MPSP), one of the largest local governments of Malaysia.

In 2012, he was named as a Young Global Leader of the Geneva-based World Economic Forum. He is also a member of the Board of Directors of Penang Institute, a public policy think-tank based in Penang.

Steven writes regularly for Penang Monthly (formerly Penang Economic Monthly) as well as contributing opinion pieces to prominent Malaysian online news portals such as Malaysiakini and the Malaysian Insider. He has authored 4 books, including "A contemporary socio-political critique of the Malay classic Hikayat Hang Tuah, Hang Tuah: Adiwira Bangsa" in 2021.

Steven was elected into the DAP central executive committee (CEC) in 2022.

=== Minister of Human Resources (since 2023) ===
In a cabinet reshuffle on 12 December 2023, Steven was promoted to a Cabinet minister and assigned a new portfolio. He was appointed as the Minister of Human Resources to replace V. Sivakumar, who was the only Cabinet minister to be dropped in the reshuffle and whose aides were facing corruption charges.

=== State Chairman of DAP Penang (since 2024) ===
In the 2024 DAP Penang state party elections, Steven was appointed as the Penang DAP chairman for the 2024 - 2027 term.

== Personal life ==
Steven is married to Chan Jo Rin.

He speaks English, Malay, Hokkien, and Mandarin.

== Election results ==
Parliament of Malaysia
Year	Constituency	Candidate	Votes	Pct	Opponent(s)	Votes	Pct	Ballots cast	Majority	Turnout
2013	P045 Bukit Mertajam	Steven Sim Chee Keong (DAP)	55,877	80.29%	Gui Guat Lye (MCA)	12,814	18.41%	69,588	43,063	88.09%
2018	P045 Bukit Mertajam	Steven Sim Chee Keong (DAP)	63,784	85.40%	Gui Guat Lye (MCA)	10,907	14.60%	75,977	52,877	85.37%
2022	P045 Bukit Mertajam	Steven Sim Chee Keong (DAP)	71,722	77.33%	Steven Koh Tien Yew (PAS)	14,037	15.14%	93,695	57,685	77.34%
2022	P045 Bukit Mertajam	Steven Sim Chee Keong (DAP)	71,722	77.33%	Tan Yang Pang (MCA)	6,986	7.53%	93,695	57,685	77.34%

== Honours ==
=== Honours of Malaysia ===
- Malaysia
  - Recipient of the 17th Yang di-Pertuan Agong Installation Medal (2024)
- Selangor
  - Recipient of the Sultan Sharafuddin Silver Jubilee Medal (2026)

=== Award ===
- Young Global Leader (2012)

== Bibliography ==
=== Books ===
- The Audacity to Think: An Invitation to Rethink Politics (2012)
- Being Malaysia (2018)
- An anthology of Malay poems, Dalam Salju Ada Bunga (2018)
- A contemporary socio-political critique of the Malay classic Hikayat Hang Tuah, Hang Tuah: Adiwira Bangsa (2021).
