= M. Kulasegaran =

Malaysian politician and barrister

Yang Berhormat Tuan M. Kulasegaran MP
- மு.குலசேகரன்
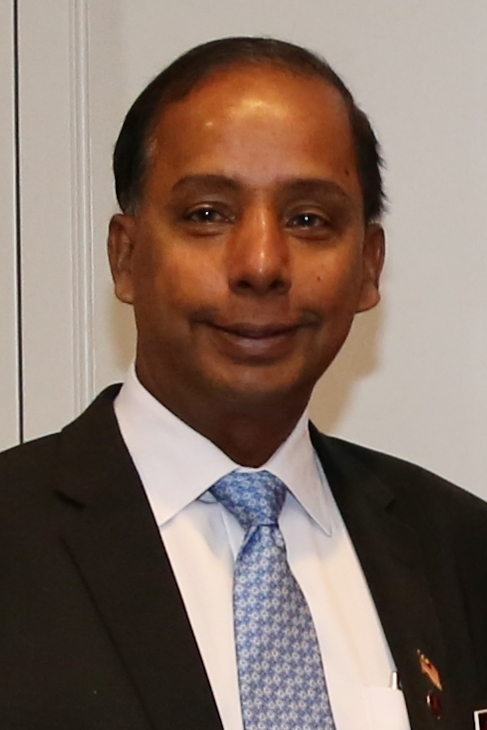

Deputy Minister in the Prime Minister's Department (Law and Institutional Reforms)
- Incumbent
- Assumed office 12 December 2023
- Monarchs: Abdullah (2023–2024); Ibrahim Iskandar (since 2024)
- Prime Minister: Anwar Ibrahim
- Minister: Azalina Othman Said
- Preceded by: Ramkarpal Singh
- Constituency: Ipoh Barat

Minister of Human Resources
- In office 21 May 2018 – 24 February 2020
- Monarchs: Muhammad V (2018–2019); Abdullah (2019–2020)
- Prime Minister: Mahathir Mohamad
- Deputy: Mahfuz Omar
- Preceded by: Richard Riot Jaem
- Succeeded by: Saravanan Murugan
- Constituency: Ipoh Barat

Member of the Malaysian Parliament for Ipoh Barat
- Incumbent
- Assumed office 21 March 2004
- Preceded by: Ho Cheong Sing (BN–MCA)
- Majority: 598 (2004); 15,534 (2008); 29,038 (2013); 45,724 (2018); 56,667 (2022)

Member of the Malaysian Parliament for Telok Intan
- In office 17 May 1997 – 29 November 1999
- Preceded by: Ong Tin Kim (BN–GERAKAN)
- Succeeded by: Mah Siew Keong (BN–GERAKAN)
- Majority: 2,916 (1997)

Personal details
- Born: M. Kula Segaran s/o V. Murugeson; 10 August 1957 (age 68) Sitiawan, Perak, Federation of Malaya (now Malaysia)
- Citizenship: Malaysian
- Party: Democratic Action Party (DAP)
- Other political affiliations: Barisan Alternatif (BA) (1999–2004); Pakatan Rakyat (PR) (2008–2015); Pakatan Harapan (PH) (since 2015)
- Spouse: Kodi Krishnan (m. 1986; div. 1997) Jayalachimi Kanapathy (m. 1999)
- Children: 2
- Occupation: Politician
- Profession: Barrister
- Website: ipohbaratvoice.blogspot.com
- M. Kulasegaran on Facebook; M. Kulasegaran on Parliament of Malaysia

M. Kula Segaran s/o V. Murugeson (Tamil: மு. குலசேகரன், romanized: Mu. Kulacēkaraṉ; born 10 August 1957), commonly known as Kula, is a Malaysian politician and lawyer. He has served as Deputy Minister in the Prime Minister's Department in charge of Laws and Institutional Reforms in the Unity Government under Prime Minister Anwar Ibrahim and Minister Azalina Othman Said since December 2023. He has represented Ipoh Barat in the Dewan Rakyat since 2004.

Kula previously served as Minister of Human Resources in the Pakatan Harapan (PH) administration under Prime Minister Mahathir Mohamad from 2018 to 2020, and as the Member of Parliament (MP) for Teluk Intan from 1997 to 1999. He was formerly the National Vice-chairman of the Democratic Action Party (DAP), a component of the PH coalition and formerly of Pakatan Rakyat (PR) and Barisan Alternatif (BA).

His appointment as deputy minister in 2023 was notable, as few former cabinet ministers have returned to serve in subordinate roles; he was among three such appointees alongside Shamsul Anuar Nasarah and Noraini Ahmad. In February 2025, Kula announced that he would not contest in the DAP’s internal elections, saying he wished to support leadership renewal and make way for younger members.

== Early life and education ==
M. Kula Segaran was born on 10 August 1957 in Lumut, Perak, the eighth of nine children in a family of rubber tappers, Murugeson Veerasamy and Visalachee. He grew up on an estate in Sitiawan, where he helped his father with newspaper vending and livestock rearing.

He attended the Anglo-Chinese School in Lumut for his primary education and later the Anglo-Chinese School, Sitiawan, where he obtained the Malaysian Certificate of Education. He completed Sixth Form at the Methodist English School, Sitiawan, in 1977.

Encouraged by a family friend, V. V. V. Menon, his father sold two acres of land to fund his legal studies in the United Kingdom. He studied at Ealing College and later at Lincoln’s Inn, London, where he was called to the Bar of England and Wales in July 1982. He returned to Malaysia and was admitted as an advocate and solicitor of the High Court of Malaya the following year.

During his flight to the UK, Kula read Lim Kit Siang’s Time Bombs in Malaysia, which he later said inspired his decision to return home after graduation “to change things.”

== Legal career ==
After chambering with Willie Concison in Ipoh, Kula founded the firm Kula, Cheng & Co. in 1985, and later established Kula & Associates in 1989. His early work focused on civil litigation, labour disputes, and public interest cases.

He was one of the lawyers who visited opposition leader P. Patto during his detention under the Internal Security Act following Operasi Lalang in 1987, an experience that deepened his opposition to detention without trial.

In 2009, Kula took on the pro bono case of kindergarten teacher M. Indira Gandhi, whose ex-husband had converted their three children to Islam without her consent. The case culminated in a landmark 2018 Federal Court decision that nullified the unilateral conversions.

== Political career ==
=== Entry into politics ===
Kula joined the DAP in early 1990s after being introduced by P. Patto, a veteran DAP leader and Member of Parliament. Drawn to the party’s call for a “Malaysian Malaysia”, he became active in local politics in Perak. His decision to join the opposition disappointed his father, who was a long-time division chief in the MIC.

His foray into electoral politics came when he contested the Canning Garden state constituency in the 1995 general election but lost narrowly to the Barisan Nasional (BN) candidate. In the 1999 general election, he stood for the Buntong state seat but was again unsuccessful.

=== Member of Parliament ===
The death of the Gerakan MP for Teluk Intan, Ong Tin Kin, in early 1997 triggered a by-election. Representing the DAP, Kula contested and won the seat by a majority of 2,916 votes, overturning BN’s earlier 13,968-vote margin. It was his first election victory and entry into Parliament.

He later moved to contest the Ipoh Barat parliamentary seat in the 1999 general election, but lost. He regained a seat in Parliament in 2004, when he won Ipoh Barat in a rematch with Ho Cheong Sing, beginning an unbroken tenure as its MP to date. He has successfully defended the seat in 2008, 2013, 2018 and 2022, with increasing majorities in each election.

==== Parliamentarians for Global Action (PGA) ====
In 2018, Kula was appointed chairman of the Malaysian chapter of PGA and later served on its executive board.

A long-time advocate of international justice and disarmament, Kula was active in PGA campaigns well before his chairmanship. As early as 2012, he persuaded more than 70 members of the Parliament of Asia to sign the Global Parliamentary Declaration on the Arms Trade Treaty and continued to urge Malaysia to ratify the treaty in subsequent years. He also pressed for Malaysia’s accession to the Rome Statute of the International Criminal Court and the abolition of the mandatory death penalty.

During his tenure, Malaysia’s Cabinet decided in December 2018 to accede to the Rome Statute of the International Criminal Court and formally deposited the instrument of accession on 4 March 2019. However, the government withdrew from the treaty a month later following domestic political controversy and opposition from several quarters.

In 2023, Kula was reappointed chairman of the Malaysian chapter of PGA.

==== Advocacy on minority rights ====
Although his early political focus was on governance and labour issues, he increasingly spoke out on minority rights issues, particularly concerning the Indian Malaysian community.

In 1999, he joined forces with a host of Indian Malaysian NGOs and opposed government legislation to abolish the South Indian Labour Fund, established in 1908, and transfer its assets to the state. In 2007, he criticised the demolition of Hindu temples and stated that Indians were being “treated like third-class citizens.” He later participated in the 2007 Hindu Rights Action Force (HINDRAF) rally, which he described as a turning point that shifted political support within the Indian community away from the ruling coalition.

Kula also represented M. Indira Gandhi in a landmark nine-year legal battle that resulted in the Federal Court’s 2018 ruling nullifying the unilateral conversion of her three children to Islam. He characterised the case as part of a broader resistance to what he called “creeping Islamisation” of Malaysian law.

=== Minister of Human Resources ===
After the PH coalition won the 2018 general election and formed the federal government, Prime Minister Mahathir Mohamad appointed Kula as Minister of Human Resources in May 2018. He attracted attention on social media for wearing a turban during the swearing-in ceremony.

Upon taking office, Kula initiated reforms of the Human Resources Development Fund (HRDF) to address allegations of financial misappropriation and weak governance. He established an independent five-member Governance Oversight Committee (GOC) chaired by former International Trade and Industry secretary-general Tan Sri Rebecca Sta Maria, and commissioned the fund’s first independent forensic audit.

Following the GOC’s preliminary findings, Kula disclosed serious irregularities, including alleged misappropriation of between RM100 million and RM300 million and unauthorised property purchases. He also discontinued, effective 15 November 2018, a controversial 30% levy deduction from employer contributions that had been diverted into a consolidated fund. The reforms, informed by the GOC’s final report, led to a restructuring of the fund and recommendations to strengthen the PSMB Act 2001 to enhance transparency and accountability.

As minister, Kula convened the National Labour Advisory Council (NLAC) ten times in 2019 — the first minister to do so in a single year. Established in 2002, the NLAC is Malaysia’s tripartite consultative body bringing together the government, the Malaysian Trades Union Congress and the Malaysian Employers Federation to advise on labour policies and international labour standards. These consultations paved the way for several key labour law reforms, including the Industrial Relations (Amendment) Act 2020 (Act A1615), the Employees’ Social Security (Amendment) Act 2022 (Act A1658), and the Employment (Amendment) Act 2022, which came into effect on 1 January 2023.

Kula also drew international attention for declaring a “war on human trafficking” in Malaysia, acknowledging that the country remained significantly affected by the problem. He held town hall sessions with employers, urging greater accountability through Social Compliance Audit reports. Kula stated his goal of moving Malaysia off the U.S. State Department’s Tier 2 Watchlist in its Trafficking in Persons Report, working closely with stakeholders to strengthen legal protections and social safeguards.

He also championed the rights of the Orang Asli community, facilitating their access to technical and vocational training through institutes under the Ministry of Human Resources. In 2020, 17 Orang Asli students enrolled in the Industrial Training Institute, Ipoh, following seven who had done so in 2019 at his encouragement. Kula also prioritised strengthening Malaysia’s TVET system to prepare the workforce for emerging technologies and future industries.

=== Deputy Minister in the Prime Minister's Department (since 2023) ===
In a cabinet reshuffle on 12 December 2023, Kula made a comeback to the government as the Deputy Minister in the Prime Minister's Department in charge of Parliament and Institutional Reforms, deputising for Minister Azalina. His appointment to the position was seen as a demotion, as he was previously a Cabinet minister. On 23 January 2024, Kula revealed that preparation work on a Bill on the separation of powers between the Attorney-General and the Public Prosecutor was in its final phase, and it would likely be tabled by the end of 2024 after holding discussions with stakeholders and comparing it with those in Australia and Kenya. On 3 February 2024, Kula called for a comprehensive and transparent inquiry to investigate how 131 undocumented immigrants escaped the Bidor Immigration Depot, and the implementation of necessary measures to prevent it from happening again. In addition, he urged for an independent task force of eminent persons or a parliamentary select committee to be set up to carry out a probe. He also acknowledged the swift response of the law enforcement agencies stationed at the depot to keep their fellow officers safe during the escape. He also added that the process must be unbiased to instil confidence in the public and the integrity of the process must be upheld by making the investigation report public.

As Deputy Minister, Kula also championed significant reform of the Legal Profession Qualifying Board (LPQB). In November 2024, he revealed to the Dewan Rakyat that the board had not been audited for 17 years (since 2007) and announced plans to amend the Legal Profession Act 1976 to make annual audits by the Auditor-General mandatory.

In July 2025, a task force was formed to study a new Common Bar Course (CBC) to replace the existing Certificate in Legal Practice (CLP) examination. On 1 August 2025, the Cabinet agreed in principle to transform the LPQB into a body corporate to enhance accountability, requiring it to table an annual report in Parliament.

The push for reform intensified after the Federal Court’s 7 October 2025 ruling that the LPQB had acted beyond its powers by abolishing the articled clerkship programme, and following Kula's demands for an explanation for the board’s RM500,000-plus UK trip. In response, the Cabinet, which had already agreed in principle on 1 August 2025 to restructure the LPQB, publicly confirmed the reforms on 9 October 2025.

In addition, Kula has been actively championing the establishment of a Human Rights Tribunal, calling it a “significant step in institutional reform.” After chairing an initial meeting on the proposal on 21 November 2024, he announced the formation of the Feasibility Study Committee on the Human Rights Tribunal (JKKTHAM) in June 2025. In July 2025, he informed the Dewan Rakyat that the committee—comprising representatives from the judiciary, the Bar Council, Suhakam, and various NGOs—had met five times, and that its report was expected to be finalised by October 2025. Kula suggested that the proposed tribunal could serve as an accessible mechanism for victims seeking justice and might be empowered to review past high-profile cases, such as the death of Teoh Beng Hock.

== Controversy ==
In 2007, Kula was suspended from Parliament for four days for disobeying the Deputy Speaker, and in 2008 he was called a "bastard" and a "bloody bastard" by a government politician whom he accused of being "hated" by Indian constituents.

In July 2018, while delivering a speech at an event in Nilai, Kula referenced archaeological discoveries in the Bujang Valley to highlight the 2,500-year history of the Indians in the Malay Peninsula, arguing that the Indian community should not consider itself "pendatang" (immigrants). Public controversy erupted when Utusan Malaysia published a report claiming he had asserted that Malays were immigrants, while Indians the natives. Kula strongly denied the report, stating his remarks had been deliberately taken out of context to provoke racial tension. Nevertheless, to prevent the controversy from escalating further, Kula issued an open apology and retracted the off-the-cuff remarks, noting that the nuance of his words may have been lost in translation while reaffirming his adherence to the Federal Constitution.

Less than a year later during 2019 Rantau by-election, he was criticised for his speech urging Indian voters to vote for the Pakatan Harapan candidate Dr. Streram Sinnasamy due to him being from their community. He also claimed that the Indian community would never approach non-Indian ministers to resolve their problems and admitted his preference to eat at Indian restaurants when he visited Rantau.

== Personal life ==
Kula married Kodi Krishnan in 1986, and they have a son, Arun Segaran, born in 1987. The marriage ended in 1997. He later married Jayalatchimi Kanapathy, with whom he has a daughter, Tanisha, born in 2006.

He has spoken about his upbringing on a rubber estate in Sitiawan, describing it as an experience that instilled in him a strong belief in education, social mobility, and self-reliance.

== Electoral history ==
Parliament of Malaysia
Year	Constituency	Candidate	Votes	Pct	Opponent(s)	Votes	Pct	Ballots cast	Majority	Turnout
1997	P073 Telok Intan	M. Kulasegaran (DAP)	15,007	55.38%	Chee See Choke (Gerakan)	12,091	44.62%	27,639	2,916	53.67%
1999	P062 Ipoh Barat	M. Kulasegaran (DAP)	21,477	45.84%	Ho Cheong Sing (MCA)	25,155	53.70%	48,696	3,678	68.24%
1999	P062 Ipoh Barat	M. Kulasegaran (DAP)	21,477	45.84%	Jaga N. Nathan (MDP)	215	0.46%	48,696	3,678	68.24%
2004	P065 Ipoh Barat	M. Kulasegaran (DAP)	22,935	50.66%	Ho Cheong Sing (MCA)	22,337	49.34%	46,768	598	68.38%
2008	P065 Ipoh Barat	M. Kulasegaran (DAP)	32,576	65.65%	Yik Phooi Hong (MCA)	17,042	34.35%	50,641	15,534	72.58%
2013	P065 Ipoh Barat	M. Kulasegaran (DAP)	45,420	73.21%	Cheng Wei Yee (MCA)	16,382	26.41%	63,074	29,038	81.11%
2013	P065 Ipoh Barat	M. Kulasegaran (DAP)	45,420	73.21%	Kalwant Singh Sujan Singh (IND)	235	0.38%	63,074	29,038	81.11%
2018	P065 Ipoh Barat	M. Kulasegaran (DAP)	55,613	83.78%	Cheng Wei Yee (MCA)	9,889	16.22%	66,380	45,724	78.21%
2022	P065 Ipoh Barat	M. Kulasegaran (DAP)	63,915	81.57%	Low Guo Nan (MCA)	7,248	9.25%	79,312	56,667	69.20%
2022	P065 Ipoh Barat	M. Kulasegaran (DAP)	63,915	81.57%	Chek Kwong Weng (Gerakan)	6,815	8.70%	79,312	56,667	69.20%
2022	P065 Ipoh Barat	M. Kulasegaran (DAP)	63,915	81.57%	M. Kayveas (IND)	378	0.48%	79,312	56,667	69.20%

Perak State Legislative Assembly
Year	Constituency	Candidate	Votes	Pct	Opponent(s)	Votes	Pct	Ballots cast	Majority	Turnout
1995	N22 Taman Canning	M. Kulasegaran (DAP)	8,005	41.47%	Hiew Yew Can (MCA)	10,718	55.52%	19,305	2,713	69.51%
1999	N26 Buntong	M. Kulasegaran (DAP)	8,974	39.76%	Yik Phooi Hong (MCA)	13,001	57.60%	22,573	4,027	66.41%

== Honours and recognition ==
- Malaysia
  - Recipient of the 17th Yang di-Pertuan Agong Installation Medal
