= Third Abdullah cabinet =

Malaysian cabinet (2008–09)

- 17th Cabinet of Malaysia

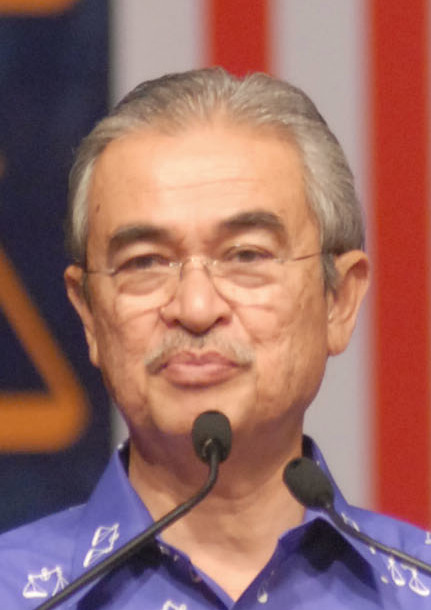
- Date established: 19 March 2008
- Date dissolved: 10 April 2009

Leadership and composition
- Head of state: Tuanku Mizan Zainal Abidin
- Head of government: Abdullah Ahmad Badawi
- Deputy: Najib Razak
- No. of ministers: 32 ministers and 38 deputy ministers
- Member parties: Barisan Nasional: United Malays National Organisation; Malaysian Chinese Association; Parti Pesaka Bumiputera Bersatu; Malaysian Indian Congress; Parti Gerakan Rakyat Malaysia; United Sabah Party; Sarawak United Peoples' Party; United Pasokmomogun Kadazandusun Murut Organisation; Liberal Democratic Party; Sabah Progressive Party; Sarawak Progressive Democratic Party; Sarawak People's Party; United Sabah People's Party; People's Progressive Party
- Status in legislature: Coalition government
- Opposition parties: People's Justice Party; Democratic Action Party; Pan-Malaysian Islamic Party
- Opposition leaders: Wan Azizah Wan Ismail (2008); Anwar Ibrahim (2008–2009)
- Budget: 2009

Formation and history
- Election: 2008 Malaysian general election
- Legislature term: 12th Malaysian Parliament
- Predecessor: Second Abdullah cabinet
- Successor: First Najib cabinet

Abdullah Ahmad Badawi formed the third Abdullah cabinet after being invited by Tuanku Mizan Zainal Abidin to begin a new government following the 8 March 2008 general election in Malaysia. It was the 17th cabinet of Malaysia formed since independence. Prior to the election, Abdullah led (as Prime Minister) the second Abdullah cabinet, a coalition government that consisted of members of the component parties of Barisan Nasional.

This is a list of the members of the third cabinet of the fifth Prime Minister of Malaysia, Abdullah Ahmad Badawi.

== Policies and key events ==
The third Abdullah cabinet operated during a period of significant political and economic instability. Following the 2008 general election, the government faced a reduced parliamentary majority, which led to a series of political challenges. The cabinet's term was marked by growing public discontent and a number of political defections, which threatened the stability of the ruling Barisan Nasional coalition.

Economically, the government had to navigate the global financial crisis of 2008. In response, it introduced a series of economic stimulus packages to stabilize the national economy and maintain public confidence. Ultimately, mounting pressure from within the ruling coalition led to Prime Minister Abdullah Ahmad Badawi's decision to resign, which brought an end to his cabinet's term less than a year after its formation.

== Composition ==
=== Full members ===
The federal cabinet consisted of the following ministers:

Portfolio	Office bearer	Party	Constituency	Term start	Term end
Prime Minister	Dato' Seri Abdullah Ahmad Badawi MP	UMNO	Kepala Batas	19 March 2008	9 April 2009
Deputy Prime Minister	Dato' Sri Mohd. Najib Abdul Razak MP	UMNO	Pekan	19 March 2008	9 April 2009
Minister in the Prime Minister's Department	Dato' Seri Mohamed Nazri Abdul Aziz MP	UMNO	Padang Rengas	19 March 2008	9 April 2009
Minister in the Prime Minister's Department	Dato' Seri Ahmad Zahid Hamidi MP	UMNO	Bagan Datok	19 March 2008	9 April 2009
Minister in the Prime Minister's Department	Tan Sri Amirsham Abdul Aziz	UMNO	Senator	19 March 2008	9 April 2009
Minister in the Prime Minister's Department	Datuk Zaid Ibrahim	UMNO	Senator	19 March 2008	17 September 2008
Minister in the Prime Minister's Department	Tan Sri Datuk Seri Panglima Bernard Giluk Dompok MP	UPKO	Penampang	19 March 2008	9 April 2009
Minister of Finance	Dato' Seri Abdullah Ahmad Badawi MP	UMNO	Kepala Batas	19 March 2008	23 September 2008
Minister of Finance	Tan Sri Nor Mohamed Yakcop MP	UMNO	Tasek Gelugor	19 March 2008	9 April 2009
Minister of Finance	Dato' Sri Mohd. Najib Abdul Razak MP	UMNO	Pekan	23 September 2008	9 April 2009
Minister of Defence	Dato' Sri Mohd. Najib Abdul Razak MP	UMNO	Pekan	19 March 2008	23 September 2008
Minister of Defence	Dato' Seri Abdullah Ahmad Badawi MP	UMNO	Kepala Batas	23 September 2008	9 April 2009
Minister of Home Affairs	Dato' Seri Syed Hamid Albar MP	UMNO	Kota Tinggi	19 March 2008	9 April 2009
Minister of International Trade and Industry	Tan Sri Dato' Haji Muhyiddin Mohd. Yassin MP	UMNO	Pagoh	19 March 2008	9 April 2009
Minister of Education	Dato' Seri Hishammuddin Hussein MP	UMNO	Sembrong	19 March 2008	9 April 2009
Minister of Natural Resources and Environment	Datuk Douglas Uggah Embas MP	PBB	Betong	19 March 2008	9 April 2009
Minister of Federal Territories	Dato' Sri Zulhasnan Rafique MP	UMNO	Setiawangsa	19 March 2008	9 April 2009
Minister of Transport	Dato' Sri Ong Tee Keat MP	MCA	Pandan	19 March 2008	9 April 2009
Minister of Agriculture and Agro-based Industry	Dato' Seri Mustapa Mohamed MP	UMNO	Jeli	19 March 2008	9 April 2009
Minister of Health	Dato' Sri Liow Tiong Lai MP	MCA	Bentong	19 March 2008	9 April 2009
Minister of Tourism	Dato' Sri Azalina Othman Said MP	UMNO	Pengerang	19 March 2008	9 April 2009
Minister of National Unity, Arts, Culture and Heritage	Dato' Seri Shafie Apdal MP	UMNO	Semporna	19 March 2008	9 April 2009
Minister of Housing and Local Government	Dato' Seri Ong Ka Chuan MP	MCA	Tanjong Malim	19 March 2008	9 April 2009
Minister of Foreign Affairs	Dato' Seri Utama Rais Yatim MP	UMNO	Jelebu	19 March 2008	9 April 2009
Minister of Higher Education	Dato' Seri Mohamed Khaled Nordin MP	UMNO	Pasir Gudang	19 March 2008	9 April 2009
Minister of Human Resources	Datuk Subramaniam Sathasivam MP	MIC	Segamat	19 March 2008	9 April 2009
Minister of Domestic Trade and Consumerism	Dato' Shahrir Abdul Samad MP	UMNO	Johor Bahru	19 March 2008	9 April 2009
Minister of Entrepreneur and Co-operatives Development	Dato' Noh Omar MP	UMNO	Tanjong Karang	19 March 2008	9 April 2009
Minister of Rural and Regional Development	Tan Sri Dato' Seri Muhammad Muhammad Taib MP	UMNO	Senator	19 March 2008	9 April 2009
Minister of Works	Dato' Sri Mohd Zin Mohamed MP	UMNO	Sepang	19 March 2008	9 April 2009
Minister of Science, Technology and Innovation	Datuk Maximus Johnity Ongkili MP	PBS	Kota Marudu	19 March 2008	9 April 2009
Minister of Energy, Water and Communications	Dato' Shaziman Abu Mansor MP	UMNO	Tampin	19 March 2008	9 April 2009
Minister for Plantation Industries and Commodities	Datuk Peter Chin Fah Kui MP	SUPP	Miri	19 March 2008	9 April 2009
Minister of Women, Family and Community Development	Dato' Sri Ng Yen Yen MP	MCA	Raub	19 March 2008	9 April 2009
Minister of Youth and Sports	Dato' Sri Ismail Sabri Yaakob MP	UMNO	Bera	19 March 2008	9 April 2009
Minister of Information	Dato' Ahmad Shabery Cheek MP	UMNO	Kemaman	19 March 2008	9 April 2009

=== Deputy ministers ===
Portfolio	Office bearer	Party	Constituency	Term start	Term end
Deputy Minister in the Prime Minister's Department	Dato' Hasan Malek MP	UMNO	Kuala Pilah	19 March 2008	9 April 2009
Deputy Minister in the Prime Minister's Department	Dato' Wira Mohd. Johari Baharum MP	UMNO	Kubang Pasu	19 March 2008	9 April 2009
Deputy Minister in the Prime Minister's Department	Dato' Mashitah Ibrahim	UMNO	Senator	19 March 2008	9 April 2009
Deputy Minister in the Prime Minister's Department	Devamany Krishnasamy MP	MIC	Cameron Highlands	19 March 2008	9 April 2009
Deputy Minister in the Prime Minister's Department	Dato' Murugiah Thopasamy	PPP	Senator	19 March 2008	9 April 2009
Deputy Minister of Finance	Dato' Ahmad Husni Hanadzlah MP	UMNO	Tambun	19 March 2008	9 April 2009
Deputy Minister of Finance	Dato' Kong Cho Ha MP	MCA	Lumut	19 March 2008	9 April 2009
Deputy Minister of Defence	Datuk Wira Abu Seman Yusop MP	UMNO	Masjid Tanah	19 March 2008	9 April 2009
Deputy Minister of Home Affairs	Dato' Wan Ahmad Farid Wan Salleh	UMNO	Senator	19 March 2008	9 April 2009
Deputy Minister of Home Affairs	Dato' Wira Chor Chee Heung MP	MCA	Alor Setar	19 March 2008	9 April 2009
Deputy Minister of International Trade and Industry	Datuk Liew Vui Keong MP	LDP	Sandakan	19 March 2008	9 April 2009
Deputy Minister of International Trade and Industry	Dato Jacob Dungau Sagan MP	SPDP	Baram	19 March 2008	9 April 2009
Deputy Minister of Education	Dato' Razali Ismail MP	UMNO	Kuala Terengganu	19 March 2008	17 January 2009
Deputy Minister of Education	Datuk Wee Ka Siong MP	MCA	Ayer Hitam	19 March 2008	9 April 2009
Deputy Minister of Natural Resources and Environment	Dato' Maznah Mazlan	UMNO	Senator	19 March 2008	9 April 2009
Deputy Minister of Federal Territories	Datuk Saravanan Murugan MP	MIC	Tapah	19 March 2008	9 April 2009
Deputy Minister of Transport	Datuk Seri Panglima Lajim Ukin MP	UMNO	Beaufort	19 March 2008	9 April 2009
Deputy Minister of Agriculture and Agro-based Industry	Datuk Rohani Abdul Karim MP	PBB	Batang Lupar	19 March 2008	9 April 2009
Deputy Minister of Health	Datuk Abdul Latiff Ahmad MP	UMNO	Mersing	19 March 2008	9 April 2009
Deputy Minister of Tourism	Dato Sri Sulaiman Abdul Rahman Taib MP	PBB	Kota Samarahan	19 March 2008	9 April 2009
Deputy Minister of National Unity, Arts, Culture and Heritage	Teng Boon Soon MP	MCA	Tebrau	19 March 2008	9 April 2009
Deputy Minister of Housing and Local Government	Dato' Hamzah Zainudin MP	UMNO	Larut	19 March 2008	9 April 2009
Deputy Minister of Housing and Local Government	Datuk Robert Lau Hoi Chew MP	SUPP	Sibu	19 March 2008	9 April 2009
Deputy Minister of Foreign Affairs	Datuk Abdul Rahim Bakri MP	UMNO	Kudat	19 March 2008	9 April 2009
Deputy Minister of Higher Education	Datuk Idris Haron MP	UMNO	Tangga Batu	19 March 2008	9 April 2009
Deputy Minister of Higher Education	Hou Kok Chung MP	MCA	Kluang	19 March 2008	9 April 2009
Deputy Minister of Human Resources	Dato' Noraini Ahmad MP	UMNO	Parit Sulong	19 March 2008	9 April 2009
Deputy Minister of Domestic Trade and Consumerism	Jelaing Mersat MP	SPDP	Saratok	19 March 2008	9 April 2009
Deputy Minister of Entrepreneur and Co-operatives Development	Dato' Saifuddin Abdullah MP	UMNO	Temerloh	19 March 2008	9 April 2009
Deputy Minister of Rural and Regional Development	Tan Sri Datuk Seri Panglima Joseph Kurup MP	PBRS	Pensiangan	19 March 2008	9 April 2009
Deputy Minister of Rural and Regional Development	Datuk Joseph Entulu Belaun MP	PRS	Selangau	19 March 2008	9 April 2009
Deputy Minister of Works	Dato' Yong Khoon Seng MP	SUPP	Stampin	19 March 2008	9 April 2009
Deputy Minister of Science, Technology and Innovation	Fadillah Yusof MP	PBB	Petra Jaya	19 March 2008	9 April 2009
Deputy Minister of Energy, Water and Communications	Dato' Joseph Salang Gandum MP	PRS	Julau	19 March 2008	9 April 2009
Deputy Minister of Plantation Industries and Commodities	A. Kohillan Pillay	Gerakan	Senator	19 March 2008	9 April 2009
Deputy Minister of Women, Family and Community Development	Noriah Kasnon MP	UMNO	Sungai Besar	19 March 2008	9 April 2009
Deputy Minister of Youth and Sports	Wee Jeck Seng MP	MCA	Tanjong Piai	19 March 2008	9 April 2009
Deputy Minister of Information	Dato' Tan Lian Hoe MP	Gerakan	Gerik	19 March 2008	9 April 2009

== See also ==
- Members of the Dewan Rakyat, 12th Malaysian Parliament
