= Saravanan Murugan =

Malaysian politician

Yang Berhormat Datuk Seri Saravanan Murugan SMW DMSM PMW AMN
- சரவணன் முருகன்
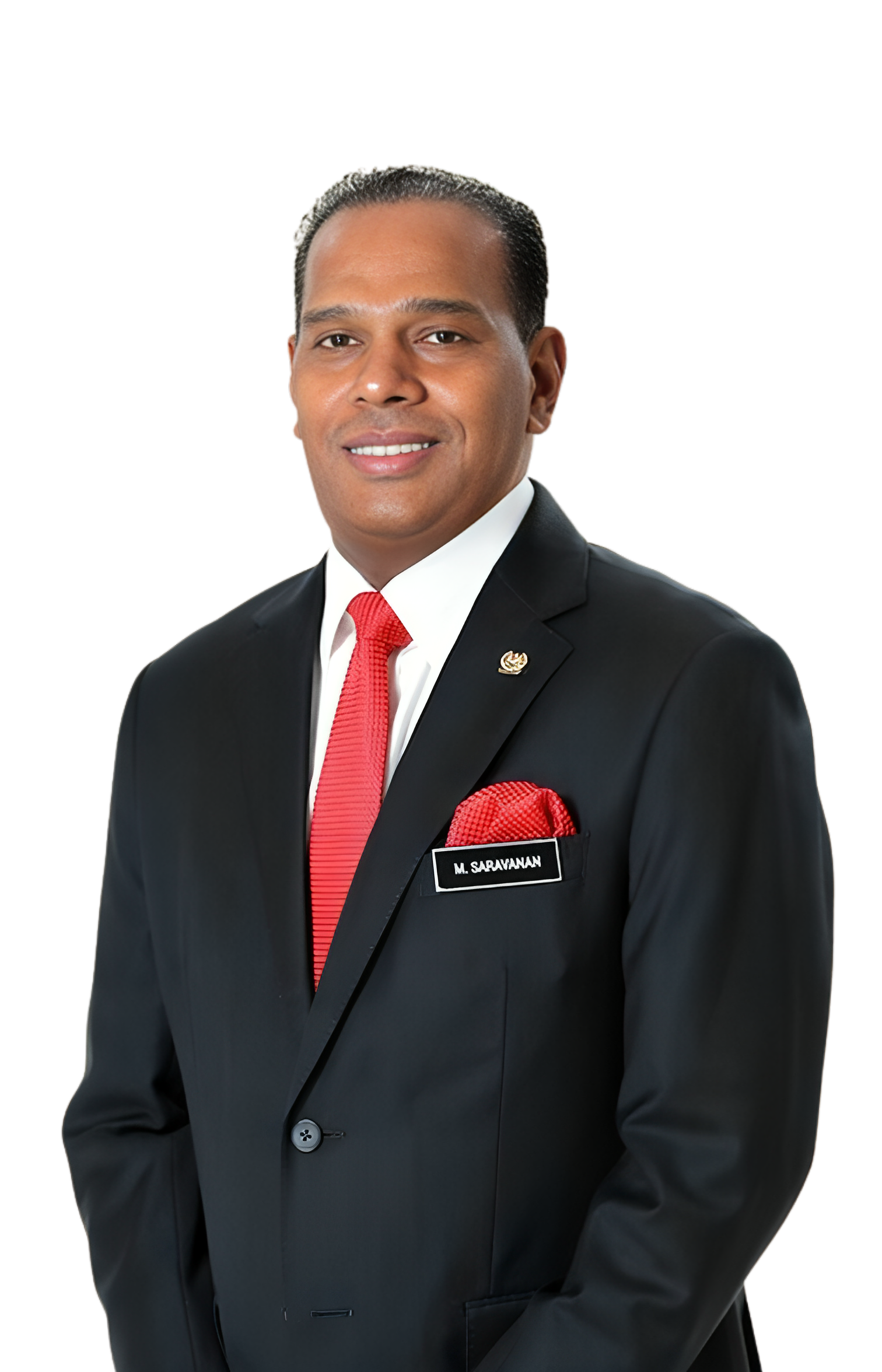

Minister of Human Resources
- In office 30 August 2021 – 24 November 2022
- Monarch: Abdullah
- Prime Minister: Ismail Sabri Yaakob
- Deputy: Awang Hashim
- Preceded by: Himself
- Succeeded by: Sivakumar Varatharaju
- Constituency: Tapah
- In office 10 March 2020 – 16 August 2021
- Monarch: Abdullah
- Prime Minister: Muhyiddin Yassin
- Deputy: Awang Hashim
- Preceded by: M. Kulasegaran
- Succeeded by: Himself
- Constituency: Tapah

Deputy Minister of Youth and Sports
- In office 16 May 2013 – 9 May 2018
- Monarchs: Abdul Halim (2013–2016); Muhammad V (2016–2018)
- Prime Minister: Najib Razak
- Minister: Khairy Jamaluddin
- Preceded by: Razali Ibrahim; Gan Ping Sieu
- Succeeded by: Steven Sim Chee Keong
- Constituency: Tapah

Deputy Minister of Federal Territories and Urban Wellbeing
- In office 9 April 2009 – 15 May 2013
- Monarchs: Mizan Zainal Abidin (2009–2011); Abdul Halim (2011–2013)
- Prime Minister: Najib Razak
- Minister: Raja Nong Chik Zainal Abidin
- Preceded by: Himself (Federal Territories)
- Succeeded by: Loga Bala Mohan Jaganathan (Federal Territories); Halimah Mohamed Sadique (Urban Wellbeing)
- Constituency: Tapah

Deputy Minister of Federal Territories
- In office 19 March 2008 – 9 April 2009
- Monarch: Mizan Zainal Abidin
- Prime Minister: Abdullah Ahmad Badawi (2008–2009); Najib Razak (2009)
- Minister: Zulhasnan Rafique
- Preceded by: Abu Seman Yusop
- Succeeded by: Himself (Deputy Minister of Federal Territories and Urban Wellbeing)
- Constituency: Tapah

Deputy President of the Malaysian Indian Congress
- Incumbent
- Assumed office 21 October 2018
- President: Vigneswaran Sanasee
- Preceded by: Devamany Krishnasamy

Member of the Malaysian Parliament for Tapah
- Incumbent
- Assumed office 8 March 2008
- Preceded by: Veerasingam Suppiah (BN–MIC)
- Majority: 3,020 (2008); 7,927 (2013); 614 (2018); 5,064 (2022)

Senator Appointed by the Yang di-Pertuan Agong
- In office 6 December 2000 – 5 December 2003
- Monarchs: Salahuddin (2000–2001); Syed Sirajuddin (2001–2003)
- Prime Minister: Mahathir Mohamad (2000–2003); Abdullah Ahmad Badawi (2003)

Faction represented in Dewan Rakyat
- 2008–: Barisan Nasional

Faction represented in Dewan Negara
- 2000–2003: Barisan Nasional

Personal details
- Born: Saravanan Murugan; 4 February 1968 (age 58) Sentul, Kuala Lumpur (then located in Selangor, now Federal Territory), Malaysia
- Party: Malaysian Indian Congress (MIC)
- Other political affiliations: Barisan Nasional (BN)
- Spouse: Kavitha Vivekanandan
- Children: 3, Dakshayani a/p Saravanan, Abetha a/p Saravanan, Arunagiri a/l Saravanan
- Occupation: Politician
- Website: msaravanan68.blogspot.com

Saravanan Murugan (Tamil: சரவணன் முருகன்; born 4 February 1968) commonly referred to as M. Saravanan (Tamil: எம். சரவணன்) is a Malaysian politician who has served as the Member of Parliament (MP) for Tapah since March 2008.

He served as the Minister of Human Resources in the Barisan Nasional (BN) administration under prime minister Ismail Sabri Yaakob from August 2021 to November 2022, and in the Perikatan Nasional (PN) administration under prime minister Muhyiddin Yassin from March 2020 to August 2021. He also served as Deputy Minister of Youth and Sports from May 2013 to May 2013 and Deputy Minister of Federal Territories from March 2008 to April 2009.

He is a member and Deputy President of the Malaysian Indian Congress (MIC), a component party of the BN coalition. From March 2020 to November 2022, he was the sole minister of the Indian ethnicity and from MIC, and the sole MIC candidate elected in the 2022 general election.

== Biography ==
Within the MIC, Saravanan was seen as an ally of its then-president Samy Vellu, being elected as a Vice President of the MIC on Vellu's ticket and defending Vellu from opposition attacks. However he lost in the party re-election close fight for the position of Deputy President in 2015 to another MIC Vice President, S. K. Devamany.

In the 2008 election, Saravanan contested for a Parliament seat for Tapah and won against a candidate from People's Justice Party (PKR). Under the Barisan Nasional coalition and then-Prime Minister Abdullah Ahmad Badawi, Saravanan was appointed as the Deputy Minister of Federal Territories and Urban Wellbeing from 2008 until 2013.

In the 2013 election, Saravanan also won a seat in the Parliament and was appointed as the Deputy Minister of Youth and Sports from 2013 until 2018. From 2020 to 2022, Saravanan served as the Minister of Human Resource under prime ministers Muhyiddin Yassin and later Ismail Sabri Yaakob.

In 2024, Saravanan retained his post as MIC deputy president for the 2024–2027 term after he was returned unopposed

== Election results ==
Parliament of Malaysia
Year	Constituency	Candidate	Votes	Pct	Opponent(s)	Votes	Pct	Ballots cast	Majority	Turnout
2008	P072 Tapah	Saravanan Murugan (MIC)	14,084	52.53%	Tan Seng Toh (PKR)	11,064	41.27%	26,811	3,020	70.12%
2013	P072 Tapah	Saravanan Murugan (MIC)	20,670	55.91%	Vasantha Kumar Krishnan (PKR)	12,743	34.48%	36,957	7,927	81.30%
2013	P072 Tapah	Saravanan Murugan (MIC)	20,670	55.91%	Shaharuzzaman Bistamam (BERJASA)	2,053	5.56%	36,957	7,927	81.30%
2013	P072 Tapah	Saravanan Murugan (MIC)	20,670	55.91%	Ridzuan Bani (IND)	337	0.91%	36,957	7,927	81.30%
2018	P072 Tapah	Saravanan Murugan (MIC)	16,086	44.47%	Mohamed Azni Mohamed Ali (BERSATU)	15,472	42.77%	37,113	614	78.75%
2018	P072 Tapah	Saravanan Murugan (MIC)	16,086	44.47%	Norazli Musa (PAS)	4,615	12.76%	37,113	614	78.75%
2022	P072 Tapah	Saravanan Murugan (MIC)	18,398	41.36%	Saraswathy Kandasami (PKR)	13,334	29.98%	44,481	5,064	71.81%
2022	P072 Tapah	Saravanan Murugan (MIC)	18,398	41.36%	Muhammad Yadzan Mohamad (BERSATU)	12,115	27.24%	44,481	5,064	71.81%
2022	P072 Tapah	Saravanan Murugan (MIC)	18,398	41.36%	Mior Nor Haidir Suhaimi (PEJUANG)	335	0.75%	44,481	5,064	71.81%
2022	P072 Tapah	Saravanan Murugan (MIC)	18,398	41.36%	Mohamed Akbar Sherrif Ali Yasin (WARISAN)	200	0.45%	44,481	5,064	71.81%
2022	P072 Tapah	Saravanan Murugan (MIC)	18,398	41.36%	M.Kathiravan (IND)	99	0.22%	44,481	5,064	71.81%

== Honours ==
=== Honours of Malaysia ===
- Malaysia
  - Member of the Order of the Defender of the Realm (AMN) (1998)
  - Recipient of the General Service Medal (PPA)
  - Recipient of the 17th Yang di-Pertuan Agong Installation Medal
- Federal Territory (Malaysia)
  - Grand Commander of the Order of the Territorial Crown (SMW) – Datuk Seri (2018)
  - Commander of the Order of the Territorial Crown (PMW) – Datuk (2014)
- Malacca
  - Companion Class I of the Exalted Order of Malacca (DMSM) – Datuk (2007)
