= K. Pathmanaban =

Malaysian politician (1937–2001)

Dato' Pathmanaban a/l Kunjamboo or K. Pathmanaban (Tamil: கு. பத்மநாபன், romanized: Ē. Puttānaṉpaṉ; 10 June 1937 – 9 June 2001) is a former Malaysian deputy minister, vice-president of Malaysian Indian Congress and founder of Melaka Manipal Medical College.

== Early life ==
Born in Bukit Bertam Estate, Linggi, Negeri Sembilan, he obtained his Master of Arts in Public Administration in Economic Development from Harvard University.

He was among the first batch of Bachelor of Arts graduates majoring in economics from the University of Malaya in Singapore in 1959. Before venturing into politics, he served as Assistant Secretary of the Labour and Manpower Ministry from 1960 and Director of Social Economics in the Economic Planning Unit (EPU) in the Prime Minister's Department from 1968 until his resignation to contest the Teluk Kemang parliamentary seat in 1974.

== Political career ==
Pathmanaban was initially encouraged to join the Malaysian Indian Congress (MIC) and enter politics by Tun Abdul Razak, who saw his potential and his education from a prestigious university as invaluable. He was inducted by the then president of MIC, Tan Sri V. Manickavasagam, as part of his process of infusing new blood into the party, especially those who are young, well-educated and could contribute to the party.

He served as Teluk Kemang member of parliament for four terms. Prior to that, he joined the Malaysian Indian Congress in 1974 and the following year was a member of the MIC Central Working Committee. Pathmanaban served as MIC vice-president for three terms from 1979 until his retirement from active politics in 1991.

Pathmanaban actively fought for the rights of Malaysian Indians, especially in the field of education. He realised the importance education could bring about in uplifting the Indian community.

He headed the MIC's Education Bureau and used to collect information on all students rejected by government universities. Pathmanaban used to lead MIC delegations to visit every vice-chancellor to give more places to Malaysian Indian students who had just missed the cut-off point. In fact, the Malaysian Chinese Association used to be jealous of the MIC in having this special privilege.

The former MIC vice-president was Deputy Labour and Manpower Minister for five years from 1976. Pathmanaban was Deputy Health Minister for seven years from 1981. He last served in the government as Deputy Human Resources Minister from June 1989 to October 1990.

His retirement from politics was apparently due to differences with MIC president, Datuk Seri S. Samy Vellu.

== Social Service ==
Following his retirement, Pathmanaban was active in social service. He felt there was nothing greater than helping a fellow man. He actively sought ways to help the poor and disadvantaged Indian communities in Malaysia.

He also served as a member of the Human Rights Commission of Malaysia (Suhakam) following the setting up of the commission until his demise.

Pathmanaban was the founding chairman of Melaka Manipal Medical College. He was instrumental in getting both the Prime Ministers and governments of Malaysia and India to give their nod for his pet project which offers a twinning medical programme between both countries. His main purpose of setting up the medical college was to provide high quality medical education opportunities to Malaysians at an affordable price, particularly for Malaysians of Indian ethnicity.

== Death ==
Datuk K. Pathmanaban died due to kidney and liver failure at the Pantai Medical Centre in Kuala Lumpur at around 1am on 9 June 2001. He was just one day short of his 64th birthday.

His remains were cremated at the Hindu crematorium in Cheras and the ashes were taken to Port Dickson to be scattered in the sea according to Hindu rites.
