= Minister of Youth and Sports (Malaysia) =

Cabinet position of Malaysia

- Menteri Belia dan Sukan منتري بليا دان سوكن
- Incumbent; Mohammed Taufiq Johari since 17 December 2025
- Ministry of Youth and Sports
- Style: Yang Berhormat Menteri (The Honourable Minister)
- Abbreviation: YBM KBS
- Member of: Cabinet of Malaysia
- Reports to: Parliament of Malaysia; Prime Minister of Malaysia
- Seat: Putrajaya
- Nominator: Prime Minister of Malaysia
- Appointer: Yang di-Pertuan Agong; on the recommendation of the Prime Minister of Malaysia
- Term length: At the pleasure of the Prime Minister
- Formation: 1964
- First holder: Tunku Abdul Rahman
- Deputy: Mordi Bimol
- Salary: RM14,907.20
- Website: www.kbs.gov.my

The current Minister of Youth and Sports (Malay: Menteri Belia dan Sukan; Jawi: منتري بليا دان سوكن) is Taufiq Johari from 17 December 2025. The Minister administers the portfolio through the Ministry of Youth and Sports.

== List of ministers of youth and sports ==
The following individuals have been appointed as Minister of Youth and Sports, or any of its precedent titles:

Political party: Alliance/BN PH PN

Portrait	Name (Birth–Death) Constituency	Political party	Title	Took office	Left office	Deputy Minister	Prime Minister (Cabinet)
	Tunku Abdul Rahman (1903–1990); MP for Kuala Kedah	Alliance (UMNO)	Minister of Youth and Sports	1964	1966	Vacant	Tunku Abdul Rahman (III)
	Senu Abdul Rahman (1919–1995); MP for Kubang Pasu Barat	Alliance (UMNO)	Minister of Youth and Sports	1966	1969	Vacant	Tunku Abdul Rahman (III)
	Hamzah Abu Samah (1924–2012); MP for Raub	Alliance (UMNO)	Minister of Youth and Sports	1969	1973	Vacant	Tunku Abdul Rahman (IV); Abdul Razak Hussein (I)
	Ali Ahmad (1930–1977); MP for Pontian Selatan (1973–1974); MP for Pontian (1974–1976)	BN (UMNO)	Minister of Culture, Youth and Sports	1973	1976	Vacant (1973–1976); Neo Yee Pan (1976); Vacant (1976)	Abdul Razak Hussein (I • II); Hussein Onn (I)
	Abdul Samad Idris (1923–2003); MP for Jelebu	BN (UMNO)	Minister of Culture, Youth and Sports	1976	1980	Mak Hon Kam (1976–1978); Chin Hon Ngian (1978–1980)	Hussein Onn (I • II)
	Mokhtar Hashim (1942–2020); MP for Tampin	BN (UMNO)	Minister of Culture, Youth and Sports	1980	1983	Chin Hon Ngian (1981–1982); Rosemary Chow Poh Keng (1982–1983)	Hussein Onn (II); Mahathir Mohamad (I • II)
	Anwar Ibrahim (b.1947); MP for Permatang Pauh	BN (UMNO)	Minister of Culture, Youth and Sports	1983	1984	Rosemary Chow Poh Keng	Mahathir Mohamad (II)
	Sulaiman Daud (1933–2010); MP for Santubong	BN (PBB)	Minister of Culture, Youth and Sports	1984	1986	Vacant (1984–1986); Rosemary Chow Poh Keng (1985–1986)	Mahathir Mohamad (II)
	Najib Razak (b.1953); MP for Pekan	BN (UMNO)	Minister of Culture, Youth and Sports	1986	1987	Wang Choon Wing	Mahathir Mohamad (III)
	Najib Razak (b.1953); MP for Pekan	BN (UMNO)	Minister of Youth and Sports	1987	1990	Wang Choon Wing (1987–1988); Teng Gaik Kwan (1988–1990)	Mahathir Mohamad (III)
	Annuar Musa (b.1956); Senator	BN (UMNO)	Minister of Youth and Sports	1990	1993	Teng Gaik Kwan	Mahathir Mohamad (IV)
	Abdul Ghani Othman (b.1946); MP for Ledang	BN (UMNO)	Minister of Youth and Sports	1993	1995	Teng Gaik Kwan	Mahathir Mohamad (IV)
	Muhyiddin Yassin (b.1947); MP for Pagoh	BN (UMNO)	Minister of Youth and Sports	1995	1999	Loke Yuen Yow	Mahathir Mohamad (V)
	Hishammuddin Hussein (b.1961); MP for Tenggara	BN (UMNO)	Minister of Youth and Sports	1999	2004	Ong Tee Keat	Mahathir Mohamad (VI); Abdullah Ahmad Badawi (I)
	Azalina Othman Said (b.1963); MP for Pengerang	BN (UMNO)	Minister of Youth and Sports	2004	2008	Ong Tee Keat (2004–2006); Liow Tiong Lai (2006–2008)	Abdullah Ahmad Badawi (II)
	Ismail Sabri Yaakob (b.1960); MP for Bera	BN (UMNO)	Minister of Youth and Sports	2008	2009	Wee Jeck Seng	Abdullah Ahmad Badawi (III)
	Ahmad Shabery Cheek (b. 1958); MP for Kemaman	BN (UMNO)	Minister of Youth and Sports	2009	2013	Razali Ibrahim (2009–2013); Wee Jeck Seng (2009–2010); Gan Peng Sieu (2010–2013)	Abdullah Ahmad Badawi (III); Najib Razak (I)
	Khairy Jamaluddin (b.1976); MP for Rembau	BN (UMNO)	Minister of Youth and Sports	16 May 2013	9 May 2018	Saravanan Murugan	Najib Razak (II)
	Syed Saddiq Syed Abdul Rahman (b.1992); MP for Muar	PH (BERSATU)	Minister of Youth and Sports	2 July 2018	24 February 2020	Steven Sim Chee Keong	Mahathir Mohamad (VII)
	Reezal Merican Naina Merican (b.1972); MP for Kepala Batas	BN (UMNO)	Minister of Youth and Sports	10 March 2020	16 August 2021	Wan Ahmad Fayhsal Wan Ahmad Kamal	Muhyiddin Yassin (I)
	Ahmad Faizal Azumu (b.1970); MP for Tambun	PN (BERSATU)	Minister of Youth and Sports	30 August 2021	24 November 2022	Ti Lian Ker	Ismail Sabri Yaakob (I)
	Hannah Yeoh Tseow Suan (b.1979); MP for Segambut	PH (DAP)	Minister of Youth and Sports	3 December 2022	17 December 2025	Adam Adli Abdul Halim	Anwar Ibrahim (I)
	Mohammed Taufiq Johari (b.1996); MP for Sungai Petani	PH (PKR)	Minister of Youth and Sports	17 December 2025	Incumbent	Mordi Bimol	Anwar Ibrahim (I)
