= Minister of Human Resources (Malaysia) =

Minister in Malaysia

- Menteri Sumber Manusia

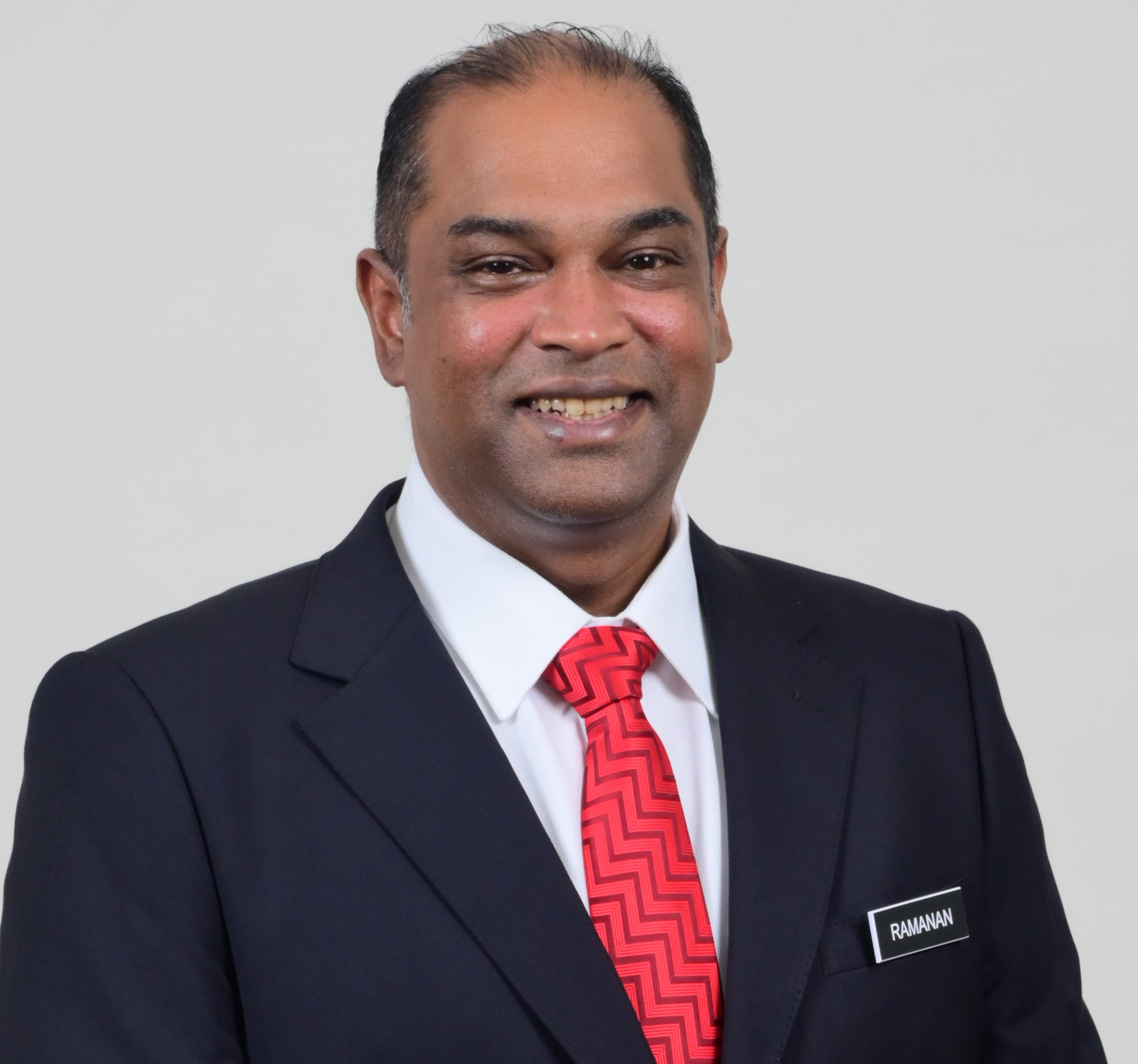
- Incumbent; Ramanan Ramakrishnan since 17 December 2025
- Ministry of Human Resources
- Style: Yang Berhormat Menteri (The Honourable Minister)
- Abbreviation: MOHR/KESUMA
- Member of: Cabinet of Malaysia
- Reports to: Parliament of Malaysia
- Seat: Putrajaya
- Appointer: Yang di-Pertuan Agong on the recommendation of the Prime Minister of Malaysia
- Formation: 9 August 1955
- First holder: V. T. Sambanthan as Minister of Labour
- Deputy: Khairul Firdaus Akbar Khan
- Website: www.mohr.gov.my

The Malaysian Minister of Human Resources (Malay: Menteri Sumber Manusia; Jawi: منتري سومبر مأنسي) is Ramanan Ramakrishnan (ரமணன் ராமகிருஷ்ணன்) since 17 December 2025.The minister was supported by Deputy Minister of Human Resources Khairul Firdaus Akbar Khan, since 17 December 2025. The Minister administers the portfolio through the Ministry of Human Resources.

== List of ministers ==
=== Human resources ===
The following individuals have been appointed as Minister of Human Resources, or any of its precedent titles:

Political party: Alliance/BN PH

Portrait	Name (Birth–Death) Constituency	Political party	Title	Took office	Left office	Deputy Minister	Prime Minister (Cabinet)
	Lim Ah Lek (b. 1942); MP for Bentong	BN (MCA)	Minister of Human Resources	26 October 1990	14 December 1999	M Mahalingam (1990–1994); Abdul Kadir Sheikh Fadzir (1995–1996); Affifuddin Omar (1996–1999)	Mahathir Mohamad (IV · V)
	Fong Chan Onn (b. 1944); MP for Selandar (1999-2004); MP for Alor Gajah (2004-2008)	BN (MCA)	Minister of Human Resources	15 December 1999	18 March 2008	Abdul Latiff Ahmad (1999–2004); Abdul Rahman Bakar (2004–2008)	Mahathir Mohamad (VI); Abdullah Ahmad Badawi (I · II)
	Subramaniam Sathasivam (b. 1953); MP for Segamat	BN (MIC)	Minister of Human Resources	19 March 2008	15 May 2013	Noraini Ahmad (2008–2009); Maznah Mazlan (2009–2013)	Abdullah Ahmad Badawi (III); Najib Razak (I)
	Richard Riot Jaem (b. 1951); MP for Serian	BN (SUPP)	Minister of Human Resources	16 May 2013	9 May 2018	Ismail Abdul Muttalib	Najib Razak (II)
	M. Kulasegaran (b. 1957); MP for Ipoh Barat	PH (DAP)	Minister of Human Resources	21 May 2018	24 February 2020	Mahfuz Omar	Mahathir Mohamad (VII)
	Saravanan Murugan (b. 1968); MP for Tapah	BN (MIC)	Minister of Human Resources	10 March 2020	24 November 2022	Awang Hashim	Muhyiddin Yassin (I); Ismail Sabri Yaakob (I)
	Sivakumar Varatharaju Naidu (b. 1970); MP for Batu Gajah	PH (DAP)	Minister of Human Resources	3 December 2022	12 December 2023	Mustapha Sakmud	Anwar Ibrahim (I)
	Steven Sim Chee Keong (b. 1982); MP for Bukit Mertajam	PH (DAP)	Minister of Human Resources	12 December 2023	17 December 2025	Abdul Rahman Mohamad	Anwar Ibrahim (I)
	Ramanan Ramakrishnan (b. 1981); MP for Sungai Buloh	PH (PKR)	Minister of Human Resources	17 December 2025	Incumbent	Khairul Firdaus Akbar Khan	Anwar Ibrahim (I)

=== Labour ===
The following individuals have been appointed as Minister of Labour, or any of its precedent titles:

Political party: Alliance/BN

Portrait	Name (Birth–Death) Constituency	Political party	Title	Took office	Left office	Deputy Minister	Prime Minister (Cabinet)
	V. T. Sambanthan (1919–1979); MP for Kinta Utara	Alliance (MIC)	Minister of Labour	1955	1957	Vacant	Chief Minister of the Federation of Malaya; Tunku Abdul Rahman
	Ong Yoke Lin (1917–2010); MP for Ulu Selangor	Alliance (MCA)	Minister of Labour and Social Welfare	1957	1959	Vacant	Tunku Abdul Rahman (I · II)
	Bahaman Samsudin (1906–1995); MP for Kuala Pilah	Alliance (UMNO)	Minister of Labour	1959	1964	Vacant	Tunku Abdul Rahman (II)
	Bahaman Samsudin (1906–1995); MP for Kuala Pilah	Alliance (UMNO)	Minister of Labour and Social Welfare	1959	1964	Vacant	Tunku Abdul Rahman (II)
	V. Manickavasagam (1926–1979); MP for Klang	Alliance (MIC)	Minister of Labour	1964	1971	Vacant	Tunku Abdul Rahman (III); Abdul Razak Hussein (I)
	V. Manickavasagam (1926–1979); MP for Klang	Alliance (MIC)	Minister of Labour and Manpower	1971	1974	Vacant	Tunku Abdul Rahman (III); Abdul Razak Hussein (I)
	Lee San Choon (1935–2023); MP for Segamat	BN (MCA)	Minister of Labour and Manpower	1974	1978	Hassan Adli Arshad (1974–1976); K. Pathmanaban (1976–1978)	Abdul Razak Hussein (II); Hussein Onn (I)
	Richard Ho Ung Hun (1927–2008); MP for Lumut	BN (MCA)	Minister of Labour and Manpower	1978	1982	K. Pathmanaban (1978–1981); Zakaria Abdul Rahman (1981–1982)	Hussein Onn (II); Mahathir Mohamad (I)
	Mak Hon Kam (1939-2015); MP for Tanjong Malim	BN (MCA)	Minister of Labour and Manpower	1982	1985	Zakaria Abdul Rahman (1982–1985); William Lye Chee Hien (1982–1985)	Mahathir Mohamad (II)
	Lee Kim Sai (1937-2019); MP for Ulu Selangor (1985-1986); MP for Hulu Langat (1986-1989)	BN (MCA)	Minister of Labour	1985	14 August 1989	Zakaria Abdul Rahman (1985–1986); William Lye Chee Hien (1985–1986); Wan Abu Bakar Wan Mohamad (1986–1989); Kalakau Untol (1986–1989); K. Pathmanaban (1989)	Mahathir Mohamad (II · III)
	Lim Ah Lek (b. 1942); MP for Bentong	BN (MCA)	Minister of Labour	14 August 1989	26 October 1990	Kalakau Untol (1989–1990); K. Pathmanaban (1989–1990)	Mahathir Mohamad (III)

=== Manpower ===
The following individuals have been appointed as Minister of Manpower, or any of its precedent titles:

Political party: Alliance/BN

Portrait	Name (Birth–Death) Constituency	Political party	Title	Took office	Left office	Deputy Minister	Prime Minister (Cabinet)
	V. Manickavasagam (1926–1979); MP for Klang	Alliance (MIC)	Minister of Labour and Manpower	1971	1974	Vacant	Abdul Razak Hussein (I)
	Lee San Choon (1935–2023); MP for Segamat	BN (MCA)	Minister of Labour and Manpower	1974	1978	Hassan Adli Arshad (1974–1976); K. Pathmanaban (1976–1978)	Abdul Razak Hussein (II); Hussein Onn (I)
	Richard Ho Ung Hun (1927–2008); MP for Lumut	BN (MCA)	Minister of Labour and Manpower	1978	1982	K. Pathmanaban (1978–1981); Zakaria Abdul Rahman (1981–1982)	Hussein Onn (II); Mahathir Mohamad (I)
	Mak Hon Kam (1939-2015); MP for Tanjong Malim	BN (MCA)	Minister of Labour and Manpower	1982	1985	Zakaria Abdul Rahman (1982–1985); William Lye Chee Hien (1982–1985)	Mahathir Mohamad (II)
