= V. Manickavasagam =

Malaysian politician

Yang Berbahagia Tan Sri Dato' Seri V. Manickavasagam PMN SPMS JMN PJK
- மாணிக்கவாசகம் பிள்ளை

6th President of the Malaysian Indian Congress
- In office 30 June 1973 – 12 October 1979
- Preceded by: V. T. Sambanthan
- Succeeded by: Samy Vellu

Personal details
- Born: 4 October 1926 Klang, Selangor, Federated Malay States, British Malaya (now Malaysia)
- Died: 12 October 1979 (aged 53) Kuala Lumpur, Malaysia
- Party: Malaysian Indian Congress (MIC)
- Occupation: Politician

V. Manickavasagam Pillai (Tamil: மாணிக்கவாசகம் பிள்ளை, romanized: Māṇikkavācakam piḷḷai; 4 October 1926 – 12 October 1979) was a Malaysian politician who served as Minister of Communications. He was a member and served as 6th President of the Malaysian Indian Congress (MIC), a component party of the ruling Barisan Nasional (BN) coalition from June 1973 to his death in October 1979.

== President of MIC ==
Manickavasagam became president of MIC as a result of increased resistance of the grassroot members to Tun V.T. Sambanthan's style of leadership, who had been president of the party for 18 years.

Under Manickavasagam's leadership, the MIC was put on a strong footing with buildings, offices and staff in various parts of the country and the party system organised and its capacity to deal with issues enhanced.

It was during this period that the MIC, as member of the Alliance, became part of the Barisan Nasional. The party sponsored the Nesa Multipurpose Cooperative and the MIC Unit Trust as part of its programme for economic ventures, and also set up the MIC Education Fund for members' children and the Malaysian Indian Scholarship Fund for higher education as well as acquiring an Institute for training Indians in technical and trade skills.

=== Blue Book ===
Manickavasagam had a vision for the Malaysian Indian community. He organised the First Indian Economic Seminar and as a result the Blue Book came about. It was a development plan for the economic growth of the Indian community.

The Blue Book was an orchestrated effort of a think-tank of top Indian business, political and education leaders collaborating to augment the future of the Malaysian Indian community. Maika Holdings and Maju Institute of Education and Development (MIED) and others are a direct result of the Blue Book.

=== Infusing new blood ===
When Manickavasagam became president of the Malaysian Indian Congress, he decided to introduce new faces to the party in leadership positions. This was the time when S. Subramaniam, K. Pathmanaban, a Harvard MBA holder, and several others entered the political arena to infuse new blood into MIC, and Manickavasagam gave them preference. They were young, well-educated and ambitious but lacked grassroots experience.

This made S. Samy Vellu, who was then MIC vice-president, bitter as he felt he was being sidelined. Samy Vellu was one of the five leaders who dared defy former president V.T. Sambanthan and propel Manickavasagam to the presidency of the party.

Subramaniam, then the secretary general of MIC, was hand-picked by Manickavasagam to become deputy president and succeed him. However, Samy Vellu fought back, literally, and in the 1977 party elections he managed to beat Subramaniam by a mere 26 votes to become the Deputy President of MIC.

== Death ==
Manickavasagam died in 1979 while still in office. His deputy, S. Samy Vellu was made acting president of MIC and remained president until 6 December 2010.

== Honours ==
=== Honours of Malaysia ===
- Malaya
  - Companion of the Order of the Defender of the Realm (JMN) (1958)
- Malaysia
  - Recipient of the Malaysian Commemorative Medal (Gold) (PPM) (1965)
  - Commander of the Order of the Defender of the Realm (PMN) – Tan Sri (1970)
- Selangor
  - Knight Grand Commander of the Order of the Crown of Selangor (SPMS) – Dato' Seri (1970)

Political offices
Preceded by V. T. Sambanthan	Malaysian Indian Congress (MIC) President; 30 June 1973 – 12 October 1979	Succeeded by Samy Vellu
