= Deputy Minister of Defence (Malaysia) =

Malaysian government deputy minister

- Timbalan Menteri Pertahanan
- Coat of Arms of Government of Malaysia

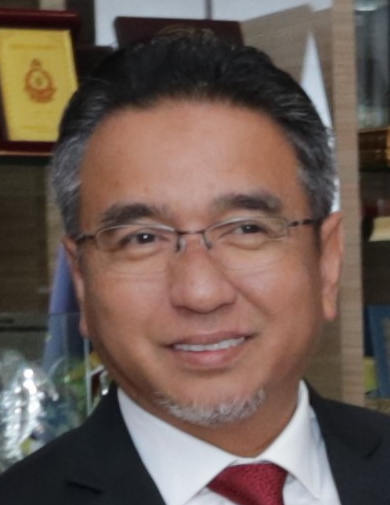
- Incumbent; Adly Zahari since 10 December 2022
- Ministry of Defence
- Style: Yang Berhormat
- Member of: Cabinet of Malaysia
- Reports to: Prime Minister; Minister of Defence
- Seat: Kuala Lumpur
- Appointer: Yang di-Pertuan Agong on advice of the Prime Minister
- Term length: No fixed term
- Inaugural holder: Musa Hitam (as Assistant Minister of Defence)
- Formation: 1969

The Deputy Minister of Defence (Malay: Timbalan Menteri Pertahanan; Chinese: 国防部副部长; Tamil: பாதுகாப்பு துணை அமைச்சர் ) is a Malaysian cabinet position serving as deputy head of the Ministry of Defence.

== List of Deputy Ministers of Defence ==
The following individuals have been appointed as Deputy Minister of Defence, or any of its precedent titles:

Colour key (for political coalition/parties):

| Coalition | Component party | Timeline |
|---|---|---|
| Alliance Party | United Malays National Organisation (UMNO) | 1957–1973 |
| Barisan Nasional (BN) | United Malays National Organisation (UMNO) | 1973–present |
| Barisan Nasional (BN) | Parti Pesaka Bumiputera Bersatu (PBB) | 1973–2018 |
| Pakatan Harapan (PH) | Democratic Action Party (DAP) | 2015–present |
| Pakatan Harapan (PH) | National Trust Party (AMANAH) | 2015–present |
| Pakatan Harapan (PH) | Malaysian United Indigenous Party (BERSATU) | 2015–2020 |
| Perikatan Nasional (PN) | Malaysian United Indigenous Party (BERSATU) | 2020–present |

=== Assistant Minister of Defence ===
| Portrait | Name (Birth–Death) Constituency | Political coalition | Political party | Took office | Left office | Prime Minister (Cabinet) |
|---|---|---|---|---|---|---|
| | Musa Hitam (b.1934); MP for Segamat Utara | BN | UMNO | | | Tunku Abdul Rahman (IIII) |
| | Tengku Ahmad Rithauddeen Ismail (1928–2022); MP for Kota Bharu Hilir | BN | UMNO | | | Abdul Razak Hussein (I) |
Post renamed to Deputy Minister of Defence
=== Deputy Minister of Defence ===
| Portrait | Name (Birth–Death) Constituency | Political coalition | Political party | Took office | Left office | Prime Minister (Cabinet) |
| | Dzulkifli Abdul Hamid (?–?); Senator | BN | UMNO | | | Abdul Razak Hussein (II) |
| | Mokhtar Hashim (1942–2020); MP for Tampin | BN | UMNO | | | Abdul Razak Hussein (II); Hussein Onn (I · II) |
| | Abu Hassan Omar (1940–2018); MP for Kuala Selangor | BN | UMNO | 1980 | 1981 | Hussein Onn (II) |
| | Abang Abu Bakar Abang Mustapha (1941–2023); MP for Paloh | BN | PBB | 17 July 1981 | 26 October 1990 | Mahathir Mohamad (I · II · III) |
| | Wan Abu Bakar Wan Mohamed (?–?); MP for Jerantut | BN | UMNO | 27 October 1990 | 3 May 1995 | Mahathir Mohamad (IIII) |
| | Abdullah Fadzil Che Wan (?–?); MP for Bukit Gantang | BN | UMNO | 8 May 1995 | 14 December 1999 | Mahathir Mohamad (V) |
| | Shafie Apdal (b.1956); MP for Semporna | BN | UMNO | 15 December 1999 | 26 March 2004 | Mahathir Mohamad (VI); Abdullah Ahmad Badawi (I) |
| | Zainal Abidin Zin (b.1940); MP for Bagan Serai | BN | UMNO | 27 March 2004 | 18 March 2008 | Abdullah Ahmad Badawi (II) |
| | Abu Seman Yusop (b.1944); MP for Masjid Tanah | BN | UMNO | 19 March 2008 | 9 April 2009 | Abdullah Ahmad Badawi (III) |
| | Abdul Latiff Ahmad (b.1958); MP for Mersing | BN | UMNO | 10 April 2009 | 15 May 2013 | Najib Razak (I) |
| | Abdul Rahim Bakri (b.1961); MP for Kudat | BN | UMNO | 16 May 2013 | 29 July 2015 | Najib Razak (II) |
| | Mohd Johari Baharum (b.1954); MP for Kubang Pasu | BN | UMNO | 29 July 2015 | 9 May 2018 | Najib Razak (II) |
| | Liew Chin Tong (b.1977); Senator | PH | DAP | 17 July 2018 | 24 February 2020 | Mahathir Mohamad (VII) |
| | Ikmal Hisham Abdul Aziz (b.1965); MP for Tanah Merah | PN | BERSATU | 10 March 2020 | 24 November 2022 | Muhyiddin Yassin (I); Ismail Sabri Yaakob (I) |
| | Adly Zahari (b.1971); MP for Alor Gajah | PH | AMANAH | 10 December 2022 | Incumbent | Anwar Ibrahim (I) |

== See also ==
- Minister of Defence (Malaysia)
