= First Mahathir cabinet =

- 9th Cabinet of Malaysia

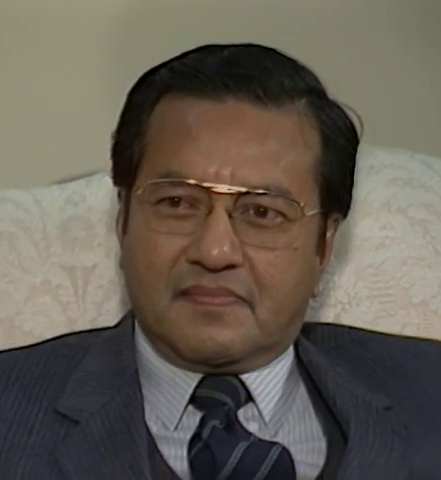

People and organisations
- Head of state: Tuanku Ahmad Shah
- Head of government: Mahathir Mohamad
- Deputy head of government: Musa Hitam
- Member parties: Barisan Nasional: United Malays National Organisation; Malaysian Chinese Association; United Sabah National Organisation; Malaysian People's Movement Party; United Traditional Bumiputera Party; Sabah People's United Front; Sarawak United Peoples' Party; Sarawak National Party; Malaysian Indian Congress
- Status in legislature: Coalition government
- Opposition parties: Democratic Action Party; Pan-Malaysian Islamic Party; Sarawak People's Organization
- Opposition leader: Lim Kit Siang

History
- Outgoing election: 1982 Malaysian general election
- Legislature term: 5th Malaysian Parliament
- Budget: 1982
- Predecessor: Second Hussein cabinet
- Successor: Second Mahathir cabinet

Mahathir Mohamad, the fourth Prime Minister of Malaysia, formed the first Mahathir cabinet in 1981 after being invited by Tuanku Ahmad Shah to form a new government. It was the 9th cabinet of Malaysia formed since independence.

== Composition ==
=== Full members ===
The federal cabinet consisted of the following ministers:

Portfolio	Office bearer	Party	Constituency	Term start	Term end
Prime Minister	Dato' Seri Mahathir Mohamad MP	UMNO	Kubang Pasu	16 July 1981	30 April 1982
Minister of Defence	Dato' Seri Mahathir Mohamad MP	UMNO	Kubang Pasu	16 July 1981	30 April 1982
Deputy Prime Minister	Dato' Musa Hitam MP	UMNO	Labis	18 July 1981	30 April 1982
Minister of Home Affairs	Dato' Musa Hitam MP	UMNO	Labis	17 July 1981	30 April 1982
Minister of Transport	Dato' Lee San Choon MP	MCA	Segamat	16 July 1981	30 April 1982
Minister of Science, Technology and Environment	Tan Sri Ong Kee Hui MP	SUPP	Bandar Kuching	16 July 1981	30 April 1982
Minister of Foreign Affairs	Tan Sri Ghazali Shafie MP	UMNO	Lipis	17 July 1981	30 April 1982
Minister of General Welfare	Datin Paduka Aishah Ghani MP	UMNO	Kuala Langat	16 July 1981	30 April 1982
Minister of Commerce and Industry	Dato' Sri Tengku Ahmad Rithauddeen Tengku Ismail MP	UMNO	Kota Bharu	17 July 1981	30 April 1982
Minister of Finance	Tan Sri Tengku Razaleigh Hamzah MP	UMNO	Ulu Kelantan	16 July 1981	30 April 1982
Minister of Health	Tan Sri Chong Hon Nyan MP	MCA	Batu Berendam	16 July 1981	30 April 1982
Minister of Lands and Regional Development	Shariff Ahmad MP	UMNO	Jerantut	16 July 1981	30 April 1982
Minister of Information	Dato' Mohamed Rahmat MP	UMNO	Pulai	16 July 1981	30 April 1982
Minister of Labour and Manpower	Dato' Richard Ho Ung Hun MP	MCA	Lumut	16 July 1981	30 April 1982
Minister of Primary Industries	Paul Leong Khee Seong MP	GERAKAN	Taiping	16 July 1981	30 April 1982
Minister of Agriculture	Abdul Manan Othman MP	UMNO	Kuala Trengganu	16 July 1981	30 April 1982
Minister of Energy, Telecommunications and Posts	Dato' Leo Moggie Irok MP	SNAP	Kanowit	16 July 1981	30 April 1982
Minister of Housing and Local Government	Dato' Neo Yee Pan MP	MCA	Muar	16 July 1981	30 April 1982
Minister of Works and Public Amenities	Dato' Samy Vellu MP	MIC	Sungei Siput	16 July 1981	30 April 1982
Minister of Culture, Youth and Sports	Mokhtar Hashim MP	UMNO	Tampin	16 July 1981	30 April 1982
Minister of Public Enterprises	Datin Paduka Rafidah Aziz MP	UMNO	Selayang	16 July 1981	30 April 1982
Minister of Education	Sulaiman Daud MP	PBB	Santubong	17 July 1981	30 April 1982
Minister of Federal Territories	Pengiran Othman Pengiran Rauf MP	BERJAYA	Kimanis	17 July 1981	30 April 1982
Minister of National and Rural Development	Sanusi Junid MP	UMNO	Jerlun-Langkawi	17 July 1981	30 April 1982
Minister in the Prime Minister's Department	Senator Mohamed Nasir	BERJASA	Senator	16 July 1981	30 April 1982
Minister without Portfolio	Abdullah Ahmad Badawi MP	UMNO	Kepala Batas	17 July 1981	30 April 1982

=== Deputy ministers ===
Portfolio	Office bearer	Party	Constituency	Term start	Term end
Deputy Minister in the Prime Minister's Department	Kamaruddin Mohamed Isa MP	UMNO	Larut	16 July 1981	30 April 1982
Deputy Minister in the Prime Minister's Department	Abdullah Abdul Rahman MP	UMNO	Ulu Nerus	16 July 1981	30 April 1982
Deputy Minister in the Prime Minister's Department	Goh Cheng Teik MP	GERAKAN	Nibong Tebal	17 July 1981	30 April 1982
Deputy Minister of Education	Chan Siang Sun MP	MCA	Bentong	16 July 1981	30 April 1982
Deputy Minister of Education	Dato' Suhaimi Kamaruddin MP	UMNO	Sepang	17 July 1981	30 April 1982
Deputy Minister of Agriculture	Edmund Langgu Saga MP	SNAP	Saratok	16 July 1981	30 April 1982
Deputy Minister of Health	K. Pathmanaban MP	MIC	Telok Kemang	17 July 1981	30 April 1982
Deputy Minister of Commerce and Industry	Dato' Lew Sip Hon MP	MCA	Shah Alam	16 July 1981	30 April 1982
Deputy Minister of Commerce and Industry	Dato' Shahrir Abdul Samad MP	UMNO	Johore Bahru	17 July 1981	30 April 1982
Deputy Minister of Information	Ling Liong Sik MP	MCA	Mata Kuching	16 July 1981	30 April 1982
Deputy Minister of Labour and Manpower	Zakaria Abdul Rahman MP	UMNO	Besut	17 July 1981	30 April 1982
Deputy Minister of Finance	Mak Hon Kam MP	MCA	Tanjong Malim	16 July 1981	30 April 1982
Deputy Minister of Finance	Najib Razak MP	UMNO	Pekan	17 July 1981	30 April 1982
Deputy Minister of Works and Public Amenities	Nik Hussein Wan Abdul Rahman MP	UMNO	Kuala Krai	17 July 1981	30 April 1982
Deputy Minister of Energy, Telecommunications and Posts	Clarence E. Mansul MP	BERJAYA	Penampang	17 July 1981	30 April 1982
Deputy Minister of Culture, Youth and Sports	Chin Hon Ngian MP	MCA	Renggam	16 July 1981	30 April 1982
Deputy Minister of Information	Embong Yahya MP	UMNO	Ledang	16 July 1981	30 April 1982
Deputy Minister of Transport	Dato' Abu Hassan Omar MP	UMNO	Kuala Selangor	17 July 1981	30 April 1982
Deputy Minister of Labour and Manpower	William Lye Chee Hien MP	BERJAYA	Gaya	16 July 1981	30 April 1982
Deputy Minister of Housing and Local Government	Abdul Jalal Abu Bakar MP	UMNO	Batu Pahat	17 July 1981	30 April 1982
Deputy Minister of Primary Industries	Bujang Ulis MP	PBB	Simunjan	16 July 1981	30 April 1982
Deputy Minister of Federal Territories	Idris Abdul Rauf MP	UMNO	Parit Buntar	17 July 1981	30 April 1982
Deputy Minister of Home Affairs	Abdul Rahim Thamby Chik MP	UMNO	Alor Gajah	17 July 1981	30 April 1982
Deputy Minister of Defence	Abang Abu Bakar Abang Mustapha MP	PBB	Paloh	17 July 1981	30 April 1982

== Composition before cabinet dissolution ==
=== Full members ===
Office	Incumbent	Party	Constituency
Prime Minister	Mahathir Mohamad MP	UMNO	Kubang Pasu
Minister of Defence	Mahathir Mohamad MP	UMNO	Kubang Pasu
Deputy Prime Minister	Musa Hitam MP	UMNO	Labis
Minister of Home Affairs	Musa Hitam MP	UMNO	Labis
Minister of Transport	Lee San Choon MP	MCA	Segamat
Minister of Science, Technology and Environment	Ong Kee Hui MP	SUPP	Bandar Kuching
Minister of Foreign Affairs	Ghazali Shafie MP	UMNO	Lipis
Minister of General Welfare	Aishah Ghani MP	UMNO	Kuala Langat
Minister of Commerce and Industry	Tengku Ahmad Rithauddeen Tengku Ismail MP	UMNO	Kota Bharu
Minister of Finance	Tengku Razaleigh Hamzah MP	UMNO	Ulu Kelantan
Minister of Health	Chong Hon Nyan MP	MCA	Batu Berendam
Minister of Lands and Regional Development	Shariff Ahmad MP	UMNO	Jerantut
Minister of Information	Mohamed Rahmat MP	UMNO	Pulai
Minister of Labour and Manpower	Richard Ho Ung Hun MP	MCA	Lumut
Minister of Primary Industries	Paul Leong Khee Seong MP	GERAKAN	Taiping
Minister of Agriculture	Abdul Manan Othman MP	UMNO	Kuala Trengganu
Minister of Energy, Telecommunications and Posts	Leo Moggie Irok MP	SNAP	Kanowit
Minister of Housing and Local Government	Neo Yee Pan MP	MCA	Muar
Minister of Works and Public Amenities	Samy Vellu MP	MIC	Sungei Siput
Minister of Culture, Youth and Sports	Mokhtar Hashim MP	UMNO	Tampin
Minister of Public Enterprises	Rafidah Aziz MP	UMNO	Selayang
Minister of Education	Sulaiman Daud MP	PBB	Santubong
Minister of Federal Territories	Pengiran Othman Pengiran Rauf MP	BERJAYA	Kimanis
Minister of National and Rural Development	Sanusi Junid MP	UMNO	Jerlun-Langkawi
Minister without Portfolio	Abdullah Ahmad Badawi MP	UMNO	Kepala Batas
Minister in the Prime Minister's Department	Senator Mohamed Nasir	BERJASA	

=== Deputy ministers ===
Office	Incumbent	Party	Constituency
Deputy Minister in the Prime Minister's Department	Kamaruddin Mohamed Isa MP	UMNO	Larut
Deputy Minister in the Prime Minister's Department	Abdullah Abdul Rahman MP	UMNO	Ulu Nerus
Deputy Minister in the Prime Minister's Department	Goh Cheng Teik MP	GERAKAN	Nibong Tebal
Deputy Minister of Education	Chan Siang Sun MP	MCA	Bentong
Deputy Minister of Agriculture	Edmund Langgu Saga MP	SNAP	Saratok
Deputy Minister of Health	K. Pathmanaban MP	MIC	Telok Kemang
Deputy Minister of Commerce and Industry	Lew Sip Hon MP	MCA	Shah Alam
Deputy Minister of Commerce and Industry	Shahrir Abdul Samad MP	UMNO	Johor Bahru
Deputy Minister of Information	Ling Liong Sik MP	MCA	Mata Kuching
Deputy Minister of Labour and Manpower	Zakaria Abdul Rahman MP	UMNO	Besut
Deputy Minister of Finance	Mak Hon Kam MP	MCA	Tanjong Malim
Deputy Minister of Finance	Najib Razak MP	UMNO	Pekan
Deputy Minister of Works and Public Amenities	Nik Hussein Wan Abdul Rahman MP	UMNO	Kuala Krai
Deputy Minister of Energy, Telecommunications and Posts	Clarence E. Mansul MP	BERJAYA	Penampang
Deputy Minister of Culture, Youth and Sports	Chin Hon Ngian MP	MCA	Renggam
Deputy Minister of Information	Embong Yahya MP	UMNO	Ledang
Deputy Minister of Transport	Abu Hassan Omar MP	UMNO	Kuala Selangor
Deputy Minister of Labour and Manpower	William Lye Chee Hien MP	BERJAYA	Gaya
Deputy Minister of Education	Suhaimi Kamaruddin MP	UMNO	Sepang
Deputy Minister of Housing and Local Government	Abdul Jalal Abu Bakar MP	UMNO	Batu Pahat
Deputy Minister of Primary Industries	Bujang Ulis MP	PBB	Simunjan
Deputy Minister of Federal Territories	Idris Abdul Rauf MP	UMNO	Parit Buntar
Deputy Minister of Home Affairs	Abdul Rahim Thamby Chik MP	UMNO	Alor Gajah
Deputy Minister of Defence	Abang Abu Bakar Abang Mustapha MP	PBB	Paloh

== See also ==
- Members of the Dewan Rakyat, 5th Malaysian Parliament
- List of parliamentary secretaries of Malaysia § First Mahathir cabinet
