= Minister in the Prime Minister's Department =

Administers a portfolio through the Prime Minister's Department

- Menteri di Jabatan Perdana Menteri منتري دجابتن ڤردان منتري
- Incumbent; Azalina Othman Said; Zulkifli Hasan; Hannah Yeoh Tseow Suan; Mustapha Sakmud since 17 December 2025
- Prime Minister's Department
- Style: Yang Berhormat Menteri (The Honourable Minister)
- Member of: Cabinet of Malaysia
- Reports to: Parliament of Malaysia
- Seat: Perdana Putra, Putrajaya
- Appointer: Yang di-Pertuan Agong on the recommendation of the Prime Minister
- Formation: July 1957
- First holder: Abdul Rahman Talib (Minister Without Portfolio)
- Website: www.jpm.gov.my

The Minister in the Prime Minister's Department (Malay: Menteri di Jabatan Perdana Menteri; Jawi: منتري دجابتن ڤردان منتري) is a member of Cabinet of Malaysia who administers a portfolio through the Prime Minister's Department.

== List of ministers in the Prime Minister's Department ==
The following individuals have been appointed Minister in the Prime Minister's Department, or any of its precedent titles:

Political Party: Alliance/BN PH WARISAN MAP PN PBS GPS GRS Independent

Name (Birth–Death) Constituency	Portrait	Political party	Responsible for	Term of office		Prime Minister
Abdul Rahman Talib (1916–1968); MP for Kuantan		Alliance (UMNO)	Minister without Portfolio	1959	1960	Tunku Abdul Rahman
Sulaiman Abdul Rahman (unknown– 1963); MP for Muar Selatan		Alliance (UMNO)	Minister without Portfolio	1962	1963	Tunku Abdul Rahman
Abdul Aziz Ishak (1914–1999); MP for Kuala Langat		Alliance (UMNO)	Minister without Portfolio	1962	1963	Tunku Abdul Rahman
Ong Yoke Lin (1917–2010); MP for Ulu Selangor; Senator		Alliance (MCA)	Minister without Portfolio	1962	1969	Tunku Abdul Rahman
Khaw Kai Boh (b. unknown); Senator		Alliance (MCA)	Minister without Portfolio	1963	1964	Tunku Abdul Rahman
Ghafar Baba (1925–2006); Senator		Alliance (UMNO)	Minister without Portfolio	1968	1969	Tunku Abdul Rahman
Ong Yoke Lin (1917–2010); Senator		Alliance (MCA)	Minister without Portfolio	1970	1972	Abdul Razak Hussein
Lee Siok Yew (b. unknown); MP for Sepang		Alliance (MCA)	Minister without Portfolio	1970	1972	Abdul Razak Hussein
Ghazali Shafie (1922–2010); Senator		Alliance (UMNO)	Minister with Special Functions	1970	1972	Abdul Razak Hussein
Asri Muda (1923–1992); MP for Kota Bharu Hulu (1973–1974); MP for Nilam Puri (1974–1976)		BN (PAS)	Minister with Special Functions	1973	1976	Abdul Razak Hussein
Tengku Ahmad Rithauddeen Tengku Ismail (1932–2022); MP for Kota Bharu Hilir (1973–1974); MP for Kota Bharu (1974–1976)		BN (UMNO)	Minister with Special Functions	1973	1976	Abdul Razak Hussein
Michael Chen Wing Sum (1932–2024); MP for Ulu Selangor		BN (MCA)	Minister with Special Functions	1973	1974	Abdul Razak Hussein
Khir Johari (1923–2006); MP for Kedah Tengah		BN (UMNO)	Minister without Portfolio	1973	1974	Abdul Razak Hussein
Abdul Taib Mahmud (1936–2024); MP for Samarahan		BN (PBB)	Minister with Special Functions	1975	1976	Abdul Razak Hussein
Abdul Samad Idris (1923–2006); MP for Kuala Pilah		BN (UMNO)	Minister without Portfolio	1976	1978	Hussein Onn
Chong Hon Nyan (1924–2020); MP for Batu Berendam		BN (MCA)	Minister without Portfolio	1976	1978	Hussein Onn
Richard Ho Ung Hun (1927–2008); MP for Lumut		BN (MCA)	Minister without Portfolio	1977	1978	Hussein Onn
Pengiran Othman Pengiran Rauf (b. unknown); MP for Kimanis		BN (BERJAYA)	Minister without Portfolio	29 July 1978	16 July 1981	Hussein Onn
Mohamed Nasir (b. unknown); Senator		BN (BERJASA)	Minister without Portfolio	29 July 1978	16 July 1981	Hussein Onn
Mohamed Nasir (b. unknown); Senator		BN (BERJASA)	Minister without Portfolio	17 July 1981	4 May 1982	Mahathir Mohamad (I)
Abdullah Ahmad Badawi (1939–2025); MP for Kepala Batas		BN (UMNO)	Minister without Portfolio	17 July 1981	4 May 1982	Mahathir Mohamad (I)
Mohamed Nasir (b. unknown); Senator		BN (BERJASA)		5 May 1982	17 July 1984	Mahathir Mohamad (II)
Abdullah Ahmad Badawi (1939–2025); MP for Kepala Batas		BN (UMNO)		5 May 1982	17 July 1984	Mahathir Mohamad (II)
James Peter Ongkili (1939–2006); MP for Tuaran		BN (BERJAYA)		17 July 1984	10 August 1986	Mahathir Mohamad (II)
Mohd Khalil Yaakob (b. 1937); MP for Maran		BN (UMNO)		17 July 1984	10 August 1986	Mahathir Mohamad (II)
Abdul Ajib Ahmad (1947–2011); MP for Mersing		BN (UMNO)		11 August 1986	7 May 1987	Mahathir Mohamad (III)
Kasitah Gaddam (b. unknown); MP for Kinabalu		BN (USNO)		11 August 1986	20 May 1987	Mahathir Mohamad (III)
Mohamed Yusof Mohamed Noor (b. unknown); MP for Setiu		BN (UMNO)		20 May 1987	26 October 1990	Mahathir Mohamad (III)
Sulaiman Daud (1933–2010); MP for Santubong		BN (PBB)		20 May 1987	26 October 1990	Mahathir Mohamad (III)
Abang Abu Bakar Abang Mustapha (1941–2023); MP for Kuala Rajang		BN (PBB)		27 October 1990	7 January 1999	
Syed Hamid Albar (b. 1944); MP for Kota Tinggi		BN (UMNO)		26 October 1990	7 May 1995	
Bernard Giluk Dompok (b. 1949); MP for Penampang		BN (UPKO)		21 August 1994	7 May 1995	
Abdul Hamid Othman (b. unknown); MP for Sik		BN (UMNO)		8 May 1995	14 December 1999	
Chong Kah Kiat (b. 1948); Senator		BN (LDP)		8 May 1995	12 November 1996	
Siti Zaharah Sulaiman (1949–2024); MP for Paya Besar		BN (UMNO)		12 November 1996	13 December 1999	
Tajol Rosli Mohd Ghazali (b. 1944); MP for Gerik		BN (UMNO)		7 January 1999	14 December 1999	
Rais Yatim (b. 1942); MP for Jelebu		BN (UMNO)	Legal Affairs Department (BHEUU)	15 December 1999	2 November 2003	Mahathir Mohamad (VI)
Rais Yatim (b. 1942); MP for Jelebu		BN (UMNO)	Legal Aid Bureau (BBG)	15 December 1999	2 November 2003	Mahathir Mohamad (VI)
Rais Yatim (b. 1942); MP for Jelebu		BN (UMNO)	Malaysia Department of Insolvency (MdI)	15 December 1999	2 November 2003	Mahathir Mohamad (VI)
Bernard Giluk Dompok (b. 1949); MP for Kinabalu		BN (UPKO)		15 December 1999	2 November 2003	Mahathir Mohamad (VI)
Abdul Hamid Othman (1939–2011); Senator		BN (UMNO)		15 December 1999	17 January 2001	Mahathir Mohamad (VI)
Pandikar Amin Mulia (b. 1953); Senator		BN (AKAR)		15 December 1999	21 November 2002	Mahathir Mohamad (VI)
Abdul Hamid Zainal Abidin (1944–2014); Senator		BN (UMNO)		17 January 2001	2 November 2003	Mahathir Mohamad (VI)
Tengku Adnan Tengku Mansor (b. 1950); Senator		BN (UMNO)		21 November 2002	2 November 2003	Mahathir Mohamad (VI)
Rais Yatim (b. 1942); MP for Jelebu		BN (UMNO)	Legal Affairs Department (BHEUU)	3 November 2003	26 March 2004	Abdullah Ahmad Badawi
Rais Yatim (b. 1942); MP for Jelebu		BN (UMNO)	Legal Aid Bureau (BBG)	3 November 2003	26 March 2004	Abdullah Ahmad Badawi
Rais Yatim (b. 1942); MP for Jelebu		BN (UMNO)	Malaysia Department of Insolvency (MdI)	3 November 2003	26 March 2004	Abdullah Ahmad Badawi
Bernard Giluk Dompok (b. 1949); MP for Kinabalu (2003–2004); MP for Ranau (2004–2008); MP for Penampang (2008–2009)		BN (UPKO)		3 November 2003	9 April 2009	Abdullah Ahmad Badawi
Abdul Hamid Zainal Abidin (1944–2014); Senator		BN (UMNO)	Religious Affairs	3 November 2003	26 March 2004	Abdullah Ahmad Badawi
Tengku Adnan Tengku Mansor (b. 1950); Senator		BN (UMNO)		3 November 2003	26 March 2004	Abdullah Ahmad Badawi
Mustapa Mohamed (b. 1950); MP for Jeli		BN (UMNO)	Economy	27 March 2004	14 February 2006	Abdullah Ahmad Badawi
Mohd Radzi Sheikh Ahmad (b. 1942); MP for Kangar		BN (UMNO)	Legal Affairs Department (BHEUU)	27 March 2004	14 February 2006	Abdullah Ahmad Badawi
Mohd Radzi Sheikh Ahmad (b. 1942); MP for Kangar		BN (UMNO)	Legal Aid Bureau (BBG)	27 March 2004	14 February 2006	Abdullah Ahmad Badawi
Mohd Radzi Sheikh Ahmad (b. 1942); MP for Kangar		BN (UMNO)	Malaysia Department of Insolvency (MdI)	27 March 2004	14 February 2006	Abdullah Ahmad Badawi
Maximus Ongkili (b. 1953); MP for Kota Marudu		BN (PBS)	National Unity	27 March 2004	18 March 2008	Abdullah Ahmad Badawi
Abdullah Md Zin (b. 1946); MP for Besut		BN (UMNO)	Religious Affairs	27 March 2004	18 March 2008	Abdullah Ahmad Badawi
Mohamed Nazri Abdul Aziz (b. 1954); MP for Padang Rengas		BN (UMNO)	Legal Affairs Division (BHEUU)	27 March 2004	9 April 2009	Abdullah Ahmad Badawi
Mohamed Nazri Abdul Aziz (b. 1954); MP for Padang Rengas		BN (UMNO)	Legal Aid Department (JBG)	27 March 2004	9 April 2009	Abdullah Ahmad Badawi
Mohamed Nazri Abdul Aziz (b. 1954); MP for Padang Rengas		BN (UMNO)	Malaysia Department of Insolvency (MdI)	27 March 2004	9 April 2009	Abdullah Ahmad Badawi
Mohd Effendi Norwawi (b. 1948); Senator		BN (PBB)	Economic Planning Unit (EPU)	14 February 2006	18 March 2008	Abdullah Ahmad Badawi
Zaid Ibrahim (b. 1951); Senator		BN (UMNO)	Legal Affairs Division	19 March 2008	17 September 2008	Abdullah Ahmad Badawi
Zaid Ibrahim (b. 1951); Senator		BN (UMNO)	Legal Aid Bureau (BBG)	19 March 2008	17 September 2008	Abdullah Ahmad Badawi
Zaid Ibrahim (b. 1951); Senator		BN (UMNO)	Malaysia Department of Insolvency (MdI)	19 March 2008	17 September 2008	Abdullah Ahmad Badawi
Amirsham Abdul Aziz (b. 1950); Senator		BN (UMNO)	Economic Planning Unit (EPU)	19 March 2008	9 April 2009	Abdullah Ahmad Badawi
Amirsham Abdul Aziz (b. 1950); Senator		BN (UMNO)	Department of Statistics Malaysia (DOSM)	19 March 2008	9 April 2009	Abdullah Ahmad Badawi
Ahmad Zahid Hamidi (b. 1953); MP for Bagan Datok		BN (UMNO)	Religious Affairs	19 March 2008	9 April 2009	Abdullah Ahmad Badawi
Mohamed Nazri Abdul Aziz (b. 1954); MP for Padang Rengas		BN (UMNO)	Legal Affairs Division (BHEUU)	10 April 2009	15 May 2013	Najib Razak
Mohamed Nazri Abdul Aziz (b. 1954); MP for Padang Rengas		BN (UMNO)	Legal Aid Department (JBG)	10 April 2009	15 May 2013	Najib Razak
Mohamed Nazri Abdul Aziz (b. 1954); MP for Padang Rengas		BN (UMNO)	Malaysia Department of Insolvency (MdI)	10 April 2009	15 May 2013	Najib Razak
Nor Mohamed Yakcop (b. 1947); MP for Tasek Gelugor		BN (UMNO)	Economic Planning Unit (EPU)	10 April 2009	15 May 2013	Najib Razak
Nor Mohamed Yakcop (b. 1947); MP for Tasek Gelugor		BN (UMNO)	Public Private Partnership Unit (UKAS)	10 April 2009	15 May 2013	Najib Razak
Koh Tsu Koon (b. 1949); Senator		BN (Gerakan)	Performance Management and Delivery Unit (PEMANDU)	10 April 2009	15 May 2013	Najib Razak
Koh Tsu Koon (b. 1949); Senator		BN (Gerakan)	Government Transformation Programme (GTP)	10 April 2009	15 May 2013	Najib Razak
Koh Tsu Koon (b. 1949); Senator		BN (Gerakan)	Key Performance Indicators (KPIs)	10 April 2009	15 May 2013	Najib Razak
Jamil Khir Baharom (b. 1970); Senator (2009–2013); MP for Jerai (2013–2018)		BN (UMNO)	Syariah Judiciary Department Malaysia (JKSM)	10 April 2009	9 May 2018	Najib Razak
Jamil Khir Baharom (b. 1970); Senator (2009–2013); MP for Jerai (2013–2018)		BN (UMNO)	Pilgrimage Fund Board (LTH)	10 April 2009	9 May 2018	Najib Razak
Jamil Khir Baharom (b. 1970); Senator (2009–2013); MP for Jerai (2013–2018)		BN (UMNO)	Malaysia Department of Islamic Development (JAKIM)	10 April 2009	9 May 2018	Najib Razak
Jamil Khir Baharom (b. 1970); Senator (2009–2013); MP for Jerai (2013–2018)		BN (UMNO)	Federal Territory Islamic Religious Council (MAIWP)	10 April 2009	9 May 2018	Najib Razak
Jamil Khir Baharom (b. 1970); Senator (2009–2013); MP for Jerai (2013–2018)		BN (UMNO)	Department of Federal Territory Islamic Affairs (JAWI)	10 April 2009	9 May 2018	Najib Razak
Jamil Khir Baharom (b. 1970); Senator (2009–2013); MP for Jerai (2013–2018)		BN (UMNO)	Federal Territory Syariah Court (MSWP)	10 April 2009	9 May 2018	Najib Razak
Jamil Khir Baharom (b. 1970); Senator (2009–2013); MP for Jerai (2013–2018)		BN (UMNO)	Department of Awqaf, Zakat and Haji (JAWHAR)	10 April 2009	9 May 2018	Najib Razak
Jamil Khir Baharom (b. 1970); Senator (2009–2013); MP for Jerai (2013–2018)		BN (UMNO)	Islamic Dakwah Foundation of Malaysia (YADIM)	10 April 2009	9 May 2018	Najib Razak
Jamil Khir Baharom (b. 1970); Senator (2009–2013); MP for Jerai (2013–2018)		BN (UMNO)	Malaysian Islamic Economic Development Foundation (YaPEIM)	10 April 2009	9 May 2018	Najib Razak
Jamil Khir Baharom (b. 1970); Senator (2009–2013); MP for Jerai (2013–2018)		BN (UMNO)	Malaysian Awqaf Foundation (YWM)	10 April 2009	9 May 2018	Najib Razak
Idris Jala (b. 1958); Senator		Independent	Performance Management and Delivery Unit (PEMANDU)	1 September 2009	2 September 2015	Najib Razak
Joseph Kurup (1944–2024); MP for Pensiangan		BN (PBRS)	Department of National Unity and Integration (JPNIN)	16 May 2013	9 May 2018	Najib Razak
Joseph Entulu Belaun (b. 1954); MP for Selangau		BN (PRS)	Malaysia Administrative Modernisation and Management Planning Unit (MAMPU)	16 May 2013	9 May 2018	Najib Razak
Joseph Entulu Belaun (b. 1954); MP for Selangau		BN (PRS)	Public Services Commission of Malaysia (PSC)	16 May 2013	2015	Najib Razak
Joseph Entulu Belaun (b. 1954); MP for Selangau		BN (PRS)	Education Services Commission	16 May 2013	2015	Najib Razak
Shahidan Kassim (b. 1951); MP for Arau		BN (UMNO)	Malaysian Maritime Enforcement Agency (APMM)	16 May 2013	9 May 2018	Najib Razak
Shahidan Kassim (b. 1951); MP for Arau		BN (UMNO)	Malaysian Maritime Enforcement Affairs Division (BHEPMM)	16 May 2013	9 May 2018	Najib Razak
Shahidan Kassim (b. 1951); MP for Arau		BN (UMNO)	National Security Council (MKN)	16 May 2013	9 May 2018	Najib Razak
Shahidan Kassim (b. 1951); MP for Arau		BN (UMNO)	PR1MA Corporation Malaysia (PR1MA)	16 May 2013	9 May 2018	Najib Razak
Shahidan Kassim (b. 1951); MP for Arau		BN (UMNO)	Eastern Sabah Security Command (ESSCOM)	16 May 2013	9 May 2018	Najib Razak
Shahidan Kassim (b. 1951); MP for Arau		BN (UMNO)	Parliament of Malaysia	16 May 2013	2015	Najib Razak
Shahidan Kassim (b. 1951); MP for Arau		BN (UMNO)	National Disaster Management Agency	16 May 2013	2015	Najib Razak
Nancy Shukri (b. 1961); MP for Batang Sadong		BN (PBB)	Legal Affairs Division (BHEUU)	16 May 2013	27 June 2016	Najib Razak
Nancy Shukri (b. 1961); MP for Batang Sadong		BN (PBB)	Legal Aid Department (JBG)	16 May 2013	27 June 2016	Najib Razak
Nancy Shukri (b. 1961); MP for Batang Sadong		BN (PBB)	Malaysia Department of Insolvency (MdI)	16 May 2013	27 June 2016	Najib Razak
Nancy Shukri (b. 1961); MP for Batang Sadong		BN (PBB)	Amanah Raya Berhad	16 May 2013	27 June 2016	Najib Razak
Nancy Shukri (b. 1961); MP for Batang Sadong		BN (PBB)	Advisory Board (LP)	16 May 2013	27 June 2016	Najib Razak
Nancy Shukri (b. 1961); MP for Batang Sadong		BN (PBB)	Human Rights Commission of Malaysia (HRC)	16 May 2013	27 June 2016	Najib Razak
Nancy Shukri (b. 1961); MP for Batang Sadong		BN (PBB)	The Judicial and Legal Service Commission (SPKP)	16 May 2013	27 June 2016	Najib Razak
Nancy Shukri (b. 1961); MP for Batang Sadong		BN (PBB)	Kuala Lumpur Regional Centre for Arbitration (KLRCA)	16 May 2013	27 June 2016	Najib Razak
Nancy Shukri (b. 1961); MP for Batang Sadong		BN (PBB)	Office of the Chief Registrar Federal Court of Malaysia	16 May 2013	27 June 2016	Najib Razak
Nancy Shukri (b. 1961); MP for Batang Sadong		BN (PBB)	National Legal Aid Foundation	16 May 2013	27 June 2016	Najib Razak
Nancy Shukri (b. 1961); MP for Batang Sadong		BN (PBB)	Judicial and Legal Training Institute (ILKAP)	16 May 2013	27 June 2016	Najib Razak
Nancy Shukri (b. 1961); MP for Batang Sadong		BN (PBB)	Attorney General's Chambers	16 May 2013	27 June 2016	Najib Razak
Nancy Shukri (b. 1961); MP for Batang Sadong		BN (PBB)	Protection Division (UPS)	16 May 2013	27 June 2016	Najib Razak
Nancy Shukri (b. 1961); MP for Batang Sadong		BN (PBB)	Judicial Appointments Commission (JAC)	16 May 2013	27 June 2016	Najib Razak
Nancy Shukri (b. 1961); MP for Batang Sadong		BN (PBB)	Pardon Board	16 May 2013	27 June 2016	Najib Razak
Nancy Shukri (b. 1961); MP for Batang Sadong		BN (PBB)	States Pardon Board	16 May 2013	27 June 2016	Najib Razak
Nancy Shukri (b. 1961); MP for Batang Sadong		BN (PBB)	Public Land Transport Commission (SPAD)	16 May 2013	9 May 2018	Najib Razak
Nancy Shukri (b. 1961); MP for Batang Sadong		BN (PBB)	Commercial Vehicle Licensing Board (CVLB) Sabah	16 May 2013	9 May 2018	Najib Razak
Nancy Shukri (b. 1961); MP for Batang Sadong		BN (PBB)	Commercial Vehicle Licensing Board (CVLB) Sarawak	16 May 2013	9 May 2018	Najib Razak
Nancy Shukri (b. 1961); MP for Batang Sadong		BN (PBB)	Malaysian Innovation Agency	28 June 2016	9 May 2018	Najib Razak
Nancy Shukri (b. 1961); MP for Batang Sadong		BN (PBB)	Malaysia Nuclear Power Corporation (MNPC)	28 June 2016	9 May 2018	Najib Razak
Nancy Shukri (b. 1961); MP for Batang Sadong		BN (PBB)	Malaysian Industry Government Group for High Technology (MiGHT)	28 June 2016	9 May 2018	Najib Razak
Paul Low Seng Kuan (b. 1967); Senator		Independent	Public Complaints Bureau (PCB)	16 May 2013	9 May 2018	Najib Razak
Paul Low Seng Kuan (b. 1967); Senator		Independent	National Institute of Public Administration (INTAN)	16 May 2013	9 May 2018	Najib Razak
Abdul Wahid Omar (b. 1964); Senator		Independent	Economic Planning Unit (EPU)	5 June 2013	4 June 2016	Najib Razak
Abdul Wahid Omar (b. 1964); Senator		Independent	Public Private Partnership Unit (UKAS)	5 June 2013	4 June 2016	Najib Razak
Abdul Wahid Omar (b. 1964); Senator		Independent	Bumiputera Education Steering Foundation (YPPB)	5 June 2013	4 June 2016	Najib Razak
Abdul Wahid Omar (b. 1964); Senator		Independent	Bumiputera Agenda Steering Unit (TERAJU)	5 June 2013	4 June 2016	Najib Razak
Abdul Wahid Omar (b. 1964); Senator		Independent	Special Unit Program for Socioeconomic Development of Indian Community (SEDIC)	5 June 2013	4 June 2016	Najib Razak
Abdul Wahid Omar (b. 1964); Senator		Independent	Special Implementation Task Force on the Indian Community (SITF)	5 June 2013	4 June 2016	Najib Razak
Wee Ka Siong (b. 1968); MP for Ayer Hitam		BN (MCA)	SME and Micro Credit Development Unit (SAME)	27 June 2014	9 May 2018	Najib Razak
Wee Ka Siong (b. 1968); MP for Ayer Hitam		BN (MCA)	New Villages in Peninsular Malaysia Division	27 June 2014	9 May 2018	Najib Razak
Mah Siew Keong (b. 1961); MP for Telok Intan		BN (Gerakan)	Special Innovation Unit (UNIK)	27 June 2014	27 June 2016	Najib Razak
Mah Siew Keong (b. 1961); MP for Telok Intan		BN (Gerakan)	Malaysian Industry-Government Group for High Technology (MiGHT)	27 June 2014	27 June 2016	Najib Razak
Mah Siew Keong (b. 1961); MP for Telok Intan		BN (Gerakan)	Malaysia Nuclear Power Corporation (MNPC)	27 June 2014	27 June 2016	Najib Razak
Mah Siew Keong (b. 1961); MP for Telok Intan		BN (Gerakan)	Hindu Endowments Board	27 June 2014	27 June 2016	Najib Razak
Mah Siew Keong (b. 1961); MP for Telok Intan		BN (Gerakan)	1Malaysia Hawkers and Petty Traders Foundation (YPPKM)	27 June 2014	27 June 2016	Najib Razak
Azalina Othman Said (b. 1963); MP for Pengerang		BN (UMNO)	Parliament of Malaysia	29 July 2015	9 May 2018	Najib Razak
Azalina Othman Said (b. 1963); MP for Pengerang		BN (UMNO)	Public Services Commission of Malaysia (PSC)	29 July 2015	9 May 2018	Najib Razak
Azalina Othman Said (b. 1963); MP for Pengerang		BN (UMNO)	Election Commission of Malaysia (EC)	29 July 2015	9 May 2018	Najib Razak
Azalina Othman Said (b. 1963); MP for Pengerang		BN (UMNO)	Implementation Coordination Unit (ICU)	29 July 2015	9 May 2018	Najib Razak
Azalina Othman Said (b. 1963); MP for Pengerang		BN (UMNO)	Prime Minister's Office (PMO)	29 July 2015	9 May 2018	Najib Razak
Azalina Othman Said (b. 1963); MP for Pengerang		BN (UMNO)	Cabinet, Constitution and Inter-Government Relation Division (BKPP)	29 July 2015	9 May 2018	Najib Razak
Azalina Othman Said (b. 1963); MP for Pengerang		BN (UMNO)	Legal Affairs Division (BHEUU)	28 June 2016	9 May 2018	Najib Razak
Azalina Othman Said (b. 1963); MP for Pengerang		BN (UMNO)	Legal Aid Department (JBG)	28 June 2016	9 May 2018	Najib Razak
Azalina Othman Said (b. 1963); MP for Pengerang		BN (UMNO)	Malaysia Department of Insolvency (MdI)	28 June 2016	9 May 2018	Najib Razak
Azalina Othman Said (b. 1963); MP for Pengerang		BN (UMNO)	Amanah Raya Berhad	28 June 2016	9 May 2018	Najib Razak
Azalina Othman Said (b. 1963); MP for Pengerang		BN (UMNO)	Advisory Board (LP)	28 June 2016	9 May 2018	Najib Razak
Azalina Othman Said (b. 1963); MP for Pengerang		BN (UMNO)	Human Rights Commission of Malaysia (HRC)	28 June 2016	9 May 2018	Najib Razak
Azalina Othman Said (b. 1963); MP for Pengerang		BN (UMNO)	The Judicial and Legal Service Commission (SPKP)	28 June 2016	9 May 2018	Najib Razak
Azalina Othman Said (b. 1963); MP for Pengerang		BN (UMNO)	Kuala Lumpur Regional Centre for Arbitration (KLRCA)	28 June 2016	9 May 2018	Najib Razak
Azalina Othman Said (b. 1963); MP for Pengerang		BN (UMNO)	Office of the Chief Registrar Federal Court of Malaysia	28 June 2016	9 May 2018	Najib Razak
Azalina Othman Said (b. 1963); MP for Pengerang		BN (UMNO)	National Legal Aid Foundation	28 June 2016	9 May 2018	Najib Razak
Azalina Othman Said (b. 1963); MP for Pengerang		BN (UMNO)	Judicial and Legal Training Institute (ILKAP)	28 June 2016	9 May 2018	Najib Razak
Azalina Othman Said (b. 1963); MP for Pengerang		BN (UMNO)	Attorney General's Chambers	28 June 2016	9 May 2018	Najib Razak
Azalina Othman Said (b. 1963); MP for Pengerang		BN (UMNO)	Protection Division (UPS)	28 June 2016	9 May 2018	Najib Razak
Azalina Othman Said (b. 1963); MP for Pengerang		BN (UMNO)	Judicial Appointments Commission (JAC)	28 June 2016	9 May 2018	Najib Razak
Azalina Othman Said (b. 1963); MP for Pengerang		BN (UMNO)	Pardon Board	28 June 2016	9 May 2018	Najib Razak
Azalina Othman Said (b. 1963); MP for Pengerang		BN (UMNO)	States Pardon Board	28 June 2016	9 May 2018	Najib Razak
Abdul Rahman Dahlan (b. 1965); MP for Kota Belud		BN (UMNO)	Economic Planning Unit (EPU)	27 June 2016	9 May 2018	Najib Razak
Hishammuddin Hussein (b. 1961); MP for Sembrong		BN (UMNO)	Special Functions	12 April 2017	9 May 2018	Najib Razak
Dr. Mujahid Yusof Rawa (b. 1964); MP for Parit Buntar		PH (AMANAH)	Religious Affairs	2 July 2018	24 February 2020	Mahathir Mohamad (VII)
Liew Vui Keong (1960–2020); MP for Batu Sapi		WARISAN	Legal Affairs	2 July 2018	24 February 2020	Mahathir Mohamad (VII)
Waytha Moorthy Ponnusamy (b. 1966); Senator		HINDRAF	National Unity and Social Wellbeing	17 July 2018	24 February 2020	Mahathir Mohamad (VII)
Waytha Moorthy Ponnusamy (b. 1966); Senator		MAP	National Unity and Social Wellbeing	17 July 2018	24 February 2020	Mahathir Mohamad (VII)
Mustapa Mohamed (b. 1950); MP for Jeli		PN (BERSATU)	Economy	10 March 2020	16 August 2021	Muhyiddin Yassin (I)
Mohd. Redzuan Md. Yusof (b. 1957); MP for Alor Gajah		PN (BERSATU)	Special Functions	10 March 2020	16 August 2021	Muhyiddin Yassin (I)
Takiyuddin Hassan (b. 1961); MP for Kota Bharu		PN (PAS)	Parliament and Law	10 March 2020	16 August 2021	Muhyiddin Yassin (I)
Dr. Zulkifli Mohamad Al-Bakri (b. 1969); Senator		Independent	Religious Affairs	10 March 2020	16 August 2021	Muhyiddin Yassin (I)
Dr. Maximus Johnity Ongkili (b. 1953); MP for Kota Marudu		PBS	Sabah and Sarawak Affairs	10 March 2020	16 August 2021	Muhyiddin Yassin (I)
Mustapa Mohamed (b. 1950); MP for Jeli		PN (BERSATU)	Economy	30 August 2021	24 November 2022	Ismail Sabri Yaakob (I)
Abdul Latiff Ahmad (b. 1957); MP for Mersing		PN (BERSATU)	Special Functions	30 August 2021	24 November 2022	Ismail Sabri Yaakob (I)
Idris Ahmad (b. 1969); Senator		PN (PAS)	Religious Affairs	30 August 2021	24 November 2022	Ismail Sabri Yaakob (I)
Wan Junaidi Tuanku Jaafar (b. 1946); MP for Santubong		GPS (PBB)	Parliament and Law	30 August 2021	24 November 2022	Ismail Sabri Yaakob (I)
Dr. Maximus Johnity Ongkili (b. 1953); MP for Kota Marudu		PBS	Sabah and Sarawak Affairs	30 August 2021	24 November 2022	Ismail Sabri Yaakob (I)
Azalina Othman Said (b. 1963); MP for Pengerang		BN (UMNO)	Law and Institutional Reform	3 December 2022	Incumbent	Anwar Ibrahim (I)
Armizan Mohd Ali (b. 1976); MP for Papar		GRS (Direct Member)	Sabah and Sarawak Affairs and Special Duties	3 December 2022	12 December 2023	Anwar Ibrahim (I)
Mohd Naim Mokhtar (b. 1967); Senator		Independent	Religious Affairs	3 December 2022	17 December 2025	Anwar Ibrahim (I)
Dr. Zaliha Mustafa (b. 1964); MP for Sekijang		PH (PKR)	Federal Territories	12 December 2023	17 December 2025	Anwar Ibrahim (I)
Zulkifli Hasan (b.1977); Senator		Independent	Religious Affairs	17 December 2025	Incumbent	Anwar Ibrahim (I)
Hannah Yeoh Tseow Suan (b.1979); MP for Segambut		PH (DAP)	Federal Territories	17 December 2025	Incumbent	Anwar Ibrahim (I)
Mustapha Sakmud (b. 1968); MP for Sepanggar		PH (PKR)	Sabah and Sarawak Affairs	17 December 2025	Incumbent	Anwar Ibrahim (I)
