= Igan (federal constituency) =

Federal constituency of Sarawak, Malaysia

Igan (P207)
Sarawak constituency

Federal constituency
- Legislature: Dewan Rakyat
- MP: Ahmad Johnie Zawawi; GPS
- Constituency created: 2005
- First contested: 2008
- Last contested: 2022

Demographics
- Population (2020): 27,388
- Electors (2022): 28,290
- Area (km²): 2,206
- Pop. density (per km²): 12.4

Igan is a federal constituency in Mukah Division (Daro District & Matu District), Sarikei Division (Meradong District) and Sibu Division (Sibu District), Sarawak, Malaysia, that has been represented in the Dewan Rakyat since 2008.

The federal constituency was created in the 2005 redistribution and is mandated to return a single member to the Dewan Rakyat under the first past the post voting system.

== Demographics ==
https://ge15.orientaldaily.com.my/seats/sarawak/p

Ethnic breakdown of Igan's electorate as of 2022
1. Sarawak bumiputera (60.7%)
2. Malay-Muslim bumiputera (35.6%)
3. Chinese (3.30%)
4. Other ethnicities (0.40%)

As of 2020, Igan has a population of 27,388 people.

Age breakdown of Igan's electorate as of 2022
1. 18-20 (6.68%)
2. 21-29 (23.0%)
3. 30-39 (21.8%)
4. 40-49 (16.0%)
5. 50-59 (15.4%)
6. 60-69 (10.5%)
7. 70-79 (5.08%)
8. 80-89 (1.30%)
9. above 90 (0.31%)
Gender breakdown of Igan's electorate as of 2022
1. Male (49.4%)
2. Female (50.6%)

== History ==
=== Polling districts ===
According to the gazette issued on 31 October 2022, the Igan constituency has a total of 16 polling districts.

State constituency	Polling Districts	Code	Location
Daro (N43）	Semah	207/43/01	RH Magerat Ak Rentap; SK Ng. Semah; SK Sebena; SK Penasu
Daro (N43）	Tebaang	207/43/02	SK Campuran Daro; SK Kpg. Tebaang
Daro (N43）	Daro	207/43/03	SK Kpg. Nangar; SK Hijrah Badong; Tadika Kie Ming Daro
Daro (N43）	Lemang Peh	207/43/04	SK Ulu Daro; SK Kpg. Pabgtray Daro
Daro (N43）	Lassa	207/43/05	SK Sg. Lengan; SK Sg. Singat; SK Sawai; SK Sg. Pasin; SK Batang Lassa
Daro (N43）	Lebaan	207/43/06	SK Bukit Papit
Jemoreng (N44)	Kuala Matu	207/44/01	SK Bruan Mapal; SK Kuala Matu; SK Kpg. Pergau
Jemoreng (N44)	Sok	207/44/02	SK Sok
Jemoreng (N44)	Matu	207/44/03	Perpustakaan Majlis Daerah Matu-Daro
Jemoreng (N44)	Sekaan Besar	207/44/04	Bangunan Pusat Sumber JKKK Kpg. Tering; SK Orang Kaya Selair Kpg. Sekaan
Jemoreng (N44)	Jemoreng	207/44/05	SK Orang Kaya Sergunim Jemoreng
Jemoreng (N44)	Bawang	207/44/06	SK Sekaan Kechil; Dewan Kpg Bawang
Jemoreng (N44)	Tian	207/44/07	SK Bawang Tian
Jemoreng (N44)	Bekumah	207/44/08	SK Kampung Kebuaw
Jemoreng (N44)	Ilas	207/44/09	SK Sg. Ilas
Jemoreng (N44)	Igan	207/44/10	SK Kpg. Igan

=== Representation history ===
Members of Parliament for Igan
Parliament	No	Years	Member	Party	Vote Share
Constituency created from Kuala Rajang and Mukah
12th	P207	2008-2013	Wahab Dolah (وهب دولة)	BN (PBB)	Uncontested
13th	P207	2013-2018	Wahab Dolah (وهب دولة)	BN (PBB)	11,896; 87.19%
14th	P207	2018	Ahmad Johnie Zawawi (احمد جوهني زواوي)	BN (PBB)	10,538; 83.76%
14th	P207	2018-2022	Ahmad Johnie Zawawi (احمد جوهني زواوي)	GPS (PBB)	10,538; 83.76%
15th	P207	2022–present	Ahmad Johnie Zawawi (احمد جوهني زواوي)	GPS (PBB)	15,824; 93.16%

=== State constituency ===
Parliamentary constituency	State constituency					
Parliamentary constituency	1969–1978	1978–1990	1990–1999	1999–2008	2008–2016	2016−present
Igan					Daro	
Igan					Jemoreng	

=== Historical boundaries ===
Parliamentary constituency	Area	
Parliamentary constituency	2005	2015
Daro	Daro; Lassa; Lebaan; Semaah; Tabaang	
Jemoreng	Bawang; Igan; Jemoreng; Matu; Sok	

=== Current state assembly members ===
No.	State Constituency	Member	Party (coalition)
N43	Daro	Safiee Ahmad	GPS (PBB)
N44	Jemoreng	Juanda Jaya	GPS (PBB)

=== Local governments & postcodes ===
No.	State Constituency	Local Government	Postcode
N43	Daro	Maradong & Julau District Council (Lebaan area); Matu & Daro District Council; Sibu Rural District Council (Lassa area)	96200 Daro; 96250 Matu
N44	Jemoreng	Matu & Daro District Council	96200 Daro; 96250 Matu

== Election results ==
Malaysian general election, 2022
Party	Candidate	Votes	%	∆%
GPS	Ahmad Johnie Zawawi	15,824	93.16	▲93.16
PH	Andri Zulkarnaen Hamden	1,162	6.84	▲6.84
Total valid votes		16,986	100.00	
Total rejected ballots		234		
Unreturned ballots		66		
Turnout		17,286	61.10	▼5.23
Registered electors		28,290		
Majority		14,662	86.32	▲18.80
GPS gain from BN		Swing		?
Source(s) https://lom.agc.gov.my/ilims/upload/portal/akta/outputp/1753265/PARLIMEN%20SARAWAK%20(PUB%20620).pdf

Malaysian general election, 2018
Party	Candidate	Votes	%	∆%
BN	Ahmad Johnie Zawawi	10,538	83.76	▼3.43
PKR	Andri Zulkarnaen Hamden	2,043	16.24	▲16.24
Total valid votes		12,581	100.00	
Total rejected ballots		317		
Unreturned ballots		98		
Turnout		12,996	66.33	▼11.88
Registered electors		19,592		
Majority		8,495	67.52	▼6.86
BN hold		Swing		
Source(s) "His Majesty's Government Gazette - Notice of Contested Election, Parliament for the State of Sarawak [P.U. (B) 247/2018]" (PDF). Attorney General's Chambers of Malaysia. 3 May 2018. "Federal Government Gazette - Results of Contested Election and Statements of the Poll after the Official Addition of Votes, Parliamentary Constituencies for the State of Sarawak [P.U. (B) 321/2018]" (PDF). Attorney General's Chambers of Malaysia. 28 May 2018. Archived from the original (PDF) on 2019-12-29.

Malaysian general election, 2013
Party	Candidate	Votes	%	∆%
BN	Wahab Dolah	11,896	87.19	▲87.19
PAS	Ajiji Fauzan	1,747	12.81	▲12.81
Total valid votes		13,643	100.00	
Total rejected ballots		222		
Unreturned ballots		33		
Turnout		13,898	78.21	
Registered electors		17,771		
Majority		10,149	74.38	
BN hold		Swing		
Source(s) "Federal Government Gazette - Notice of Contested Election, Parliament for the State of Sarawak [P.U. (B) 184/2013]" (PDF). Attorney General's Chambers of Malaysia. 26 April 2013. Archived from the original (PDF) on 2018-09-30. "Federal Government Gazette - Results of Contested Election and Statements of the Poll after the Official Addition of Votes, Parliamentary Constituencies for the State of Sarawak [P.U. (B) 225/2013]" (PDF). Attorney General's Chambers of Malaysia. 22 May 2013. Archived from the original (PDF) on 2018-09-30.

Malaysian general election, 2008
Party	Candidate	Votes	%
On the nomination day, Wahab Dolah won uncontested.
BN	Wahab Dolah		
Total valid votes			100.00
Total rejected ballots			
Unreturned ballots			
Turnout			
Registered electors			
Majority			
This was a new constituency created.
