= Amran Ab Ghani =

Malaysian politician (born 1973)

- عمران عبدالغني

Member of the Malaysian Parliament for Tanah Merah
- In office 8 March 2008 – 5 May 2013
- Preceded by: Shaari Hassan (BN–UMNO)
- Succeeded by: Ikmal Hisham Abdul Aziz (BN–UMNO)
- Majority: 1,584 (2008)

Personal details
- Born: 12 August 1973 (age 52) Kelantan, Malaysia
- Party: People's Justice Party (PKR) (until 2020); Malaysian United Indigenous Party (BERSATU) (since 2020)
- Other political affiliations: Pakatan Rakyat (PR) (2008–2015); Pakatan Harapan (PH) (2015–2020); Perikatan Nasional (PN) (since 2020)
- Occupation: Politician

Amran bin Ab Ghani (born 12 August 1973) is a Malaysian politician, and a former Member of the Parliament of Malaysia for the Tanah Merah constituency in Kelantan from 2008 to 2013, sitting as a member of the People's Justice Party (PKR) in the Pakatan Rakyat opposition coalition.

Amran was elected to the Tanah Merah seat in the 2008 election, defeating the incumbent Shaari Hassan of the ruling Barisan Nasional coalition. Shaari alleged that members of UMNO (his own party) sabotaged his campaign. Amran did not recontest the seat in the 2013 election. Instead, he shifted to the state of KG Sat to contest the State Assembly seat of Paloh, losing to UMNO's long-serving incumbent Norzula Mat Diah. Some local PKR members objected to Amran being parachuted into the state as a candidate and publicly supported Norzula instead.

== Election results ==
Parliament of Malaysia
Year	Constituency	Candidate	Votes	Pct	Opponent(s)	Votes	Pct	Ballots cast	Majority	Turnout
2008	P027 Tanah Merah	Amran Ab Ghani (PKR)	17,554	50.20%	Shaari Hassan (UMNO)	15,970	45.68%	36,126	1,584	81.46%
2008	P027 Tanah Merah	Amran Ab Ghani (PKR)	17,554	50.20%	Asmadi Abu Bakar (IND)	1,439	4.12%	36,126	1,584	81.46%

Kelantan State Legislative Assembly
Year	Constituency	Candidate	Votes	Pct	Opponent(s)	Votes	Pct	Ballots cast	Majority	Turnout
2013	N44 Paloh	Amran Ab Ghani (PKR)	3,910	33.26%	Norzula Mat Diah (UMNO)	7,847	66.74%	12,032	3,937	88.20%
