= Ahmad Johnie Zawawi =

Malaysian politician

Yang Berhormat Tuan Ahmad Johnie Zawawi JBS KMN MP
- أحمد جوهني زواوي
- Ahmad Johnie in 2026

Chairman of Indah Water
- Incumbent
- Assumed office 17 May 2020
- Minister: Tengku Zafrul Aziz (2020–2022); Anwar Ibrahim (since 2022); Amir Hamzah Azizan (Minister II, since 2023)
- Chief Executive Officer: Narendran Maniam
- Preceded by: Amiruddin Abd Aziz

Member of the Malaysian Parliament for Igan
- Incumbent
- Assumed office 9 May 2018
- Preceded by: Wahab Dolah (BN–PBB)
- Majority: 8,495 (2018); 14,662 (2022)

Faction represented in Dewan Rakyat
- 2018: Barisan Nasional
- 2018–: Gabungan Parti Sarawak

Personal details
- Born: Ahmad Johnie Zawawi; 1 June 1963 (age 63) Daro, Mukah, Crown Colony of Sarawak (now Sarawak, Malaysia)
- Party: Parti Pesaka Bumiputera Bersatu (PBB)
- Other political affiliations: Barisan Nasional (BN) (–2018); Gabungan Parti Sarawak (GPS) (since 2018)
- Children: 3
- Education: National University of Malaysia
- Occupation: Politician

Ahmad Johnie bin Zawawi (born 1 June 1963) is a Malaysian politician who has served as the Chairman of Indah Water since May 2020 and the Member of Parliament (MP) for Igan since May 2018. He is a member of the Parti Pesaka Bumiputera Bersatu (PBB), a component party of the Gabungan Parti Sarawak (GPS) and formerly Barisan Nasional (BN) coalitions.

== Early career ==
Johnie was born in Daro, Mukah, Crown Colony of Sarawak on 1 June 1963. He obtained a bachelor's degree in political science from National University of Malaysia (UKM) in 1986. He worked at the Royal Malaysian Customs Department from 1988 to 2000 before serving as the Chief Operating Officer (COO) of The Sarawak Press and Warta Distributions from 2000 to 2004 as well as of the WHS Holdings from 2004 to 2015.

== Political career ==
In the 2018 general election, Ahmad Johnie was nominated by BN to contest for the Igan federal seat. He won the seat and was elected to the Parliament as the Igan MP for the first term after defeating Andri Zulkarnaen Hamden of Pakatan Harapan (PH) by a majority of 8,495 votes in a landslide victory.

On 17 May 2020, Ahmad Johnie was appointed the Chairman of Indah Water by Prime Minister Muhyiddin Yassin.

In the 2022 general election, Ahmad Johnie was nominated by GPS to defend the Igan seat. He defended the seat and was reelected to the Parliament as the Igan MP for the second term after Andri Zulkarnaen of PH in a rematch by a majority of 14,662 votes in another landslide victory.

== Personal life ==
Ahmad Johnie has three children with his wife. He is of Melanau descent.

== Election results ==
Parliament of Malaysia
Year	Constituency	Candidate	Votes	Pct	Opponent(s)	Votes	Pct	Ballots cast	Majority	Turnout
2018	P207 Igan	Ahmad Johnie Zawawi (PBB)	10,538	83.76%	Andri Zulkarnaen Hamden (AMANAH)	2,043	16.24%	12,996	8,495	66.33%
2022	P207 Igan	Ahmad Johnie Zawawi (PBB)	15,824	93.16%	Andri Zulkarnaen Hamden (AMANAH)	1,162	6.84%	17,286	14,662	61.10%

== Honours ==
=== Honours of Malaysia ===
- Malaysia
  - Officer of the Order of the Defender of the Realm (KMN) (2021)
  - Recipient of the 17th Yang di-Pertuan Agong Installation Medal (2024)
- Sarawak
  - Companion of the Most Exalted Order of the Star of Sarawak (JBS) (2022)
  - Silver Medal of the Sarawak Independence Diamond Jubilee Medal (2024)
