= Wahab Dolah =

Malaysian politician

Yang Berbahagia Dato Sri Wahab Dolah PNBS PGBK
- وهب دولة

Member of the Malaysian Parliament for Igan
- In office 8 March 2008 – 9 May 2018
- Preceded by: Constituency established
- Succeeded by: Ahmad Johnie Zawawi
- Majority: Unopposed (2008); 10,149 (2013)

Member of Parliament for Kuala Rajang
- In office 21 March 2004 – 8 March 2008
- Preceded by: Mohd Effendi Norwawi
- Succeeded by: Constituency abolished
- Majority: Unopposed (2004)

Personal details
- Born: Abdul Wahab bin Dolah; 15 November 1950 (age 75) Matu-Daro, Crown Colony of Sarawak
- Citizenship: Malaysian
- Party: Parti Pesaka Bumiputera Bersatu (PBB)
- Other political affiliations: Barisan Nasional (BN) (–2018); Gabungan Parti Sarawak (GPS) (2018–present)
- Spouse: Raesah Adai
- Education: University of Western Australia
- Occupation: Politician
- Profession: Engineer

Abdul Wahab bin Dolah (born 15 November 1950) is a Malaysian politician. He was the Member of the Parliament of Malaysia for the Igan constituency in Sarawak, representing the United Traditional Bumiputera Party (PBB) in the ruling Barisan Nasional coalition.

== Early life, education and career ==
Wahab Dolah was born on 15 November 1950 at Kampung Tian, Matu, Sarawak. He had nine siblings namely Rapiah, Jemani, Jamilah, Telaman, Ali Mat, Mariam, Nasibah and Sa'id. He firstly began his primary education at Sekolah Kebangsaan (SK) Bawang Tian, Matu before furthering his studies in different secondary schools such as Sekolah Menengah Kebangsaan (SMK) Luar Bandar Sibu, Sibu, SMK Penghulu Kedit, Kanowit and Kolej Tun Datuk Tuanku Haji Bujang in Tanjung Lobang, Miri.

He later pursued his higher education at University of Western Australia (under the Colombo Plan scholarship) and graduated in 1969 with a bachelor's degree of Civil Engineering.

After finishing his studies, Wahab firstly worked at Jabatan Kerja Raya (JKR) as a Regional Engineer in Sarikei until 1975. In 1976, Wahab was appointed as production manager at Sarawak Timber Industry Development Corporation (STIDC) until 1977. His big break came when he ventured to the private sector by working at a company known as WHS Consultant (Civil Engineering Consultant Firm) from 1978 until 1984.

== Political career ==
Whilst working at the WHS Consultant firm, Wahab was courted by Parti Pesaka Bumiputera Bersatu's (PBB) party leadership, to contest the Sarawak 4th state elections in 1983 for the N.24 Matu-Daro state constituency. Being regarded as a prominent public figure in his hometown, Wahab won the seat uncontested in 1983.

For the next 4 state elections (1987, 1991, 1996 and 2001), Wahab successfully retain his seat as its representative after beating former Chief Minister of Sarawak and Yang di-Pertua Negeri, Abdul Rahman Ya'kub with a majority of 1625 votes.

Before entering the federal Parliament, Wahab was active in Sarawak state politics, serving as a State Assemblyman for the seat of Matu-Daro from 1984, and as a member of the Sarawak Cabinet. He resigned from the State Cabinet in 2004, when he was elected to federal Parliament for the seat of Kuala Rajang. In the 2008 election he moved to the newly created seat of Igan. Both his 2004 and 2008 elections were unopposed. In 2013, he faced his first electoral opposition, a Pan-Malaysian Islamic Party (PAS) candidate whom he defeated with almost 87% of the vote.

== Election results ==
Sarawak State Legislative Assembly
Year	Constituency	Candidate	Votes	Pct	Opponent(s)	Votes	Pct	Ballots cast	Majority	Turnout
1983	N24 Matu-Daro	Abdul Wahab Dolah (PBB)	Unopposed							
1987	N24 Matu-Daro	Abdul Wahab Dolah (PBB)		59.05%	Abdul Rahman Ya'kub (PERMAS)		40.95%		1,625	
1991	N30 Matu-Daro	Abdul Wahab Dolah (PBB)	4,572	74.09%	Yusuf Abdul Rahman (PERMAS)	1,077	17.45%	6,305	3,495	75.10%
1991	N30 Matu-Daro	Abdul Wahab Dolah (PBB)	4,572	74.09%	Asbor Abdullah (DAP)	437	7.08%	6,305	3,495	75.10%
1991	N30 Matu-Daro	Abdul Wahab Dolah (PBB)	4,572	74.09%	Isnawi Sirat (NEGARA)	85	1.38%	6,305	3,495	75.10%
1996	N32 Matu-Daro	Abdul Wahab Dolah (PBB)	5,769	82.89%	Mostapa Kusairi (IND)	1,191	17.11%	7,167	4,578	72.74%
2001	N32 Matu-Daro	Abdul Wahab Dolah (PBB)	5,893	80.11%	Noh Saabi (IND)	1,463	19.89%	7,514	4,430	71.90%

Parliament of Malaysia
Year	Constituency	Candidate	Votes	Pct	Opponent(s)	Votes	Pct	Ballots cast	Majority	Turnout
2004	P206 Kuala Rajang	Abdul Wahab Dolah (PBB)	Unopposed							
2008	P207 Igan	Abdul Wahab Dolah (PBB)	Unopposed							
2013	P207 Igan	Abdul Wahab Dolah (PBB)	11,896	87.19%	Ajiji Fauzan (PAS)	1,747	12.81%	13,898	10,149	78.21%

== Honours ==
- Sarawak
  - Knight Commander of the Most Exalted Order of the Star of Sarawak (PNBS) – Dato Sri (2022)
  - Commander of the Order of the Star of Hornbill Sarawak (PGBK) – Datuk (1996)
  - Silver Medal of the Sarawak Independence Diamond Jubilee Medal (2024)
