= Zulkifli Hasan (academic) =

Malaysian Senator

Yang Berhormat Senator Dr. Zulkifli Hasan
- ذوالكفل حسن
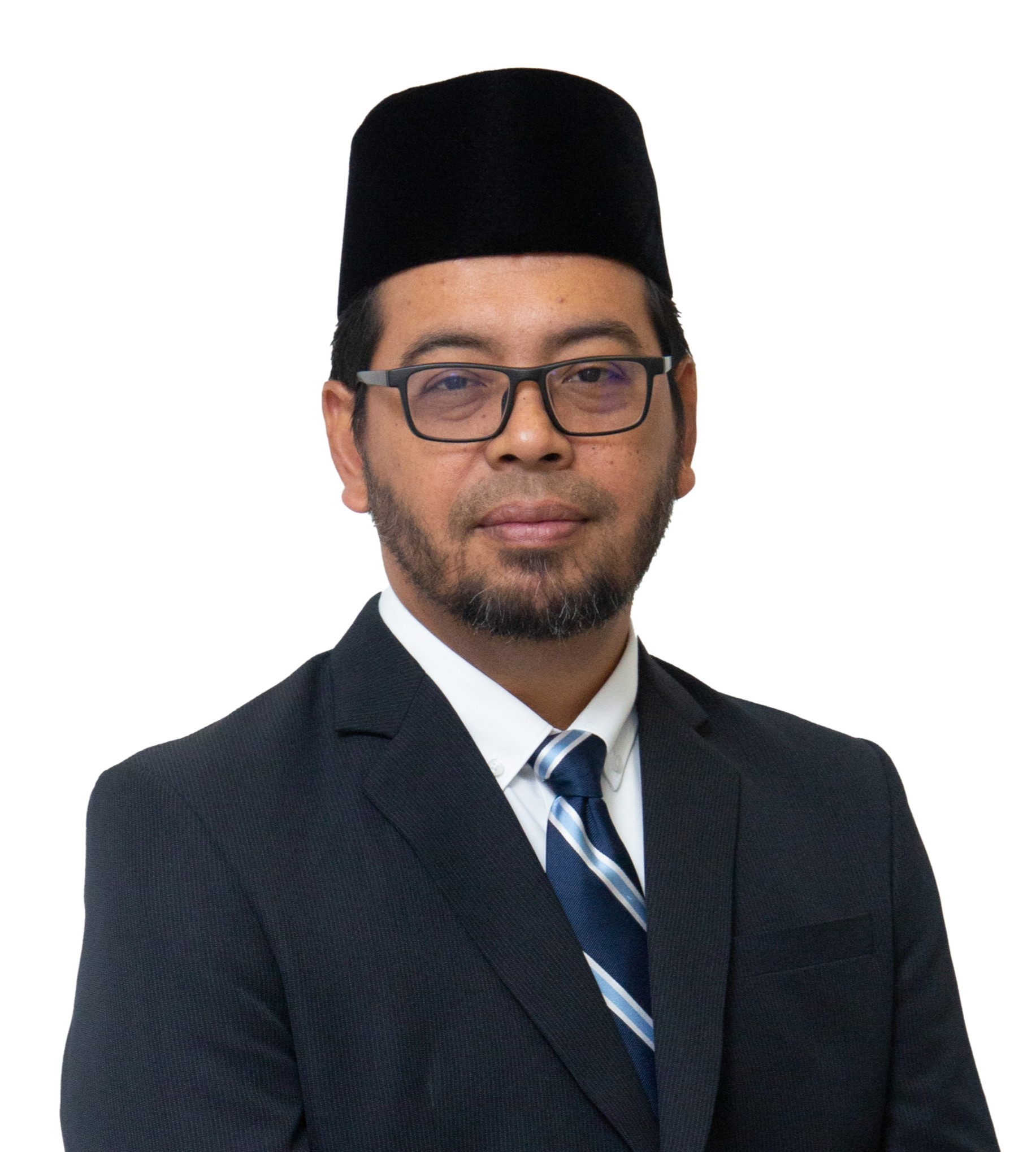

Minister in the Prime Minister's Department (Religious Affairs)
- Incumbent
- Assumed office 17 December 2025
- Monarch: Ibrahim Iskandar
- Prime Minister: Anwar Ibrahim
- Deputy: Marhamah Rosli
- Preceded by: Mohd Na'im Mokhtar
- Constituency: Senator

Deputy Minister in the Prime Minister's Department (Religious Affairs)
- In office 12 December 2023 – 17 December 2025
- Monarchs: Abdullah (2023–2024); Ibrahim Iskandar (2024–2025)
- Prime Minister: Anwar Ibrahim
- Minister: Mohd Na'im Mokhtar
- Preceded by: Ahmad Marzuk Shaary
- Succeeded by: Marhamah Rosli
- Constituency: Senator

Senator Appointed by the Yang di-Pertuan Agong
- Incumbent
- Assumed office 12 December 2023
- Monarchs: Abdullah (2023–2024); Ibrahim Iskandar (since 2024)
- Prime Minister: Anwar Ibrahim

Personal details
- Born: Zulkifli bin Hasan; 3 June 1977 (age 48) Tanjong Malim, Perak, Malaysia
- Party: Independent
- Profession: Academic

Zulkifli bin Hasan (born 3 June 1977) is a Malaysian academic who has served as the Minister in the Prime Minister's Department in charge of Religious Affairs in the Unity Government administration under Prime Minister Anwar Ibrahim since December 2025 as well as a Senator since December 2023. He served as the Deputy Minister in the Prime Minister's Department in charge of Religious Affairs in the Unity Government administration under Prime Minister Anwar and Minister Mohd Na'im Mokhtar from December 2022 to his promotion in December 2025. He was previously an academician (Professor) of the Syariah programme at the Universiti Sains Islam Malaysia (USIM) as well as the deputy rector of the International Islamic University Malaysia (IIUM).

== Career ==
In a cabinet reshuffle on 12 December 2023, shortly after being appointed as Professor of the Syariah programme at USIM, Zulkifli was selected as the Deputy Minister in the Prime Minister's Department in charge of Religious Affairs, deputising for Minister Mohd Na'im Mokhtar after the position was vacated for little over a year. Zulkifli was appointed as a Senator assembling in the Dewan Negara or the State Council in order be positioned as the new deputy minister as he was not a Member of Parliament (MP).

Zulkifli has held positions as Editor for the Malaysian Journal of Syariah and Law, Associate Editor for the Journal of Islamic Accounting and Business Research, and Advisory Board member of the Journal of Contemporary Maqasid Studies. Additionally, he was an Associate Editor for the Malaysian Journal of Islamic Movements and Muslim Societies. Zulkifli has also served on various expert panels, including those concerning Muamalat and Halal regulation for JAKIM (the Department of Islamic Development Malaysia), and has been involved in committees related to Syariah and legal education.

Zulkifli served as a board member of the Malaysian-American Commission on Educational Exchange (MACEE) and contributed as an Advisory Board member of Marmara University Institute of Islamic Economics and Finance in Istanbul, Turkey. Furthermore, his engagements include roles as a Senior Research Fellow at the University of Selangor and as an academic advisor for Dar al-Hikmah College in Selangor.

Zulkifli has served as the Board of Trustee of Global Peace Mission Malaysia and held leadership positions such as former Chairman of the Malaysian Islamic Youth Movement in Negeri Sembilan. Zulkifli has also been a board member of Sekolah Rendah Islam Seremban and as Chairman of MYCOM4SDG.

In the United Kingdom, he was involved with the Durham Islamic Society and the Palestine Solidarity Campaign. Similarly, in the United States, Zulkifli contributed to the Association of Muslim Lawyers of New York and the Fordham Islamic Society.

== Bibliography ==
1. Imam Yusuf al-Qaradawi: Pemikiran dan Pengaruhnya Terhadap gerakan Dakwah, Politik dan Masyarakat
2. Minda Masa Depan Strategik Katalis Reformasi Intelektual
3. Pemimpin Seribu Wajah – Himpunan Ceritera Mengenang Siddiq Fadzil
4. Ilmuan Pencerah Umat Misi dan Wawasan dalam Kebangkitan Islam di Alaf Baharu
5. Merintis Kampus Barakah
6. Kompendium Maqasid al-Shariah
7. Fiqh Isu Semasa
8. Student Union
9. The Edinburgh Companion to Shari’ah Governance in Islamic Finance
10. Readings in Islamic Economic and Finance
11. Manifesto Perubahan
12. Essential Readings in Islamic Finance
13. Islam Di Barat Muslim Di Timur
14. Hududisme: Antara Retorik Dan Realiti
15. Generasi Kedua Politikal Islam
16. Revolusi Intelektual
17. Rashid al-Ghannoushi: Intelektual-Reformis Politikal Islam
18. Pemikiran Yusuf Al Qaradhawi
19. Rashid al-Ghannoushi: Intelektual-Reformis Gerakan Islam
20. Shari’ah Governance in Islamic Banks
21. Konsep Sumpah (Al-Yamin) dan Pelaksanaannya di Mahkamah Syariah
22. Hudud di Malaysia: Cabaran Pelaksanaan
23. Islamic Banking and Financial Crisis: Reputation, Stability and Risks
24. Islamic Commercial Law Report 2016
25. Anwar Ibrahim: Semangat Anak Muda
26. Research in Corporate and Shari’ah Governance in the Muslim World: Theory and Practice
27. Developments in Malaysian Law
28. Masa Depan Strategik Kebangkitan Islam
29. Amalan Kehakiman dan Guaman Syarie di Malaysia
30. Diskusi Syariah dan Undang-Undang Siri 3

== Honours ==
- Malaysia :
  - Recipient of the 17th Yang di-Pertuan Agong Installation Medal
