= Mohd Na'im Mokhtar =

Malaysian politician, lawyer and legal scholar

Yang Berhormat Senator Dato' Setia Mohd Na'im Mokhtar SSIS DPMS AMN BSK PPC
- محمّد نعيم مختار

Minister in the Prime Minister's Department (Religious Affairs)
- In office 3 December 2022 – 17 December 2025
- Monarchs: Abdullah (2022–2024); Ibrahim Iskandar (since 2024)
- Prime Minister: Anwar Ibrahim
- Deputy: Zulkifli Hasan (since 2023)
- Preceded by: Idris Ahmad
- Succeeded by: Zulkifli Hasan
- Constituency: Senator

Senator Appointed by the Yang di-Pertuan Agong
- Incumbent
- Assumed office 3 December 2022
- Monarchs: Abdullah (2022–2024); Ibrahim Iskandar (since 2024)
- Prime Minister: Anwar Ibrahim

4th Chief Judge of the Syariah Court
- In office 1 April 2019 – 3 December 2022
- Monarch: Abdullah
- Prime Minister: Mahathir Mohamad (2019–2020); Muhyiddin Yassin (2020–2021); Ismail Sabri Yaakob (2021–2022); Anwar Ibrahim (24 November–3 December 2022)
- Preceded by: Mukhyuddin Ibrahim
- Succeeded by: Mohd Amran Mat Zain

Personal details
- Born: Mohd Na'im bin Mokhtar; 25 November 1967 (age 58) Kuala Lumpur, Selangor (now Wilayah Persekutuan) Malaysia
- Party: Independent
- Spouse: Nik Roslini Raja Ismail
- Children: 3
- Education: International Islamic University Malaysia; University of London; National University of Malaysia
- Occupation: Politician, legal scholar
- Profession: Lawyer

Mohd Na'im bin Mokhtar (Jawi: محمد نعيم بن مختار; born 25 November 1967) is a Malaysian politician, lawyer and legal scholar who has served as a Senator since December 2022. He served as the Minister in the Prime Minister's Department in charge of Religious Affairs in the Anwar Ibrahim cabinet from December 2022 to December 2025. He served as 4th Chief Judge of the Syariah Court from April 2019 to his appointment as a minister in December 2022. He was one of the two independent Cabinet ministers alongside the Minister of Finance II Amir Hamzah Azizan and the sole independent Cabinet minister before the 2023 cabinet reshuffle.

== Education ==
Na’im was educated at the International Islamic University Malaysia, where he obtained a Bachelor of Laws (LLB) degree. He subsequently earned a Masters in Laws (LLM) degree from the University of London and a Diploma in Syariah Law and Practice from the International Islamic University Malaysia. He also holds a Doctor of Philosophy (PhD) in Syariah from the National University of Malaysia.

== Career ==
Na’im began his career as a law lecturer at the International Islamic University Malaysia. He later worked as a Syariah lawyer in Negeri Sembilan, Malacca, and the Federal Territories, and as an advocate and solicitor in Malaya. In 1998, he was appointed a Judge for the Syariah Court of Petaling, where he served until 2001. He was subsequently appointed a Judge for the Syariah Court of the Federal Territory of Kuala Lumpur, where he served until 2003. In 2003, he was appointed a research officer by the Syariah Judiciary Department Malaysia, where he worked until 2005. He has also served as a visiting lecturer at the National University of Malaysia and the International Islamic University Malaysia.

In addition to his judicial duties, Na’im has been a visiting fellow at the Oxford Centre for Islamic Studies at Oxford University and at Harvard Law School. He has also been appointed an external examiner for PhD candidates at the International Islamic University Malaysia, the MARA University of Technology, and the National University of Malaysia. He sits on the Malaysian Qualifying Agency panel and committee and is an adjunct professor at the law faculty of the University Technology Mara.

Na’im has participated in many local and international seminars on family law, Syariah law, and related topics. He has also presented papers on these subjects at conferences in Malaysia and abroad. He sits on the Syariah advisory boards of several local and foreign Islamic banks and takaful companies.

In December 2022, he was appointed a Minister in the Prime Minister's Department for Religious Affairs in the Anwar Ibrahim cabinet.

== Honours ==
- Malaysia
  - Member of the Order of the Defender of the Realm (AMN) (2008)
  - Recipient of the Distinguished Service Medal (PPC)
  - Recipient of the 17th Yang di-Pertuan Agong Installation Medal (2024)
- Kelantan
  - Officer of the Order of Loyalty to the Crown of Kelantan (BSK) (2010)
- Selangor
  - Knight Grand Companion of the Order of Sultan Sharafuddin Idris Shah (SSIS) – Dato' Setia (2020)
  - Knight Commander of the Order of the Crown of Selangor (DPMS) – Dato' (2015)
