= Abang Abu Bakar =

Malaysian politician (1941–2023)

Yang Berbahagia Tan Sri Dato Sri Abang Haji Abu Bakar Bin Datuk Bandar Abang Haji Mustapha PSM PNBS DSAP DPTJ JMN

Minister in the Prime Minister's Department
- In office 1990–1999
- Preceded by: Kasitah Gaddam
- Succeeded by: Bernard Giluk Dompok

Member of the Malaysian Parliament for Kuala Rajang, Sarawak
- In office 1990–1999
- Preceded by: Constituency established
- Succeeded by: Mohd Effendi Norwawi

Deputy Minister of Defence
- In office 1987–1990
- Preceded by: Abu Hassan Omar
- Succeeded by: Wan Abu Bakar Wan Mohamed

Member of the Malaysian Parliament for Paloh, Sarawak
- In office 1982–1990
- Preceded by: Abdul Rahman Ya'kub
- Succeeded by: Constituency abolished

Member of the Sarawak State Legislative Assembly for Satok
- In office 1979–1981
- Preceded by: Constituency established
- Succeeded by: Abang Abdul Rahman Johari Abang Openg

Personal details
- Born: 28 June 1941
- Died: 4 December 2023 (aged 82) Institut Jantung Negara (IJN), Kuala Lumpur, Malaysia
- Party: Parti Pesaka Bumiputera Bersatu (PBB)
- Other political affiliations: Barisan Nasional (BN)
- Spouse: Tunku Maziah Tunku Mustapha
- Children: 3
- Parents: Datu Bandar Abang Haji Mustapha Abang Haji Moasali (father); Dayang Fatima Muhammad ‘Ali (mother)
- Occupation: Politicians

Abang Abu Bakar bin Abang Mustapha (Jawi: ابڠ ابو بكر بن ابڠ مصطفى; 28 June 1941 – 4 December 2023) was a Malaysian politician who was Minister in the Prime Minister's Department from 1999 to 2003 and a Member of Parliament for Kuala Rajang, Sarawak.

== Education ==
Abu Bakar received his primary school education in St Thomas's School, Kuching then went further with his secondary school education to the premier Malay College Kuala Kangsar. His later education was at King's College, Warrnambool, Australia, University of Adelaide, South Australia and Inner Temple, London and International Management Centre for his MBA which he received in 1990.

== Career ==
Abu Bakar was the Managing Director of Progressive Insurance Sdn Bhd, Executive Secretary of Sarawak Alliance Party in 1970, MLA for Kuching Barat (1973–1981) and Satok (1979–1981). He was also the Speaker of the State Council from 1976 to 1981, Member of Parliament for Paloh (1981–1990) and Kuala Rajang (1990–2000). From 1988 to 1998, he was the Deputy President of Parti Pesaka Bumiputera Bersatu.

In the Tun Dr Mahathir Mohamad first cabinet, he was appointed the Deputy Minister of Defence, then the Minister in Prime Minister's Department in 1990–1999 and lastly the Minister of Defence in 1999–2003.

Abu Bakar was also active as the President of the Sarawak Native Chamber of Commerce and Sarawak Muslim Welfare Association.

== Personal life ==
Abu Bakar married Puan Sri Tunku Maziah binti Tunku Mustapha in 1974. He had a daughter, and a pair of twin sons.

== Death ==
Abu Bakar died on 4 December 2023 in Kuala Lumpur, at the age of 82.

== Election results ==
Sarawak State Legislative Assembly
Year	Constituency	Candidate	Votes	Pct	Opponent(s)	Votes	Pct	Ballots cast	Majority	Turnout
1974	N03 Kuching Barat	Abang Abu Bakar Abang Mustapha (PBB)								
1979	N06 Satok	Abang Abu Bakar Abang Mustapha (PBB)	10,506	77.60%	Wan Ahmadul Badwi Wan (PAJAR)	2,293	16.94%	13,736	8,213	73.60%
1979	N06 Satok	Abang Abu Bakar Abang Mustapha (PBB)	10,506	77.60%	Kho King Hing (IND)	740	5.46%	13,736	8,213	73.60%

Parliament of Malaysia
Year	Constituency	Candidate	Votes	Pct	Opponent(s)	Votes	Pct	Ballots cast	Majority	Turnout
1981	P142 Paloh	Abang Abu Bakar Abang Mustapha (PBB)	Unopposed							
1982	P142 Paloh	Abang Abu Bakar Abang Mustapha (PBB)	9,512	77.50%	Udie Salleh (IND)	2,761	22.50%	12,556	6,751	73.03%
1986	P165 Paloh	Abang Abu Bakar Abang Mustapha (PBB)	Unopposed							
1990	P167 Kuala Rajang	Abang Abu Bakar Abang Mustapha (PBB)	10,886	72.53%	Asbor Abdullah (IND)	2,230	14.86%	15,419	8,656	65.62%
1990	P167 Kuala Rajang	Abang Abu Bakar Abang Mustapha (PBB)	10,886	72.53%	Ali Hassan Jajol (IND)	1,892	12.61%	15,419	8,656	65.62%
1995	P169 Kuala Rajang	Abang Abu Bakar Abang Mustapha (PBB)	Unopposed							

== Honours ==
=== Honours of Malaysia ===
- Malaysia
  - Commander of the Order of Loyalty to the Crown of Malaysia (PSM) – Tan Sri (2013)
  - Companion of the Order of the Defender of the Realm (JMN) (1981)
- Negeri Sembilan
  - Knight Commander of the Grand Order of Tuanku Ja'afar (DPTJ) – Dato' (1990)
- Pahang
  - Knight Companion of Order of Sultan Ahmad Shah of Pahang (DSAP) – Dato' (1984)
- Sarawak
  - Knight Commander of the Most Exalted Order of the Star of Sarawak (PNBS) – formerly Dato', now Dato Sri (1985)
