= Ikmal Hisham Abdul Aziz =

Malaysian politician

Yang Berhormat Dato' Sri Ikmal Hisham Abdul Aziz SSAP DIMP AIS MP
- إكمال هشام عبد العزيز

Deputy Minister of Defence
- In office 30 August 2021 – 24 November 2022
- Monarch: Abdullah
- Prime Minister: Ismail Sabri Yaakob
- Minister: Hishammuddin Hussein
- Preceded by: Himself
- Succeeded by: Adly Zahari
- Constituency: Tanah Merah
- In office 10 March 2020 – 16 August 2021
- Monarch: Abdullah
- Prime Minister: Muhyiddin Yassin
- Minister: Ismail Sabri Yaakob
- Preceded by: Liew Chin Tong
- Succeeded by: Himself
- Constituency: Tanah Merah

Member of the Malaysian Parliament for Tanah Merah
- Incumbent
- Assumed office 5 May 2013
- Preceded by: Amran Ab Ghani (PKR)
- Majority: 4,227 (2013); 2,929 (2018); 44,485 (2022)

Faction represented in Dewan Rakyat
- 2013–2018: Barisan Nasional
- 2018–2019: Independent
- 2019–2020: Pakatan Harapan
- 2020: Malaysian United Indigenous Party
- 2020–: Perikatan Nasional

Personal details
- Born: Ikmal Hisham bin Abdul Aziz; 10 March 1965 (age 61) Tanah Merah, Kelantan, Malaysia
- Citizenship: Malaysian
- Party: United Malay National Organisation (UMNO) ( until 2018); Independent (2018–2019); Malaysian United Indigenous Party (BERSATU) (since 2019)
- Other political affiliations: Barisan Nasional (BN) (until 2018); Pakatan Harapan (PH) (2019–2020); Perikatan Nasional (PN) (since 2020)
- Spouse: Norihan Ayob (died 2023)
- Children: 4 (incl. Ikmal Hazlan)
- Occupation: Politician

Ikmal Hisham bin Abdul Aziz (Jawi: إكمال هشام بن عبد العزيز; born 10 March 1965) is a Malaysian politician who has served as the Member of Parliament (MP) for Tanah Merah since May 2013. He served as the Deputy Minister of Defence for the second term in the Barisan Nasional (BN) administration under former prime minister Ismail Sabri Yaakob and former Minister Hishammuddin Hussein from August 2021 to the collapse of the BN administration in November 2022 and the first term in the Perikatan Nasional (PN) administration under former Prime Minister Muhyiddin Yassin and former Minister Ismail Sabri from March 2020 to the collapse of the PN administration in August 2021. He is a Supreme Council Member and the Division Chief of Tanah Merah of the Malaysian United Indigenous Party (BERSATU), a component party of the PN and formerly Pakatan Harapan (PH) coalitions and was a member of the United Malays National Organisation (UMNO), a component party of the Barisan Nasional (BN) coalition. After the defeat of BN to PH in 2018 general election, he resigned from UMNO in 2018 and joined BERSATU in 2019.

== Political career ==
In May 2013, Ikmal first contested to become an MP in the 13th Malaysian general election and subsequently won the Tanah Merah seat with a majority of 4747.

He was successfully re-elected as MP for the same seat in the 14th Malaysian general election.

He resigned from UMNO to be an Independent politician in 2018.

Presently he is a member of the Malaysian United Indigenous Party or Parti Pribumi Bersatu Malaysia (BERSATU), a component of Perikatan Nasional (PN) government.

== Controversy ==
=== Alleged vaping in the Dewan Rakyat ===
On 19 September 2023, PN MPs staged a walkout from the Dewan Rakyat chamber as a sign of protest against the decision of the Speaker of the Dewan Rakyat, Johari Abdul in not demanding Prime Minister Anwar Ibrahim to apologise for his comments on the Putrajaya MP, Radzi Jidin. During the walkout, he was photographed by the photographer of Prime Minister Anwar allegedly vaping while still being in the chamber. He strongly denied the allegations and claiming he was holding a pen in his mouth. He also filed a police report against the photographer for accusing him of vaping in Dewan Rakyat.

== Election results ==
Parliament of Malaysia
Year	Constituency	Candidate	Votes	Pct	Opponent(s)	Votes	Pct	Ballots cast	Majority	Turnout
2013	P027 Tanah Merah	Ikmal Hisham Abdul Aziz (UMNO)	26,505	54.10%	Nik Mahmood Nik Hassan (PKR)	22,278	45.47%	50,009	4,227	85.87%
2013	P027 Tanah Merah	Ikmal Hisham Abdul Aziz (UMNO)	26,505	54.10%	Ahmad Fizal Che Harun (IND)	213	0.43%	50,009	4,227	85.87%
2018	P027 Tanah Merah	Ikmal Hisham Abdul Aziz (UMNO)	28,152	48.44%	Johari Mat (PAS)	25,223	43.40%	59,598	2,929	81.45%
2018	P027 Tanah Merah	Ikmal Hisham Abdul Aziz (UMNO)	28,152	48.44%	Mohamad Fauzi Zakaria (PKR)	4,747	8.17%	59,598	2,929	81.45%
2022	P027 Tanah Merah	Ikmal Hisham Abdul Aziz (BERSATU)	54,226	77.87%	Bakri @ Mohd Bakri Mustapha (UMNO)	9,781	14.04%	70,667	44,485	70.55%
2022	P027 Tanah Merah	Ikmal Hisham Abdul Aziz (BERSATU)	54,226	77.87%	Mohamad Supardi Md Noor (PKR)	5,357	7.69%	70,667	44,485	70.55%

== Honours ==
=== Honours of Malaysia ===
- Malaysia
  - Recipient of the 17th Yang di-Pertuan Agong Installation Medal (2024)
- Selangor
  - Member of the Order of Sultan Sharafuddin Idris Shah (AIS) (2002)
- Pahang
  - Knight Grand Companion of the Order of Sultan Ahmad Shah of Pahang (SSAP) – Dato' Sri (2015)
  - Knight Companion of the Order of the Crown of Pahang (DIMP) – Dato' (2009)
