= Kuala Rajang (federal constituency) =

Sarawak constituency

Defunct federal constituency
- Legislature: Dewan Rakyat
- Constituency created: 1987
- Constituency abolished: 2008
- First contested: 1990
- Last contested: 2004

Kuala Rajang was a federal constituency in Sarawak, Malaysia, that was represented in the Dewan Rakyat from 1990 to 2008.

The federal constituency was created in the 1987 redistribution and was mandated to return a single member to the Dewan Rakyat under the first past the post voting system.

== History ==
It was abolished in 2008 when it was redistributed.

=== Representation history ===
Members of Parliament for Kuala Rajang
Parliament	No	Years	Member	Party	Vote Share
Constituency created from Paloh, Sarikei and Rajang
8th	P167	1990-1995	Abang Abu Bakar Abang Mustapha (ابڠ ابو بكر ابڠ مصطفى)	BN (PBB)	10,886; 72.53%
9th	P169	1995–1999	Abang Abu Bakar Abang Mustapha (ابڠ ابو بكر ابڠ مصطفى)	BN (PBB)	Uncontested
10th	P180	1999-2004	Mohd Effendi Norwawi (محمد ايففيند نورواوي)	BN (PBB)	14,306; 79.36%
11th	P206	2004-2008	Wahab Dolah (وهب دولة)	BN (PBB)	Uncontested
Constituency abolished, split into Igan and Tanjong Manis

=== State constituency ===
Parliamentary constituency	State constituency					
Parliamentary constituency	1969–1978	1978–1990	1990–1999	1999–2008	2008–2016	2016−present
Kuala Rajang			Belawai			
Kuala Rajang			Matu-Daro			
Kuala Rajang			Serdeng			

=== Historical boundaries ===
State Constituency	Area	
State Constituency	1987	1996
Belawai	Balai; Belawai; Kuala Rajang; Selalang; Tanjung Manis	
Matu-Daro	Daro; Kampung Muara Sawai; Matu; Singat; Tanjung Meruan	
Serdeng	Batang Lassa; Kampung Serdau; Mupong; Pulau Bruit; Serdeng	

== Election results ==
Malaysian general election, 2004
Party	Candidate	Votes	%	∆%
On the nomination day, Wahab Dolah won uncontested.
BN	Wahab Dolah			
Total valid votes			100.00	
Total rejected ballots				
Unreturned ballots				
Turnout				
Registered electors		28,706		
Majority				
BN hold		Swing		

Elector count is from Tindak Malaysia's GitHub

Malaysian general election, 1999
Party	Candidate	Votes	%	∆%
BN	Mohd Effendi Norwawi	14,306	79.36	▲79.36
PKR	Lamasudin @ Udie Salleh @ Urdie Salleh	3,720	20.64	▲20.64
Total valid votes		18,026	100.00	
Total rejected ballots		486		
Unreturned ballots		31		
Turnout		18,543	67.07	
Registered electors				
Majority		10,586	58.72	
BN hold		Swing		

Malaysian general election, 1995
Party	Candidate	Votes	%	∆%
On the nomination day, Abang Abu Bakar Abang Mustapha won uncontested.
BN	Abang Abu Bakar Abang Mustapha			
Total valid votes			100.00	
Total rejected ballots				
Unreturned ballots				
Turnout		27,647		
Registered electors		27,339		
Majority				
BN hold		Swing		

Elector Count is from Tindak Malaysia's GitHub

Malaysian general election, 1990
Party	Candidate	Votes	%
BN	Abang Abu Bakar Abang Mustapha	10,886	72.53
Independent	Asbor Abdullah	2,230	14.86
Independent	Ali Hassan Jajol	1,892	12.61
Total valid votes		15,008	100.00
Total rejected ballots		411	
Unreturned ballots		0	
Turnout		15,419	65.62
Registered electors		23,498	
Majority		8,656	57.67
This was a new constituency created.
