= Tanah Merah (federal constituency) =

Federal constituency of Kelantan, Malaysia

Tanah Merah (P027)
Kelantan constituency
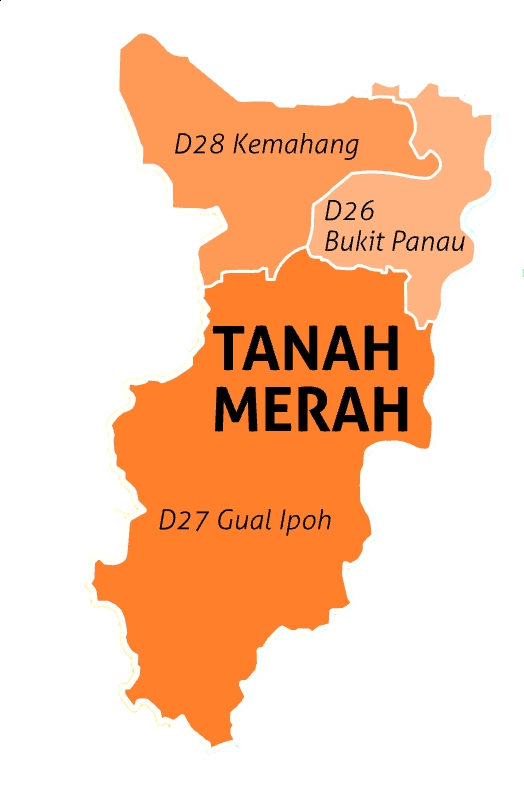

Federal constituency
- Legislature: Dewan Rakyat
- MP: Ikmal Hisham Abdul Aziz; PN
- Constituency created: 1958
- First contested: 1959
- Last contested: 2022

Demographics
- Population (2020): 126,470
- Electors (2023): 99,213
- Area (km²): 687
- Pop. density (per km²): 184.1

Tanah Merah is a federal constituency in Tanah Merah District, Kelantan, Malaysia, that has been represented in the Dewan Rakyat since 1959. Tanah Merah is between Machang and Jeli.

The federal constituency was created in the 1958 redistribution and is mandated to return a single member to the Dewan Rakyat under the first past the post voting system.

== Demographics ==
https://live.chinapress.com.my/ge15/parliament/KELANTAN

Ethnic breakdown of Tanah Merah's electorate as of 2022
1. Malay (94.8%)
2. Chinese (4.10%)
3. Other ethnicities (0.60%)
4. Indian (0.50%)

As of 2020, Tanah Merah has a population of 126,470 people.

Age breakdown of Tanah Merah's electorate as of 2022
1. 18-20 (6.85%)
2. 21-29 (23.5%)
3. 30-39 (24.7%)
4. 40-49 (17.4%)
5. 50-59 (12.9%)
6. 60-69 (9.57%)
7. 70-79 (3.97%)
8. 80-89 (1.03%)
9. above 90 (0.19%)
Gender breakdown of Tanah Merah's electorate as of 2022
1. Male (49.3%)
2. Female (50.7%)

== History ==
=== Polling districts ===
According to the federal gazette issued on 18 July 2023, the Tanah Merah constituency is divided into 33 polling districts.

State constituency	Polling Districts	Code	Location
Bukit Panau (N26）	Bukit Panau	027/26/01	SK Bukit Panau
Bukit Panau (N26）	Kampung Paloh	027/26/02	SMU (A) Rahmaniah Paloh
Bukit Panau (N26）	Kampung Belimbing	027/26/03	SK Belimbing
Bukit Panau (N26）	Padang Siam	027/26/04	Maahad Ahmadi Tanah Merah
Bukit Panau (N26）	Kelewek	027/26/05	SK Sri Kelewek
Bukit Panau (N26）	Kampung Sat	027/26/06	SJK (C) Yuk Cheng
Bukit Panau (N26）	Banggol	027/26/07	SMK Dato' Mahmud Paduka Raja (1)
Bukit Panau (N26）	Pondok	027/26/08	SK Sri Suria (1)
Bukit Panau (N26）	Tanah Merah Pekan	027/26/09	SK Tanah Merah (1)
Bukit Panau (N26）	Tepi Sungai	027/26/10	SMK Dato' Mahmud Paduka Raja (2)
Bukit Panau (N26）	Batu Hitam	027/26/11	SK Tanah Merah (2)
Bukit Panau (N26）	Banggol Kemunting	027/26/12	SK Sri Suria (3)
Bukit Panau (N26）	Manal	027/26/13	SMK Tanah Merah (2)
Gual Ipoh (N27）	Kuala Paku	027/27/01	SK Ipoh
Gual Ipoh (N27）	Bechah Laut	027/27/02	SK Bechah Laut
Gual Ipoh (N27）	Pekan Gual Ipoh	027/27/03	SMK Ipoh
Gual Ipoh (N27）	Ulu Kusial	027/27/04	SK Ulu Kusial
Gual Ipoh (N27）	Bukit Durian	027/27/05	SK Bukit Durian
Gual Ipoh (N27）	Terasil	027/27/06	SK Kulim
Gual Ipoh (N27）	Tebing Tinggi	027/27/07	SK Tebing Tinggi
Gual Ipoh (N27）	Kongsi Lima	027/27/08	SK Kampong Panjang
Gual Ipoh (N27）	Kerilla	027/27/09	SMK Ladang Kerilla
Gual Ipoh (N27）	Kuala Tiga	027/27/10	SK Kuala Tiga
Gual Ipoh (N27）	Blok Sokor	027/27/11	SK Sokor
Gual Ipoh (N27）	Kg Peralla	027/27/12	SK Peralla
Gual Ipoh (N27）	Tok Che Dol	027/27/13	SK Tok Che Dol
Kemahang (N28）	FELDA Kemahang 1	027/28/01	SMK Kemahang
Kemahang (N28）	FELDA Kemahang 3	027/28/02	SK Kemahang 3
Kemahang (N28）	FELDA Kemahang 2	027/28/03	SK Kemahang (2)
Kemahang (N28）	Bukit Mas	027/28/04	SMK Alor Pasir
Kemahang (N28）	Bukit Gading	027/28/05	SK Bukit Gading
Kemahang (N28）	Bendang Nyior	027/28/06	SK Bendang Nyior
Kemahang (N28）	Batang Merbau	027/28/07	SK Batang Merbau

=== Representation history ===
Members of Parliament for Tanah Merah
Parliament	No	Years	Member	Party	Vote Share
Constituency created from Kelantan Selatan
Parliament of the Federation of Malaya
1st	P023	1959–1963	Othman Abdullah (عثمان عبدالله)	PMIP	12,752; 65.31%
Parliament of Malaysia
1st	P023	1963–1964	Othman Abdullah (عثمان عبدالله)	PMIP	12,752; 65.31%
2nd	P023	1964–1969	Mustapha Ahmad (مصطفى أحمد)	PMIP	12,318; 51.61%
		1969–1971	Parliament was suspended		
3rd	P023	1971–1973	Mohamed Yaacob (محمد يعقوب)	Alliance (UMNO)	14,856; 51.76%
3rd	P023	1973–1974	Mohamed Yaacob (محمد يعقوب)	BN (UMNO)	14,856; 51.76%
4th	P023	1974–1978	Mohamed Yaacob (محمد يعقوب)	BN (UMNO)	Uncontested
5th	P023	1978–1982	Hussein Mahmood (حسين محمود)	BN (UMNO)	10,448; 56.33%
6th	P023	1982–1986	Hussein Mahmood (حسين محمود)	BN (UMNO)	14,509; 56.97%
7th	P026	1986–1990	Hashim Safin (هاشم صفين)	BN (UMNO)	14,969; 56.72%
8th	P026	1990–1995	Ibrahim Pateh Mohammad (إبراهيم ڤاتح محمّد)	S46	20,708; 64.46%
9th	P027	1995–1999	Ibrahim Pateh Mohammad (إبراهيم ڤاتح محمّد)	S46	14,991; 50.39%
10th	P027	1999–2004	Saupi Daud (صوڤي داود)	BA (keADILan)	18,559; 57.17%
11th	P027	2004–2008	Shaari Hassan (شعري حسّان)	BN (UMNO)	16,107; 54.26%
12th	P027	2008–2013	Amran Ab Ghani (عمران عبدالغني)	PR (PKR)	17,554; 50.20%
13th	P027	2013–2018	Ikmal Hisham Abdul Aziz (إكمال هشام عبد العزيز)	BN (UMNO)	26,505; 54.10%
14th	P027	2018	Ikmal Hisham Abdul Aziz (إكمال هشام عبد العزيز)	BN (UMNO)	28,152; 48.44%
14th	P027	2018–2019	Ikmal Hisham Abdul Aziz (إكمال هشام عبد العزيز)	Independent	28,152; 48.44%
14th	P027	2019–2020	Ikmal Hisham Abdul Aziz (إكمال هشام عبد العزيز)	PH (BERSATU)	28,152; 48.44%
14th	P027	2020–2022	Ikmal Hisham Abdul Aziz (إكمال هشام عبد العزيز)	PN (BERSATU)	28,152; 48.44%
15th	P027	2022–present	Ikmal Hisham Abdul Aziz (إكمال هشام عبد العزيز)	PN (BERSATU)	54,279; 77.87%

=== State constituency ===
Parliamentary constituency	State constituency						
Parliamentary constituency	1955–1959*	1959–1974	1974–1986	1986–1995	1995–2004	2004–2018	2018–present
Tanah Merah			Bukit Panau				
Tanah Merah					Chetok		
Tanah Merah			Gual Ipoh		Gual Ipoh		
Tanah Merah				Jeli			
Tanah Merah						Kemahang	
Tanah Merah			Lanas				
Tanah Merah				Panglima Bayu			
Tanah Merah		Machang Utara					
Tanah Merah		Tanah Merah Barat					
Tanah Merah		Tanah Merah Timor					

=== Historical boundaries ===
State Constituency	Area					
State Constituency	1959	1974	1984	1994	2003	2018
Bukit Panau		Banggol; Bendang Nyior; Kampung Sat; Kelewek; Tanah Merah			Banggol; Bukit Panau; Kampung Sat; Kelewek; Tanah Merah	
Chetok				Chetok; Chicha Tinggi; Gabus; Perupok; To Uban		
Gual Ipoh		Bukit Durian; Gual Ipoh; Kuala Paku; Tok Che Dol; Ulu Kusial		Bukit Durian; Gual Ipoh; Kuala Paku; Tok Che Dol; Ulu Kusial		
Jeli			Ayer Lanas; Batu Melintang; Jeli; Kampung Legeh; Pergau			
Kemahang					Batang Merbau; Bendang Nyior; Bukit Gading; Bukit Mas; FELDA Kemahang 1-3	
Lanas		Batang Merbau; Bukit Gading; Bukit Mas; FELDA Kemahang 1-3; Kampung Lawang				
Panglima Bayu			Batang Merbau; Bukit Gading; Bukit Mas; FELDA Kemahang 1-3; Kampung Lawang			
Machang Utara	Pulai Chondong; Jenereh Bongkok; Kemahang; Kemubu; Wakaf Bata					
Tanah Merah Barat	Ayer Lanas; Batang Merbau; Bukit Gading; Jeli; Kemahang					
Tanah Merah Timor	Banggol; Bendang Nyior; Kuala Paku; Tanah Merah; Ulu Kusial					

=== Current state assembly members ===
No.	State Constituency	Member	Coalition (Party)
N26	Bukit Panau	Abdul Fattah Mahmood	PN (PAS)
N27	Gual Ipoh	Bahari Mohd Nor	PN (BERSATU)
N28	Kemahang	Md Anizam Ab Rahman	PN (PAS)

=== Local governments & postcodes ===
No.	State Constituency	Local Government	Postcode
N26	Bukit Panau	Tanah Merah District Council	17500, 17510 Tanah Merah
N27	Gual Ipoh	Tanah Merah District Council	17500, 17510 Tanah Merah
N28	Kemahang	Tanah Merah District Council	17500, 17510 Tanah Merah

== Election results ==
Malaysian general election, 2022
Party	Candidate	Votes	%	∆%
PAS	Ikmal Hisham Abdul Aziz	54,279	77.87	▲34.47
BN	Mohd Bakri Mustapha	9,781	14.04	▼34.40
PH	Mohamad Suparadi Md Noor	5,357	7.69	▲7.69
PUTRA	Nasir Abdullah	168	0.24	▲0.24
Independent	Nik Sapeia Nik Yusof	114	0.16	▲0.16
Total valid votes		69,686	100.00	
Total rejected ballots		624		
Unreturned ballots		161		
Turnout		70,667	71.34	▼10.11
Registered electors		98,782		
Majority		44,498	63.83	▲58.79
PAS gain from BN		Swing		?
Source(s) https://lom.agc.gov.my/ilims/upload/portal/akta/outputp/1753266/PUB%20607%20(2022).pdf

Malaysian general election, 2018
Party	Candidate	Votes	%	∆%
BN	Ikmal Hisham Abdul Aziz	28,152	48.44	▼5.66
PAS	Johari Mat	25,223	43.40	▲43.40
PKR	Mohamad Fauzi Zakaria	4,747	8.17	▼37.30
Total valid votes		58,122	100.00	
Total rejected ballots		986		
Unreturned ballots		490		
Turnout		59,598	81.45	▼4.42
Registered electors		73,172		
Majority		2,929	5.04	▼3.59
BN hold		Swing		
Source(s) "His Majesty's Government Gazette - Notice of Contested Election, Parliament for the State of Kelantan [P.U. (B) 234/2018]" (PDF). Attorney General's Chambers of Malaysia. 3 May 2018. "Federal Government Gazette - Results of Contested Election and Statements of the Poll after the Official Addition of Votes, Parliamentary Constituencies for the State of Kelantan [P.U. (B) 308/2018]" (PDF). Attorney General's Chambers of Malaysia. 28 May 2018.

Malaysian general election, 2013
Party	Candidate	Votes	%	∆%
BN	Ikmal Hisham Abdul Aziz	26,505	54.10	▲8.42
PKR	Nik Mahmood Nik Hassan	22,278	45.47	▼4.73
Independent	Ahmad Fizal Che Harun	213	0.43	▲0.43
Total valid votes		48,996	100.00	
Total rejected ballots		876		
Unreturned ballots		137		
Turnout		50,009	85.87	▲4.41
Registered electors		58,237		
Majority		4,227	8.63	▲4.11
BN gain from PKR		Swing		?
Source(s) "Federal Government Gazette - Notice of Contested Election, Parliament for the State of Kelantan [P.U. (B) 171/2013]" (PDF). Attorney General's Chambers of Malaysia. 26 April 2013. "Federal Government Gazette - Results of Contested Election and Statements of the Poll after the Official Addition of Votes, Parliamentary Constituencies for the State of Kelantan [P.U. (B) 212/2013]" (PDF). Attorney General's Chambers of Malaysia. 22 May 2013. Archived from the original (PDF) on 2019-12-29.

Malaysian general election, 2008
Party	Candidate	Votes	%	∆%
PKR	Amran Ab Ghani	17,554	50.20	▲4.46
BN	Shaari Hassan	15,970	45.68	▼8.58
Independent	Asmadi Abu Bakar	1,439	4.12	▲4.12
Total valid votes		34,963	100.00	
Total rejected ballots		1,064		
Unreturned ballots		99		
Turnout		36,126	81.46	▼0.57
Registered electors		44,347		
Majority		1,584	4.52	▼4.00
PKR gain from BN		Swing		?

Malaysian general election, 2004
Party	Candidate	Votes	%	∆%
BN	Shaari Hassan	16,107	54.26	▲11.43
PKR	Saupi Daud	13,580	45.74	▼11.43
Total valid votes		29,687	100.00	
Total rejected ballots		788		
Unreturned ballots		421		
Turnout		30,896	82.03	▲4.32
Registered electors		37,664		
Majority		2,527	8.52	▼5.82
BN gain from PKR		Swing		?

Malaysian general election, 1999
Party	Candidate	Votes	%	∆%
PKR	Saupi Daud	18,559	57.17	▲57.17
BN	Hashim Safin	13,901	42.83	▼5.86
Total valid votes		32,460	100.00	
Total rejected ballots		778		
Unreturned ballots		41		
Turnout		33,279	77.71	▲1.97
Registered electors		42,824		
Majority		4,658	14.34	▲12.64
PKR gain from S46		Swing		?

Malaysian general election, 1995
Party	Candidate	Votes	%	∆%
S46	Ibrahim Pateh Mohammad	14,991	50.39	▼14.08
BN	Hashim Safin	14,485	48.69	▲13.87
Independent	Che Seme Abdullah	273	0.92	▲0.92
Total valid votes		29,749	100.00	
Total rejected ballots		1,164		
Unreturned ballots		71		
Turnout		30,984	75.74	▼7.33
Registered electors		40,908		
Majority		506	1.70	▼27.94
S46 hold		Swing		

Malaysian general election, 1990
Party	Candidate	Votes	%	∆%
S46	Ibrahim Pateh Mohammad	20,708	64.46	▲64.46
BN	Hashim Safin	11,183	34.82	▼21.90
Independent	Shafii Abdul Rahman	230	0.72	▲0.72
Total valid votes		32,121	100.00	
Total rejected ballots		811		
Unreturned ballots		0		
Turnout		32,932	83.07	▲3.31
Registered electors		39,644		
Majority		9,525	29.64	▲16.20
S46 gain from BN		Swing		?

Malaysian general election, 1986
Party	Candidate	Votes	%	∆%
BN	Hashim Safin	14,969	56.72	▼0.25
PAS	Abu Bakar A Rashid	11,422	43.28	▲0.25
Total valid votes		26,391	100.00	
Total rejected ballots		599		
Unreturned ballots		0		
Turnout		26,990	79.76	▼4.42
Registered electors		33,837		
Majority		3,547	13.44	▼0.50
BN hold		Swing		

Malaysian general election, 1982
Party	Candidate	Votes	%	∆%
BN	Hussein Mahmood	14,509	56.97	▲0.64
PAS	Hanafi Daud	10,959	43.03	▼0.64
Total valid votes		25,468	100.00	
Total rejected ballots		668		
Unreturned ballots		0		
Turnout		26,136	84.18	▲4.83
Registered electors		31,047		
Majority		3,550	13.94	▲1.28
BN hold		Swing		

Malaysian general election, 1978
Party	Candidate	Votes	%	∆%
BN	Hussein Mahmood	10,448	56.33	▲56.33
PAS	Hanafi Daud	8,099	43.67	▲43.67
Total valid votes		18,547	100.00	
Total rejected ballots		101		
Unreturned ballots		0		
Turnout		18,648	79.35	
Registered electors		23,500		
Majority		2,349	12.66	
BN hold		Swing		

Malaysian general election, 1974
Party	Candidate	Votes	%	∆%
On the nomination day, Mohamed Yaacob won uncontested.
BN	Mohamed Yaacob			
Total valid votes			100.00	
Total rejected ballots				
Unreturned ballots				
Turnout				
Registered electors		23,023		
Majority				
BN gain from Alliance		Swing		?

Malaysian general election, 1969
Party	Candidate	Votes	%	∆%
Alliance	Mohamed Yaacob	14,856	51.75	▲3.36
PMIP	Mustapha Ahmad	13,849	48.25	▼3.36
Total valid votes		28,705	100.00	
Total rejected ballots		827		
Unreturned ballots		0		
Turnout		29,532	75.73	▼4.28
Registered electors		38,999		
Majority		1,007	3.50	▲0.28
Alliance gain from PMIP		Swing		?

Malaysian general election, 1964
Party	Candidate	Votes	%	∆%
PMIP	Mustapha Ahmad	12,318	51.61	▼13.70
Alliance	Ishak Abdul Hamid	11,549	48.39	▲13.70
Total valid votes		23,867	100.00	
Total rejected ballots		1,135		
Unreturned ballots		0		
Turnout		25,002	80.01	▲3.81
Registered electors		31,250		
Majority		769	3.22	▼27.40
PMIP hold		Swing		

Malayan general election, 1959
Party	Candidate	Votes	%
PMIP	Othman Abdullah	12,752	65.31
Alliance	Azhari Abdul Rahman	6,774	34.69
Total valid votes		19,526	100.00
Total rejected ballots		127	
Unreturned ballots		0	
Turnout		19,653	76.20
Registered electors		25,793	
Majority		5,978	30.62
This was a new constituency created.
