= Paloh (federal constituency) =

Sarawak constituency

Defunct federal constituency
- Legislature: Dewan Rakyat
- Constituency created: 1977
- Constituency abolished: 1990
- First contested: 1978
- Last contested: 1986

Paloh was a federal constituency in Sarawak, Malaysia, that was represented in the Dewan Rakyat from 1978 to 1990.

The federal constituency was created in the 1977 redistribution and was mandated to return a single member to the Dewan Rakyat under the first past the post voting system.

== History ==
It was abolished in 1990 when it was redistributed.

=== Representation history ===
Members of Parliament for Paloh
Parliament	No	Years	Member	Party	Vote Share
Constituency renamed from Payang
5th	P142	1978-1981	Abdul Rahman Ya'kub (عبدالرحمن يعقوب)	BN (PBB)	8,581; 77.85%
5th	P142	1981-1982	Abang Abu Bakar Abang Mustapha (ابڠ ابو بكر ابڠ مصطفى)	BN (PBB)	Uncontested
6th	P142	1982-1986	Abang Abu Bakar Abang Mustapha (ابڠ ابو بكر ابڠ مصطفى)	BN (PBB)	9,512; 77.50%
7th	P165	1986-1990	Abang Abu Bakar Abang Mustapha (ابڠ ابو بكر ابڠ مصطفى)	BN (PBB)	Uncontested
Constituency abolished, renamed to Kuala Rajang

=== State constituency ===
Parliamentary constituency	State constituency					
Parliamentary constituency	1969–1978	1978–1990	1990–1999	1999–2008	2008–2016	2016−present
Paloh		Kuala Rajang				
Paloh		Matu-Daro				

=== Historical boundaries ===
State Constituency	Area
State Constituency	1977
Kuala Rajang	Balai; Belawai; Gunong Ayer; Kuala Rajang; Tanjung Manis
Matu-Daro	Daro; Kampung Sedau; Matu; Payang; Pulau Bruit

== Election results ==
Malaysian general election, 1986
Party	Candidate	Votes	%	∆%
On the nomination day, Abang Abu Bakar Abang Mustapha won uncontested.
BN	Abang Abu Bakar Abang Mustapha			
Total valid votes			100.00	
Total rejected ballots				
Unreturned ballots				
Turnout				
Registered electors				
Majority				
BN hold		Swing		

Malaysian general election, 1982
Party	Candidate	Votes	%	∆%
BN	Abang Abu Bakar Abang Mustapha	9,512	77.50	▲77.50
Independent	Udie Salleh	2,761	22.50	▲22.50
Total valid votes		12,273	100.00	
Total rejected ballots		283		
Unreturned ballots		0		
Turnout		12,556	73.03	
Registered electors		17,193		
Majority		6,751	55.00	
BN hold		Swing		

Malaysian general by-election, 4 May 1981 Upon the resignation of incumbent, Abdul Rahman Ya'kub
Party	Candidate	Votes	%	∆%
On the nomination day, Abang Abu Bakar Abang Mustapha won uncontested.
BN	Abang Abu Bakar Abang Mustapha			
Total valid votes			100.00	
Total rejected ballots				
Unreturned ballots				
Turnout				
Registered electors				
Majority				
BN hold		Swing		

Malaysian general election, 1978
Party	Candidate	Votes	%
BN	Abdul Rahman Ya'kub	8,581	77.85
Parti Anak Jati Sarawak	Lona Osman	2,441	22.15
Total valid votes		11,022	100.00
Total rejected ballots		324	
Unreturned ballots		0	
Turnout		11,346	75.11
Registered electors		15,105	
Majority		6,140	55.70
This was a new constituency created.
