= Second Najib cabinet =

Ministerial configuration in Malaysia

- 19th Cabinet of Malaysia

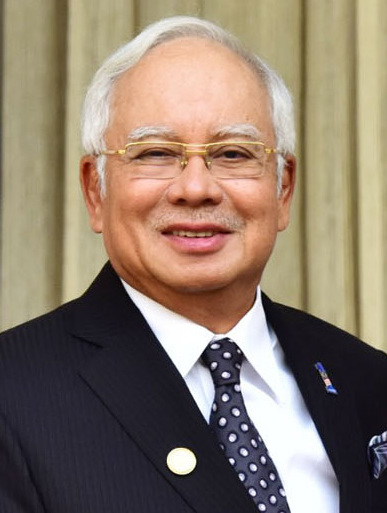
- Date formed: 16 May 2013
- Date dissolved: 9 May 2018

People and organisations
- Head of state: Tuanku Abdul Halim Muadzam Shah (2013–2016); Sultan Muhammad V (2016–2018)
- Head of government: Najib Razak
- Head of government's history: Najib Government
- Deputy head of government: Muhyiddin Yassin (2013–2015); Ahmad Zahid Hamidi (2015–2018)
- No. of ministers: 38 ministers and 34 deputy ministers
- Member parties: Barisan Nasional: UMNO; PBB; MCA; PRS; PBS; MIC; SPDP; UPKO; GERAKAN; myPPP; PBRS; SUPP
- Status in legislature: Coalition government
- Opposition cabinet: Shadow Cabinet of Malaysia
- Opposition parties: Democratic Action Party (DAP); People's Justice Party (PKR); Pan-Malaysian Islamic Party (PAS); Parti Amanah Negara (AMANAH) (2015–2018); Socialist Party of Malaysia (PSM); Sarawak People's Energy Party (TERAS) (2014–2016); Malaysian United Indigenous Party (BERSATU) (2016–2018); Sabah Heritage Party (WARISAN) (2016–2018)
- Opposition leaders: Anwar Ibrahim (2013–2015); Wan Azizah Wan Ismail (2015–2018)

History
- Election: 2013 Malaysian general election
- Legislature term: 13th Malaysian Parliament
- Budgets: 2014, 2015, 2016, 2017, 2018
- Predecessor: First Najib cabinet
- Successor: Seventh Mahathir cabinet

Najib Razak formed the second Najib cabinet after being invited by Tuanku Abdul Halim Muadzam Shah to begin a new government following the 5 May 2013 general election in Malaysia. In order to be the prime minister, Najib sworn in before the Yang di-Pertuan Agong on 6 May 2013. Prior to the election, Najib led (as prime minister) the first Najib cabinet, a coalition government that consisted of members of the component parties of Barisan Nasional.

A new cabinet was announced by Najib on 15 May 2013. It was the 19th cabinet of Malaysia formed since independence. The ministers and deputy ministers were then sworn in before Yang di-Pertuan Agong Abdul Halim on the following day. Notably, the two main ethnic Chinese-majority parties in Barisan Nasional, the Malaysian Chinese Association (MCA) and Gerakan declined to join the cabinet due to their dismal performance in the election.

On 25 June 2014, Najib announced a cabinet reshuffle, which saw the return of the MCA and Gerakan to the cabinet.

After the 1MDB scandal occurred in 2015, Deputy Prime Minister Muhyiddin Yassin, who criticized this issue, was removed from his position by Prime Minister Najib. Najib faced public demands for resignation amid allegations of corruption.

== Composition ==
Official sources: Ministers of the Federal Government (No. 2) Order 2013 [P.U. (A) 184/2013], Ministers of the Federal Government (No. 2) (Amendment) Order 2003 [P.U. (A) 324/2013], Ministers of the Federal Government (No. 2) (Amendment) (No. 2) Order 2015 [P.U. (A) 154/2014], Ministers of the Federal Government (No. 2) (Amendment) (No. 2) Order 2014 [P.U. (A) 201/2014], Ministers of the Federal Government (No. 2) (Amendment) Order 2015 [P.U. (A) 60/2015], Ministers of the Federal Government (No. 2) (Amendment) (No. 2) Order 2015 [P.U. (A) 224/2015]

=== Full members ===
The federal cabinet consisted of the following ministers:

Portfolio	Office bearer	Party	Constituency	Term start	Term end
Prime Minister	Dato' Sri Mohd. Najib Abdul Razak MP	UMNO	Pekan	6 May 2013	9 May 2018
Deputy Prime Minister	Tan Sri Dato' Haji Muhyiddin Mohd. Yassin MP	UMNO	Pagoh	16 May 2013	29 July 2015 (Note: His service was discontinued by the Prime Minister and sacked from his party.)
Deputy Prime Minister	Dato' Seri Dr. Ahmad Zahid Hamidi MP	UMNO	Bagan Datok	29 July 2015	9 May 2018
Minister in the Prime Minister's Department	Dato' Seri Dr. Shahidan Kassim MP	UMNO	Arau	16 May 2013	9 May 2018
Minister in the Prime Minister's Department	Maj. Gen. (Rtd.) Dato' Seri Jamil Khir Baharom MP	UMNO	Jerai	16 May 2013	9 May 2018
Minister in the Prime Minister's Department	Dato' Sri Idris Jala	Independent	Senator	16 May 2013	2 September 2015 (Note: His term as a Senator came to the end on this date.)
Minister in the Prime Minister's Department	Tan Sri Abdul Wahid Omar	Independent	Senator	16 May 2013	4 June 2016
Minister in the Prime Minister's Department	Datuk Paul Low Seng Kuan	Independent	Senator	16 May 2013	9 May 2018
Minister in the Prime Minister's Department	Dato' Sri Nancy Shukri MP	PBB	Batang Sadong	16 May 2013	9 May 2018
Minister in the Prime Minister's Department	Datuk Seri Panglima Joseph Kurup MP	PBRS	Pensiangan	16 May 2013	9 May 2018
Minister in the Prime Minister's Department	Datuk Joseph Entulu Belaun MP	PRS	Selangau	16 May 2013	9 May 2018
Minister in the Prime Minister's Department	Datuk Seri Ir. Dr. Wee Ka Siong MP	MCA	Ayer Hitam	27 June 2014	9 May 2018
Minister in the Prime Minister's Department	Dato' Seri Mah Siew Keong MP	Gerakan	Telok Intan	27 June 2014	27 June 2016 (Note: He was reassigned to a new portfolio.)
Minister in the Prime Minister's Department	Dato' Sri Azalina Othman Said MP	UMNO	Pengerang	29 July 2015	9 May 2018
Minister in the Prime Minister's Department	Datuk Seri Panglima Abdul Rahman Dahlan MP	UMNO	Kota Belud	27 June 2016	9 May 2018
Minister with Special Functions	Hishammuddin Hussein MP	UMNO	Sembrong	12 April 2017	9 May 2018
Minister of Finance	Dato' Sri Haji Mohd. Najib Abdul Razak MP	UMNO	Pekan	16 May 2013	9 May 2018
Minister of Finance	Dato' Seri Ahmad Husni Hanadzlah MP	UMNO	Tambun	16 May 2013	27 June 2016 (Note: He discontinued his service to the Cabinet on his will.)
Minister of Finance	Datuk Seri Johari Abdul Ghani MP	UMNO	Titiwangsa	27 June 2016	9 May 2018
Minister of Defence	Dato' Seri Hishammuddin Hussein MP	UMNO	Sembrong	16 May 2013	9 May 2018
Minister of Home Affairs	Dato' Seri Dr. Ahmad Zahid Hamidi MP	UMNO	Bagan Datok	16 May 2013	9 May 2018
Minister of International Trade and Industry	Dato' Sri Mustapa Mohamed MP	UMNO	Jeli	16 May 2013	9 May 2018
Minister of International Trade and Industry	Dato' Seri Ong Ka Chuan MP	MCA	Tanjong Malim	29 July 2015	9 May 2018
Minister of Education	Tan Sri Dato' Haji Muhyiddin Mohd. Yassin MP	UMNO	Pagoh	16 May 2013	29 July 2015
Minister of Education	Dato' Seri Idris Jusoh MP	UMNO	Besut	16 May 2013	29 July 2015
Minister of Education	Dato' Seri Diraja Mahdzir Khalid MP	UMNO	Padang Terap	29 July 2015	9 May 2018
Minister of Natural Resources and Environment	Datuk Seri Palanivel Govindasamy MP	MIC	Cameron Highlands	16 May 2013	29 July 2015 (Note: He was dismissed from the Cabinet.)
Minister of Natural Resources and Environment	Dato Sri Dr. Wan Junaidi Tuanku Jaafar MP	PBB	Santubong	29 July 2015	9 May 2018
Minister of Federal Territories	Datuk Seri Utama Tengku Adnan Tengku Mansor MP	UMNO	Putrajaya	16 May 2013	9 May 2018
Minister of Transport	Dato' Seri Hishammuddin Hussein (Acting Minister) MP (Note: The post was reserved to MCA. He became an Acting Minister throughout the vacancy.)	UMNO	Sembrong	16 May 2013	27 June 2014
Minister of Transport	Dato' Sri Liow Tiong Lai MP	MCA	Bentong	27 June 2014	9 May 2018
Minister of Agriculture and Agro-based Industry	Dato' Sri Ismail Sabri Yaakob MP	UMNO	Bera	16 May 2013	29 July 2015
Minister of Agriculture and Agro-based Industry	Dato' Sri Ahmad Shabery Cheek MP	UMNO	Kemaman	29 July 2015	9 May 2018
Minister of Health	Datuk Seri Subramaniam Sathasivam MP	MIC	Segamat	16 May 2013	9 May 2018
Minister of Tourism and Culture	Dato' Seri Mohamed Nazri Abdul Aziz MP	UMNO	Padang Rengas	16 May 2013	9 May 2018
Minister of Urban Wellbeing, Housing and Local Government	Datuk Seri Panglima Abdul Rahman Dahlan MP	UMNO	Kota Belud	16 May 2013	27 June 2016
Minister of Urban Wellbeing, Housing and Local Government	Tan Sri Noh Omar MP	UMNO	Tanjong Karang	27 June 2016	9 May 2018
Minister of Foreign Affairs	Datuk Seri Panglima Anifah Aman MP	UMNO	Kimanis	16 May 2013	9 May 2018
Minister of Higher Education	Dato' Seri Idris Jusoh MP	UMNO	Besut	29 July 2015	9 May 2018
Minister of Human Resources	Dato' Sri Richard Riot Jaem MP	SUPP	Serian	16 May 2013	9 May 2018
Minister of Domestic Trade, Co-operatives and Consumerism	Dato' Seri Hasan Malek MP	UMNO	Kuala Pilah	16 May 2013	29 July 2015
Minister of Domestic Trade, Co-operatives and Consumerism	Dato' Seri Hamzah Zainudin MP	UMNO	Larut	29 July 2015	9 May 2018
Minister of Rural and Regional Development	Datuk Seri Panglima Mohd Shafie Apdal MP	UMNO	Semporna	16 May 2013	29 July 2015
Minister of Rural and Regional Development	Dato' Sri Ismail Sabri Yaakob MP	UMNO	Bera	29 July 2015	9 May 2018
Minister of Works	Dato' Sri Haji Fadillah Yusof MP	PBB	Petra Jaya	16 May 2013	9 May 2018
Minister of Science, Technology and Innovation	Datuk Dr. Ewon Ebin MP	UPKO	Ranau	16 May 2013	29 July 2015
Minister of Science, Technology and Innovation	Datuk Seri Panglima Wilfred Madius Tangau MP	UPKO	Tuaran	29 July 2015	9 May 2018
Minister of Energy, Green Technology and Water	Datuk Seri Panglima Maximus Johnity Ongkili MP	PBS	Kota Marudu	16 May 2013	9 May 2018
Minister for Plantation Industries and Commodities	Datuk Amar Douglas Uggah Embas MP	PBB	Betong	16 May 2013	12 May 2016 (Note: He stopped serving the Cabinet following his appointment as the Deputy Chief Minister of Sarawak.)
Minister for Plantation Industries and Commodities	Dato' Sri Nancy Shukri MP (Acting Minister) (Note: She became the Acting Minister following the vacancy of the Minister's seat.)	PBB	Batang Sadong	12 May 2016	27 June 2016
Minister for Plantation Industries and Commodities	Dato' Seri Mah Siew Keong MP	Gerakan	Telok Intan	27 June 2016	9 May 2018
Minister of Women, Family and Community Development	Dato Sri Hajah Rohani Abdul Karim MP	PBB	Batang Lupar	16 May 2013	9 May 2018
Minister of Youth and Sports	Brig. Gen. Khairy Jamaluddin Abu Bakar MP	UMNO	Rembau	16 May 2013	9 May 2018
Minister of Communication and Multimedia	Dato' Sri Ahmad Shabery Cheek MP	UMNO	Kemaman	16 May 2013	29 July 2015
Minister of Communication and Multimedia	Datuk Seri Panglima Dr. Mohd. Salleh Said MP	UMNO	Senator	29 July 2015	9 May 2018

=== Deputy ministers ===
Portfolio	Office bearer	Party	Constituency	Term start	Term end
Deputy Minister in the Prime Minister's Department	Datuk Seri Razali Ibrahim MP	UMNO	Muar	16 May 2013	9 May 2018
Deputy Minister in the Prime Minister's Department	Waytha Moorthy Ponnusamy	HINDRAF	Senator	16 May 2013	5 February 2014
Deputy Minister in the Prime Minister's Department	Dato' Dr. Asyraf Wajdi Dusuki	UMNO	Senator	29 July 2015	9 May 2018
Deputy Minister in the Prime Minister's Department	Dato' Sri Devamany Krishnasamy	MIC	Senator	27 June 2016	9 May 2018
Deputy Minister of Finance	Datuk Ahmad Maslan MP	UMNO	Pontian	16 May 2013	29 July 2015
Deputy Minister of Finance	Datuk Chua Tee Yong MP	MCA	Labis	27 June 2014	27 June 2016
Deputy Minister of Finance	Dato' Johari Abdul Ghani MP	UMNO	Titiwangsa	29 July 2015	27 June 2016
Deputy Minister of Finance	Dato' Wira Othman Aziz MP	UMNO	Jerlun	27 June 2016	9 May 2018
Deputy Minister of Finance	Dato' Lee Chee Leong	MCA	Senator	27 June 2016	9 May 2018
Deputy Minister of Defence	Datuk Haji Abdul Rahim Bakri MP	UMNO	Kudat	16 May 2013	29 July 2015
Deputy Minister of Defence	Dato' Sri Mohd. Johari Baharum MP	UMNO	Kubang Pasu	29 July 2015	9 May 2018
Deputy Minister of Home Affairs	Dato Sri Dr. Wan Junaidi Tuanku Jaafar MP	PBB	Santubong	16 May 2013	29 July 2015 (Note: He received promotion as a Minister.)
Deputy Minister of Home Affairs	Datuk Nur Jazlan Mohamed MP	UMNO	Pulai	29 July 2015	9 May 2018
Deputy Minister of Home Affairs	Dato' Masir Kujat MP	PRS	Sri Aman	29 July 2015	9 May 2018
Deputy Minister of International Trade and Industry	Datuk Ir. Haji Hamim Samuri MP	UMNO	Ledang	16 May 2013	29 July 2015
Deputy Minister of International Trade and Industry	Dato' Lee Chee Leong	MCA	Senator	27 June 2014	27 June 2016
Deputy Minister of International Trade and Industry	Datuk Seri Ahmad Maslan MP	UMNO	Pontian	29 July 2015	9 May 2018
Deputy Minister of International Trade and Industry	Datuk Chua Tee Yong MP	MCA	Labis	27 June 2016	9 May 2018
Deputy Minister of Education	Datuk Kamalanathan Panchanathan MP	MIC	Hulu Selangor	16 May 2013	9 May 2018
Deputy Minister of Education	Datuk Mary Yap Kain Ching MP	PBS	Tawau	16 May 2013	29 July 2015
Deputy Minister of Education	Datuk Chong Sin Woon	MCA	Senator	29 July 2015	9 May 2018
Deputy Minister of Natural Resources and Environment	Dato' Sri Dr. James Dawos Mamit MP	PBB	Mambong	16 May 2013	29 July 2015
Deputy Minister of Natural Resources and Environment	Datuk Hamim Samuri MP	UMNO	Ledang	29 July 2015	9 May 2018
Deputy Minister of Federal Territories	Dato' Loga Bala Mohan Jaganathan	myPPP	Senator	16 May 2013	9 May 2018
Deputy Minister of Transport	Datuk Abdul Aziz Kaprawi MP	UMNO	Sri Gading	16 May 2013	9 May 2018
Deputy Minister of Agriculture and Agro-based Industry	Dato' Sri Tajuddin Abdul Rahman MP	UMNO	Pasir Salak	16 May 2013	9 May 2018
Deputy Minister of Agriculture and Agro-based Industry	Dato' Anthony Nogeh Gumbek MP	PDP	Mas Gading	29 July 2015	9 May 2018
Deputy Minister of Health	Dato' Seri Dr. Hilmi Yahaya MP	UMNO	Balik Pulau	16 May 2013	9 May 2018
Deputy Minister of Tourism and Culture	Datuk Wira Mas Ermieyati Samsudin MP	UMNO	Masjid Tanah	29 July 2015	9 May 2018
Deputy Minister of Urban Wellbeing, Housing, and Local Government	Datuk Wira Halimah Mohamed Sadique MP	UMNO	Tenggara	16 May 2013	9 May 2018
Deputy Minister of Foreign Affairs	Dato' Seri Hamzah Zainudin MP	UMNO	Larut	16 May 2013	29 July 2015
Deputy Minister of Foreign Affairs	Dato' Sri Reezal Merican Naina Merican MP	UMNO	Kepala Batas	29 July 2015	9 May 2018
Deputy Minister of Higher Education	Datuk Mary Yap Kain Ching MP	PBS	Tawau	29 July 2015	9 May 2018
Deputy Minister of Human Resources	Dato' Sri Ismail Abdul Muttalib MP	UMNO	Maran	16 May 2013	9 May 2018
Deputy Minister of Domestic Trade, Co-operatives and Consumerism	Dato' Seri Ahmad Bashah Md. Hanipah	UMNO	Senator	16 May 2013	3 February 2016 (Note: He stopped being a Deputy Minister following his appointment as the Menteri Besar of Kedah.)
Deputy Minister of Domestic Trade, Co-operatives and Consumerism	Dato Henry Sum Agong MP	PBB	Lawas	27 June 2016	9 May 2018
Deputy Minister of Rural and Regional Development	Datuk Alexander Nanta Linggi MP	PBB	Kapit	16 May 2013	9 May 2018
Deputy Minister of Rural and Regional Development	Datuk Wira Ahmad Jazlan Yaakub MP	UMNO	Machang	29 July 2015	9 May 2018
Deputy Minister of Works	Datuk Rosnah Abdul Rashid Shirlin MP	UMNO	Papar	16 May 2013	9 May 2018
Deputy Minister of Science, Technology and Innovation	Datuk Wira Dr. Abu Bakar Mohamad Diah MP	UMNO	Tangga Batu	16 May 2013	9 May 2018
Deputy Minister of Energy, Green Technology and Water	Dato' Seri Diraja Mahdzir Khalid MP	UMNO	Padang Terap	16 May 2013	29 July 2015
Deputy Minister of Energy, Green Technology and Water	Dato' Sri James Dawos Mamit MP	PBB	Mambong	29 July 2015	9 May 2018
Deputy Minister of Plantation Industries and Commodities	Dato' Noriah Kasnon MP	UMNO	Sungai Besar	16 May 2013	5 May 2016 (Note: The post was vacant following her death from a helicopter crash in Sarawak.)
Deputy Minister of Plantation Industries and Commodities	Datuk Datu Nasrun Datu Mansur MP	UMNO	Silam	27 June 2016	9 May 2018
Deputy Minister of Women, Family and Community Development	Datuk Azizah Mohd. Dun MP	UMNO	Beaufort	16 May 2013	9 May 2018
Deputy Minister of Women, Family and Community Development	Datin Paduka Chew Mei Fun	MCA	Senator	27 June 2014	9 May 2018
Deputy Minister of Youth and Sports	Datuk Seri Saravanan Murugan MP	MIC	Tapah	16 May 2013	9 May 2018
Deputy Minister of Communication and Multimedia	Dato' Sri Jailani Johari MP	UMNO	Hulu Terengganu	16 May 2013	9 May 2018

== See also ==
- Members of the Dewan Rakyat, 13th Malaysian Parliament
- Shadow Cabinet of Malaysia
