= Cabinet of Malaysia =

Council of ministers who are accountable collectively to the Parliament

The Cabinet of Malaysia (Malay: Jemaah Menteri Malaysia) is the executive branch of the Government of Malaysia. Led by the Prime Minister, the cabinet is a council of ministers who are accountable collectively to the Parliament. According to the Article 43 of the Federal Constitution, members of the Cabinet can only be selected from members of either houses of Parliament. Formally, the Yang di-Pertuan Agong appoints all Ministers on the advice of the Prime Minister. The constitution is amended by repealing the Clause (8) of Article 43, enabling a person who is a member of State Legislative Assembly to continue to serve even while serving as a minister or deputy minister in the cabinet. Ministers other than the Prime Minister shall hold office during the pleasure of the Yang di-Pertuan Agong, unless the appointment of any Minister shall have been revoked by the Yang di-Pertuan Agong on the advice of the Prime Minister but any Minister may resign from office. In practice, the Yang di-Pertuan Agong is obliged to follow the advice of the Prime Minister on the appointment and dismissal of ministers.

== Cabinet appointments ==
Members of the Cabinet must be members of either house of Parliament. Most ministers are appointed from the lower house, the Dewan Rakyat, although a few are appointed from the upper house, the Dewan Negara. The Prime Minister must be a member of the Dewan Rakyat. Although Deputy Ministers and Parliamentary Secretaries may be appointed to each portfolio, they are not included in the Cabinet. The Cabinet meets weekly, every Wednesday. After the position of Parliamentary Secretary was removed and partial live telecasts of Parliament proceedings began in 2008, Cabinet meetings were moved to Fridays whenever Parliament sat, so as to allow Ministers to personally answer questions during Question Time in Parliament.

== Cabinet composition ==
The composition of the Cabinet, and the number of portfolios depends mainly on the wishes of the Prime Minister at the time. However, the post of Finance Minister was considered so important as to be a necessity, and as a result was incorporated by the Minister of Finance (Incorporation) Act 1957 (Act 375). The position of Deputy Prime Minister is one that exists by convention, and as a result a Prime Minister could theoretically form a Cabinet without a Deputy.

Deputy ministers exist for each portfolio, although they are not considered members of the Cabinet. The position of Deputy Minister was created by constitutional amendment in 1960. The office of parliamentary secretary for each ministry exists but none were appointed after the 2008 Malaysian general election. Parliamentary secretaries were provided for by an amendment in 1963. Deputy ministers and parliamentary secretaries are also appointed from members of Parliament, and deputise for the ministers in government ministries and in Parliament respectively. An additional office, that of the Political Secretary, exists. Political Secretaries need not be members of Parliament. Before taking office, all members of the Cabinet, Deputy Ministers, Parliamentary Secretaries, and Political Secretaries take an oath of secrecy concerning the proceedings of the Cabinet.

== Functions of cabinet ==
An outline of the functions of the Cabinet are as follows:

- To formulate national economic policies and development programmes.
  - The Cabinet is responsible to formulate various development programs and projects for the development of the country. Examples are the New Economic Policy (NEP), the National Development Policy (NDP), and the National Vision Policy (NVP).
- To set the budget and finance of the country.
  - The government is allowed to generate revenues from the people through the collection of taxes, fines, summons, custom duties, fees, etc.
  - The government is allowed to plan for the various development programs, and also to allocate the resources for these development plans and programs.
- As an arena for suggestions, debates, and criticisms.
  - The Cabinet is allowed to discuss almost any issues of national interests, except those that touch on the special rights of the Malays, Bumiputeras and/or royal privileges. Article 153 (1): It shall be the responsibility of the Yang di-Pertuan Agong to safeguard the special position of the Malays and Natives of any of the States of Sabah and Sarawak, and the legitimate interests of other communities in accordance with the provisions of this Article.
- To propose and amend the law.
  - Law is proposed by the Executive and introduce in Parliament with the 1st, 2nd, and 3rd readings for approval.
  - Most provisions for the amendments of the constitution requires a 2/3 majority of the total number of members from both of the Houses (Dewan Negara and Dewan Rakyat)
  - The bill must be presented to the Yang di-Pertuan Agong for the final assent.

== List of cabinets ==
23 cabinets have taken place in Malaysia since 1957 headed by nine Prime Ministers.

No.	Name of cabinet	Head of cabinet	Period of office	Composition
1	Rahman I	Tunku Abdul Rahman	31 August 1957 – 19 August 1959	13 ministers
2	Rahman II	Tunku Abdul Rahman	22 August 1959 – 24 April 1964	16 ministers; 6 assistant ministers
3	Rahman III	Tunku Abdul Rahman	25 April 1964 – 1969	20 ministers; 5 assistant ministers; 4 parliamentary secretaries
4	Rahman IV	Tunku Abdul Rahman	1969 – 21 December 1970	9 ministers
5	Razak I	Abdul Razak Hussein	22 December 1970 – 24 August 1974	22 ministers; 7 deputy ministers; 5 parliamentary secretaries
6	Razak II	Abdul Razak Hussein	25 August 1974 – 14 January 1976	20 ministers; 16 deputy ministers; 9 parliamentary secretaries
7	Hussein I	Hussein Onn	15 January 1976 – 8 July 1978	22 ministers; 20 deputy ministers; 8 parliamentary secretaries
8	Hussein II	Hussein Onn	9 July 1978 – 15 July 1981	23 ministers; 22 deputy ministers; 9 parliamentary secretaries
9	Mahathir I	Mahathir Mohamad	16 July 1981 – 21 April 1982	24 ministers; 22 deputy ministers; 10 parliamentary secretaries
10	Mahathir II	Mahathir Mohamad	22 April 1982 – 2 August 1986	24 ministers; 29 deputy ministers; 9 parliamentary secretaries
11	Mahathir III	Mahathir Mohamad	11 August 1986 – 26 October 1990	24 ministers; 31 deputy ministers; 10 parliamentary secretaries
12	Mahathir IV	Mahathir Mohamad	22 October 1990 – 3 May 1995	26 ministers; 30 deputy ministers; 14 parliamentary secretaries
13	Mahathir V	Mahathir Mohamad	4 May 1995 – 14 December 1999	30 ministers; 27 deputy ministers; 14 parliamentary secretaries
14	Mahathir VI	Mahathir Mohamad	15 December 1999 – 2 November 2003	30 ministers; 28 deputy ministers; 16 parliamentary secretaries
15	Abdullah I	Abdullah Ahmad Badawi	3 November 2003 – 26 March 2004	31 ministers; 29 deputy ministers; 16 parliamentary secretaries
16	Abdullah II	Abdullah Ahmad Badawi	27 March 2004 – 18 March 2008	34 ministers; 39 deputy ministers; 20 parliamentary secretaries
17	Abdullah III	Abdullah Ahmad Badawi	19 March 2008 – 9 April 2009	32 ministers; 38 deputy ministers
18	Najib I	Mohammad Najib Abdul Razak	10 April 2009 – 15 May 2013	33 ministers; 40 deputy ministers
19	Najib II	Mohammad Najib Abdul Razak	16 May 2013 – 9 May 2018	38 ministers; 34 deputy ministers
20	Mahathir VII	Mahathir Mohamad	10 May 2018 – 24 February 2020	28 ministers; 27 deputy ministers
21	Muhyiddin	Muhyiddin Yassin	1 March 2020 – 16 August 2021	32 ministers; 38 deputy ministers
22	Ismail Sabri	Ismail Sabri Yaakob	21 August 2021 – 10 October 2022	32 ministers; 38 deputy ministers
23	Anwar	Anwar Ibrahim	24 November 2022 – present	31 ministers; 29 deputy ministers

== Current Cabinet ==
The current cabinet, led by Prime Minister Anwar Ibrahim, succeeds the Ismail Sabri cabinet. Anwar formed his cabinet following the 2022 General Election.

As of 17 December 2025, the makeup of the current Cabinet is as follows:

Anwar Ibrahim cabinet
Minister	Office(s)	Department	Took office
Anwar Ibrahim; MP for Tambun	Prime Minister	Prime Minister's Department	24 November 2022
Anwar Ibrahim; MP for Tambun	Minister of Finance	Ministry of Finance	3 December 2022
Dr. Ahmad Zahid Hamidi; MP for Bagan Datuk	Deputy Prime Minister	Prime Minister's Department	3 December 2022
Dr. Ahmad Zahid Hamidi; MP for Bagan Datuk	Minister of Rural and Regional Development	Ministry of Rural and Regional Development	3 December 2022
Fadillah Yusof; MP for Petra Jaya	Deputy Prime Minister	Prime Minister's Department	3 December 2022
Fadillah Yusof; MP for Petra Jaya	Minister of Energy Transition and Water Transformation	Ministry of Energy Transition and Water Transformation	12 December 2023
Azalina Othman Said; MP for Pengerang	Minister in the Prime Minister's Department (Law and Institutional Reform)	Prime Minister's Department	3 December 2022
Hannah Yeoh; MP for Segambut	Minister in the Prime Minister's Department (Federal Territories)	Prime Minister's Department	17 December 2025
Mustapha Sakmud; MP for Sepanggar	Minister in the Prime Minister's Department (Sabah and Sarawak)	Prime Minister's Department	17 December 2025
Dr. Zulkifli Hasan; Senator	Minister in the Prime Minister's Department (Religious Affairs)	Prime Minister's Department	17 December 2025
Amir Hamzah Azizan; Senator	Minister of Finance II	Ministry of Finance	12 December 2023
Anthony Loke; MP for Seremban	Minister of Transport	Ministry of Transport	3 December 2022
Mohamad Sabu; MP for Kota Raja	Minister of Agriculture and Food Security	Ministry of Agriculture and Food Security	3 December 2022
Nga Kor Ming; MP for Teluk Intan	Minister of Housing and Local Government	Ministry of Housing and Local Government	3 December 2022
Mohamad Hasan; MP for Rembau	Minister of Foreign Affairs	Ministry of Foreign Affairs	12 December 2023
Alexander Nanta Linggi; MP for Kapit	Minister of Works	Ministry of Works	3 December 2022
Saifuddin Nasution Ismail; Senator	Minister of Home Affairs	Ministry of Home Affairs	3 December 2022
Mohamed Khaled Nordin; MP for Kota Tinggi	Minister of Defence	Ministry of Defence	12 December 2023
Chang Lih Kang; MP for Tanjong Malim	Minister of Science, Technology and Innovation	Ministry of Science, Technology and Innovation	3 December 2022
Nancy Shukri; MP for Santubong	Minister of Women, Family and Community Development	Ministry of Women, Family and Community Development	3 December 2022
Dr. Zambry Abdul Kadir; Senator	Minister of Higher Education	Ministry of Higher Education	12 December 2023
Tiong King Sing; MP for Bintulu	Minister of Tourism, Arts and Culture	Ministry of Tourism, Arts and Culture	3 December 2022
Fahmi Fadzil; MP for Lembah Pantai	Minister of Communications	Ministry of Communications	12 December 2023
Fadhlina Sidek; MP for Nibong Tebal	Minister of Education	Ministry of Education	3 December 2022
Aaron Ago Dagang; MP for Kanowit	Minister of National Unity	Ministry of National Unity	3 December 2022
Armizan Mohd Ali; MP for Papar	Minister of Domestic Trade and Cost of Living	Ministry of Domestic Trade and Cost of Living	12 December 2023
Johari Abdul Ghani; MP for Titiwangsa	Minister of Investment, Trade and Industry	Ministry of Investment, Trade and Industry	17 December 2025
Gobind Singh Deo; MP for Damansara	Minister of Digital	Ministry of Digital	12 December 2023
Dr. Dzulkefly Ahmad; MP for Kuala Selangor	Minister of Health	Ministry of Health	12 December 2023
Steven Sim Chee Keong; MP for Bukit Mertajam	Minister of Entrepreneur and Cooperatives Development	Ministry of Entrepreneur and Cooperatives Development	17 December 2025
Akmal Nasir; MP for Johor Bahru	Minister of Economy	Ministry of Economy	17 December 2025
Arthur Joseph Kurup; MP for Pensiangan	Minister of Natural Resources and Environmental Sustainability	Ministry of Natural Resources and Environmental Sustainability	17 December 2025
Dr. Noraini Ahmad; MP for Parit Sulong	Minister of Plantation and Commodities	Ministry of Plantation and Commodities	17 December 2025
Ramanan Ramakrishnan; MP for Sungai Buloh	Minister of Human Resources	Ministry of Human Resources	17 December 2025
Dr. Mohammed Taufiq Johari; MP for Sungai Petani	Minister of Youth and Sports	Ministry of Youth and Sports	17 December 2025

== Inactive portfolios ==
Ministry of Agriculture and Food Security

- Ministry of Agriculture
- Ministry of Agriculture and Agro-based Industry
- Ministry of Agriculture and Co-operatives
- Ministry of Agriculture and Fisheries
- Ministry of Agriculture and Food Industries
- Ministry of Agriculture and Lands
- Ministry of Agriculture and Rural Development

Ministry of Communications

- Ministry of Communications
- Ministry of Communications and Multimedia
- Ministry of Communications, Telecommunications and Posts
- Ministry of Information
- Ministry of Information and Broadcasting
- Ministry of Information, Communications and Culture
- Ministry of Information, Communications, Arts and Culture

Ministry of Digital

- (N/A)

Ministry of Domestic Trade and Costs of Living

- Ministry of Domestic Trade and Consumer Affairs
- Ministry of Domestic Trade, Co-operatives and Consumerism

Ministry of Economy

- Ministry of Economic Affairs
- Ministry of General Planning and Sosio-Economic Research

Ministry of Energy Transition and Water Transformation

- Ministry of Energy, Communications and Multimedia
- Ministry of Energy, Science, Technology, Environment and Climate Change
- Ministry of Energy, Technology and Research
- Ministry of Energy, Telecommunications and Posts
- Ministry of Energy, Water and Communications
- Ministry of Energy Transition and Public Utilities

Ministry of Entrepreneur Development and Co-operatives

- Ministry of Coordination of Public Corporations
- Ministry of Public Enterprises
- Ministry of Entrepreneur Development

Ministry of Foreign Affairs

- Ministry of External Affairs

Ministry of Finance

- (N/A)

Ministry of Home Affairs

- Ministry of Home Affairs and Justice
- Ministry of Internal Security
- Ministry of Justice
- Ministry of Law
- Ministry of the Interior

Ministry of Human Resources

- Ministry of Labour
- Ministry of Labour and Manpower
- Ministry of Labour and Social Welfare

Ministry of Investment, Trade and Industry

- Ministry of Commerce and Industry
- Ministry of International Trade and Industry
- Ministry of Trade and Industry

Ministry of Natural Resources and Environmental Sustainability

- Ministry of Environment and Water
- Ministry of Lands and Co-operatives Development
- Ministry of Lands and Mines
- Ministry of Lands Development
- Ministry of Lands and Regional Development
- Ministry of Natural Resources
- Ministry of Natural Resources, Environment and Climate Change

Ministry of Plantation Industries and Commodities

- Ministry of Primary Industries

Ministry of Rural and Regional Development

- Ministry of National and Rural Development
- Ministry of Rural Development
- Ministry of Rural Economy Development

Ministry of Science and Technology

- Ministry of Science, Technology and Environment
- Ministry of Science, Technology and Innovation (Malaysia)
- Ministry of Technology, Research and Local Government

Ministry of Tourism

- Ministry of Arts, Culture and Heritage
- Ministry of Culture and Tourism
- Ministry of Culture, Arts and Tourism
- Ministry of National Unity and Community Development
- Ministry of National Unity, Culture, Arts and Heritage
- Ministry of Tourism, Arts and Culture
- Ministry of Tourism and Culture

Ministry of Local Government Development

- Ministry of Federal Territories
- Ministry of Federal Territories and Urban Wellbeing
- Ministry of Housing and Local Government
- Ministry of Housing and New Villages
- Ministry of Housing and Villages Development
- Ministry of Local Government and Environment
- Ministry of Local Government and Federal Territories
- Ministry of Local Government, Housing and Town Planning
- Ministry of Technology, Research and Coordination of New Villages
- Ministry of Territories
- Ministry of Urban Wellbeing, Housing and Local Government
- Ministry of Federal Territories
- Ministry of Federal Territories and Urban Wellbeing

Ministry of Women, Family and Community Development

- Ministry of General Welfare
- Ministry of National Unity
- Ministry of Social Welfare
- Ministry of Welfare Services
- Ministry of Women and Family Development

Ministry of Works

- Ministry of Works and Energy
- Ministry of Works and Public Amenities
- Ministry of Works and Transport
- Ministry of Works, Posts and Telecommunications

Ministry of Youth and Sports

- Ministry of Culture, Youth and Sports
- Ministry of Youth, Culture and Sports

Ministry of Health

- Ministry of Health and Social Welfare

Minister in the Prime Minister's Department

- Minister with Special Functions
- Minister with Special Functions for Foreign Affairs
- Minister without Portfolio

Others

- Chief Minister of Malaya
- Ministry of Sabah Affairs
- Ministry of Sarawak Affairs

== See also ==
- Shadow Cabinet of Malaysia
- Prime Minister's Department (Malaysia)
- List of female cabinet ministers of Malaysia
- List of federal ministries and agencies in Malaysia
