= Second Mahathir cabinet =

- 10th Cabinet of Malaysia

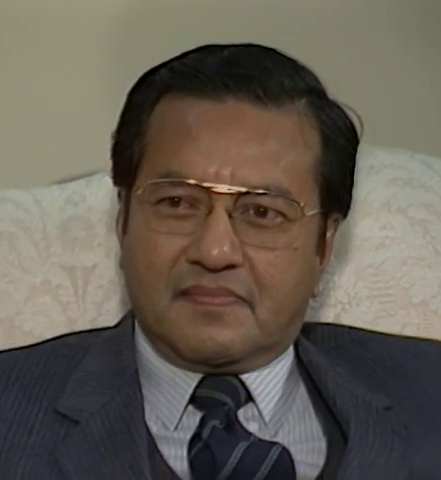

People and organisations
- Head of state: Tuanku Ahmad Shah (1982–1984); Tuanku Iskandar (1984–1986)
- Head of government: Mahathir Mohamad
- Deputy head of government: Musa Hitam (1982–1986); Abdul Ghafar Baba (1986)
- Member parties: Barisan Nasional: United Malays National Organisation; Malaysian Chinese Association; United Sabah National Organisation; Malaysian People's Movement Party; United Traditional Bumiputera Party; Sabah People's United Front; Sarawak United Peoples' Party; Sarawak National Party; Malaysian Indian Congress
- Status in legislature: Coalition government
- Opposition parties: Democratic Action Party; Pan-Malaysian Islamic Party; United Sabah Party
- Opposition leader: Lim Kit Siang

History
- Election: 1982 Malaysian general election
- Outgoing election: 1986 Malaysian general election
- Legislature term: 6th Malaysian Parliament
- Budgets: 1983, 1984, 1985, 1986
- Predecessor: First Mahathir cabinet
- Successor: Third Mahathir cabinet

Mahathir Mohamad formed the second Mahathir cabinet after being invited by Tuanku Ahmad Shah to begin a new government following the 22 April 1982 general election in Malaysia. Prior to the election, Mahathir led (as Prime Minister) the first Mahathir cabinet, a coalition government that consisted of members of the component parties of Barisan Nasional. It was the 10th cabinet of Malaysia formed since independence.

This is a list of the members of the second cabinet of the fourth Prime Minister of Malaysia, Mahathir Mohamad.

== Composition ==
=== Full members ===
The federal cabinet consisted of the following ministers:

Portfolio	Office bearer	Party	Constituency	Term start	Term end
Prime Minister	Dato' Seri Dr. Mahathir Mohamad MP	UMNO	Kubang Pasu	30 April 1982	10 August 1986
Minister of Defence	Dato' Seri Dr. Mahathir Mohamad MP	UMNO	Kubang Pasu	30 April 1982	10 August 1986
Deputy Prime Minister	Dato' Musa Hitam MP	UMNO	Panti	30 April 1982	16 March 1986
Deputy Prime Minister	Abdul Ghafar Baba MP	UMNO	Jasin	10 May 1986	10 August 1986
Minister in the Prime Minister's Department	Senator Mohamed Nasir	BERJASA	Senator	30 April 1982	2 June 1983
Minister in the Prime Minister's Department	Dato' Abdullah Ahmad Badawi MP	UMNO	Kepala Batas	30 April 1982	16 July 1984
Minister in the Prime Minister's Department	Datuk James Peter Ongkili MP	BERJAYA	Tuaran	2 June 1983	10 August 1986
Minister in the Prime Minister's Department	Dato' Mohd Khalil Yaakob MP	UMNO	Maran	16 July 1984	10 August 1986
Minister of Transport	Dato' Lee San Choon MP	MCA	Seremban	30 April 1982	31 March 1983
Minister of Transport	Tan Sri Chong Hon Nyan MP	MCA	Batu Berendam	2 June 1983	6 January 1986
Minister of Transport	Dato' Ling Liong Sik MP	MCA	Mata Kuching	7 January 1986	10 August 1986
Minister of Home Affairs	Dato' Musa Hitam MP	UMNO	Panti	30 April 1982	16 March 1986
Minister of Home Affairs	Dato' Seri Dr. Mahathir Mohamad MP	UMNO	Kubang Pasu	17 March 1986	10 August 1986
Minister of Foreign Affairs	Tan Sri Ghazali Shafie MP	UMNO	Lipis	30 April 1982	16 July 1984
Minister of Foreign Affairs	Dato' Sri Tengku Ahmad Rithauddeen Ismail MP	UMNO	Kota Bharu	16 July 1984	10 August 1986
Minister of General Welfare	Datin Paduka Aishah Ghani MP	UMNO	Kuala Langat	30 April 1982	16 July 1984
Minister of General Welfare	Dato' Abu Hassan Omar MP	UMNO	Kuala Selangor	16 July 1984	10 August 1986
Minister of Commerce and Industry	Dato' Sri Tengku Ahmad Rithauddeen Tengku Ismail MP	UMNO	Kota Bharu	30 April 1982	16 July 1984
Minister of Commerce and Industry	Tan Sri Tengku Razaleigh Hamzah MP	UMNO	Ulu Kelantan	16 July 1984	10 August 1986
Minister of Finance	Tan Sri Tengku Razaleigh Hamzah MP	UMNO	Ulu Kelantan	30 April 1982	16 July 1984
Minister of Finance	Daim Zainuddin MP	UMNO	Kuala Muda	16 July 1984	10 August 1986
Minister of Justice	Datuk James Peter Ongkili MP	BERJAYA	Tuaran	16 July 1984	10 August 1986
Minister of Health	Tan Sri Chong Hon Nyan MP	MCA	Batu Berendam	30 April 1982	2 June 1983
Minister of Health	Chin Hon Ngian MP	MCA	Renggam	2 June 1983	6 January 1986
Minister of Health	Mak Hon Kam MP	MCA	Tanjong Malim	6 January 1986	10 August 1986
Minister of Primary Industries	Paul Leong Khee Seong MP	GERAKAN	Taiping	30 April 1982	10 August 1986
Minister of Agriculture	Abdul Manan Othman MP	UMNO	Kuala Trengganu	30 April 1982	16 July 1984
Minister of Agriculture	Anwar Ibrahim MP	UMNO	Permatang Pauh	16 July 1984	10 August 1986
Minister of Energy, Telecommunications and Posts	Dato' Leo Moggie Irok MP	SNAP	Kanowit	30 April 1982	10 August 1986
Minister of Housing and Local Government	Dato' Neo Yee Pan MP	MCA	Muar	30 April 1982	15 August 1985
Minister of Housing and Local Government	Dato' Chan Siang Sun MP	MCA	Bentong	7 January 1986	10 August 1986
Minister of Works and Public Amenities	Dato' Samy Vellu MP	MIC	Sungei Siput	30 April 1982	7 June 1983
Minister of Works	Dato' Samy Vellu MP	MIC	Sungei Siput	8 June 1983	10 August 1986
Minister of Culture, Youth and Sports	Mokhtar Hashim MP	UMNO	Tampin	30 April 1982	2 June 1983
Minister of Culture, Youth and Sports	Anwar Ibrahim MP	UMNO	Permatang Pauh	2 June 1983	16 July 1984
Minister of Culture, Youth and Sports	Dato' Sulaiman Daud MP	PBB	Santubong	16 July 1984	10 August 1986
Minister of Public Enterprises	Datin Paduka Rafidah Aziz MP	UMNO	Kuala Kangsar	30 April 1982	10 August 1986
Minister of Education	Dato' Sulaiman Daud MP	PBB	Santubong	30 April 1982	16 July 1984
Minister of Education	Dato' Abdullah Ahmad Badawi MP	UMNO	Kepala Batas	16 July 1984	10 August 1986
Minister of Federal Territories	Pengiran Othman Pengiran Rauf MP	BERJAYA	Kimanis	30 April 1982	2 June 1983
Minister of Federal Territories	Dato' Shahrir Abdul Samad MP	UMNO	Johore Bahru	2 June 1983	10 August 1986
Minister of National and Rural Development	Datuk Seri Sanusi Junid MP	UMNO	Jerlun-Langkawi	30 April 1982	10 August 1986
Minister of Lands and Regional Development	Dato' Rais Yatim MP	UMNO	Jelebu	30 April 1982	16 July 1984
Minister of Lands and Regional Development	Datuk Seri Mohd. Adib Mohd. Adam MP	UMNO	Alor Gajah	16 July 1984	10 August 1986
Minister of Labour and Manpower	Dato' Mak Hon Kam MP	MCA	Tanjong Malim	30 April 1982	2 June 1983
Minister of Labour	Dato' Mak Hon Kam MP	MCA	Tanjong Malim	2 June 1983	6 January 1986
Minister of Labour	Dato' Lee Kim Sai MP	MCA	Ulu Selangor	6 January 1986	10 August 1986
Minister of Information	Datuk Seri Mohd. Adib Mohd. Adam MP	UMNO	Alor Gajah	30 April 1982	16 July 1984
Minister of Information	Dato' Rais Yatim MP	UMNO	Jelebu	16 July 1984	10 August 1986
Minister of Science, Technology and Environment	Datuk Amar Stephen Yong Kuet Tze MP	SUPP	Padawan	15 May 1982	10 August 1986

=== Deputy ministers ===
Portfolio	Office bearer	Party	Constituency	Term start	Term end
Deputy Minister in the Prime Minister's Department	Anwar Ibrahim MP	UMNO	Permatang Pauh	30 April 1982	2 June 1983
Deputy Minister in the Prime Minister's Department	Goh Cheng Teik MP	GERAKAN	Nibong Tebal	30 April 1982	2 June 1983
Deputy Minister in the Prime Minister's Department	Dato' Suhaimi Kamaruddin MP	UMNO	Sepang	30 April 1982	2 June 1983
Deputy Minister in the Prime Minister's Department	Shariffah Dorah Syed Mohammed MP	UMNO	Semerah	30 April 1982	10 August 1986
Deputy Minister in the Prime Minister's Department	Mohamed Yusof Mohamed Noor	UMNO	Senator	16 July 1984	10 August 1986
Deputy Minister in the Prime Minister's Department	Mohd Radzi Sheikh Ahmad MP	UMNO	Kangar	2 June 1983	16 July 1984
Deputy Minister in the Prime Minister's Department	Dato' Lee Kim Sai MP	MCA	Ulu Selangor	2 June 1983	16 July 1984
Deputy Minister in the Prime Minister's Department	Dato' Lee Kim Sai MP	MCA	Ulu Selangor	25 March 1985	7 January 1986
Deputy Minister in the Prime Minister's Department	Tan Tiong Hong MP	MCA	Raub	7 January 1986	10 August 1986
Deputy Minister of Information	Dato' Rahmah Othman MP	UMNO	Selayang	30 April 1982	16 July 1984
Deputy Minister of Information	Dato' Chan Siang Sun MP	MCA	Bentong	30 April 1982	7 January 1986
Deputy Minister of Information	Mohd. Kassim Ahmed MP	UMNO	Machang	16 July 1984	10 August 1986
Deputy Minister of Information	Dato' Ng Cheng Kuai MP	MCA	Lumut	7 January 1986	10 August 1986
Deputy Minister of Health	K. Pathmanaban MP	MIC	Telok Kemang	30 April 1982	10 August 1986
Deputy Minister of Commerce and Industry	Dato' Lew Sip Hon MP	MCA	Shah Alam	30 April 1982	2 June 1983
Deputy Minister of Commerce and Industry	Dato' Shahrir Abdul Samad MP	UMNO	Johor Bahru	30 April 1982	2 June 1983
Deputy Minister of Commerce and Industry	Oo Gin Sun MP	MCA	Alor Setar	2 June 1983	7 January 1986
Deputy Minister of Commerce and Industry	Muhyiddin Yassin MP	UMNO	Pagoh	2 June 1983	10 August 1986
Deputy Minister of Commerce and Industry	Kee Yong Wee	MCA	Senator	7 January 1986	22 July 1986
Deputy Minister of Finance	Sabbaruddin Chik MP	UMNO	Temerloh	30 April 1982	10 August 1986
Deputy Minister of Finance	Dato' Ling Liong Sik MP	MCA	Mata Kuching	30 April 1982	16 July 1984
Deputy Minister of Finance	Tan Tiong Hong MP	MCA	Raub	16 July 1984	7 January 1986
Deputy Minister of Finance	Oo Gin Sun MP	MCA	Alor Setar	7 January 1986	10 August 1986
Deputy Minister of Labour and Manpower (till 7 June 1983); Deputy Minister of Labour (since 7 June 1983)	Zakaria Abdul Rahman MP	UMNO	Besut	30 April 1982	10 August 1986
Deputy Minister of Labour and Manpower (till 7 June 1983); Deputy Minister of Labour (since 7 June 1983)	William Lye Chee Hien MP	BERJAYA	Pulau Gaya	30 April 1982	10 August 1986
Deputy Minister of National and Rural Development	Mohammad Yahya Lampong MP	Independent	Kota Belud	16 July 1984	25 March 1985
Deputy Minister of National and Rural Development	Abdillah Abdul Hamid MP	BERJAYA	Silam	25 March 1985	10 August 1986
Deputy Minister of Works and Public Amenities	Nik Hussein Wan Abdul Rahman MP	UMNO	Kuala Krai	30 April 1982	7 June 1983
Deputy Minister of Works	Nik Hussein Wan Abdul Rahman MP	UMNO	Kuala Krai	7 June 1983	16 July 1984
Deputy Minister of Works	Zainal Abidin Zin MP	UMNO	Bagan Serai	16 July 1984	10 August 1986
Deputy Minister of Energy, Telecommunications and Posts	Clarence E. Mansul MP	BERJAYA	Penampang	30 April 1982	2 June 1983
Deputy Minister of Energy, Telecommunications and Posts	Dato' Suhaimi Kamaruddin MP	UMNO	Sepang	2 June 1983	16 July 1984
Deputy Minister of Energy, Telecommunications and Posts	Abdul Rahim Abu Bakar MP	UMNO	Kuantan	16 July 1984	10 August 1986
Deputy Minister of Agriculture	Chin Hon Ngian MP	MCA	Renggam	30 April 1982	2 June 1983
Deputy Minister of Agriculture	Luhat Wan MP	SNAP	Baram	30 April 1982	10 August 1986
Deputy Minister of Agriculture	Goh Cheng Teik MP	GERAKAN	Nibong Tebal	2 June 1983	10 August 1986
Deputy Minister of Transport	Dato' Abu Hassan Omar MP	UMNO	Kuala Selangor	30 April 1982	16 July 1984
Deputy Minister of Transport	Dato' Rahmah Othman MP	UMNO	Selayang	16 July 1984	10 August 1986
Deputy Minister of Primary Industries	Bujang Ulis MP	PBB	Simunjan	30 April 1982	16 July 1984
Deputy Minister of Primary Industries	Megat Junid Megat Ayub MP	UMNO	Hilir Perak	16 July 1984	10 August 1986
Deputy Minister of Defence	Abang Abu Bakar Abang Mustapha MP	PBB	Paloh	30 April 1982	10 August 1986
Deputy Minister of Home Affairs	Mohd. Kassim Ahmed MP	UMNO	Machang	30 April 1982	16 July 1984
Deputy Minister of Home Affairs	Mohd Radzi Sheikh Ahmad MP	UMNO	Kangar	16 July 1984	10 August 1986
Deputy Minister of Foreign Affairs	Abdul Kadir Sheikh Fadzir MP	UMNO	Kulim-Bandar Baharu	2 June 1983	10 August 1986
Deputy Minister of Culture, Youth and Sports	Rosemary Chow Poh Kheng MP	MCA	Ulu Langat	30 April 1982	16 July 1984
Deputy Minister of Culture, Youth and Sports	Rosemary Chow Poh Kheng MP	MCA	Ulu Langat	25 March 1985	10 August 1986
Deputy Minister of Federal Territories	Muhyiddin Yassin MP	UMNO	Pagoh	30 April 1982	1 June 1983
Deputy Minister of Federal Territories	Ahmad Shah Hussein Tambakau MP	BERJAYA	Keningau	2 June 1983	10 August 1986
Deputy Minister of Housing and Local Government	Napsiah Omar MP	UMNO	Kuala Pilah	30 April 1982	10 August 1986
Deputy Minister of Housing and Local Government	Subramaniam Sinniah MP	MIC	Segamat	30 April 1982	10 August 1986
Deputy Minister of Public Enterprises	Daud Taha MP	UMNO	Batu Pahat	25 March 1985	10 August 1986
Deputy Minister of Education	Tan Tiong Hong MP	MCA	Raub	30 April 1982	16 July 1984
Deputy Minister of Education	Mohd Khalil Yaakob MP	UMNO	Maran	30 April 1982	16 July 1984
Deputy Minister of Education	Rosemary Chow Poh Kheng MP	MCA	Ulu Langat	16 July 1984	25 March 1985
Deputy Minister of Education	Bujang Ulis MP	PBB	Simunjan	16 July 1984	10 August 1986
Deputy Minister of Education	Dato' Ling Liong Sik MP	MCA	Mata Kuching	25 March 1985	7 January 1986
Deputy Minister of Education	Ng Cheng Kiat MP	MCA	Senator	7 January 1986	10 August 1986

== Composition before cabinet dissolution ==
=== Full members ===
Office	Incumbent	Party	Constituency
Prime Minister	Mahathir Mohamad MP	UMNO	Kubang Pasu
Minister of Defence	Mahathir Mohamad MP	UMNO	Kubang Pasu
Minister of Home Affairs	Mahathir Mohamad MP	UMNO	Kubang Pasu
Deputy Prime Minister	Abdul Ghafar Baba MP	UMNO	Jasin
Minister of Works	Samy Vellu MP	MIC	Sungei Siput
Minister of Foreign Affairs	Tengku Ahmad Rithauddeen Tengku Ismail MP	UMNO	Kota Bharu
Minister of Commerce and Industry	Tengku Razaleigh Hamzah MP	UMNO	Ulu Kelantan
Minister of Primary Industries	Paul Leong Khee Seong MP	GERAKAN	Taiping
Minister of Energy, Telecommunications and Posts	Leo Moggie Irok MP	SNAP	Kanowit
Minister of Public Enterprises	Rafidah Aziz MP	UMNO	Kuala Kangsar
Minister of Culture, Youth and Sports	Sulaiman Daud MP	PBB	Santubong
Minister of National and Rural Development	Sanusi Junid MP	UMNO	Jerlun-Langkawi
Minister of Education	Abdullah Ahmad Badawi MP	UMNO	Kepala Batas
Minister of Information	Rais Yatim MP	UMNO	Jelebu
Minister of Health	Mak Hon Kam MP	MCA	Tanjong Malim
Minister of Lands and Regional Development	Mohd. Adib Mohd. Adam MP	UMNO	Alor Gajah
Minister of Science, Technology and Environment	Stephen Yong Kuet Tze MP	SUPP	Padawan
Minister of Federal Territories	Shahrir Abdul Samad MP	UMNO	Johor Bahru
Minister of Agriculture	Anwar Ibrahim MP	UMNO	Permatang Pauh
Minister of Justice	James Peter Ongkili MP	BERJAYA	Tuaran
Minister in the Prime Minister's Department	James Peter Ongkili MP	BERJAYA	Tuaran
Minister of Social Welfare	Abu Hassan Omar MP	UMNO	Kuala Selangor
Minister in the Prime Minister's Department	Mohd Khalil Yaakob MP	UMNO	Maran
Minister of Finance	Daim Zainuddin MP	UMNO	Kuala Muda
Minister of Transport	Ling Liong Sik MP	MCA	Mata Kuching
Minister of Housing and Local Government	Chan Siang Sun MP	MCA	Bentong
Minister of Labour	Lee Kim Sai MP	MCA	Ulu Selangor

=== Deputy ministers ===
Office	Incumbent	Party	Constituency
Deputy Minister of Agriculture	Goh Cheng Teik MP	GERAKAN	Nibong Tebal
Deputy Minister of Health	K. Pathmanaban MP	MIC	Telok Kemang
Deputy Minister of Labour	Zakaria Abdul Rahman MP	UMNO	Besut
Deputy Minister of Labour	William Lye Chee Hien MP	BERJAYA	Gaya
Deputy Minister of Education	Bujang Ulis MP	PBB	Simunjan
Deputy Minister of Defence	Abang Abu Bakar Abang Mustapha MP	PBB	Paloh
Deputy Minister of Agriculture	Luhat Wan MP	SNAP	Baram
Deputy Minister of Information	Mohd. Kassim Ahmed MP	UMNO	Machang
Deputy Minister of Culture, Youth and Sports	Rosemary Chow Poh Kheng MP	MCA	Ulu Langat
Deputy Minister in the Prime Minister's Department	Shariffah Dorah Syed Mohammed MP	UMNO	Semerah
Deputy Minister of Commerce and Industry	Muhyiddin Yassin MP	UMNO	Pagoh
Deputy Minister of Housing and Local Government	Subramaniam Sinniah MP	MIC	Segamat
Deputy Minister in the Prime Minister's Department	Tan Tiong Hong MP	MCA	Raub
Deputy Minister of Transport	Rahmah Othman MP	UMNO	Selayang
Deputy Minister of Finance	Sabbaruddin Chik MP	UMNO	Temerloh
Deputy Minister of Housing and Local Government	Napsiah Omar MP	UMNO	Kuala Pilah
Deputy Minister of Foreign Affairs	Abdul Kadir Sheikh Fadzir MP	UMNO	Kulim-Bandar Baharu
Deputy Minister of Home Affairs	Mohd Radzi Sheikh Ahmad MP	UMNO	Kangar
Deputy Minister of Finance	Oo Gin Sun MP	MCA	Alor Setar
Deputy Minister of Federal Territories	Ahmad Shah Hussein Tambakau MP	BERJAYA	Keningau
Deputy Minister of Works	Zainal Abidin Zin MP	UMNO	Bagan Serai
Deputy Minister of Primary Industries	Megat Junid Megat Ayub MP	UMNO	Hilir Perak
Deputy Minister of Energy, Telecommunications and Posts	Abdul Rahim Abu Bakar MP	UMNO	Kuantan
Deputy Minister of Public Enterprises	Daud Taha MP	UMNO	Batu Pahat
Deputy Minister of National and Rural Development	Abdillah Abdul Hamid MP	BERJAYA	Silam
Deputy Minister of Information	Ng Cheng Kuai MP	MCA	Lumut
Deputy Minister in the Prime Minister's Department	Senator Mohamed Yusof Mohamed Noor	UMNO	
Deputy Minister of Commerce and Industry	Senator Kee Yong Wee	MCA	
Deputy Minister of Education	Senator Ng Cheng Kiat	MCA	

== See also ==
- Members of the Dewan Rakyat, 6th Malaysian Parliament
- List of parliamentary secretaries of Malaysia § Second Mahathir cabinet
