= Third Mahathir cabinet =

11th Cabinet of Malaysia

- 11th Cabinet of Malaysia

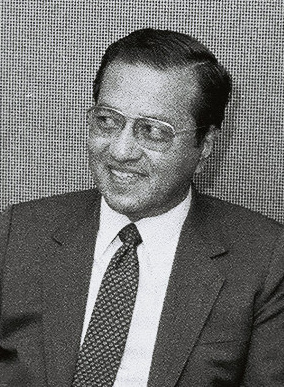

People and organisations
- Head of state: Tuanku Iskandar (1986–1989); Tuanku Azlan Shah (1989–1990)
- Head of government: Mahathir Mohamad
- Deputy head of government: Abdul Ghafar Baba
- Member parties: Barisan Nasional: United Malays National Organisation; Malaysian Chinese Association; United Sabah Party (until July 1990); United Traditional Bumiputera Party; Malaysian Indian Congress; Malaysian People's Movement Party; United Sabah National Organisation; Sarawak Native People's Party; Sarawak United Peoples' Party; Sarawak National Party; Muslim People's Party of Malaysia
- Status in legislature: Coalition government
- Opposition parties: Democratic Action Party; Pan-Malaysian Islamic Party; United Sabah Party (from July 1990)
- Opposition leader: Lim Kit Siang

History
- Election: 1986 Malaysian general election
- Outgoing election: 1990 Malaysian general election
- Legislature term: 7th Malaysian Parliament
- Budgets: 1987, 1988, 1989, 1990
- Predecessor: Second Mahathir cabinet
- Successor: Fourth Mahathir cabinet

Mahathir Mohamad formed the third Mahathir cabinet after being invited by Tuanku Iskandar to begin a new government following the 3 August 1986 general election in Malaysia. Prior to the election, Mahathir led (as Prime Minister) the second Mahathir cabinet, a coalition government that consisted of members of the component parties of Barisan Nasional. It was the 11th cabinet of Malaysia formed since independence.

This is a list of the members of the third cabinet of the fourth Prime Minister of Malaysia, Mahathir Mohamad.

== Composition ==
=== Full members ===
The federal cabinet consisted of the following ministers:

Portfolio	Office bearer	Party	Constituency	Term start	Term end
Prime Minister	Dato' Seri Dr. Mahathir Mohamad MP	UMNO	Kubang Pasu	11 August 1986	26 October 1990
Deputy Prime Minister	Abdul Ghafar Baba MP	UMNO	Jasin	11 August 1986	26 October 1990
Minister in the Prime Minister's Department	Dato' Abdul Ajib Ahmad MP	UMNO	Mersing	11 August 1986	7 May 1987
Minister in the Prime Minister's Department	Datuk Kasitah Gaddam MP	USNO	Kinabalu	11 August 1986	15 June 1989
Minister in the Prime Minister's Department	Mohamed Yusof Mohamed Noor MP	UMNO	Setiu	20 May 1987	26 October 1990
Minister in the Prime Minister's Department	Dato' Sulaiman Daud MP	PBB	Santubong	15 June 1989	26 October 1990
Minister of Finance	Dato' Paduka Daim Zainuddin MP	UMNO	Merbok	11 August 1986	26 October 1990
Minister of Defence	Dato' Abdullah Ahmad Badawi MP	UMNO	Kepala Batas	11 August 1986	7 May 1987
Minister of Defence	Dato Sri Tengku Ahmad Rithauddeen Ismail MP	UMNO	Kota Bharu	20 May 1987	26 October 1990
Minister of Home Affairs	Dato' Seri Dr. Mahathir Mohamad MP	UMNO	Kubang Pasu	11 August 1986	26 October 1990
Minister of Justice	Dato' Seri Dr. Mahathir Mohamad MP	UMNO	Kubang Pasu	11 August 1986	15 June 1989
Minister of Justice	Dato' Sulaiman Daud MP	PBB	Santubong	15 June 1989	26 October 1990
Minister of Trade and Industry	Tan Sri Tengku Razaleigh Hamzah MP	UMNO	Gua Musang	11 August 1986	28 April 1987
Minister of Trade and Industry	Dato' Seri Rafidah Aziz MP	UMNO	Kuala Kangsar	20 May 1987	26 October 1990
Minister of Education	Anwar Ibrahim MP	UMNO	Permatang Pauh	11 August 1986	26 October 1990
Minister of Lands and Regional Development	Dato' Sulaiman Daud MP	PBB	Santubong	11 August 1986	15 June 1989
Minister of Lands and Regional Development	Kasitah Gaddam MP	USNO	Kinabalu	15 June 1989	26 October 1990
Minister of Federal Territories	Dato' Seri Abu Hassan Omar MP	UMNO	Kuala Selangor	11 August 1986	20 May 1987
Minister of Transport	Dato' Seri Ling Liong Sik MP	MCA	Labis	11 August 1986	26 October 1990
Minister of Agriculture	Dato' Sanusi Junid MP	UMNO	Jerlun-Langkawi	11 August 1986	26 October 1990
Minister of Health	Dato' Chan Siang Sun MP	MCA	Bentong	11 August 1986	21 March 1989
Minister of Health	Ng Cheng Kiat MP	MCA	Klang	15 June 1989	26 October 1990
Minister of Culture, Arts and Tourism	Dato' Sabbaruddin Chik MP	UMNO	Temerloh	20 May 1987	26 October 1990
Minister of Housing and Local Government	Abdul Ghafar Baba MP (Acting Minister)	UMNO	Jasin	11 August 1986	27 October 1986
Minister of Housing and Local Government	Ng Cheng Kiat MP	MCA	Klang	27 October 1986	15 June 1989
Minister of Housing and Local Government	Dato' Lee Kim Sai MP	MCA	Hulu Langat	15 June 1989	26 October 1990
Minister of Foreign Affairs	Dato' Rais Yatim MP	UMNO	Jelebu	11 August 1986	20 May 1987
Minister of Foreign Affairs	Dato' Seri Abu Hassan Omar MP	UMNO	Kuala Selangor	20 May 1987	26 October 1990
Minister of Labour	Dato' Lee Kim Sai MP	MCA	Hulu Langat	11 August 1986	15 June 1989
Minister of Labour	Dato' Lim Ah Lek MP	MCA	Bentong	15 June 1989	26 October 1990
Minister of Public Enterprises	Dato' Seri Rafidah Aziz MP	UMNO	Kuala Kangsar	11 August 1986	20 May 1987
Minister of Public Enterprises	Dato' Napsiah Omar MP	UMNO	Kuala Pilah	20 May 1987	26 October 1990
Minister of National and Rural Development	Abdul Ghafar Baba MP	UMNO	Jasin	11 August 1986	26 October 1990
Minister of Works	Dato' Seri Samy Vellu MP	MIC	Sungai Siput	11 August 1986	15 June 1989
Minister of Works	Dato' Leo Moggie Irok MP	PBDS	Kanowit	15 June 1989	26 October 1990
Minister of Science, Technology and Environment	Datuk Amar Stephen Yong Kuet Tze MP	SUPP	Padawan	11 August 1986	26 October 1990
Minister of Energy, Telecommunications and Posts	Dato' Leo Moggie Irok MP	PBDS	Kanowit	11 August 1986	15 June 1989
Minister of Energy, Telecommunications and Posts	Dato' Seri Samy Vellu MP	MIC	Sungai Siput	15 June 1989	26 October 1990
Minister for Primary Industries	Dato' Seri Lim Keng Yaik MP	Gerakan	Beruas	11 August 1986	26 October 1990
Minister of Social Welfare	Dato' Shahrir Abdul Samad MP	UMNO	Johor Bahru	11 August 1986	7 May 1987
Minister of Social Welfare	Dato' Mustaffa Mohammad MP	UMNO	Sri Gading	20 May 1987	26 October 1990
Minister of Youth and Sports	Dato' Sri Mohd. Najib Abdul Razak MP	UMNO	Pekan	11 August 1986	26 October 1990
Minister of Information	Dato' Sri Tengku Ahmad Rithauddeen Ismail MP	UMNO	Kota Bharu	11 August 1986	20 May 1987
Minister of Information	Dato' Mohamed Rahmat MP	UMNO	Pulai	20 May 1987	26 October 1990

=== Deputy ministers ===
Portfolio	Office bearer	Party	Constituency	Term start	Term end
Deputy Minister in the Prime Minister's Department	Dato' Siti Zaharah Sulaiman MP	UMNO	Mentakab	11 August 1986	26 October 1990
Deputy Minister in the Prime Minister's Department	Mohamed Yusof Mohamed Noor MP	UMNO	Setiu	11 August 1986	20 May 1987
Deputy Minister in the Prime Minister's Department	Oo Gin Sun MP	MCA	Alor Setar	11 August 1986	15 June 1989
Deputy Minister in the Prime Minister's Department	Raja Ariffin Raja Sulaiman MP	UMNO	Baling	20 May 1987	26 October 1990
Deputy Minister in the Prime Minister's Department	Suleiman Mohamed MP	UMNO	Titiwangsa	20 May 1987	26 October 1990
Deputy Minister in the Prime Minister's Department	Ting Chew Peh MP	MCA	Gopeng	15 June 1989	26 October 1990
Deputy Minister of Finance	Dato' Sabbaruddin Chik MP	UMNO	Temerloh	11 August 1986	20 May 1987
Deputy Minister of Finance	Ng Cheng Kiat MP	MCA	Klang	11 August 1986	27 October 1986
Deputy Minister of Finance	Mohamed Farid Ariffin	UMNO	Senator	20 May 1987	15 June 1989
Deputy Minister of Finance	Wan Abu Bakar Wan Mohamad MP	UMNO	Jerantut	15 June 1989	26 October 1990
Deputy Minister of Finance	Dato' Loke Yuen Yow MP	MCA	Tanjong Malim	27 October 1986	26 October 1990
Deputy Minister of Defence	Dato Abang Abu Bakar Abang Mustapha MP	PBB	Paloh	11 August 1986	26 October 1990
Deputy Minister of Home Affairs	Dato' Megat Junid Megat Ayub MP	UMNO	Pasir Salak	11 August 1986	26 October 1990
Deputy Minister of Trade and Industry	Kok Wee Kiat MP	MCA	Selandar	11 August 1986	26 October 1990
Deputy Minister of Education	Woon See Chin MP	MCA	Senai	11 August 1986	26 October 1990
Deputy Minister of Education	Bujang Ulis MP	PBB	Simunjan	11 August 1986	20 May 1987
Deputy Minister of Education	Leo Michael Toyad MP	PBB	Mukah	20 May 1987	26 October 1990
Deputy Minister of Lands and Regional Development	Mohd. Kassim Ahmed MP	UMNO	Machang	11 August 1986	20 May 1987
Deputy Minister of Lands and Regional Development	Dato' Mohd Khalid Mohd Yunus MP	UMNO	Jempol	20 May 1987	26 October 1990
Deputy Minister of Transport	Rahmah Othman MP	UMNO	Shah Alam	11 August 1986	7 May 1987
Deputy Minister of Transport	Zaleha Ismail MP	UMNO	Selayang	20 May 1987	26 October 1990
Deputy Minister of Agriculture	Alexander Lee Yu Lung MP	Gerakan	Batu	11 August 1986	15 June 1989
Deputy Minister of Agriculture	Luhat Wan MP	SNAP	Baram	11 August 1986	20 May 1987
Deputy Minister of Agriculture	Mohd. Kassim Ahmed MP	UMNO	Machang	20 May 1987	26 October 1990
Deputy Minister of Agriculture	Subramaniam Sinniah MP	MIC	Segamat	15 June 1989	26 October 1990
Deputy Minister of Health	K. Pathmanaban MP	MIC	Telok Kemang	11 August 1986	15 June 1989
Deputy Minister of Health	Mohamed Farid Ariffin	UMNO	Senator	15 June 1989	26 October 1990
Deputy Minister of Culture, Arts and Tourism	Ng Cheng Kuai MP	MCA	Lumut	15 June 1989	26 October 1990
Deputy Minister of Housing and Local Government	Dato' Napsiah Omar MP	UMNO	Kuala Pilah	11 August 1986	20 May 1987
Deputy Minister of Housing and Local Government	Subramaniam Sinniah MP	MIC	Segamat	11 August 1986	15 June 1989
Deputy Minister of Housing and Local Government	Hussein Ahmad	UMNO	Senator	20 May 1987	26 October 1990
Deputy Minister of Housing and Local Government	Osu Sukam MP	USNO	Papar	15 June 1989	26 October 1990
Deputy Minister of Foreign Affairs	Dato' Abdul Kadir Sheikh Fadzir MP	UMNO	Kulim-Bandar Baharu	11 August 1986	20 May 1987
Deputy Minister of Foreign Affairs	Abdullah Fadzil Che Wan MP	UMNO	Bukit Gantang	20 May 1987	26 October 1990
Deputy Minister of Labour	Wan Abu Bakar Wan Mohamad MP	UMNO	Jerantut	11 August 1986	15 June 1989
Deputy Minister of Labour	Kalakau Untol MP	USNO	Tuaran	11 August 1986	26 October 1990
Deputy Minister of Labour	K. Pathmanaban MP	MIC	Telok Kemang	15 June 1989	26 October 1990
Deputy Minister of Public Enterprises	Daud Taha MP	UMNO	Batu Pahat	11 August 1986	26 October 1990
Deputy Minister of National and Rural Development	Dato' Tajol Rosli Mohd Ghazali MP	UMNO	Gerik	11 August 1986	26 October 1990
Deputy Minister of National and Rural Development	Ng Cheng Kuai MP	MCA	Lumut	11 August 1986	15 June 1989
Deputy Minister of Works	Dato' Mustaffa Mohammad MP	UMNO	Sri Gading	11 August 1986	20 May 1987
Deputy Minister of Works	Osu Sukam MP	USNO	Papar	27 October 1986	15 June 1989
Deputy Minister of Works	Luhat Wan MP	SNAP	Baram	20 May 1987	26 October 1990
Deputy Minister of Works	Alexander Lee Yu Lung MP	Gerakan	Batu	15 June 1989	26 October 1990
Deputy Minister of Science, Technology and Environment	Law Hieng Ding MP	SUPP	Sarikei	20 May 1987	26 October 1990
Deputy Minister of Energy, Telecommunications and Posts	Zainal Abidin Zin MP	UMNO	Bagan Serai	11 August 1986	7 May 1987
Deputy Minister of Energy, Telecommunications and Posts	Abdul Ghani Othman MP	UMNO	Ledang	20 May 1987	26 October 1990
Deputy Minister for Primary Industries	Mohd Radzi Sheikh Ahmad MP	UMNO	Kangar	11 August 1986	20 May 1987
Deputy Minister for Primary Industries	Alias Md. Ali MP	UMNO	Hulu Terengganu	20 May 1987	26 October 1990
Deputy Minister of Youth and Sports	Wang Choon Wing MP	MCA	Lipis	11 August 1986	14 June 1988
Deputy Minister of Youth and Sports	Teng Gaik Kwan MP	MCA	Raub	14 June 1988	26 October 1990
Deputy Minister of Information	Railey Jeffrey MP	USNO	Silam	27 October 1986	26 October 1990

== Composition before cabinet dissolution ==
=== Full members ===
Office	Incumbent	Party	Constituency
Prime Minister	Mahathir Mohamad MP	UMNO	Kubang Pasu
Minister of Home Affairs	Mahathir Mohamad MP	UMNO	Kubang Pasu
Deputy Prime Minister	Abdul Ghafar Baba MP	UMNO	Jasin
Minister of National and Rural Development	Abdul Ghafar Baba MP	UMNO	Jasin
Minister of Transport	Ling Liong Sik MP	MCA	Labis
Minister of Energy, Telecommunications and Posts	Samy Vellu MP	UMNO	Sungai Siput
Minister of Primary Industries	Lim Keng Yaik MP	GERAKAN	Beruas
Minister of Defence	Tengku Ahmad Rithauddeen Tengku Ismail MP	UMNO	Kota Bharu
Minister of Works	Leo Moggie Irok MP	PBDS	Kanowit
Minister of Commerce and Industry	Rafidah Aziz MP	UMNO	Kuala Kangsar
Minister in the Prime Minister's Department	Sulaiman Daud MP	PBB	Santubong
Minister of Justice	Sulaiman Daud MP	PBB	Santubong
Minister of Agriculture	Sanusi Junid MP	UMNO	Jerlun-Langkawi
Minister of Science, Technology and Environment	Stephen Yong Kuet Tze MP	SUPP	Padawan
Minister of Education	Anwar Ibrahim MP	UMNO	Permatang Pauh
Minister of Foreign Affairs	Abu Hassan Omar MP	UMNO	Kuala Selangor
Minister of Finance	Daim Zainuddin MP	UMNO	Merbok
Minister of Housing and Local Government	Lee Kim Sai MP	MCA	Hulu Langat
Minister of Youth and Sports	Najib Razak MP	UMNO	Pekan
Minister of Lands and Regional Development	Kasitah Gaddam MP	USNO	Kinabalu
Minister of Health	Ng Cheng Kiat MP	MCA	Klang
Minister of Information	Mohamed Rahmat MP	UMNO	Pulai
Minister of Culture and Tourism	Sabbaruddin Chik MP	UMNO	Temerloh
Minister of Public Enterprises	Napsiah Omar MP	UMNO	Kuala Pilah
Minister in the Prime Minister's Department	Mohamed Yusof Mohamed Noor MP	UMNO	Setiu
Minister of Social Welfare	Mustaffa Mohammad MP	UMNO	Sri Gading
Minister of Human Resources	Lim Ah Lek MP	MCA	Bentong

=== Deputy ministers ===
Office	Incumbent	Party	Constituency
Deputy Minister of Human Resources	K. Pathmanaban MP	MIC	Telok Kemang
Deputy Minister of Defence	Abang Abu Bakar Abang Mustapha MP	PBB	Paloh
Deputy Minister of Works	Luhat Wan MP	SNAP	Baram
Deputy Minister of Agriculture	Mohd. Kassim Ahmed MP	UMNO	Machang
Deputy Minister of Agriculture	Subramaniam Sinniah MP	MIC	Segamat
Deputy Minister of Home Affairs	Megat Junid Megat Ayub MP	UMNO	Pasir Salak
Deputy Minister of Public Enterprises	Daud Taha MP	UMNO	Batu Pahat
Deputy Minister of Culture and Tourism	Ng Cheng Kuai MP	MCA	Lumut
Deputy Minister of National and Rural Development	Tajol Rosli Mohd Ghazali MP	UMNO	Gerik
Deputy Minister of Works	Alexander Lee Yu Lung MP	GERAKAN	Batu
Deputy Minister of Finance	Wan Abu Bakar Wan Mohamad MP	UMNO	Jerantut
Deputy Minister in the Prime Minister's Department	Siti Zaharah Sulaiman MP	UMNO	Mentakab
Deputy Minister of Commerce and Industry	Kok Wee Kiat MP	MCA	Selandar
Deputy Minister of Education	Woon See Chin MP	MCA	Senai
Deputy Minister of Human Resources	Kalakau Untol MP	USNO	Tuaran
Deputy Minister of Finance	Loke Yuen Yow MP	MCA	Tanjong Malim
Deputy Minister of Housing and Local Government	Osu Sukam MP	USNO	Papar
Deputy Minister of Information	Railey Jeffrey MP	USNO	Silam
Deputy Minister of Science, Technology and Environment	Law Hieng Ding MP	SUPP	Sarikei
Deputy Minister of Transport	Zaleha Ismail MP	UMNO	Selayang
Deputy Minister of Primary Industries	Alias Md. Ali MP	UMNO	Hulu Terengganu
Deputy Minister in the Prime Minister's Department	Raja Ariffin Raja Sulaiman MP	UMNO	Baling
Minister of Lands and Regional Development	Mohd. Khalid Mohd. Yunus MP	UMNO	Jempol
Deputy Minister of Education	Leo Michael Toyad MP	PBB	Mukah
Deputy Minister of Foreign Affairs	Abdullah Fadzil Che Wan MP	UMNO	Bukit Gantang
Deputy Minister of Energy, Telecommunications and Posts	Abdul Ghani Othman MP	UMNO	Ledang
Deputy Minister in the Prime Minister's Department	Suleiman Mohamed MP	UMNO	Titiwangsa
Deputy Minister of Youth and Sports	Teng Gaik Kwan MP	MCA	Raub
Deputy Minister in the Prime Minister's Department	Ting Chew Peh MP	MCA	Gopeng
Deputy Minister of Housing and Local Government	Senator Hussein Ahmad	UMNO	
Deputy Minister of Health	Senator Mohamed Farid Ariffin	UMNO	

== See also ==
- Members of the Dewan Rakyat, 7th Malaysian Parliament
- List of parliamentary secretaries of Malaysia#Third Mahathir cabinet
