= 2015 Malaysian federal budget =

2015 Budget of the Malaysian Federal Government
Supply 2015
- Presented: 10 October 2014
- Country: Malaysia
- Parliament: 13th
- Party: Barisan Nasional
- Finance minister: Najib Razak
- Treasurer: Ministry of Finance
- Total revenue: MYR235.2 billion
- Total expenditures: MYR273.9 billion
- Program spending: MYR50.5 billion
- Debt payment: MYR24.4 billion
- Deficit: MYR35.7 billion (3.0% of GDP)
- Debt: MYR568.9 billion (52.8% of GDP)
- GDP: MYR876.4 billion (5.0–6.0%)
- Website: www.najibrazak.com/bajet2015/

The Malaysian federal budget for 2015 fiscal year was presented to the Dewan Rakyat by Prime Minister and Minister of Finance, Najib Razak on Friday, 10 October 2014.

== Summary ==
Following are the highlights of the 2015 Budget themed, "BUDGET 2015: PEOPLE ECONOMY", which was tabled by Prime Minister Najib Razak in Parliament.

- The 2015 Budget completes the 10th Malaysia Plan
- The 11th Malaysia Plan will be launched in May 2015
- A new approach, known as the Malaysian National Development Strategy, is being formulated
- Budget 2016 will be the trigger to the final five years of Malaysia's progress to a high-income advanced economy by 2020
- Since 2009, a total of 196 projects from 12 NKEAs and 6 SRIs have been implemented
- Total investment reached RM219 billion and more than 437,000 high-paying job opportunities created
- Malaysia registered GDP growth of 6.3 per cent, the highest among Asean countries in the first half of 2014
- The FBM KLCI has risen 114 per cent from 884.45 points in January 2009 to 1,892.65 points in July 2014
- Market capitalisation rose 162 per cent from RM667.87 billion to RM1,749.49 billion on 7 October 2014
- The GNI per capita increased 50 per cent from US$6,700 to US$10,060 in the last five years
- This year Malaysia will achieve strong economic growth of between 5.5 per cent and 6.0 per cent
- Fiscal deficit expected to reduce further to 3.5 per cent of GDP in 2014, 3.9 per cent in 2013, 6.7 per cent in 2009
- For 2015, economic growth expected to remain strong between 5.0 per cent and 6.0 per cent
- Fiscal deficit projected to further decline to 3 per cent of GDP
- The FBM KLCI reached 1,892.65 points in July 2014, a historic new high
- FDI totalling RM38.7 billion in 2013 was the highest realised investment to date
- The 2015 Budget allocates a total of RM273.9 billion, an increase of RM9.8 billion compared with 2014 initial allocation
- Operating expenditure RM223.4 billion, development expenditure RM50.5 billion
- In 2015, the revenue collection of the federal government is estimated at RM235.2 billion, an increase of RM10.2 billion from 2014
- Revenue from GST in 2015 estimated at RM23.2 billion
- Government to exempt several goods from GST amounting to RM3.8 billion
- Abolishment of SST will see RM13.8 billion in revenue forgone
- The government will have a balance revenue of RM5.6 billion after deducting RM3.8 billion for GST exemption and RM13.8 billion from abolishment of SST
- Of the total, RM4.9 billion will be channelled back to the rakyat through assistance programmes such as BR1M
- Finally, net revenue collection from GST will only amount to RM690 million
- 2015 Budget is formulated with focus on the people's economy and outlines seven main strategies
- Government to implement Services Sector Blueprint
- Government to introduce Services Sector Guarantee Scheme for SMEs amounting to RM5 billion
- Research Incentive Scheme for Enterprises with an allocation of RM10 million to be established
- The Service Export Fund totalling RM300 million to be reintroduced
- Strengthening the Franchise Development Scheme with RM20 million allocation
- Investment Account Platform will be introduced with initial start-up fund of RM150 million
- Malaysian Government Securities and Government Investment Issues to be listed and traded in Exchange Traded Bond and Sukuk
- Expenses incurred in the issuance of sukuk based on Ijarah and Wakalah principles will be extended for another three years until 2018
- Malaysia Protection & Indemnity Overseas Club will be established under Exim Bank, offering third-party liability protection at reasonable premiums
- Incentive of 100 per cent income tax exemption for five years will be available to encourage the private sector to manage, maintain and upgrade industrial estates in less developed areas
- Incentive of 70 per cent income tax exemption for 5 years will be made available to the private sector to manage industrial estates in other areas
- For high labour-intensive industries, an automation capital allowance of 200 per cent will be provided on the first RM4 million expenditure incurred within 2015–2017
- For other industries, automation capital allowance of 200 per cent will be provided on the first RM2 million expenditure incurred from 2015 to 2020
- A 59 km Sungai Besi-Ulu Klang Expressway worth RM5.3 billion will be constructed
- 276 km West Coast Expressway from Taiping to Banting worth RM5 billion will be built
- 36 km Eastern Klang Valley Expressway worth RM1.6 billion will be built
- Upgrading of the East Coast railway line along Gemas-Mentakab, Jerantut-Sungai Yu, and Gua Musang-Tumpat with an allocation of RM150 million
- Construction of the 56 km Second MRT Line from Selayang to Putrajaya at an estimated cost of RM23 billion
- LRT 3 Project to link Bandar Utama to Shah Alam and Klang at an estimated cost of RM9 billion
- The RM69 billion Pengerang Integrated Petroleum Complex project to create more than 10,000 job opportunities
- Sustainable Mobility Fund of RM70 million to be established under SME Bank to develop electric vehicle manufacturing industry
- 50 electric buses to be introduced
- RM200 million allocation for MyCreative Ventures in 2012
- RM100 million allocation for Digital Content Industry Fund
- High-speed Broadband will be implemented in high-impact areas, covering state capitals and selected major towns nationwide
- RM2.7 billion will be spent over the next five years to build 1,000 new telecommunication towers and laying of undersea cables
- Malaysia – Year of Festivals 2015 to attract 29.4 million foreign tourist arrivals with expected income of RM89 billion
- SME Investment Partner to be implemented with initial fund totalling RM375 million for five years
- RM80 million will be allocated for a soft loan scheme for automation and modernisation of SMEs
- Tekun to provide additional funds of RM500 million
- RM350 million Tekun fund to be allocated to Bumiputera entrepreneurs
- RM50 million Tekun fund to be allocated to Indian Entrepreneurs Financing Scheme
- RM50 million Tekun fund to be allocated to the Armed Forces Veteran Entrepreneur Development Programme
- Soft loans totalling RM50 million for SME entrepreneurs from the Chinese community, RM30 million for hawkers and petty traders
- 360 high-impact innovative products to be commercialised within the next five years
- RM290 million research fund to implement various high-impact research and development and commercialisation programmes
- Electricity consumption that is not subject to GST to increase from 200 units to 300 units. This will benefit 70 per cent of households
- The retail sale of RON95 petrol, diesel and LPG be given relief from the payment of GST
- The prices of 532 items, or 56 per cent in the basket of goods of CPI, are expected to reduce up to 4.1 per cent following the implementation of GST
- About 354 goods and services may see some price increases but less than 5.8 per cent following the implementation of GST
- Government will disseminate shoppers' guide to enable consumers compare prices before and after the implementation of GST
- 300,000 individual taxpayers will no longer pay income tax in 2015 following the implementation of GST
- For 2015, tax payers with family and income of RM4,000 per month will not have to pay tax
- Individual income tax would be restructured in 2015 whereby the chargeable income subject to maximum rate would be increased from exceeding RM100,000 to exceeding RM400,000
- Cooperative income tax rate would be reduced by one to two percentage points next year
- In 2016, corporate income tax rate would be reduced by one percentage point to 24 per cent and income tax rate for SMEs would be reduced by one percentage point to 19 per cent.
- Businesses to receive training grant of RM100 million for their employees to attend GST courses
- Small and medium enterprises to get RM150 million financial assistance to purchase software.
- Accelerated capital allowance on purchase of information and communication technology equipment and software.
- Expenses incurred for training in accounting and ICT relating to GST would be given additional tax deduction.
- Government to increase allocation for various subsidies to RM40.5 million in 2014
- The allocation for subsidies has increased 14 times from RM1.65 billion in 2002 to RM23.5 billion in 2013, solely to maintain low retail petrol price due to increase number of vehicles
- The government will soon announce a new mechanism for providing petroleum subsidy
- To attract more expatriate entrepreneurs to establish start-ups in Malaysia, the paid-up capital is now fixed at RM75,000
- Eligible expatriate start-up entrepreneurs to get one-year work pass
- EKUINAS to receive RM600 million to increase Bumiputera ownership in private companies and government-linked companies
- To date, EKUINAS has cumulative investments of RM2.3 billion in various sectors
- Strengthening the role of the National Entrepreneurship Institute as a centre of excellence for Bumiputera entrepreneurship
- Further accelerate the Bumiputera Entrepreneurs Startup Scheme with additional allocation RM300 million
- Bumiputera Entrepreneurs Startup Scheme will also be extended to Sabah and Sarawak
- Pre-export programme to be introduce for 60 high-performing Bumiputera companies to enhance branding, international certification and market surveys for Bumiputera products
- Lembaga Tabung Haji will allocate RM200 million to set up syariah-compliant Restricted Investment Account under Bank Islam, to provide financing and credit of between RM50,000 and RM1 million from January 2015
- Amanah Ikhtiar Malaysia to use internal sources of RM1.8 billion for financing to benefit 346,000 Sahabat AIM
- Malaysian Rubber Board (MRB) will allocate RM100 million to implement a regulatory price mechanism at the farm level
- MRB will provide soft loans of RM6.4 million as working capital to 64 smallholder cooperatives to purchase rubber directly from 442,000 rubber smallholders nationwide
- An allocation of RM41 million for smallholders to plant and replant oil palm
- Export duty exemption for crude palm oil extended until December 2014
- RM1.3 billion allocated to build 80,000 units under the 1Malaysia People's Housing Programme
- Ceiling of household income raised to RM10,000 from RM8,000 to enable more people to own houses
- Rent-To-Own Scheme to be introduced for individuals who are unable to obtain bank financing
- National Housing Department to get an allocation of RM644 million to build 26,000 units under the People's Housing Programme
- Syarikat Perumahan Negara Bhd to build 12,000 units of "Rumah Mesra Rakyat", 5,000 units of "Rumah Idaman Rakyat" and 20,000 units of "Rumah Aspirasi Rakyat" on privately owned land
- The government to extend the 50 per cent stamp duty exemption on instruments of transfer and loan agreement until December 2016
- The government to raise the ceiling price of "Skim Rumah Pertamaku" to RM500,000
- Age of borrowers to qualify for the scheme will be increased to 40 years from 35 years
- The Public Housing Maintenance Programme to get RM40 million allocation
- RM100 million will be allocated under the 1Malaysia Maintenance Fund for maintenance of private low-cost housing.
- Tax on gains from the disposal of properties be self-assessed by the taxpayer from 2016
- The minimum eligibility of civil servants for housing loans to be increased to RM120,000 from RM80,000 and the maximum eligibility limit to RM600,000 from RM450,000 next year
- The RM100 processing fee for housing loan application for civil servants to be abolished

== Total revenues and spending ==
=== Revenues ===
Revenue estimates for 2016 Budget, excluding 2016 tax measures
1. Companies income tax (30.9%)
2. Interests and proceeds from investments (13.3%)
3. Individual income tax (11.3%)
4. Petroleum income tax (10.9%)
5. Goods and services tax (9.20%)
6. Excise duties (5.80%)
7. Licenses, registration fees and permits (5.60%)
8. Stamp duty (3.10%)
9. Sales tax (1.20%)

Official sources

(In million MYR)

Source	Projected Revenues	% of Total Projected Revenues	Actual Revenues
Direct tax Income tax Companies Individual Petroleum Withholding Co-operatives Others Other direct taxes Stamp duty Real property gains tax Others	135,646 127,405 72,589 26,553 25,600 2,276 364 23 8,241 7,252 897 92	57.7% 54.2% 30.9% 11.3% 10.9% 1.0% 0.2% 0.0% 3.5% 3.1% 0.4% 0.0%	
Indirect tax Goods and services tax Excise duties Sales tax Other indirect taxes Import tax Export tax Services tax Levies	47,732 21,720 13,717 2,734 2,677 2,629 2,231 1,874 150	20.3% 9.2% 5.8% 1.2% 1.1% 1.1% 0.9% 0.8% 0.1%	
Non-tax revenue Interests and proceeds from investments Licenses, registration fees and permits Other non-tax revenue Service fees Fines and penalties Proceeds from sales of goods Rentals	49,813 31,193 13,143 2,213 1,304 1,136 574 250	21.2% 13.3% 5.6% 0.9% 0.6% 0.5% 0.2% 0.1%	
Non-revenue receipts	1,251	0.5%	
Federal territories revenue	777	0.3%	
Grand Total Revenue	235,219		

=== Expenditures by object ===
Official sources

These tables are in million MYR.

Description	Projected Expenditures	Actual Expenditures
Operating expenditures
Emoluments	65,651.7	
Supplies and services	38,098.8	
Assets	1,456.8	
Fixed Charges and Grants	116,417.6	
Other Expenditures	1,815.1	
Total Operating Expenditure	223,440.0	
Development expenditures
Direct Grant	45,614.3	
Loans	2,885.7	
Contingencies Reserve	2,000.0	
Total Development Expenditure	50,500.0	
Grand Total Expenditure	273,940.0	

=== Expenditures by budget function ===
These tables are in million MYR. The budget for the 2015 fiscal year (also demonstrating the basic budget structure) can be found below.

Function	Description	Projected			Actual
Function	Description	Expenditures	Operating Expenditures	Development Expenditures	Expenditures
1	Parliament	89.1	89.1	—N/a	
2	Office of the Keeper of the Rulers' Seal	2.3	2.3	—N/a	
3	National Audit Department	164.7	164.7	—N/a	
4	Election Commission	73.9	73.9	—N/a	
5	Public Services Commission	50.6	50.6	—N/a	
6	Prime Minister's Department	19,060.0	6,025.2	13,034.8	
7	Public Service Department	2,710.7	2,670.1	40.5	
8	Attorney General Chambers	202.2	202.2	—N/a	
9	Malaysian Anti-Corruption Commission	294.3	294.3	—N/a	
10	Treasury	4,376.8	3,427.3	949.5	
11	Treasury General Services	32,815.8	32,815.8	—N/a	
12	Contribution to Statutory Funds	2,053.8	2,053.8	—N/a	
13	Ministry of Foreign Affairs	916.9	761.8	155.1	
20	Ministry of Plantation Industries and Commodities	1,658.8	1,237.8	421.0	
21	Ministry of Agriculture and Agro-based Industry	6,065.0	4,284.3	1,780.8	
22	Ministry of Rural and Regional Development	10,507.8	5,982.3	4,525.5	
23	Ministry of Natural Resources and Environment	2,686.1	1,101.9	1,584.2	
24	Ministry of International Trade and Industry	1,302.6	586.7	716.0	
25	Ministry of Domestic Trade, Co-operatives and Consumerism	979.0	947.0	32.0	
27	Ministry of Works	5,950.8	2,112.6	3,838.2	
28	Ministry of Transport	4,603.0	1,256.2	3,346.8	
29	Ministry of Energy, Green Technology and Water	2,866.5	281.0	2,585.6	
30	Ministry of Science, Technology and Innovation	1,337.6	727.1	610.6	
31	Ministry of Tourism and Culture	1,505.2	1,187.6	317.6	
32	Ministry of the Federal Territories	1,137.4	427.4	710.0	
40	Education Service Commission	16.6	16.6	—N/a	
42	Ministry of Health	23,311.9	21,714.2	1,597.7	
43	Ministry of Urban Wellbeing, Housing and Local Government	4,571.6	2,556.5	2,015.1	
45	Ministry of Youth and Sports	949.9	534.8	415.1	
46	Ministry of Human Resources	1,395.8	801.8	594.0	
47	Ministry of Communications and Multimedia	1,737.8	1,385.1	352.7	
48	Ministry of Women, Family and Community Development	2,247.2	2,044.6	202.6	
60	Ministry of Defence	17,763.0	14,144.8	3,618.2	
62	Ministry of Home Affairs	13,393.7	12,611.2	782.5	
63	Ministry of Education	40,838.3	39,211.4	1,636.9	
64	Ministry of Higher Education	15,784.8	13,147.6	2,637.2	
70	Contingency fund	2,000.0	—N/a	2,000.0	
Total Functional Expenditure		230,431.7	179,931.7	50,500.0	
Dependent	Description	Projected			Actual
Dependent	Description	Expenditures	Operating Expenditures	Development Expenditures	Expenditures
(1)	Royal spending for the Yang di-Pertuan Agong	13.5	13.5	—N/a	
(2)	Royal allowances	1.8	1.8	—N/a	
(3)	Chief Justice, Chief Judges, Judges	90	90	—N/a	
(4)	Auditor General	1.3	1.3	—N/a	
(5)	Speaker of the Dewan Rakyat	1.3	1.3	—N/a	
(6)	President of the Dewan Negara	1.3	1.3	—N/a	
(7)	Election Commission	1.4	1.4	—N/a	
(8)	Law Services Commission	0.05	0.05	—N/a	
(9)	Public Services Commission	10.7	10.7	—N/a	
(10)	Education Services Commission	3.9	3.9	—N/a	
(11)	Police Force Commission	1.5	1.5	—N/a	
(12)	Treasury	6,072.1	6,302.3	—N/a	
(13)	Payment for public debt	24,379.3	24,379.3	—N/a	
(14)	Pensions, retirement allowances and rewards	15,700.0	15,700.0	—N/a	
Total Dependent Expenditure		46,508.3	46,508.3	—N/a	
Grand Total Expenditure		273,940.0			

== Supplementary supply bill ==
On 23 March 2015, the Government tabled a supplementary supply bill to augment its Budget 2015 by an additional RM2.2 billion, some two months after the prime minister revised this. The Bill was tabled for the first reading after question time today by Deputy Finance Minister Chua Tee Yong. The bulk of the requested amount — RM1.2 billion — will be channelled to the Treasury's consolidated fund, while the Education Ministry will be allocated with RM428 million. The Public Services Department will receive RM287 million and the Health Ministry, RM200 million. The Federal Territories Ministry and the Home Ministry will respectively get RM34 million and RM26 million. The Dewan Rakyat approved the Supplementary Supply Bill (2014) 2015 after it was debated at the committee level on 1 April 2015. The bill allocated a supplementary financial allocation of RM2,223,520,310 to several ministries as additional management expenditure for services.

Last year, Prime Minister Datuk Seri Najib Razak tabled a budget of RM273.9 billion, an increase of RM9.8 billion from 2014. He revised this in January following a sharp drop in global crude oil price and the devastating flood that ravaged the east coast states in the country. Despite announcing cuts to operating expenditure that could trim RM5.5 billion from government spending, Najib maintained that allocations for development totalling RM48.5 billion will be maintained.
