= 2014 Malaysian federal budget =

2014 Budget of the Malaysian Federal Government
Supply 2014
- Presented: 25 October 2013
- Country: Malaysia
- Parliament: 13th
- Party: Barisan Nasional
- Finance minister: Najib Razak
- Treasurer: Ministry of Finance
- Total revenue: MYR224.0 billion
- Total expenditures: MYR264.1 billion
- Program spending: MYR46.5 billion
- Debt payment: MYR23.2 billion
- Deficit: MYR37.1 billion (3.5% of GDP)
- Debt: MYR519.3 billion (53% of GDP)
- GDP: MYR826.0 billion (5.0–5.5%)
- Website: www.najibrazak.com/bajet2014/

The Malaysian federal budget for 2014 fiscal year was presented to the Dewan Rakyat by Prime Minister and Minister of Finance, Najib Razak on Friday, 25 October 2013.

== Summary ==
=== Cash handouts ===
- Pensioners will receive a special financial assistance of RM250 to assist them in meeting the rising cost of living.
- Government to give a half-month bonus for 2013 with a minimum payment of RM500 to be paid in early January 2014.
- Cash handouts to households with a monthly income of below RM3,000 will be increased to RM650 from RM500.
- For individuals aged 21 and above and with a monthly income not exceeding RM2,000, cash handouts will be increased to RM300 from RM250.
- For the first time, cash assistance of RM450 will be extended to households with a monthly income of between RM3,000-RM4,000.
- To implement all cash schemes, government will allocate RM4.6 billion which is expected to benefit 7.9 million recipients.

=== Real property gains tax ===
- For gains on properties disposed within the holding period of up to 3 years, RPGT rate is increased to 30%.
- For disposals within the holding period up to 4 and 5 years, the rates are increased to 20% and 15%, respectively.
- Raise the minimum price of property that can be purchased by foreigners to 1 million ringgit from RM500,000.
- Prohibit developers from implementing projects that have features of Developer Interest Bearing Scheme (DIBS), to prevent developers from incorporating interest rates on loans in house prices during the construction period.
- Financial institutions are prohibited from providing final funding for projects involved in the DIBS scheme. Malaysia's top three banks are Maybank, CIMB and Public Bank.

=== Affordable homes ===
- To further increase access to home ownership at affordable prices, an estimated 223,000 units of new houses will be built by the government and the private sector in 2014.
- Government to allocate RM578 million to the National Housing Department (JPN) for low cost flats consisting of 16,473 housing units.
- Malaysian's government to provide 80,000 housing units with an allocation of RM1 billion under affordable housing scheme. The sales price of the houses will be 20% lower than market prices.
- Introduce the Private Affordable Ownership Housing Scheme (MyHome) to encourage the private sector to build more low and medium-cost houses. The scheme provides a subsidy of RM30,000 to the private developers for each unit built.
- Preference will be given to developers who build low and medium-cost houses in areas with high demand and limited to 10,000 units in 2014.
- The scheme is for housing projects approved effective from 1 January 2014 with an allocation of RM300 million.

=== Tax relief ===
- Government proposes a special tax relief of RM2,000 be given to taxpayers with a monthly income up to RM8,000 received in 2013.

=== Goods and sales tax ===
- To implement goods and services tax (GST) on 1 April 2015
- GST rate fixed at 6%, the lowest among Asean countries.
- GST replaces current sales tax and service tax.
- Basic food items, transportation services, highway tolls, water and first 200 units of electricity for domestic users per month to be exempt from GST.
- Sale, purchase and rental of residential properties as well as selected financial services are exempted from GST.
- Najib: "The reality is that inflation now is low at around 2%. The government is confident this will be the best time to impose GST as inflation is minimal and under control."
- Training grant of RM100 million will be provided to businesses that send their employees for GST training in 2013 and 2014.
- Financial assistance amounting to RM150 million will be provided to small and medium enterprises for the purchase of accounting software in 2014 and 2015.

=== Corporate tax ===
- Corporate income tax rate be reduced by 1 percentage from 25% to 24%.
- Income tax rate for small and medium companies will be reduced by 1 percentage point from 20% to 19% from the year of assessment 2016.

=== Income tax ===
- Government to give one-off cash assistance of RM300 to low income group
- Personal income tax rates be reduced by 1 to 3 percentage points for all tax payers.
- Individual income tax structure will be reviewed
- Chargeable income subject to the maximum rate will be increased from exceeding RM100,000 to exceeding RM400,000.
- Current maximum tax rate at 26% to be reduced to 24%.
- Measures to be effective in 2015.

=== Subsidies ===
- Subsidy programme to be "gradually restructured".
- A portion of savings from restructuring to be distributed in the form of direct cash assistance with the other half to finance development projects.
- To abolish the sugar subsidy of 34 sen effective 26 October 2013.

=== Improving budget management ===
- Committed to reducing the fiscal deficit gradually, with the aim of achieving a balanced budget by 2020.
- To ensure federal debt level will remain low and not exceed 55% of GDP.
- Government to conduct audits on projects valued at more than RM100 million during its implementation.

=== Islamic finance ===
- Securities Commission to introduce the a framework for Social Responsible Investment (SRI) Sukuk, or Islamic bonds, to finance "sustainable and responsible" investment initiatives.

=== Agriculture ===
- Government to allocate RM6 billion allocated for agriculture programmes.
- Says to RM243 million allocated for rubber, palm oil and cocoa replanting as well as forest plantation programmes.

=== Logistics ===
- Government to allocate RM3 billion in soft loans under the Maritime Development Fund through Bank Pembangunan Malaysia.
- The fund is to provide financing to encourage the development of the shipping industry, shipyard construction, oil and gas as well as maritime-related support activities.

=== Aviation ===
- To replace existing air traffic control and management system in Subang, a new air traffic management centre costing RM700 million will be built at Kuala Lumpur International Airport (KLIA).
- Kota Kinabalu, Sandakan, Miri, Sibu and Mukah airports in Sabah and Sarawak to be upgraded with RM312 million allocation.

=== Public investments ===
- Public investments to reach RM106 billion. Projects to be implemented include:
  - A 316-kilometre West Coast Expressway. Locally listed Kumpulan Europlus Bhd owns 80% of the project, while IJM Corp owns the balance 20%.
  - Double-tracking rail project along west coast Malaysia. The project is carried out by as a joint venture between MMC Corp and Gamuda.
  - Various projects from state oil firm Petronas under its RM300 billion capex programme, including a petrochemicals plant in Johor.

=== Internet access ===
- To carry out second phase of high-speed broadband project with the private sector involving RM1.8 billion investment. State-linked telco Telekom Malaysia is involved in the project.
- To increase Internet coverage in rural areas, 1,000 telecommunication transmission towers will be built in the next three years, with an investment of RM1.5 billion.
- To increase Internet access in Sabah and Sarawak, new underwater cables will be laid within three years at a cost of RM850 million.

== Total revenues and spending ==
=== Revenues ===
Revenue estimates for 2016 Budget, excluding 2016 tax measures
1. Companies income tax (29.3%)
2. Interests and proceeds from investments (14.3%)
3. Individual income tax (12.8%)
4. Petroleum income tax (12.6%)
5. Excise duties (6.00%)
6. Licenses, registration fees and permits (5.90%)
7. Sales tax (4.90%)
8. Services tax (3.00%)
9. Stamp duty (3.00%)

Official source

(In million MYR)

| Source | Projected Revenues | % of Total Projected Revenues | Actual Revenues |
|---|---|---|---|
| Direct tax Income tax Companies Individual Petroleum Withholding Co-operatives Others Other direct taxes Stamp duty Real property gains tax Others | 133,148 125,664 65,729 28,746 28,275 2,524 370 20 7,484 6,693 703 88 | 59.4% 56.1% 29.3% 12.8% 12.6% 1.1% 0.2% 0.0% 3.3% 3.0% 0.3% 0.0% | |
| Indirect tax Excise duties Sales tax Services tax Other indirect taxes Import tax Export tax Levies | 38,822 13,442 10,986 6,810 2,827 2,502 2,105 150 | 17.3% 6.0% 4.9% 3.0% 1.3% 1.1% 0.9% 0.1% | |
| Non-tax revenue Interests and proceeds from investments Licenses, registration fees and permits Other non-tax revenue Service fees Fines and penalties Proceeds from sales of goods Rentals | 50,627 32,065 13,149 1,970 1,233 1,064 913 233 | 22.6% 14.3% 5.9% 0.9% 0.6% 0.5% 0.4% 0.1% | |
| Non-revenue receipts | 852 | 0.4% | |
| Federal territories revenue | 645 | 0.3% | |
| Grand Total Revenue | 224,094 | | |

=== Expenditures by object ===
Official sources

These tables are in million MYR.

| Description | Projected Expenditures | Actual Expenditures |
Operating expenditures
| Emoluments | 63,610.0 | |
| Supplies and services | 36,622.8 | |
| Assets | 1,408.6 | |
| Fixed Charges and Grants | 114,505.4 | |
| Other Expenditures | 1,504.1 | |
| Total Operating Expenditure | 217,651.0 | |
Development expenditures
| Direct Grant | 41,512.8 | |
| Loans | 2,987.2 | |
| Contingencies Reserve | 2,000.0 | |
| Total Development Expenditure | 46,500.0 | |
| Grand Total Expenditure | 264,151.0 | |

=== Expenditures by budget function ===
These tables are in million MYR. The budget for the 2014 fiscal year (also demonstrating the basic budget structure) can be found below.

| Function | Description | Projected | | | Actual |
| Function | Description | Expenditures | Operating Expenditures | Development Expenditures | Expenditures |
|---|---|---|---|---|---|
| 1 | Parliament | 86.7 | 86.7 | —N/a | |
| 2 | Office of the Keeper of the Rulers' Seal | 2.2 | 2.2 | —N/a | |
| 3 | Audit Department | 169.1 | 169.1 | —N/a | |
| 4 | Election Commission | 83.0 | 83.0 | —N/a | |
| 5 | Public Services Commission | 54.1 | 54.1 | —N/a | |
| 6 | Prime Minister's Department | 16,450.6 | 5,869.6 | 10,580.9 | |
| 7 | Public Service Department | 2,225.5 | 2,181.6 | 43.9 | |
| 8 | Attorney General Chambers | 197.4 | 197.4 | —N/a | |
| 9 | Malaysian Anti-Corruption Commission | 297.5 | 297.5 | —N/a | |
| 10 | Treasury | 4,627.5 | 3,266.5 | 1,361.0 | |
| 11 | Treasury General Services | 34,574.4 | 34,574.4 | —N/a | |
| 12 | Contribution to Statutory Funds | 2,916.9 | 2,916.9 | —N/a | |
| 13 | Ministry of Foreign Affairs | 846.8 | 641.8 | 205.0 | |
| 20 | Ministry of Plantation Industries and Commodities | 2,031.7 | 1,318.5 | 713.2 | |
| 21 | Ministry of Agriculture and Agro-based Industry | 6,035.0 | 4,367.4 | 1,667.6 | |
| 22 | Ministry of Rural and Regional Development | 9,832.1 | 5,724.4 | 4,107.8 | |
| 23 | Ministry of Natural Resources and Environment | 2,486.0 | 1,112.1 | 1,373.9 | |
| 24 | Ministry of International Trade and Industry | 1,290.4 | 601.1 | 689.3 | |
| 25 | Ministry of Domestic Trade, Co-operatives and Consumerism | 1,172.3 | 1,131.4 | 40.9 | |
| 27 | Ministry of Works | 6,191.5 | 2,605.5 | 3,586.0 | |
| 28 | Ministry of Transport | 5,221.1 | 1,311.1 | 3,910.0 | |
| 29 | Ministry of Energy, Green Technology and Water | 2,101.7 | 135.7 | 1,965.9 | |
| 30 | Ministry of Science, Technology and Innovation | 1,353.3 | 734.8 | 618.5 | |
| 31 | Ministry of Tourism and Culture | 1,503.5 | 1,219.6 | 283.9 | |
| 32 | Ministry of the Federal Territories | 1,775.3 | 504.8 | 1,270.5 | |
| 40 | Education Service Commission | 16.8 | 16.8 | —N/a | |
| 41 | Ministry of Education | 54,600.6 | 50,565.5 | 4,035.1 | |
| 42 | Ministry of Health | 22,160.4 | 20,498.1 | 1,662.3 | |
| 43 | Ministry of Urban Wellbeing, Housing and Local Government | 3,914.6 | 2,371.3 | 1,543.2 | |
| 45 | Ministry of Youth and Sports | 753.9 | 579.8 | 174.1 | |
| 46 | Ministry of Human Resources | 1,422.2 | 847.7 | 574.5 | |
| 47 | Ministry of Communications and Multimedia | 2,046.3 | 1,452.9 | 593.4 | |
| 48 | Ministry of Women, Family and Community Development | 2,159.1 | 2,052.1 | 107.0 | |
| 60 | Ministry of Defence | 16,100.2 | 13,355.3 | 2,744.9 | |
| 62 | Ministry of Home Affairs | 12,607.8 | 13,355.3 | 647.0 | |
| 70 | Contingency fund | 2,000.0 | —N/a | 2,000.0 | |
| Total Functional Expenditure | | 221,307.7 | 174,807.7 | 46,500.0 | |
| Dependent | Description | Projected | | | Actual |
| Dependent | Description | Expenditures | Operating Expenditures | Development Expenditures | Expenditures |
| (1) | Royal spending for the Yang di-Pertuan Agong | 13.5 | 13.5 | —N/a | |
| (2) | Royal allowances | 1.8 | 1.8 | —N/a | |
| (3) | Chief Justice, Chief Judges, Judges | 100.1 | 100.1 | —N/a | |
| (4) | Auditor General | 0.7 | 0.7 | —N/a | |
| (5) | Speaker of the Dewan Rakyat | 1.3 | 1.3 | —N/a | |
| (6) | President of the Dewan Negara | 1.3 | 1.3 | —N/a | |
| (7) | Election Commission | 1.6 | 1.6 | —N/a | |
| (8) | Law Services Commission | 0.05 | 0.05 | —N/a | |
| (9) | Public Services Commission | 10.4 | 10.4 | —N/a | |
| (10) | Education Services Commission | 3.8 | 3.8 | —N/a | |
| (11) | Police Force Commission | 1.4 | 1.4 | —N/a | |
| (12) | Treasury | 5,407.8 | 5,407.8 | —N/a | |
| (13) | Payment for public debt | 23,185.9 | 23,185.9 | —N/a | |
| (14) | Pensions, retirement allowances and rewards | 14,113.6 | 14,113.6 | —N/a | |
| Total Dependent Expenditure | | 42,843.3 | 42,843.3 | —N/a | |
| Grand Total Expenditure | | 264,151.0 | | | |

== Supplementary supply bill ==
On 24 March 2014, the Government tabled the Supplementary Supply (2013) Bill 2014 to seek for an additional expenditure for services for the year 2013 amounting to MYR2.392 billion (MYR2,392,077,572). Deputy Finance Minister Ahmad Maslan tabled the bill for the first reading at the Dewan Rakyat.

A total of 12 ministries, departments and agencies had applied for the supplementary expenditure which is an allocation to the Statutory Fund amounting to RM2,099,876,700; Public Service Department (RM55.6 million); Prime Minister's Department (RM53.4 million) and the Ministry of Works (RM50 million). In addition, the supplementary expenditure also involved the Ministry of Communications and Multimedia; Foreign Ministry; The Agriculture and Agro-based Industry Ministry; Home Ministry; and the Ministry of Energy, Green Technology and Water. The other ministries included the Ministry of Natural Resources and Environment; Science, Technology and Innovations Ministry; and the Ministry of Urban Wellbeing, Housing and Local Government.
