= Mahathir Cabinet =

Mahathir Cabinet is the name of either of seven cabinets of Malaysia:

- Mahathir Cabinet I (1981–1982)
- Mahathir Cabinet II (1982–1986)
- Mahathir Cabinet III (1986–1990)
- Mahathir Cabinet IV (1990–1995)
- Mahathir Cabinet V (1995–1999)
- Mahathir Cabinet VI (1999–2003)
- Mahathir Cabinet VII (2018–2020)
