= Simunjan =

Simunjan may refer to:

- Simunjan District
- Simunjan (federal constituency), formerly represented in the Dewan Rakyat (1971–90)
- Simunjan (state constituency), represented in the Sarawak State Legislative Assembly
