= Simunjan (federal constituency) =

Sarawak constituency

Defunct federal constituency
- Legislature: Dewan Rakyat
- Constituency created: 1968
- Constituency abolished: 1990
- First contested: 1969
- Last contested: 1986

Simunjan was a federal constituency in Sarawak, Malaysia, that was represented in the Dewan Rakyat from 1971 to 1990.

The federal constituency was created in the 1968 redistribution and was mandated to return a single member to the Dewan Rakyat under the first past the post voting system.

== History ==
It was abolished in 1990 when it was redistributed.

=== Representation history ===
Members of Parliament for Simunjan
Parliament	No	Years	Member	Party	Vote Share
Constituency created
		1969-1971	Parliament was suspended		
3rd	P127	1971-1973	Bojeng Andot (بوجيڠ اندوت)	BUMIPUTERA	4,920; 53.84%
3rd	P127	1973-1974	Bojeng Andot (بوجيڠ اندوت)	BN (PBB)	4,920; 53.84%
4th	P137	1974-1978	Hadadak D. Pasauk (هاددق د. ڤاساوق)	BN (PBB)	6,102; 75.10%
5th	P137	1978-1982	Bujang Ulis (بوجڠ اوليس)	BN (PBB)	5,738; 62.42%
6th	P137	1982-1986	Bujang Ulis (بوجڠ اوليس)	BN (PBB)	7,389; 83.93%
7th	P160	1986-1990	Bujang Ulis (بوجڠ اوليس)	BN (PERMAS)	7,382; 66.36%
Constituency abolished, split into Batang Lupar and Batang Sadong

=== State constituency ===
Parliamentary constituency	State constituency					
Parliamentary constituency	1969–1978	1978–1990	1990–1999	1999–2008	2008–2016	2016−present
Simunjan	Gedong					
Simunjan	Semera					

=== Historical boundaries ===
State Constituency	Area	
State Constituency	1968	1977
Gedong	Kampung Benat; Kampung Jirok; Kampung Spaoh; Kampung Telagus; Simunjan	Gedong; Kampung Benat; Kampung Spaoh; Kampung Sual; Simunjan
Semera	Kampung Jaie; Sadong Jaya; Sebangan; Sebuyau; Semera	

== Election results ==
Malaysian general election, 1986
Party	Candidate	Votes	%	∆%
BN	Bujang Ulis	7,382	66.36	▼17.57
Independent	Wan Habib Mahmud	3,742	33.64	▲33.64
Total valid votes		11,124	100.00	
Total rejected ballots		205		
Unreturned ballots		0		
Turnout		11,329	72.96	▲10.22
Registered electors		15,527		
Majority		3,640	32.72	▼35.14
BN hold		Swing		

Malaysian general election, 1982
Party	Candidate	Votes	%	∆%
BN	Bujang Ulis	7,389	83.93	▲21.51
Parti Anak Jati Sarawak	Bujang Amin	1,415	16.07	▼21.51
Total valid votes		8,804	100.00	
Total rejected ballots		323		
Unreturned ballots		0		
Turnout		9,127	62.74	▼14.13
Registered electors		14,547		
Majority		5,974	67.86	▲43.02
BN hold		Swing		

Malaysian general election, 1978
Party	Candidate	Votes	%	∆%
BN	Bujang Ulis	5,738	62.42	▼12.68
Parti Anak Jati Sarawak	Ambi Nen	3,454	37.58	▲37.58
Total valid votes		9,192	100.00	
Total rejected ballots		369		
Unreturned ballots		0		
Turnout		9,823	76.87	▲8.67
Registered electors		12,779		
Majority		2,284	24.84	▼25.36
BN hold		Swing		

Malaysian general election, 1974
Party	Candidate	Votes	%	∆%
BN	Hadadak D. Pasauk	6,102	75.10	▲75.10
SNAP	Abang Annuar Abang Junaidi	2,023	24.90	▼8.76
Total valid votes		8,125	100.00	
Total rejected ballots		827		
Unreturned ballots		0		
Turnout		8,952	68.20	▼12.73
Registered electors		13,126		
Majority		4,079	50.20	▲30.02
BN gain from PBB		Swing		?

Malaysian general election, 1969
Party	Candidate	Votes	%
PBB	Bojeng Andot	4,920	53.84
SNAP	Jubang Tawi	3,076	33.66
Independent	Bujang Amin	1,142	12.50
Total valid votes		9,138	100.00
Total rejected ballots		212	
Unreturned ballots		0	
Turnout		9,350	80.93
Registered electors		11,553	
Majority		1,844	20.18
This was a new constituency created.
