= Ministry of Housing and Local Government (Malaysia) =

Government ministry of Malaysia

- Kementerian Perumahan dan Kerajaan Tempatan (KPKT)
- Coat of arms of Malaysia

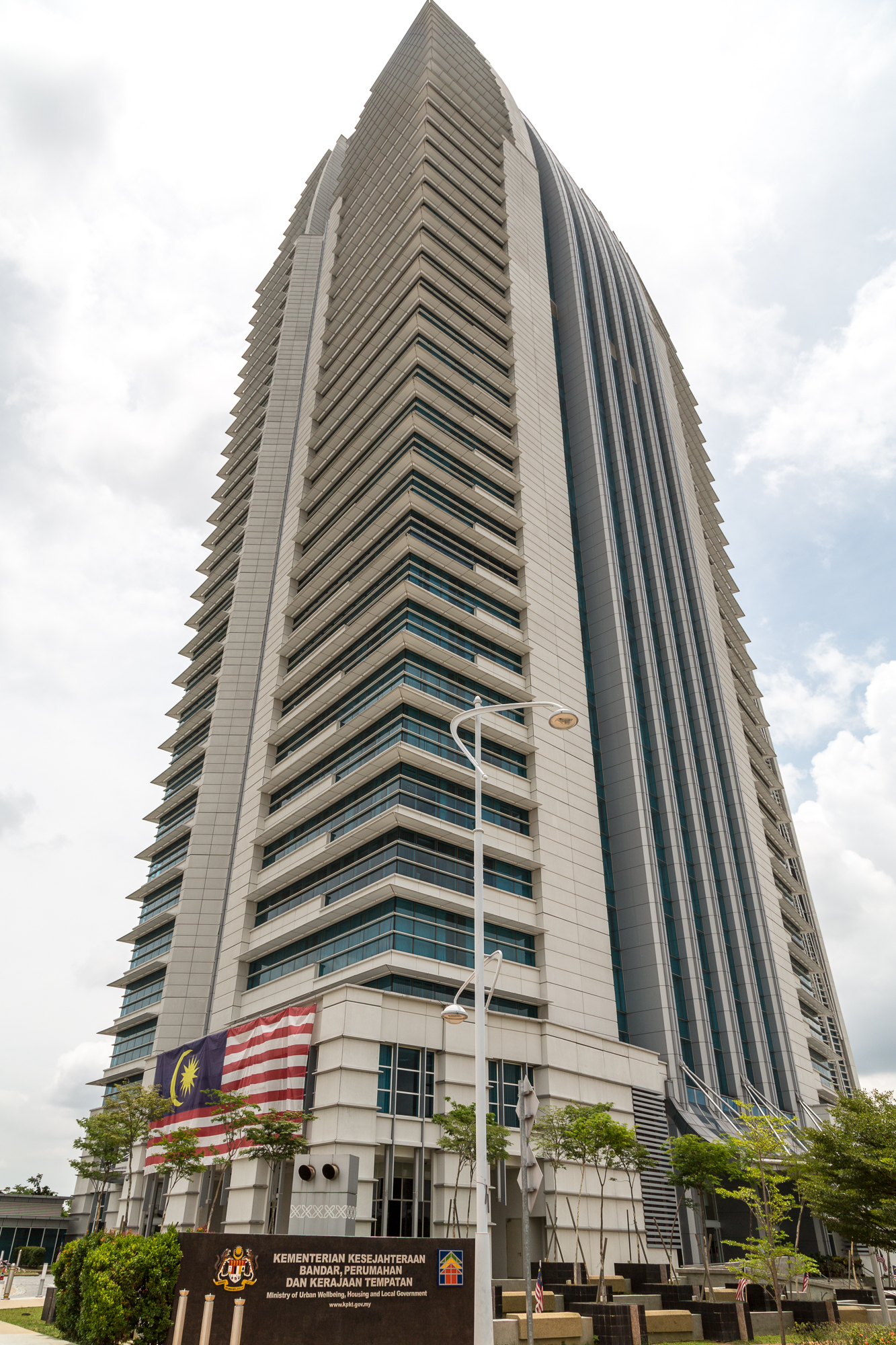

Ministry overview
- Formed: 16 May 2013; 13 years ago
- Preceding agencies: Ministry of Federal Territories and Urban Wellbeing; Ministry of Urban Wellbeing, Housing and Local Government; Ministry of Local Government Development
- Jurisdiction: Government of Malaysia
- Headquarters: No. 51, Persiaran Perdana, Precinct 4, Federal Government Administrative Centre, 62100 Putrajaya
- Motto: Prosperous Living (Kehidupan Sejahtera)
- Employees: 17,256 (2017)
- Annual budget: MYR 6,088,856,500 (2026)
- Minister responsible: Nga Kor Ming, Minister of Housing and Local Government
- Deputy Minister responsible: Datuk Hajah Aiman Athirah binti Sabu, Deputy Minister of Housing and Local Government
- Ministry executives: Datuk Wira M Noor Azman bin Taib, Secretary-General; Mohd Hazli bin Ahmad @ Adnan, Deputy Secretary-General (Sustainability and Strategic Planning); Zulkeflee bin Sulaiman, Deputy Secretary-General (Housing and Urban Wellbeing); Datuk Mohd Zamri bin Mat Zain, Deputy Secretary-General (Management and Development)
- Website: www.kpkt.gov.my

Footnotes
- Ministry of Housing and Local Government on Facebook

The Ministry of Housing and Local Government (Malay: Kementerian Perumahan dan Kerajaan Tempatan), abbreviated KPKT, is a ministry of the Government of Malaysia that is responsible for urban well-being, housing, local government, town planning, country planning, fire and rescue authority, landscape, solid waste management, strata management, moneylenders, pawnbrokers.

== Organisation ==
- Minister of Housing and Local Government
  - Deputy Minister of Housing and Local Government
    - Secretary-General
      - Under the Authority of Secretary-General
        - Legal Division
        - Corporate Communication Unit
        - Internal Audit Unit
        - Key Performance Indicator Unit
        - Integrity Unit
      - Deputy Secretary-General (Policy and Development)
        - Project Development and Implementation Division
        - Policy and Inspectorate Division
        - Secretariat and International Relations Division
      - Deputy Secretary-General (Urban Wellbeing)
        - Urban Wellbeing Division
        - Urbanization Service Division
        - Moneylenders and Pawnbrokers Division
      - Deputy Secretary-General (Management)
        - Finance and Procurement Division
        - Information Technology Division
        - Management Services Division
        - Human Resources Division
        - Account Division

=== Federal departments ===
1. Fire and Rescue Department of Malaysia, or Jabatan Bomba dan Penyelamat Malaysia. (Official site)
2. Local Government Department, or Jabatan Kerajaan Tempatan (JKT). (Official site)
3. National Housing Department, or Jabatan Perumahan Negara. (Official site)
4. National Solid Waste Management Department (NSWMD), or Jabatan Pengurusan Sisa Pepejal Negara (JPSPN). (Official site)

=== Federal agencies ===
1. Tribunal for Housing and Strata Management, or Tribunal Perumahan Dan Pengurusan Strata (TPPS).
2. Urban Wellbeing, Housing and Local Government Training Institute, or Institut Latihan Kesejahteraan Bandar, Perumahan dan Kerajaan Tempatan (I-KPKT). (Official site)
3. Solid Waste And Public Cleansing Management Corporation (SWCorp), or Perbadanan Pengurusan Sisa Pepejal Dan Pembersihan Awam (PPSPPA). (Official site)

== Key legislation ==
The Ministry of Housing and Local Government is responsible for administration of several key Acts:

Housing

- Housing Development (Control and Licensing) Act 1966 [Act 118]
- Building and Common Property (Maintenance and Management) Act 2007 [Act 663]
- Strata Management Act 2013 [Act 757]

Local Government

- Local Government Act 1976 [Act 171]
- Street, Drainage and Building Act 1974 [Act 133]

Solid Waste Management and Public Cleansing

- Solid Waste and Public Cleansing Management Act 2007 [Act 672]
- Solid Waste and Public Cleansing Management Corporation Act 2007 [Act 673]

Town and Country Planning

- Town and Country Planning Act 1976 [Act 172]
- Town Planners Act 1995 [Act 538]

Fire and Rescue Authority

- Fire Services Act 1988 [Act 341]

Moneylenders and Pawnbrokers

- Moneylenders Act 1951 [Act 400]
- Pawnbrokers Act 1972 [Act 81]

== Policy Priorities of the Government of the Day ==
- National Landscape Policy
- National Housing Policy
- National Affordable Housing Policy
- National Urbanization Policy
- National Physical Plan
- National Solid Waste Management Policy
- National Cleanliness Policy
- National Community Policy

== Programmes ==
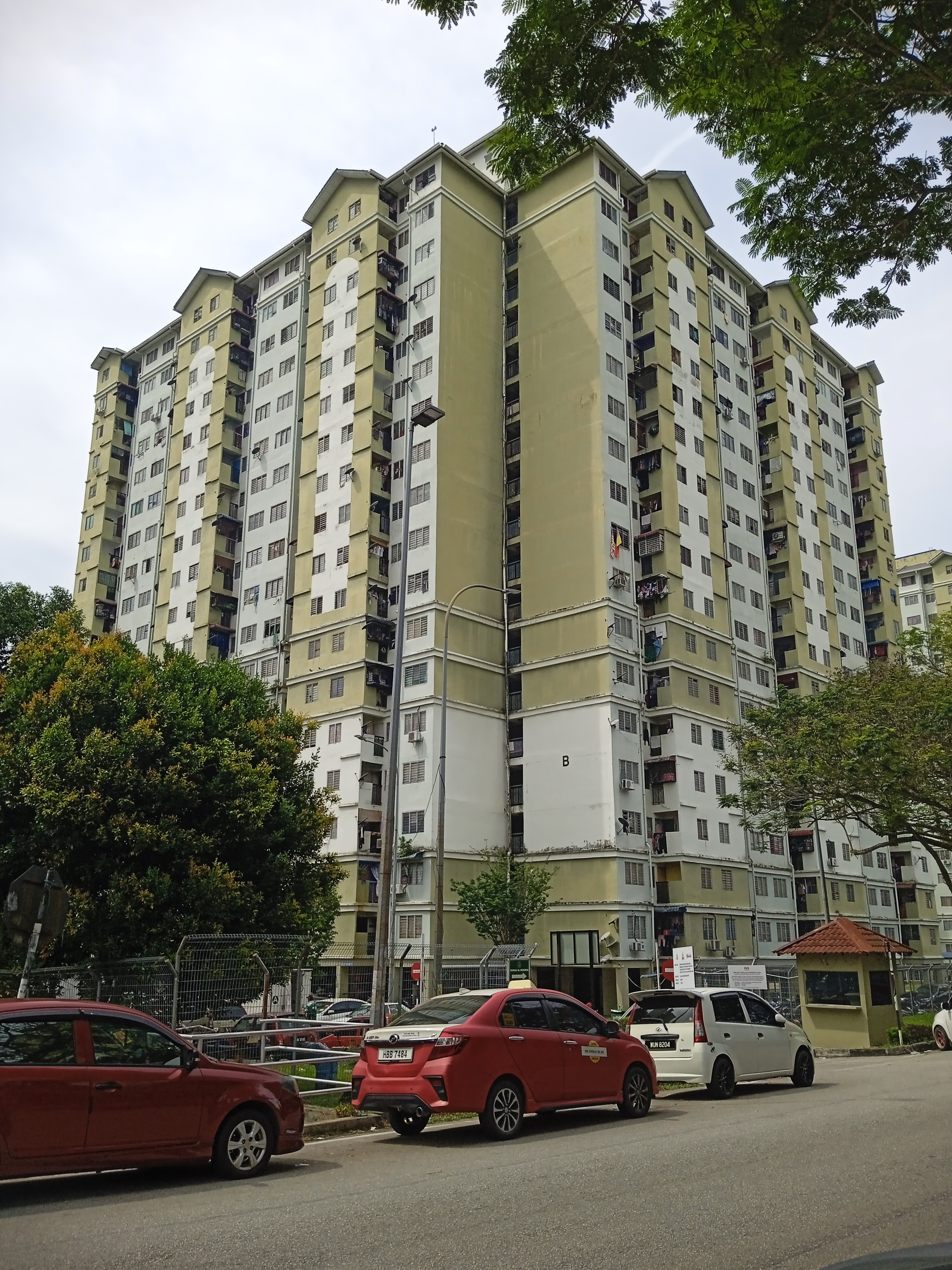
Projek Perumahan Rakyat program at Kota Damansara.

- National Blue Ocean Strategy (NBOS), or Strategi Lautan Biru Kebangsaan
  - My Beautiful Neighbourhood (MyBN), or Kejiranan Indah
  - My Beautiful Malaysia (MyBM), or Malaysiaku Indah
  - Youth Housing Scheme (MyYouth), or Skim Perumahan Belia
- Urban Planning, or Kesejahteraan Bandar
  - Centre of Excellence (COE), or Pusat Kecemerlangan
  - 1Malaysia Maintenance Fund, or Tabung Penyelenggaraan 1Malaysia (TP1M)
  - Housing Loan Scheme (HLS), or Skim Pinjaman Perumahan (SPP)
  - Housing Maintenance Program, or Program Penyelenggaraan Perumahan (PPP)
  - People's Housing Project, or Projek Perumahan Rakyat (PPR)
  - Private Affordable Housing Scheme (MyHome), or Skim Perumahan Mampu Milik Swasta
  - Transit House Program, or Program Rumah Transit
- Solid Waste, or Sisa Pepejal
  - Waste to Energy (WTE), or Sisa kepada Tenaga
  - Separation at Source (SAS), or Pengasingan Sisa Pepejal di Punca
- Urban Wellbeing
  - Residents Representative Committee, or Jawatankuasa Perwakilan Penduduk (JPP)
  - Residents Representative Council, or Majlis Perwakilan Penduduk (MPP)
- Moneylenders and Pawnbrokers
  - Moneylenders Advertisement Licenses and Permits, or Lesen dan Permit Iklan Pemberi Pinjam Wang
  - Pawnbrokers Advertisement Licenses and Permits, or Lesen dan Permit Iklan Pemegang Pajak Gadai

== Ministers ==
Minister	Portrait	Office	Executive Experience
Nga Kor Ming		Minister of Housing and Local Government	MLA for Pantai Remis (November 1999 – May 2013); MP for Taiping (March 2008 – May 2018); Member of the Perak State Executive Council (March 2008 – February 2009); MLA for Kepayang (May 2013 – May 2018; November 2022 – present); MP for Teluk Intan (May 2018 – current); MLA for Aulong (May 2018 – November 2022); Deputy Speaker of the Dewan Rakyat (July 2018 – July 2020); Minister of Local Government Development (December 2022 – December 2023)
Aiman Athirah Sabu		Deputy Minister of Housing and Local Government	Senator (August 2018 – August 2021); MP for Sepang (November 2022 – current); Deputy Minister of Women, Family and Community Development (December 2022 – December 2023)

== See also ==
- Minister of Housing and Local Government
