= Ministry of Human Resources (Malaysia) =

Government ministry of Malaysia

- Kementerian Sumber Manusia (KESUMA)/(MOHR) كمنترين سومبر مأنسي
- Coat of arms of Malaysia

Ministry overview
- Formed: 31 August 1957; 69 years ago
- Preceding Ministry: Ministry of Labour
- Jurisdiction: Government of Malaysia
- Headquarters: Level 6-9, Block D3, Complex D, Federal Government Administrative Centre, 62530 Putrajaya
- Employees: 8,611 (2017)
- Annual budget: MYR 1,240,485,000 (2017)
- Minister responsible: Steven Sim Chee Keong, Minister of Human Resources
- Deputy Minister responsible: Abdul Rahman Mohamad, Deputy Minister of Human Resources
- Ministry executives: Datuk Azman bin Yusof, Secretary-General; Dr Hj Mohd Shaharin bin Umar, Deputy Secretary-General (Policy and International); Sutekno bin Ahmad Belon, Deputy Secretary-General (Operations)
- Website: www.mohr.gov.my

Footnotes
- Ministry of Human Resources on Facebook

The Ministry of Human Resources (Malay: Kementerian Sumber Manusia; Jawi: كمنترين سومبر مأنسي), abbreviated KESUMA or MOHR, is a ministry of the Government of Malaysia that is responsible for skills development, labour, occupational safety and health, trade unions, industrial relations, industrial court, labour market information and analysis, social security. On 4 March 2024, the ministry was rebranded and started using the official acronym of KESUMA for all official business related to the ministry.

== Organisation ==
- Minister of Human Resources
  - Deputy Minister of Human Resources
    - Secretary-General
      - Under the Authority of Secretary-General
        - Legal Division
        - Internal Audit Unit
        - Corporate Communication Unit
        - Key Performance Indicator Unit
        - Integrity Unit
      - Deputy Secretary-General (Policy and International)
        - Policy Division
        - Institute of Labour Market Information and Analysis
        - International Division
        - National Wages Consultative Council
      - Deputy Secretary-General (Operations)
        - Development, Financial and Human Resources Division
        - Management Services Division
        - Account Division
        - Information Management Division
        - Inspectorate and Enforcement Division

=== Federal departments ===
1. Department of Labour of Peninsular Malaysia, or Jabatan Tenaga Kerja Semenanjung Malaysia (JTKSM). (Official site)
2. Department of Occupational Safety and Health (DOSH), or Jabatan Keselamatan dan Kesihatan Pekerjaan (JKKP). (Official site)
3. Industrial Court of Malaysia, or Mahkamah Perusahaan Malaysia. (Official site)
4. Manpower Department, or Jabatan Tenaga Manusia (JTM). (Official site)
5. Department of Skills Development (DSD), or Jabatan Pembangunan Kemahiran. (Official site)
  1. Centre for Instructor and Advanced Skill Training (CIAST), or Pusat Latihan Pengajar dan Kemahiran Lanjutan. (Official site)
6. Department of Trade Union Affairs, or Jabatan Hal Ehwal Kesatuan Sekerja (JHEKS). (Official site)
7. Department of Labour Sarawak, or Jabatan Tenaga Kerja Sarawak. (Official site)
8. Department of Labour Sabah, or Jabatan Tenaga Kerja Sabah. (Official site)
9. Department of Industrial Relations Malaysia, or Jabatan Perhubungan Perusahaan Malaysia (JPP). (Official site)
  1. Productivity-Linked Wage System (PLWS), or Sistem Upah yang Dikaitkan dengan Produktiviti. (Official site)

=== Federal agencies ===
1. Social Security Organisation (SOCSO), or Pertubuhan Keselamatan Sosial (PERKESO). (Official site)
2. Human Resources Development Fund (HRDF), or Kumpulan Wang Pembangunan Sumber Manusia (KWPSM). (Official site)
3. National Institute of Occupational Safety and Health (NIOSH), or Institut Keselamatan dan Kesihatan Pekerjaan Negara. (Official site)
4. Skills Development Fund Corporation, or Perbadanan Tabung Pembangunan Kemahiran (PTPK). (Official site)
5. Institute of Labour Market Information and Analysis (ILMIA), or Institut Maklumat Dan Analisa Pasaran Buruh. (Official site)

== See also ==
- Minister of Human Resources (Malaysia)
