= Ministry of Rural and Regional Development =

Government ministry of Malaysia

- Kementerian Kemajuan Desa dan Wilayah
- Coat of arms of Malaysia

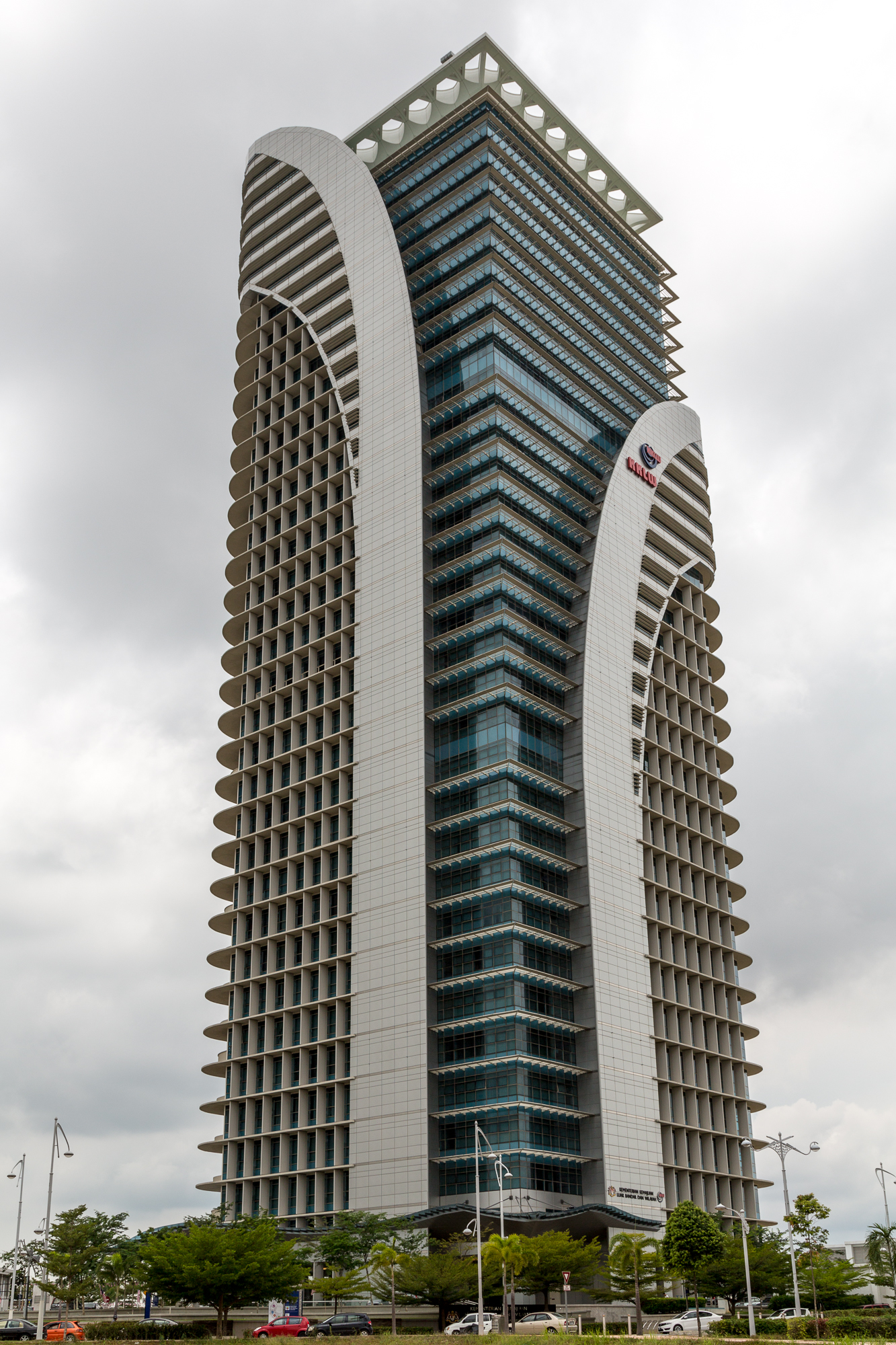

Ministry overview
- Formed: 3 December 2022; 3 years ago
- Preceding Ministry: Ministry of Rural Development
- Jurisdiction: Government of Malaysia
- Headquarters: No. 47, Persiaran Perdana, Precinct 4, Federal Government Administrative Centre, 62100 Putrajaya
- Motto: Prospering Rural Development (Luar Bandar Sejahtera)
- Employees: 29,620 (2022)
- Annual budget: MYR 12,401,611,100 (2026)
- Minister responsible: Dato' Seri Dr Ahmad Zahid bin Hamidi, Minister of Rural and Regional Development
- Deputy Minister responsible: Datuk Hajah Rubiah binti Haji Wang, Deputy Minister of Rural and Regional Development
- Ministry executives: Dato' Sri Suriani binti Dato' Ahmad, Secretary-General; Dato' Abdul Kahar bin Abdullah, Deputy Secretary-General (Policy); Dato' Dr Roslan bin Mahmood, Deputy Secretary-General (Development); Datuk Azman bin Mahmood, Senior Division Secretary (Management Services)
- Website: www.rurallink.gov.my

Footnotes
- Ministry of Rural and Regional Development on Facebook

The Ministry of Rural and Regional Development (Malay: Kementerian Kemajuan Desa dan Wilayah) is a ministry of the Government of Malaysia that is responsible for rural development, regional development, community development, Bumiputera, Orang Asli, rubber industry smallholders, land consolidation, land rehabilitation.

== Organisation ==
- Minister of Rural and Regional Development
  - Deputy Minister of Rural and Regional Development
    - Secretary-General
      - Under the Authority of Secretary-General
        - Corporate Communication Unit
        - Internal Audit Unit
        - Legal Unit
        - Integrity Unit
        - KPLB State Offices
      - Deputy Secretary-General (Policy)
        - Strategic Planning Division
        - Institute for Rural Advancement
        - Investments and Subsidiaries Monitoring Division
        - Rural Community Division
        - Rural Entrepreneurship Development Division
        - Community Economy Division
      - Deputy Secretary-General (Development)
        - Infrastructure Division
        - Coordination and Monitoring Division
        - People's Welfare Division
        - Land and Regional Development Division
        - Technical Division
      - Senior Division Secretary (Management Services)
        - Human Resource Management Division
        - Administrative and Asset Management Division
        - Finance Division
        - Procurement Division
        - Account Division
        - Information Management Division

=== Federal departments ===
1. Institute for Rural Advancement (INFRA), or Institut Kemajuan Desa. (Official site)
2. Community Development Department, or Jabatan Kemajuan Masyarakat (KEMAS). (Official site)
3. Department of Orang Asli Development, or Jabatan Kemajuan Orang Asli (JAKOA). (Official site)

=== Federal agencies ===
1. Council of Trust for the People, or Majlis Amanah Rakyat (MARA). (Official site)
2. Kedah Regional Development Authority, or Lembaga Kemajuan Wilayah Kedah (KEDA). (Official site)
3. Central Terengganu Development Authority, or Lembaga Kemajuan Terengganu Tengah (KETENGAH). (Official site)
4. South Kelantan Development Authority, or Lembaga Kemajuan Kelantan Selatan (KESEDAR). (Official site)
5. Southeast Johor Development Authority, or Lembaga Kemajuan Johor Tenggara (KEJORA). (Official site)
6. Penang Regional Development Authority, or Lembaga Kemajuan Wilayah Pulau Pinang (PERDA). (Official site)
7. Rubber Industry Smallholders Development Authority (RISDA) or Pihak Berkuasa Kemajuan Pekebun Kecil Perusahaan Getah (Official site)

== Ministers ==
Minister	Portrait	Office	Executive Experience
Ahmad Zahid Hamidi		Minister of Rural and Regional Development	MP for Bagan Datuk (April 1995 – current); Deputy Minister of Tourism (March 2004 – February 2006); Deputy Minister of Information (February 2006 – March 2008); Minister in the Prime Minister's Department (March 2008 – April 2009); Minister of Defence (April 2009 – May 2013); Minister of Home Affairs (May 2013 – May 2018); Deputy Prime Minister (July 2015 – May 2018; December 2022 – current); Leader of the Opposition (July 2018 – March 2019)
Rubiah Wang		Deputy Minister of Rural and Regional Development	MP for Kota Samarahan (May 2013 – current)

== See also ==
- Minister of Rural and Regional Development (Malaysia)
