= Department of Federal Territories (Malaysia) =

Government ministry of Malaysia

Ministry of Federal Territories
- Kementerian Wilayah Persekutuan (KWP) كمنترين ولايه ڤرسكوتوان
- Coat of arms of Malaysia

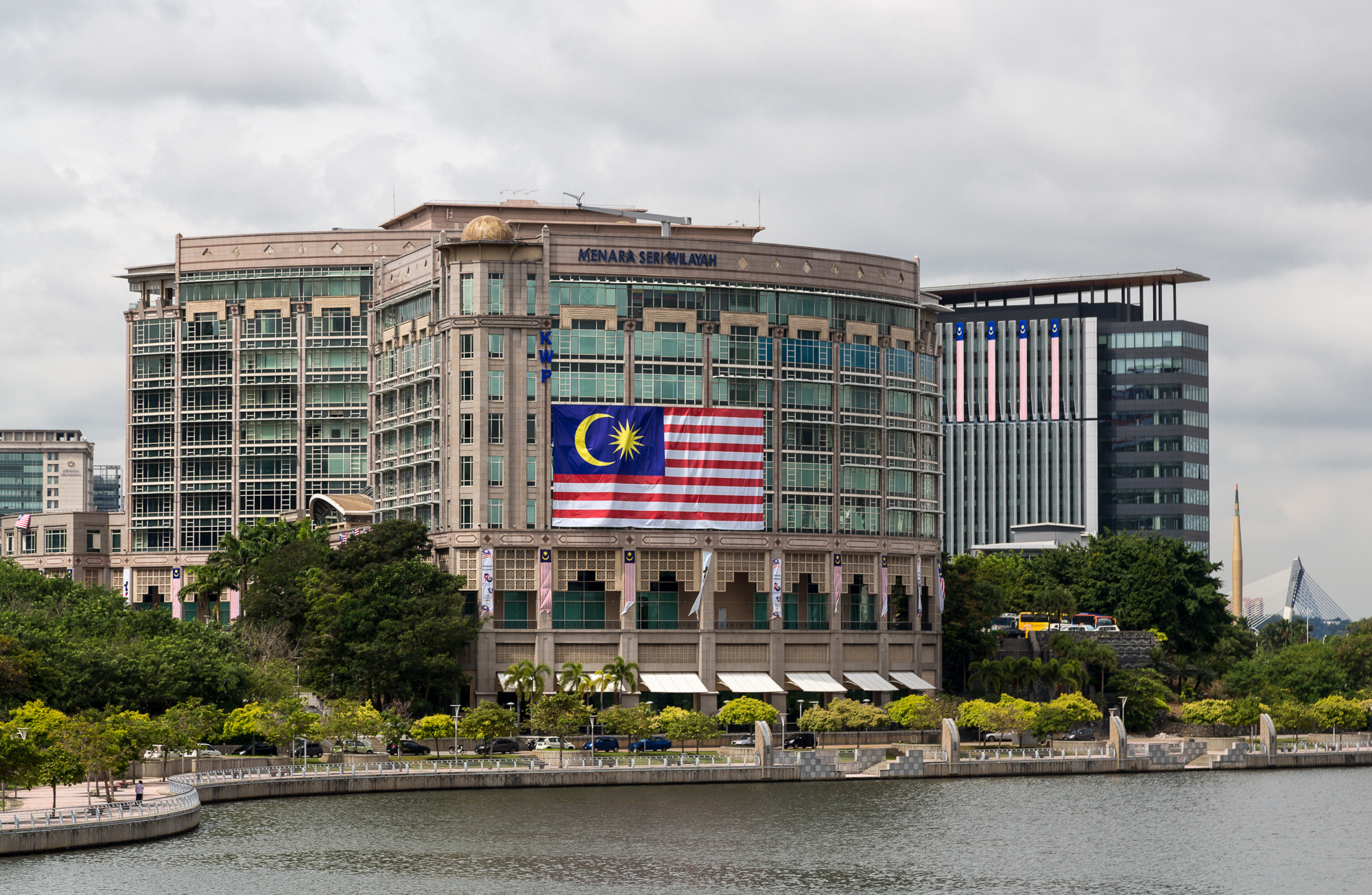

Department overview
- Formed: 1979; 47 years ago
- Preceding Department: Ministry of Federal Territories
- Jurisdiction: Government of Malaysia
- Headquarters: Block 1 & Block 2, Menara Seri Wilayah, Precinct 2, 62100 Putrajaya, Malaysia.
- Motto: Cheerful Territories, Prosperous People (Wilayah Ceria, Rakyat Sejahtera)
- Employees: 346 (2017)
- Annual budget: MYR 1,161,449,500 (2017)
- Minister responsible: Hannah Yeoh, Minister in the Prime Minister's Department (Federal Territories)
- Department executives: Dato' Indera Noridah binti Abdul Rahim, Director General; Datuk Ramlee Bin Yatim, Deputy Director General (Planning and Development); Dato' Parang Abai @ Thomas, Deputy Director General (Management and Socio-Economics)
- Website: www.jwp.gov.my

Footnotes
- Department of Federal Territories on Facebook

The Ministry of Federal Territories (Malay: Kementerian Wilayah Persekutuan; Jawi: كمنترين ولايه ڤرسكوتوان), abbreviated KWP, was a ministry and is now a department under the Prime Minister's Department of the Government of Malaysia that is in charge of overseeing the administration and development of all three Federal Territories in Malaysia; Kuala Lumpur, Labuan and Putrajaya.

It is based in Putrajaya with Adnan Md Ikshan as the Secretary-General.
