= Stephen Rundi Utom =

Malaysian politician

Yang Berhormat Dato Sri Stephen Rundi Utom PNBS PJN ABS PCE MLA
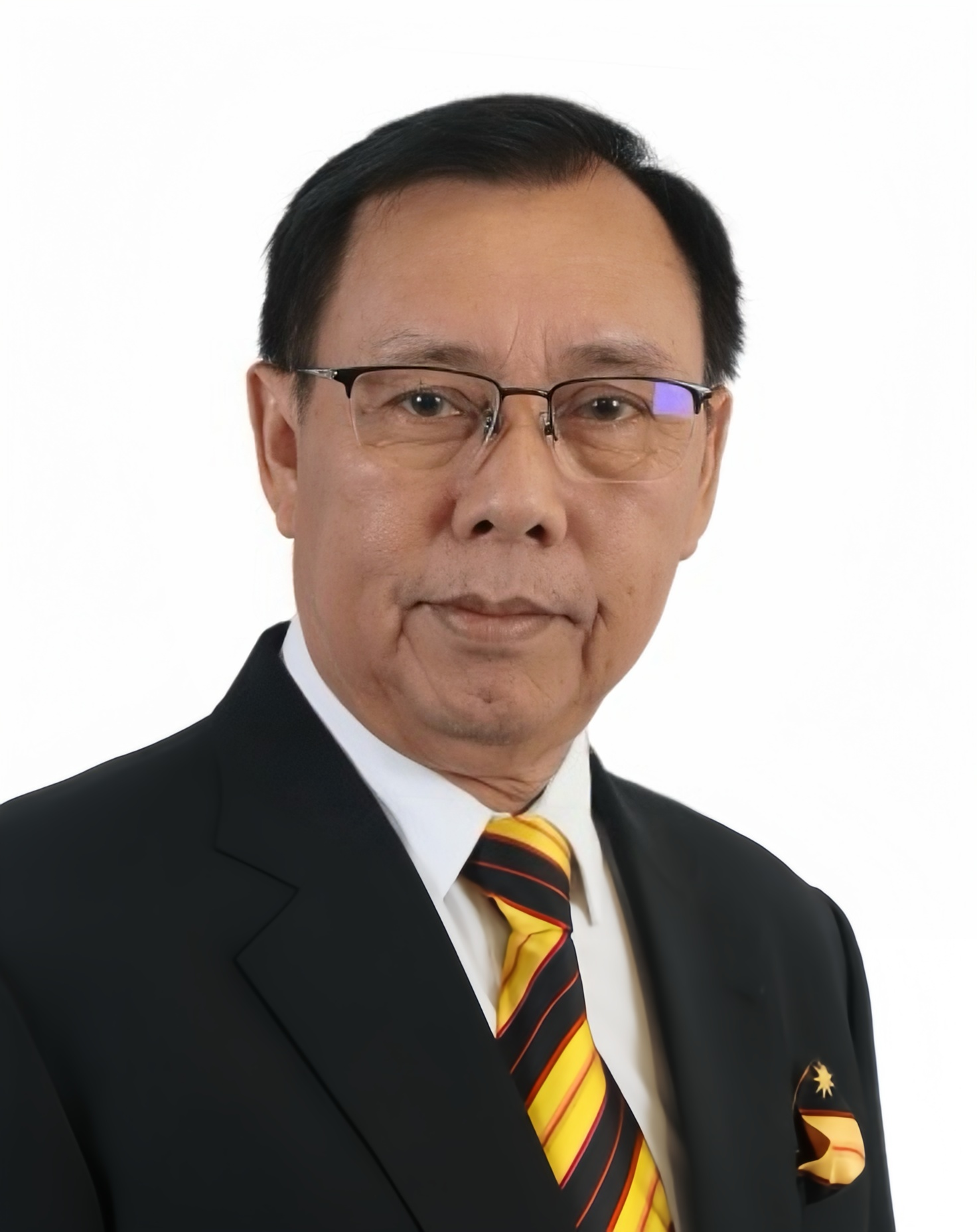
- Official portrait, 2021

Minister for Food Industry, Commodity and Regional Development
- Incumbent
- Assumed office 4 January 2022
- Governor: Abdul Taib Mahmud (2022–2024); Wan Junaidi Tuanku Jaafar (2024–present)
- Deputy: Abdul Rahman Ismail; Martin Ben
- Premier: Abang Johari
- Preceded by: Douglas Uggah Embas

Member of the Sarawak State Legislative Assembly for Kemena
- Incumbent
- Assumed office 27 September 2001
- Preceded by: Celestine Ujang Jilan

Personal details
- Born: Stephen Rundi anak Utom Sarawak
- Citizenship: Malaysian
- Party: PBB
- Other political affiliations: Barisan Nasional (till 2018); Gabungan Parti Sarawak (since 2018)
- Spouse: Loreta Rundi
- Occupation: Politician

Stephen Rundi anak Utom is a Malaysian politician and medical doctor. He is from PBB. He has served as the Member of the Sarawak State Legislative Assembly for Kemena since 2001. He is also the Sarawak Minister for Modernisation of Agriculture and Regional Development.

== Political career ==
Stephen is one of the senior vice-presidents of PBB.

== Election results ==
Sarawak State Legislative Assembly
Year	Constituency	Candidate	Votes	Pct.	Opponent(s)	Votes	Pct.	Ballots cast	Majority	Turnout
2001	N52 Kemena	Stephen Rundi Utom (PBB)	6,830	79.12%	David Kimay (DAP)	998	11.56%	8,764	5,832	64.15%
2001	N52 Kemena	Stephen Rundi Utom (PBB)	6,830	79.12%	John Brian Anthony Jeremy Guang (IND)	716	8.29%	8,764	5,832	64.15%
2001	N52 Kemena	Stephen Rundi Utom (PBB)	6,830	79.12%	Edward Galau Sigi (IND)	88	1.02%	8,764	5,832	64.15%
2006	N60 Kemena	Stephen Rundi Utom (PBB)	4,750	59.91%	John Brian Anthony Jeremy Guang (SNAP)	3,178	40.09%	8,053	1,572	60.37%
2011	N60 Kemena	Stephen Rundi Utom (PBB)	6,369	64.52%	Bernard Binar Bayang Rading (PKR)	3,020	30.59%	10,039	3,349	71.29%
2011	N60 Kemena	Stephen Rundi Utom (PBB)	6,369	64.52%	Ungun Bayang (SNAP)	285	2.89%	10,039	3,349	71.29%
2011	N60 Kemena	Stephen Rundi Utom (PBB)	6,369	64.52%	Liam Rengga (IND)	197	2.00%	10,039	3,349	71.29%
2016	N69 Kemena	Stephen Rundi Utom (PBB)	7,192	75.58%	Leighton Manjah (DAP)	2,324	24.42%	9,694	4,868	74.62%
2021	N69 Kemena	Stephen Rundi Utom (PBB)	6,339	62.82%	Bernard Tahim Bael (PSB)	2,728	27.03%	10,255	3,611	71.95%
2021	N69 Kemena	Stephen Rundi Utom (PBB)	6,339	62.82%	John Brian Anthony Jeremy Guang (DAP)	399	3.95%	10,255	3,611	71.95%
2021	N69 Kemena	Stephen Rundi Utom (PBB)	6,339	62.82%	Jame Stephen Randi Sekalai (IND)	331	3.28%	10,255	3,611	71.95%
2021	N69 Kemena	Stephen Rundi Utom (PBB)	6,339	62.82%	Chelea Vanessa William (PBK)	294	2.91%	10,255	3,611	71.95%

== Honours ==
- Malaysia :
  - Commander of the Order of Meritorious Service (PJN) — Datuk (2011)
- Sarawak :
  - Knight Commander of the Most Exalted Order of the Star of Sarawak (PNBS) – Dato Sri (2016)
