= Ministry of Domestic Trade and Costs of Living =

Government ministry of Malaysia

- Kementerian Perdagangan Dalam Negeri dan Kos Sara Hidup (KPDN)
- Coat of arms of Malaysia

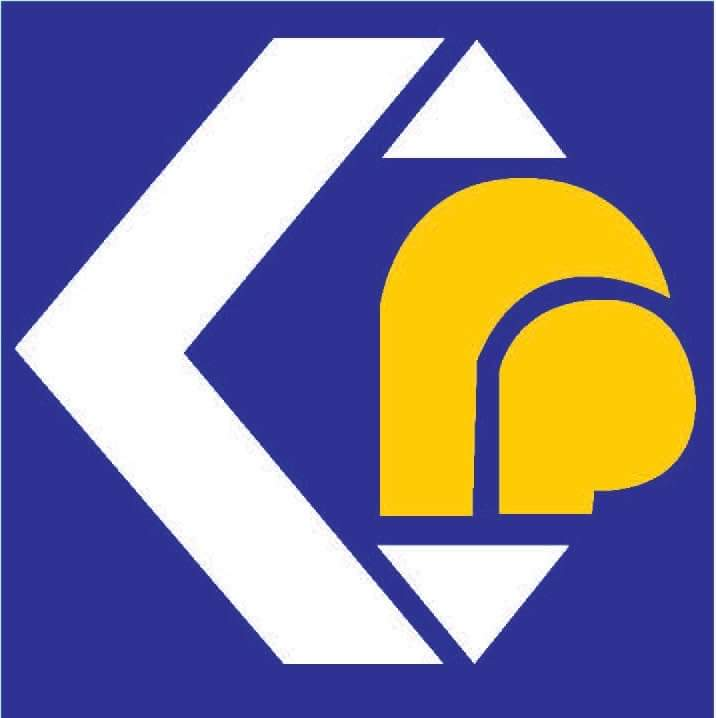

Ministry overview
- Formed: 3 December 2022 (3 years ago)
- Preceding agencies: Ministry of Domestic Trade and Cost of Living; Ministry of Domestic Trade and Cost of Living; Ministry of Domestic Trade and Cost of Living
- Jurisdiction: Government of Malaysia
- Headquarters: No. 13, Persiaran Perdana, Precinct 2, Federal Government Administrative Centre, 62623 Putrajaya
- Employees: 3,900 (2017)
- Annual budget: MYR 2,150,713,800 (2026)
- Minister responsible: Datuk Armizan bin Mohd Ali, Ministry of Domestic Trade and Cost of Living
- Deputy Minister responsible: Senator Datuk Dr. Hajah Fuziah binti Salleh, Deputy Minister of Domestic Trade and Cost of Living
- Ministry executives: Dato' Seri Mohd Sayuthi bin Bakar, Secretary-General; Datuk Roziah binti Abudin, Deputy Secretary-General (Domestic Trade); Vacant, Deputy Secretary-General (Consumer Empowerment)
- Website: www.kpdn.gov.my

Footnotes
- Ministry of Domestic Trade and Costs of Living on Facebook

The Ministry of Domestic Trade and Costs of Living (Malay: Kementerian Perdagangan Dalam Negeri dan Kos Sara Hidup), abbreviated KPDN, is a ministry of the Government of Malaysia that is responsible for domestic trade, living costs, co-operatives, consumerism, franchise and others.

== Organisation ==
- Minister of Domestic Trade and Costs of Living
  - Under the Authority of Minister
    - Competition Appeal Tribunal
  - Deputy Minister of Domestic Trade and Costs of Living
    - Secretary-General
      - Under the Authority of Secretary-General
        - Policy and Strategic Planning Division
        - Legal Division
        - Enforcement Division
        - Corporate Communication Unit
        - Petroleum Vehicles Subsidy Management Division
        - Internal Audit Division
        - Integrity Division
        - Delivery Management Office
        - Key Performance Indicator Unit
        - Ministry of Domestic Trade, Co-operatives and Consumerism State Offices
      - Deputy Secretary-General (Domestic Trade)
        - Franchise Development Division
        - Domestic Trade Division
        - Services Industry Division
        - Business Development Division
        - Co-operative Development Division
      - Deputy Secretary-General (Consumerism and Management)
        - Consumerism Movement Division
        - Research and Policy Division
        - Human Resources Division
        - Administration Services and Finance Division
        - Tribunal for Consumer Claims
        - Consumerism Standards Division
        - Information Management Division
        - Account Division

=== Federal agencies ===
1. Co-operative College of Malaysia, or Maktab Koperasi Malaysia (MKM). (Official site)
2. Companies Commission of Malaysia, Suruhanjaya Syarikat Malaysia (SSM). (Official site)
3. Malaysia Co-operative Societies Commission, or Suruhanjaya Koperasi Malaysia (SKM). (Official site)
4. Malaysia Competition Commission (MyCC), or Suruhanjaya Persaingan Malaysia. (Official site)
5. Intellectual Property Corporation of Malaysia (MyIPO), Perbadanan Harta Intelek Malaysia. (Official site)
6. Perbadanan Nasional Berhad (PNS). (Official site)
7. Bank Kerjasama Rakyat Malaysia Berhad (Bank Rakyat). (Official site)

== Key legislation ==
The Ministry of Domestic Trade and Costs of Living is responsible for administration of several key Acts:

Ministry of Domestic Trade and Costs of Living

- Weights and Measures Act 1972 [Act 71]
- Control of Supplies Act 1961 [Act 122]
- Petroleum Development Act 1974 [Act 144]
- Hire-Purchase Act 1967 [Act 212]
- Petroleum (Safety Measures) Act 1984 [Act 302]
- Exclusive Economic Zone Act 1984 [Act 311]
- Direct Sales and Anti-Pyramid Scheme Act 1993 [Act 500]
- Franchise Act 1998 [Act 590]
- Consumer Protection Act 1999 [Act 599]
- Optical Discs Act 2000 [Act 606]
- Electronic Commerce Act 2006 [Act 658]
- Price Control and Anti-Profiteering Act 2011 [Act 723]
- Trade Descriptions Act 2011 [Act 730]

Companies Commission of Malaysia

- Kootu Funds (Prohibition) Act 1971 [Act 28]
- Companies Act 1965 [Act 125]
- Registration of Businesses Act 1956 [Act 197]
- Companies Commission of Malaysia Act 2001 [Act 614]
- Langkawi International Yacht Registry Act 2003 [Act 630]
- Limited Liability Partnerships Act 2012 [Act 743]

Intellectual Property Corporation of Malaysia

- Trade Marks Act 1976 [Act 175]
- Patents Act 1983 [Act 291]
- Copyright Act 1987 [Act 332]
- Industrial Designs Act 1996 [Act 552]
- Layout-Designs of Integrated Circuits Act 2000 [Act 601]
- Geographical Indications Act 2000 [Act 602]
- Intellectual Property Corporation of Malaysia Act 2002 [Act 617]

Co-operative College of Malaysia

- Co-operative College (Incorporation) Act 1968 [Act 437]

Malaysia Co-operative Societies Commission

- Co-operative Societies Act 1993 [Act 502]
- Malaysia Co-operative Societies Commission Act 2007 [Act 665]

Bank Kerjasama Rakyat Malaysia Berhad

- Bank Kerjasama Rakyat Malaysia Berhad (Special Provisions) Act 1978 [Act 202]

Malaysia Competition Commission

- Competition Act 2010 [Act 712]
- Competition Commission Act 2010 [Act 713]

== Policy Priorities of the Government of the Day ==
- National Intellectual Property Policy
- Fair Trade Practices Policy
- National Consumer Policy
- National Co-operatives Policy

== Programmes ==
- 1Malaysia Pengguna Bijak
- Beli Barangan Buatan Malaysia
- 1Malaysia 1Harga
- Friends of KPDNKK
- Antipencatutan
- Kedai Rakyat 1Malaysia
- Menu Rakyat 1Malaysia
- Pemasaran Produk Usahawan IKS di Pasar Raya

== Legal Framework ==
The Federal Constitution allows Parliament to make laws related to trade, commerce and industry that include:

- production, supply and distribution of goods; price control and food control; adulteration of foodstuffs and other goods;
- imports into, and exports from, the Federation;
- incorporation, regulation and winding up of corporations other than municipal corporations (but including the municipal corporation of the federal capital); regulation of foreign corporations; bounties on production in or export from the Federation;
- insurance, including compulsory insurance;
- patents; designs, inventions; trade marks and mercantile marks; copyrights;
- establishment of standards of weights and measures;
- establishment of standards of quality of goods manufactured in or exported from the Federation;
- auctions and auctioneers;
- industries; regulation of industrial undertakings;
- subject to item 2(c) in the State List: Development of mineral resources; mines, mining, minerals and mineral ores; oils and oilfields; purchase, sale, import and export of minerals and mineral ores; petroleum products; regulation of labour and safety in mines and oilfields;
- factories; boilers and machinery; dangerous trades; and
- dangerous and inflammable substances.

== Ministers ==
Minister	Portrait	Office	Executive Experience
Armizan Mohd Ali		Minister of Domestic Trade and Costs of Living	MP for Papar (November 2022 – current); Minister in the Prime Minister's Department (December 2022 – December 2025)
Fuziah Salleh		Deputy Minister of Domestic Trade and Costs of Living	MP for Kuantan (March 2008 – November 2022); Deputy Minister in the Prime Minister's Department (July 2018 – February 2020); Senator (December 2022 – current)

== See also ==
- Minister of Domestic Trade and Costs of Living
