= Ministry of Works (Malaysia) =

Government ministry of Malaysia

- Kementerian Kerja Raya كمنترين كرجا راي (KKR)
- Coat of arms of Malaysia

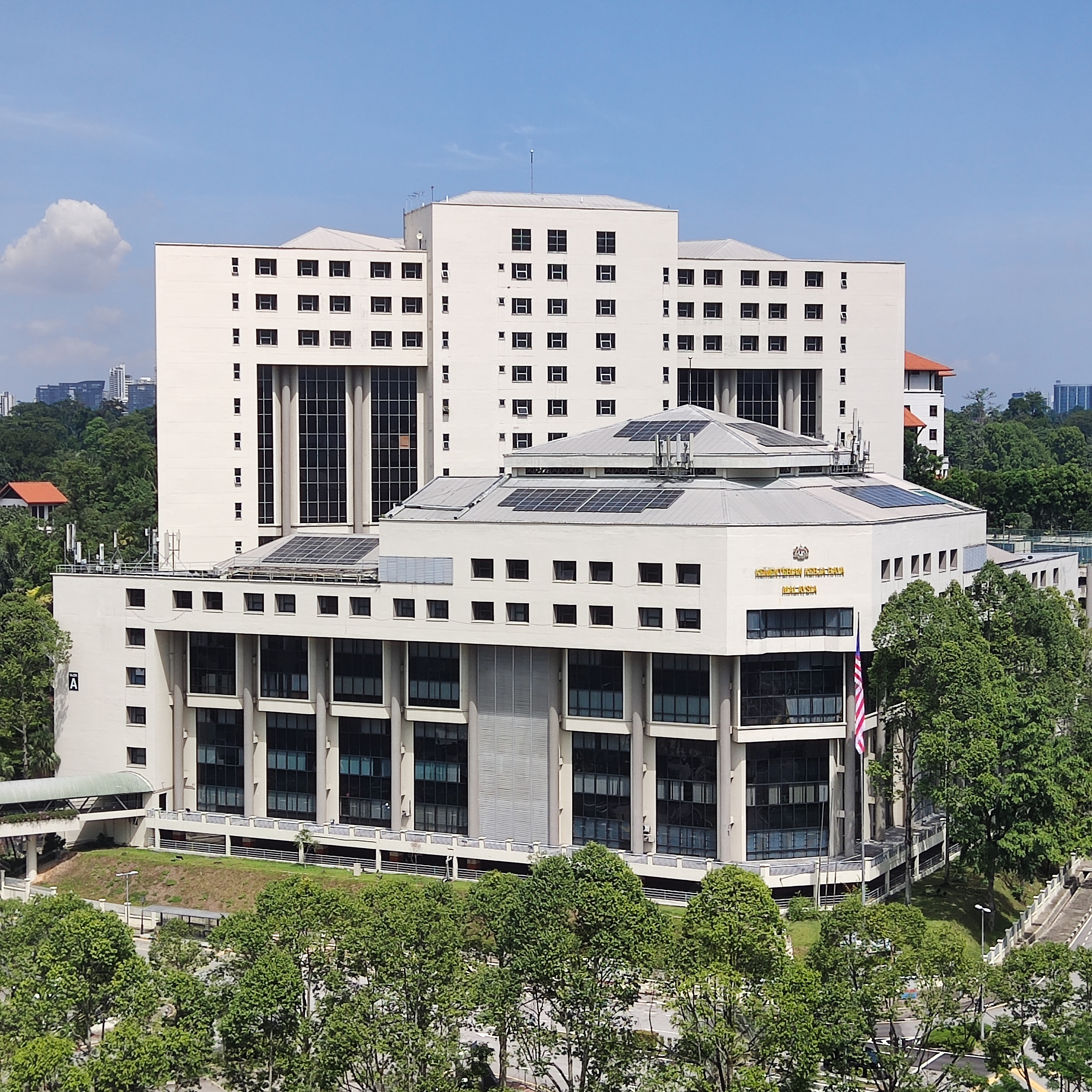
- Headquarters of Ministry of Works

Ministry overview
- Formed: 31 August 1957; 68 years ago
- Preceding Ministry: Ministry of Works and Public Amenities
- Jurisdiction: Government of Malaysia
- Headquarters: Kompleks Kerja Raya, Jalan Sultan Salahuddin, 50580 Kuala Lumpur
- Motto: Towards the People's Prosperity (Ke Arah Kesejahteraan Rakyat)
- Employees: 12,084 (2017)
- Annual budget: MYR 10,691,724,400 (2026)
- Minister responsible: Dato Seri Alexander Nanta Linggi, Minister of Work
- Deputy Minister responsible: Datuk Seri Ahmad bin Maslan, Deputy Minister of Work
- Ministry executives: Dato' Seri Azman bin Ibrahim, Secretary-General; Datuk Dr Khairus Masnan bin Abdul Khalid, Deputy Secretary-General (Policy and Development); Dato' Zainal Alhakab bin Seman, Deputy Secretary-General (Management)
- Website: www.kkr.gov.my

Footnotes
- Ministry of Works on Facebook

The Ministry of Works (Malay: Kementerian Kerja Raya; Jawi: كمنترين كرجا راي), abbreviated KKR, is a ministry of the Government of Malaysia that is responsible for public works, highway authority, construction industry, engineers, architects and quantity surveyors.

== Organisation ==
- Minister of Works
  - Deputy Minister of Works
    - Secretary-General
      - Under the Authority of Secretary-General
        - Legal Advisor's Office
        - Internal Audit Unit
        - Integrity Unit
        - Corporate Communication Unit
      - Deputy Secretary-General (Policy and Development)
        - Highway Planning Division
        - Policy and International Division
        - Development and Privatization Division
        - Facilities Management Division
      - Deputy Secretary-General (Management)
        - Human Resources Management Division
        - Management Services Division
        - Account Division
        - Finance Division
        - Corporate Planning Division
        - Information Management Division

=== Federal department ===
1. Malaysian Public Works Department, or Jabatan Kerja Raya Malaysia (JKR). (Official site)

=== Federal agencies ===
1. Malaysian Highway Authority, or Lembaga Lebuhraya Malaysia (LLM). (Official site)
2. Construction Industry Development Board Malaysia (CIDB), or Lembaga Pembangunan Industri Pembinaan Malaysia. (Official site)
3. Board of Engineers Malaysia (BEM), or Lembaga Jurutera Malaysia. (Official site)
4. Board of Architects Malaysia, or Lembaga Arkitek Malaysia (LAM). (Official site)
5. Board of Quantity Surveyors Malaysia (BQSM), or Lembaga Juruukur Bahan Malaysia. (Official site)

== Key legislation ==
The Ministry of Works is responsible for administration of several key acts of parliament.

== History ==
In 1954, the British government took several measures to separate the administration of the Malay Peninsula (Malaya) from its main administration centralised in Singapore. This marked the beginning point where the local government departments in the Malay Peninsula were permitted to implement their own policies and programs respectively. In 1956, the chief minister and several ministers were appointed to lead the Federation of Malay Peninsula.

In the same year, several ministries were formed including the Ministry of Works, which then was originally named the Ministry of Works, Post and Telecom. Sardon bin Haji Jubir was the first minister to lead this ministry. The functions and responsibilities of the Public Works Department were retained and put under the purview of the ministry’s administration. In 1957, the ministry was reorganised and renamed the Ministry of Works and Transportation.

The rapid progress made in the country's development and socioeconomic condition during the 1970s resulted in the increase of the ministry’s functions and roles. With the addition of new roles, the Ministry was renamed once more to the Ministry of Works and Public Amenities in 1978. However, in line with the specialisation of responsibilities, the government renamed the ministry as the Ministry of Works Malaysia in the 1980s.

== Ministers ==
Minister	Portrait	Office	Executive Experience
Alexander Nanta Linggi		Minister of Works	MP for Kapit (November 1999 – current); Deputy Minister of Rural and Regional Development (May 2013 – May 2018); Minister of Domestic Trade and Consumer Affairs (March 2020 – November 2022)
Ahmad Maslan		Deputy Minister of Works	MP for Pontian (March 2008 – current); Deputy Minister in the Prime Minister's Department (March 2009 – May 2013); Deputy Minister of Finance (May 2013 – July 2015; December 2022 – December 2025); Deputy Minister of International Trade and Industry (July 2015 – May 2018)

== See also ==
- Minister of Works (Malaysia)
