= Rosnah Shirlin =

Malaysian politician

Yang Berbahagia Datuk Rosnah Abdul Rashid Shirlin PGDK ASDK ADK JP
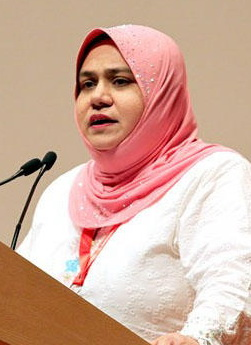

3rd Women Youth Chief of the United Malays National Organisation
- In office 26 March 2009 – 12 October 2013
- President: Najib Razak
- Deputy: Shahanim Mohamad Yusoff
- Preceded by: Noraini Ahmad
- Succeeded by: Mas Ermieyati Samsudin

Ministerial roles
- 2009–2013: Deputy Minister of Health
- 2013–2018: Deputy Minister of Works

Faction represented in Dewan Rakyat
- 2004–2018: Barisan Nasional

Other roles
- 2021–2022: Special Advisor to the Minister of Health

Personal details
- Born: Kota Belud, Sabah, Malaysia
- Party: United Malays National Organisation (UMNO)
- Other political affiliations: Barisan Nasional (BN); Perikatan Nasional (PN); Muafakat Nasional (MN)
- Spouse: Fadli Juanas (m. 2008)
- Education: International Islamic University Malaysia
- Occupation: Politician, lawyer
- Website: rosnah-shirlin.blogspot.com rosnahshirlin.blogspot.com

Rosnah binti Abdul Rashid Shirlin is a Malaysian politician who served as Special Advisor to the Minister of Health Khairy Jamaluddin from September 2021 to November 2022. She served as Deputy Minister of Works from May 2013 to May 2018 and Deputy Minister of Health from April 2009 to May 2013 in the Barisan Nasional (BN) administration under former Prime Minister Najib Razak, Minister Fadillah Yusof and former Minister Liow Tiong Lai as well as Member of Parliament (MP) for Papar from March 2004 to May 2018. She is member and Supreme Council member of the United Malays National Organisation (UMNO), a component party of the BN coalition. She also served as Women Youth Chief of UMNO from March 2009 to October 2013.

== Personal life ==
Rosnah was born in Kota Belud, Sabah, Malaysia. Her father was an engineer while her mother was a housewife. Rosnah married Fadli Juanas on 11 July 2008. Rosnah and her family live in her hometown of Papar, Sabah.

== Political career ==
Rosnah was elected to Parliament in the 2004 election, after being nominated by Barisan Nasional to replace its incumbent member Osu Sukam. Her election was unopposed. Before her election, she was a lawyer, and the head of UMNO's Puteri (female youth) wing in Sabah.

In March 2009 she became the head of UMNO's women's youth wing ("UMNO Puteri") and was subsequently appointed Deputy Minister for Health by incoming Prime Minister Najib Razak.

On 16 May 2013, after the 13th General Election, she was shifted from Deputy Health Minister to Deputy Works Minister. Also in 2013, she relinquished the leadership of UMNO Puteri due to her exceeding the organisation's age limit, and was elected to the Supreme Council of the full party.

== Election results ==
Parliament of Malaysia
| Year | Constituency | Candidate | Votes | Pct | Opponent(s) | Votes | Pct | Ballots cast | Majority | Turnout |
|---|---|---|---|---|---|---|---|---|---|---|
| 2004 | P175 Papar | Rosnah Abdul Rashid Shirlin (UMNO) | Unopposed | | | | | | | |
| 2008 | P175 Papar | Rosnah Abdul Rashid Shirlin (UMNO) | 15,352 | 64.43% | Wahap Idris (PKR) | 5,778 | 24.25% | 24,913 | 9,574 | 77.18% |
| 2008 | P175 Papar | Rosnah Abdul Rashid Shirlin (UMNO) | 15,352 | 64.43% | Patrick Sindu (IND) | 2,268 | 9.52% | 24,913 | 9,574 | 77.18% |
| 2008 | P175 Papar | Rosnah Abdul Rashid Shirlin (UMNO) | 15,352 | 64.43% | Mohd Hashim Yussup @ Yusof (IND) | 429 | 1.80% | 24,913 | 9,574 | 77.18% |
| 2013 | P175 Papar | Rosnah Abdul Rashid Shirlin (UMNO) | 21,196 | 64.83% | Yahya Lampong (PKR) | 10,661 | 32.61% | 33,262 | 10,535 | 85.79% |
| 2013 | P175 Papar | Rosnah Abdul Rashid Shirlin (UMNO) | 21,196 | 64.83% | Balon Mujim (STAR) | 838 | 2.56% | 33,262 | 10,535 | 85.79% |
| 2018 | P175 Papar | Rosnah Abdul Rashid Shirlin (UMNO) | 17,069 | 47.63% | Ahmad Hassan (WARISAN) | 17,394 | 48.54% | 36,540 | 325 | 83.83% |
| 2018 | P175 Papar | Rosnah Abdul Rashid Shirlin (UMNO) | 17,069 | 47.63% | Jamil William Core (STAR) | 892 | 2.49% | 36,540 | 325 | 83.83% |
| 2018 | P175 Papar | Rosnah Abdul Rashid Shirlin (UMNO) | 17,069 | 47.63% | Elbert Sikuil (PCS) | 481 | 1.34% | 36,540 | 325 | 83.83% |

== Honours ==
- Sabah
  - Commander of the Order of Kinabalu (PGDK) – Datuk (2008)
  - Companion of the Order of Kinabalu (ASDK) (2004)
  - Member of the Order of Kinabalu (ADK) (2002)
  - Justice of the Peace (JP) (2007)
