= Celestine Ujang Jilan =

Malaysian politician (c.1947–2018)

Tan Sri Celestine Ujang Jilan (c. 1947 – 10 January 2018) was a Malaysian politician from Sarawak. He served as a Sarawak Cabinet Minister (1974–81) including responsible for Housing and Land Development and was later elected Speaker of the Sarawak State Legislative Assembly (1981–87).

He was married to Puan Sri Elizabeth Pawa. Together they have three daughters - Malvina, Datin Angelina and Priscilla. Datin Sri Angelina is the wife of Dato' Sri Alexander Nanta Linggi, Minister of Domestic Trade and Consumer Affairs in the Perikatan Nasional government and former Deputy Minister of Rural and Regional Development in the Barisan Nasional government. He is also the Member of Parliament for Kapit.

== Political career ==
Ujang was elected to represent the State Constituency of Kemena in the Sarawak State Assembly from 1974 to 2001. In the 1998 party elections, he won the post of Vice-President of the Parti Pesaka Bumiputera Bersatu (PBB), a component party of the Barisan Nasional ruling party, unopposed. In 2007, Ujang retired from politics and did not seek reelection as Senior Vice-President. Ujang served as the Deputy Chairman of the Bintulu Development Authority from October 2003.

== Dayak Chamber of Commerce and Industry (DCCI) ==
In 2003, Ujang was appointed to the Dayak Chamber of Commerce and Industry (DCCI) Panel of Advisers After retiring from politics, Ujang was elected Deputy President in the Dayak Chamber of Commerce and Industry.

== Honours ==
- In 1982, he was awarded the Panglima Negara Bintang Sarawak which carries the title Dato Sri by His Excellency the Yang DiPertua Negeri Sarawak.
- In 2013, he was bestowed the Panglima Setia Mahkota, an award that carries the title Tan Sri, by His Majesty the XIV Yang DiPertuan Agong, Tuanku Al-Haj Abdul Halim Mu'adzam Shah Ibni Almarhum Sultan Badlishah. At the time, Ujang was the Executive Chairman of Harbour-Link Group Berhad.

== Death ==
Ujang died at the age of 70 on 10 January 2018 at a private hospital in Kuching, Sarawak.

== Entitled name after Tan Sri Celestine Ujang ==
- Jalan Tan Sri Celestine Ujang, Bintulu, Sarawak (formerly known as Jalan Kemunting/Sebaru).
