= Malaysian Public Works Department =

Government department of Malaysia

- Jabatan Kerja Raya Malaysia 马来西亚公共工程局 جابتن كرجا راي مليسيا

Department overview
- Formed: 1872; 154 years ago
- Jurisdiction: Government of Malaysia
- Headquarters: Jalan Sultan Salahuddin, Kuala Lumpur, Malaysia
- Minister responsible: Alexander Nanta Linggi, Minister of Works
- Department executive: Dato' Ir. Roslan Ismail, Director-General of Public Works
- Parent department: Ministry of Works Malaysia
- Website: www.jkr.gov.my

The Malaysian Public Works Department (PWD; Malay: Jabatan Kerja Raya Malaysia; Chinese: 马来西亚公共工程局; Jawi: جابتن كرجا راي مليسيا; officially abbreviated as JKR) is the federal government department in Malaysia under Ministry of Works (MOW) which is responsible for construction and maintenance of public infrastructure in West Malaysia and Labuan. In Sabah and Sarawak, a separate entity of Public Works Department exists under the two respective states government jurisdiction but both departments are also subordinate to the parent department at the same time.

== History ==
The position of Chief Engineer for the Straits Settlements was established in 1858. Singapore was a prominent holding camp for British colonial convicts in the Far East at the time. The British relied on soldiers to fill the positions of engineers and doctors. In each colony, an army officer from the engineering team will be stationed to monitor the civil works. Major McNair has come to Singapore to fill the position for this purpose.

The Straits Settlements were designated as a "Crown Colony" in 1867, and the post of Superintendent of PWD Singapore was renamed Colonial Engineer of the Straits Settlements at the same time. However, the date cannot be considered the beginning of PWD because the majority of the works is concentrated in Singapore. Only five years later, In 1872, a new department, the PWD of the Straits Settlements, was founded.

This is the starting point of JKR as a Malaysia organization. Major J.F.A. McNair, who had previously served as Executive Engineer and Superintendent of Prisoners, as well as the Colonial Engineer of the Straits Settlements in 1867, was the first person to lead the JKR organization in 1872, with Captain Shatterthwaite as the First Assistant Engineer at the state level in Penang.

The Department of Survey, which had been founded in 1839, was merged with the Colonial Engineer's office in 1871, as part of a consolidation policy launched by Sir Harry Ord and controlled by Major F.A. McNair. He reorganised the department in 1873, by assigned Captain W. Innes as First Assistant Engineer and Surveyor in the State of Penang and another in Melaka.

The job of Superintendent of Prisons was placed to the Colonial Engineer in 1848, and the prisoners were used for road and building construction. The Public Works Department retained this role until 1873, when the Prison Department was granted its own authority.

There were two separate Public Works Departments in Malaya until December 31, 1931. The Colonial Engineer of the Straits Settlements is responsible for the Straits Settlements whereas the Federated Malay States are under control of the Director of Works, Federated States and an Engineer is seconded to carry out duties for the Non-Federated Malay States.

On 1 January 1932 the two departments were merged into one Malayan Public Works Service based in Singapore with the names 'Director of Works, Straits Settlements' and 'Malay State Works Advisor'.

On the same date, the hydraulic branch of the Federated States of the Public Works Department was made a separate department called the Drainage and Irrigation Service headed by the 'Director of Drainage and Irrigation, Straits Settlements and Advisor for Drainage and Irrigation, Malay States'.

=== Timeline ===
- 1872 - Major J.F.A McNair founded and headed the Penang State PWD.
- February 1948 - The Organization of the Public Work Department was reorganized after the Federation of Malaya establishment.
- April 1951 - Public Works Department under Member Portfolio for Works and Housing.
- August 1955 - This department is under the Ministry of Works.
- 1956 - Placed under the Ministry of Works, Posts and Telecommunications.
- 1963 - Under the Ministry of Works, Posts, Energy and Telecommunications.
- 1976 - Public Work Department and Public Utilities
- 1983 - Under the Ministry of Works (until present)

== Lists of Director-Generals ==
The Colonial Engineers who have been in charge of the Public Works Department since the colony was taken over from the Indian Government (Straits Settlements (SS) - Malacca, Penang and Singapore) are:

1. Major J. F. A. McNair, R.A. (1867 to 1880); (1882-1884, McCallum acted in his position)
2. Major Henry Edward McCallum, R E., C.M.G. (1884-1897)
3. Colonel A. C. Alexander, R.E. (1897 to 1898)
4. Colonel Alexander Murray, C.E., Mem. Inst. C.E. (1898-1909)
5. Mr. F. J. Pigott (1910-1921)
6. J.H.W. Park, O.B.E (1921-1926)
7. Harry Venus Towner (1927–1929)

The PWD of the Federated Malay States, FMS (Pahang, Perak, Selangor and Negeri Sembilan) was established

1. Mr. F.St.G. Caufeild (1901-1907)
2. Mr. Robert Ogilvie Newton Anderson, B.A., A.I.B (1907-1910)
3. Mr. J. Trump (1913-unknown) or MR. W. EYRE-KENNY (1910-1923)
4. Mr. J. Strachan (1923-1925)
5. Mr. C.V.A. Espeut (1925-1927)
6. Leut-Colonel James Parry Swettenham (1928-1931)

Both the SS and FMS Departments were consolidated into one (1) Malayan Public Works service based in Singapore with the name of Director of Public Works, SS and Advisor on Public Works, Malay States.

1. Mr. G. Sturrock (1932-1935)
2. Major R.L. Nunn (1935-1940)

Malayan Union

1. Mr. W. Fairley (1946-1948)

Director of Public Works Department of Federation of Malaya (Consists of 11 states in Malaya - 9 Malay States and 2 British settlements of Penang and Malacca):

1. Mr. G. Edwards (May 1948-1953)
2. NANKIVELL Kenneth (Ken Nankivell) B.Sc. D.I.C., A.M.I.C.E, (1954-1957)
3. R.E. Pitt (1957-1959)
4. S.E Jewkes, O.B.E., J.M.N., B. Sc. (Eng), (1959-1962)
5. S.F. Owens (1962-1964)

After the Formation of Malaysia

1. Tan Sri Ir. Haji Yusoff bin Haji Ibrahim (1/8/1964 – 21/7/1972)
2. Ir. Thean Lip Thong (22/7/1972 – 14/4/1974)
3. Tan Sri Dato' Ir. Mahfoz bin Khalid (17/4/1974 – 5/12/1977)
4. Tan Sri Dato' Ir. Hj. Halaluddin bin Mohamed Ishak (6/12/1977-31/7/1981)
5. Tan Sri Ir. Haji Mohd Yusoff bin Mohd Yunus (1/8/1981 – 27/10/1983)
6. Dato' Ir. Ho Thian Hock (28/10/1983 – 9/12/1985)
7. Tan Sri Dato' Ir. Talha bin Mohd Hashim (10/12/1985 – 9/9/1990)
8. Tan Sri Dato' Ir. Wan Abd Rahman bin Haji Yaacob (10/9/1990 – 20/6/1996)
9. Tan Sri Dato' Ir. Omar bin Ibrahim (21/6/1996 – 9/9/1998)
10. Tan Sri Dato' Ir. Haji Zaini bin Omar (10/9/1998 – 1/6/2005)
11. Dato' Sri Ir. Dr. Wahid bin Omar (7/6/2005 – 30/4/2007)
12. Dato' Sri Ir. Dr. Judin bin Abdul Karim (1/5/2007 – 30/4/2012)
13. Dato' Seri Ir. Hj. Mohd Noor bin Yaacob (1/5/2012 – 31/3/2014)
14. Dato’ Ir. Annies Bin Md Ariff (1/4/2014-30/4/2015)
15. Datuk Ir. Adanan bin Mohamed Hussain (1/7/2015 – 8/6/2016)
16. Dato' Sri Ir. Dr. Roslan bin Md Taha (24 Ogos 2016 – Mar 2019)
17. Dato' Ir. Dr. Meor Abdul Aziz bin Haji Osman (25 April 2019)
18. Ir. Kamaluddin bin Abdul Rashid (22 November 2019)
19. Datuk Ir. Haji Mohamad Zulkefly bin Sulaiman (24 July 2020 – 5 January 2023)
20. Datuk Ir. Ahmad Redza Ghulam Rasool (5 January – 8 December 2023)
21. Dato' Ir. Roslan Ismail (10 December 2023 – present)

== Sectors ==
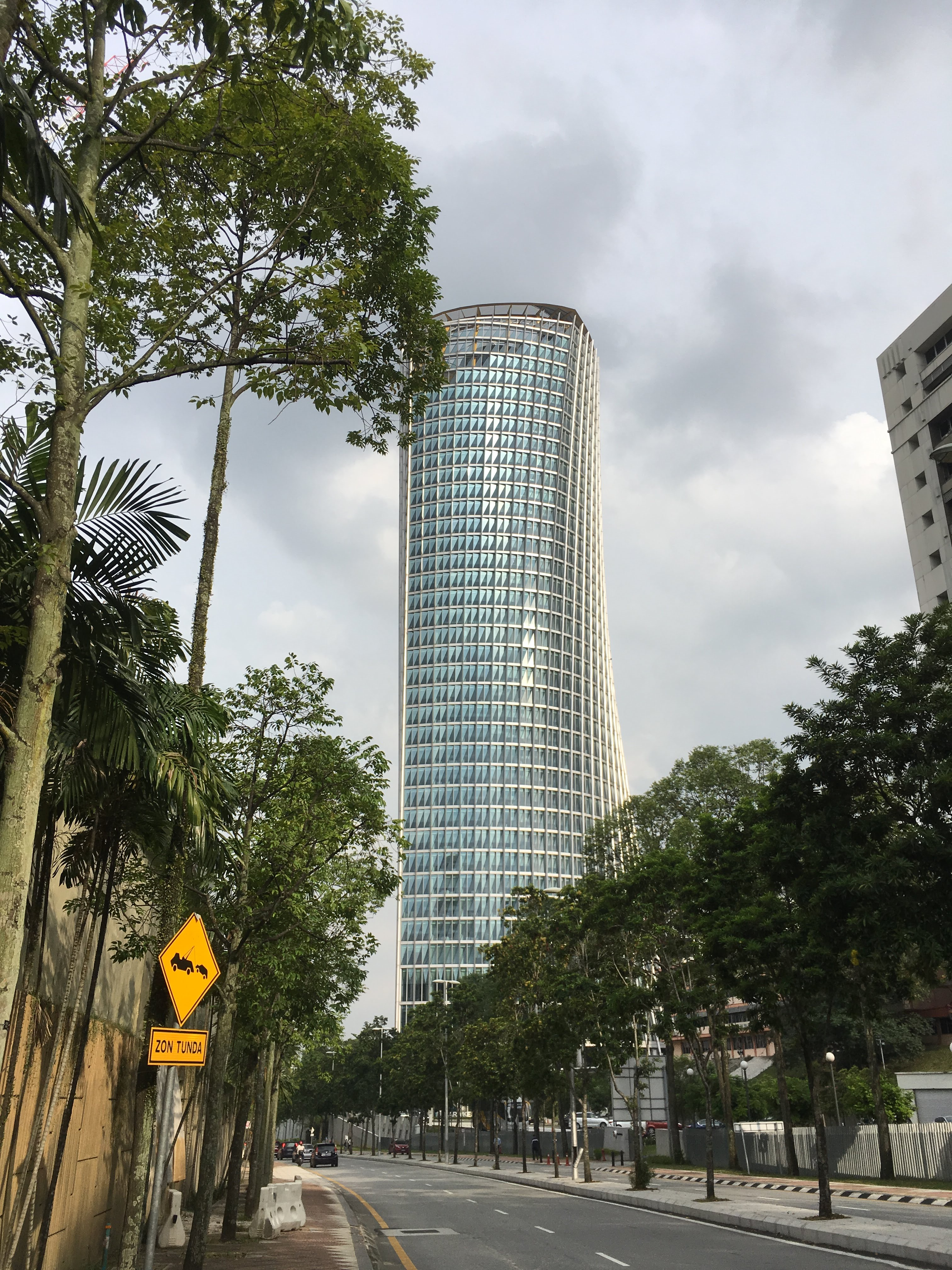
Menara Kerja Raya, the PWD Headquarters in Kuala Lumpur, seen from Jalan Sultan Salahuddin.

=== Building sectors ===
The JKR's Building Sectors (Malay: Sektor bangunan) is responsible for building and maintaining government buildings in Malaysia such as public government offices, schools, hospitals, police and army facilities etc. It consists of:-

1. General Building Works 1 Branch (Cawangan Kerja Bangunan Am 1)
2. General Building Works 2 Branch (Cawangan Kerja Bangunan Am 2)
3. Building Facilities Maintenance Branch (Cawangan Senggara Fasiliti Bangunan)
4. Health Works Branch (Cawangan Kerja Kesihatan)
5. Security Works Branch (Cawangan Kerja Keselamatan)
6. Education Works Branch (Cawangan Kerja Pendidikan)

=== Infrastructure sectors ===
The JKR's Infrastructure Sectors (Malay: Sektor infra) is responsible for building and maintaining roads Malaysia such as federal roads, state roads, bridges, slopes and interchanges as well as building airport, maritime and railway in Malaysia. It consists of:-

1. Roads Branch (Cawangan Jalan)
2. Road Facilities Maintenance Branch (Cawangan Senggara Fasiliti Jalan)
3. Slope Engineering Branch (Cawangan Kejuruteraan Cerun)
4. Transportation Infrastructure Engineering Branch (Cawangan Kejuruteraan Infrastruktur Pengangkutan)

=== Specialist sectors ===
The Specialist Sectors (Malay: Sektor pakar) undertakes any pre-contract activities especially during project development stage in term of In-House design, geotechnical design and consultancy design services. Expert Sectors also embarks in providing professional services such as structural integrity and building safety assessment. It consists of:-

1. Civil and Structural Engineering Branch (Cawangan Kejuruteraan Awam dan Struktur)
2. Architect Branch (Cawangan Arkitek)
3. Electrical Engineering Branch (Cawangan Kejuruteraan Elektrik)
4. Mechanical Engineering Branch (Cawangan Kejuruteraan Mekanikal)
5. Geotechnical Engineering Branch (Cawangan Kejuruteraan Geoteknik)
6. Environment and Energy Efficiency Branch (Cawangan Alam Sekitar dan Kecekapan Tenaga)
7. Contract and Quantity Surveying Branch (Cawangan Kontrak dan Ukur Bahan)

=== Management sectors ===
The Management Sectors (Malay: Sektor pengurusan) functions to develop strategic plan on project monitoring and reporting. The branch is also provides support services of the department in terms of human resource management and enhances the competencies of officers through human resource development. The core function of this sector is to support the Infrastructure, Building and Specialist Sector in achieving quality development and maintenance of infrastructure with geotechnical and structural investigation work as well as laboratory services for quality control testing, verification and validation. It consists of:-

1. Policy and Corporate Management Branch (Cawangan Dasar dan Pengurusan Korporat)
2. Integrated Asset Planning Branch (Cawangan Perancangan Aset Bersepadu)
3. Center of Excellence for Engineering and Technology, CREaTE (Pusat Kecemerlangan Kejuruteraan dan Teknologi JKR)

== List of JKR infrastructures ==
- Federal roads
- State roads
- Public hospitals and healthcare facilities
- Public schools
- Public government buildings

== See also ==
- Malaysian national projects
- Malaysian Highway Authority
- Malaysian Expressway System
