= Companies Commission of Malaysia =

Malaysian government agency for corporate and business affairs

Coordinates: 3°10′00″N 101°41′33″E

- Suruhanjaya Syarikat Malaysia (SSM)

Executive agency overview
- Formed: 2002
- Preceding Executive agency: Registrar of Companies and Registry of Business
- Jurisdiction: Peninsular Malaysia, Federal Territories, Sabah & Sarawak
- Headquarters: Menara SSM, KL Sentral, Kuala Lumpur
- Minister responsible: Salahuddin Ayub, Minister of Domestic Trade and Living Costs
- Deputy Minister responsible: Fuziah Salleh, Deputy Minister of Domestic Trade and Living Costs
- Executive agency executive: Dr. Azman Bin Hussin, Chief Executive Officer and Registrar
- Parent department: Ministry of Domestic Trade and Consumer Affairs
- Key document: Companies Commission of Malaysia Act 2001
- Website: www.ssm.com.my

The Companies Commission of Malaysia (Malay: Suruhanjaya Syarikat Malaysia, abbreviated SSM) is a statutory body formed under an Act of Parliament that regulates corporate and business affairs in Malaysia. The SSM was formed in 2002 under the Companies Commission of Malaysia Act 2001, assuming the functions of the Registrar of Companies and Registry of Business.

The main purpose of SSM is to serve as an agency to incorporate companies and register businesses as well as to provide company and business information to the public. The commission launched SSM e-Info Services to allow information on companies and businesses obtainable via its website.

As the leading authority for the improvement of corporate governance in Malaysia, the commission also handles monitoring and enforcement activities to ensure compliance with business registration and corporate legislation.

Business owners can choose to incorporate their business as a Sole Proprietorship or Partnership, incorporate their company as a Company Limited by Shares, a Company Limited by Guarantee or a Company Unlimited, or incorporate a Limited Liability Partnership.

== History ==
In 2003, the SSM began a review of the Companies Act 1998, with the aim of simplifying the process of incorporation in Malaysia and reducing businesses' costs of compliance with Malaysian corporate law. This law was eventually replaced by Companies Act 2016, which carries some major changes such as only one director is needed to register the company as a Company Limited by Shares instead of two, heavier penalties on directors who do not comply with the Act, and Annual General Meeting (AGM) is no longer mandatory to be held by private companies.

== Registering a Sole Proprietorship or Partnership ==
1. Fill out Form A, the Business Registration Form, with the following information:
  1. Business Name
  2. Commencement Date
  3. Principal Place of Business
  4. Address of the Branches (if applicable)
  5. Owner and Partner(s) Information
  6. Type of Business
  7. Copy of the Partnership Agreement (if applicable)
2. Submit the Form along with the following documents to the nearest SSM counter:-
  1. Photocopy of Owner and Partner(s) NRIC
  2. Permit, License or Supporting Letter for your Business (if applicable) - e.g. nurseries, which need a permit from the Department of Social Welfare
  3. Approval or Supporting Letter from Relevant Agency (if required by the Registrar of Business)
3. Registration fees are available at SSM Website

Understand more on the differences of Sole Proprietorship and Partnership in Malaysia

== Legal Framework ==
Acts and regulations that SSM operates under are listed as below:

=== Acts ===
- Companies Commission of Malaysia Act 2001 (Act 614) as at 1 March 2018
- Companies Act 2016 (Act 777) as at 1 November 2018
- Companies Act 1965 (Repealed)
- Interest Schemes Act (Act 778)
- Registration of Businesses Act 2016 (Act 197) as at 1 June 2017
- Limited Liability Partnerships Act (Act 743) as at 1 March 2017
- Trust Companies Act 1949 (Act 100) as at 1 January 2006
- Kootu Funds (Prohibition) Act 1971 (Act 28)

=== Regulations ===
Any subsidiary legislation made under the Acts specified above such as: Companies Regulations 1966; and Registration of Businesses Rules 1957.

- Companies Commission of Malaysia (Licensing of Secretaries) Regulations 2017
- Companies Regulations 2017
- Companies (Amendment) Regulations 2018
- Companies (Practising Certificate For Secretaries) Regulations 2019
- Interest Schemes Regulations 2017
- Limited Liability Partnerships Regulations 2012
- Limited Liability Partnerships (Amendment) Regulations 2016

== See also ==
- List of company registers
