= Kedup =

State constituency in Sarawak, Malaysia

Kedup (N22)
Sarawak constituency

State constituency
- Legislature: Sarawak State Legislative Assembly
MLA
Vacant
- Constituency created: 1996
- First contested: 1996
- Last contested: 2026

Kedup is a state constituency in Sarawak, Malaysia, that has been represented in the Sarawak State Legislative Assembly since 1996.

The state constituency was created in the 1996 redistribution and is mandated to return a single member to the Sarawak State Legislative Assembly under the first past the post voting system.

== Demographics ==
Ethnic breakdown of Kedup's electorate as of 2022
1. Sarawak bumiputera (91.5%)
2. Chinese (6.80%)
3. Malay-Muslim bumiputera (1.10%)
4. Other ethnicities (0.60%)

== History ==
As of 2020, Kedup has a population of 18,030 people.

=== Polling districts ===
According to the gazette issued on 31 October 2022, the Kedup constituency has a total of 4 polling districts.

State constituency	Polling Districts	Code	Location
Kedup (N22)	Sibauh	199/22/01	SK St. Anthony Kawan; Dewan Serbaguna Kpg Mayang Mawang; Dewan Babuk Salim; Balai Raya Kpg. Bugu; Balai Raya Kpg. Prangkan Marung; SK Sg. Rimu; SK St. John Mentong; SK Mubok Berawan; Dewan Serbaguna Kpg Pridan; Balai Raya Kpg. Sanggai Mawang
Kedup (N22)	Mongkos	199/22/02	SK Mentu Tapu; SK St. Michael Mongkos; Multipurpose Hall Kpg Mongkos; Tadika Kpg. Nibong; SK St. Nobert Paom Gahat
Kedup (N22)	Kedup	199/22/03	SK Mapu; Balai Raya Kpg. Terbat Leban; Balai Raya Babuk Barem Kpg. Bunan Gega
Kedup (N22)	Antayan	199/22/04	SK Krangan; SK Merbau; Balai Raya Kpg. Sg. Buru; SK Krait; SK Sumpas; SJK (C) Sg. Menyan; SK Entayan; SK Semukoi

=== Representation history ===
Members of the Legislative Assembly for Kedup
Assembly	No	Years	Member	Party
Constituency created from Tebedu, Simunjan and Tarat
14th	N17	1996-2001	Frederick Bayoi Manggie	BN (PBB)
15th	N17	2001-2006	Frederick Bayoi Manggie	BN (PBB)
16th	N19	2006-2011	Frederick Bayoi Manggie	BN (PBB)
17th	N19	2011-2016	Martin Ben	BN (PBB)
18th	N22	2016-2018	Martin Ben	BN (PBB)
18th	N22	2018-2021	Martin Ben	GPS (PBB)
19th	N22	2021–2026	Martin Ben	GPS (PBB)

== Election results ==
Sarawak state election, 2026: Kedup
Party	Candidate	Votes	%	∆%
GPS	Martin Ben			▲
PBK	Stephen Morgan Sungan			▲
PH				▲
Total valid votes				
Total rejected ballots				
Unreturned ballots				
Turnout				
Registered electors				
Majority				

Sarawak state election, 2021: Kedup
Party	Candidate	Votes	%	∆%
GPS	Martin Ben	5,178	63.34	▲63.34
PSB	Dominic Dado Sagin	1,612	19.72	▲19.72
PBK	Stephen Morgan Sungan	745	9.11	▲9.11
DAP	Learry Jabul	640	7.83	▼16.81
Total valid votes		8,175	100.00	
Total rejected ballots		129		
Unreturned ballots		19		
Turnout		8,323	74.30	▼2.85
Registered electors		11,202		
Majority		3,566	43.62	▼4.97
GPS gain from BN		Swing		?
Source(s) https://lom.agc.gov.my/ilims/upload/portal/akta/outputp/1718688/PUB687.pdf

Sarawak state election, 2016: Kedup
Party	Candidate	Votes	%	∆%
BN	Martin Ben	5,769	73.23	▲18.12
DAP	Andrew Nyabe	1,941	24.64	▲24.64
PBDS Baru	Mark Murau Sumon	168	2.13	▲2.13
Total valid votes		7,878	100.00	
Total rejected ballots		105		
Unreturned ballots		17		
Turnout		8,000	77.15	▲7.71
Registered electors		10,370		
Majority		3,828	48.59	▲29.32
BN hold		Swing		
Source(s) "Federal Government Gazette - Notice of Contested Election, State Legislative Assembly of the State of Sarawak [P.U. (B) 190/2016]" (PDF). Attorney General's Chambers of Malaysia. 25 April 2016. Archived from the original (PDF) on 2017-06-12. "Senarai Calon yang Disahkan Layak Bertanding Pilihan Raya Dewan Undangan Negeri ke-11". Election Commission of Malaysia. 25 April 2016. Archived from the original on 25 April 2016.

Sarawak state election, 2011: Kedup
Party	Candidate	Votes	%	∆%
BN	Martin Ben	6,476	55.11	▼5.55
PKR	Lainus Andrew Luwak	4,211	35.84	▲35.84
SNAP	Sylvester Belayong Jayang	666	5.67	▼33.67
Independent	Amin Banti	397	3.38	▲3.38
Total valid votes		11,750	100.00	
Total rejected ballots		165		
Unreturned ballots		213		
Turnout		12,128	69.44	▲9.79
Registered electors		17,466		
Majority		2,265	19.28	▼2.05
BN hold		Swing		
Source(s) "Federal Government Gazette - Results of Contested Election and Statements of the Poll after the Official Addition of Votes Sarawak [P.U. (B) 245/2011]" (PDF). Attorney General's Chambers of Malaysia. 29 April 2011.

Sarawak state election, 2006: Kedup
Party	Candidate	Votes	%	∆%
BN	Frederick Bayoi Manggie	5,635	60.66	▼12.87
SNAP	Razali Bolhi @ Bujang Bolhi	3,654	39.34	▲39.34
Total valid votes		9,289	100.00	
Total rejected ballots		216		
Unreturned ballots		36		
Turnout		9,541	59.65	▼0.27
Registered electors		15,994		
Majority		1,981	21.33	▼41.19
BN hold		Swing		

Sarawak state election, 2001: Kedup
Party	Candidate	Votes	%	∆%
BN	Frederick Bayoi Manggie	8,254	73.53	▲4.43
Independent	Corbold Lusoi	1,238	11.03	▲11.03
Independent	Augustine Bagat Sikut	988	8.80	▲8.80
PKR	Akaw Nojep	745	6.64	▲6.64
Total valid votes		11,225	100.00	
Total rejected ballots		181		
Unreturned ballots		130		
Turnout		11,536	59.92	▲2.55
Registered electors		19,252		
Majority		7,016	62.50	▲24.29
BN hold		Swing		

Sarawak state election, 1996: Kedup
Party	Candidate	Votes	%
BN	Frederick Bayoi Manggie	6,978	69.10
Independent	Lainus Andrew Luwak	3,120	30.90
Total valid votes		10,098	100.00
Total rejected ballots		229	
Unreturned ballots		55	
Turnout		10,382	57.37
Registered electors		18,095	
Majority		3,858	38.21
This was a new constituency created.
