= Jalan Sultan Salahuddin =

Road in Malaysia

Major junctions
- West end: Mahameru
- Kuala Lumpur Middle Ring Road 1 Jalan Tun Ismail; Jalan Dato' Onn; Jalan Parlimen; FT 1 Kuala Lumpur Inner Ring Road
- East end: Bulatan Dato' Onn

Location
- Country: Malaysia

Highway system
- Highways in Malaysia; Expressways; Federal; State

Jalan Sultan Salahuddin (formerly Swettenham Road) is a major road in Kuala Lumpur, Malaysia. It was named after Almarhum Sultan Salahuddin Abdul Aziz Shah of Selangor, the eleventh Yang di-Pertuan Agong.

== List of junctions ==
km	Exit	Junctions	To	Remarks
		Mahameru	Kuala Lumpur Middle Ring Road 1 North; Sentul; Segambut; Ipoh; Kuantan South; Jalan Duta; Damansara; Bangsar; Petaling Jaya; Seremban	Diamond interchange
		Wisma Tani		
		Department of Irrigation and Drainage (DID) headquarters		
		Peninsula Malaysia Forestry Department		
		Persiaran Sultan Salahuddin	South; Persiaran Sultan Salahuddin; Istana Selangor; Tugu Negara	T-junctions
		Malaysian Ministry of Works (MOW) main headquarters		
		Jalan Tun Ismail	Jalan Tun Ismail North; Jalan Dato' Onn; Memorial Tunku Abdul Rahman; Universiti Malaya (UM) Kampus Kota; Open University of Malaysia (OUM) South; Malaysian Ministry of Works (MOW) main headquarters Malaysian Public Works Department (JKR) main headquarters Dewan Tan Sri Mahfuz Khalid	Junctions
		Malaysian Public Works Department (JKR) main headquarters		
		Jalan Dato' Onn	North; Jalan Dato' Onn; Memorial Tunku Abdul Rahman; BNM Currency Museum; Bank Negara Komuter station	T-junctions
		Bank Negara Malaysia main headquarters		
		Bulatan Dato' Onn	West; Jalan Parlimen (Club Road); Malaysian Houses of Parliament; Jalan Duta; Damansara; Perdana Lake Gardens; Tugu Negara FT 1 Kuala Lumpur Inner Ring Road North; Jalan Kuching; Jalan Sultan Ismail; Segambut; Ipoh; Kuantan South; Jalan Kinabalu; Seremban; Petaling Jaya; Shah Alam; Klang Southeast; Dataran Merdeka Sultan Abdul Samad Building; Selangor Club; St Mary's Church; Kuala Lumpur City Library	Roundabout
