= Bukit Kota =

State constituency in Sarawak, Malaysia

Bukit Kota (N79)
Sarawak constituency

State constituency
- Legislature: Sarawak State Legislative Assembly
MLA
Vacant
- Constituency created: 2005
- First contested: 2006
- Last contested: 2026

Bukit Kota is a state constituency in Sarawak, Malaysia that has been represented in the Sarawak State Legislative Assembly since 2006.

The state constituency was created in the 2005 redistribution and is mandated to return a single member to the Sarawak State Legislative Assembly under the first past the post voting system.

== Demographics ==
Ethnic breakdown of Bukit Kota's electorate as of 2022
1. Malay-Muslim bumiputera (53.8%)
2. Chinese (25.1%)
3. Sarawak bumiputera (17.0%)
4. Other ethnicities (4.10%)

== History ==
As of 2020, Bukit Kota has a population of 31,733 people.

=== Polling districts ===
According to the Official Gazette dated 31 October 2022, the Bukit Kota constituency has a total of 10 polling districts.

State constituency	Polling Districts	Code	Location
Bukit Kota（N79）	Ranggau	221/79/01	SK Limpakau Pinang
Bukit Kota（N79）	Sebukang	221/79/02	SK Limpaki; Dewan Kpg. Patiambun; Tadika Kemas Limbang
Bukit Kota（N79）	Tabahan	221/79/03	SK Kampung Pahlawan; SK Kubong; Dewan SK Batu 4 Jln Pandaruan
Bukit Kota（N79）	Bangkita	221/79/04	SK Melayu Pusat Limbang
Bukit Kota（N79）	Limbang	221/79/05	SJK (C) Chung Hua Limbang
Bukit Kota（N79）	Poyan	221/79/06	SK Sg. Poyan; Dewan PIBG, SK Melayu Pusat
Bukit Kota（N79）	Bukit Kota	221/79/07	Dewan Kpg. Buangsiol
Bukit Kota（N79）	Pendam	221/79/08	SK Gadong; Dewan Kpg. Pendam
Bukit Kota（N79）	Telahak	221/79/09	Dewan SK Telahak; Surau Kpg. Ipai; SK Meritam
Bukit Kota（N79）	Berawan	221/79/10	Dewan Inspirasi SMK Kubong; SK R.C. Kubong; Balai Raya Kpg. Batu Bakarang; Dewan SK Bukit Loba; SK Meramut; Surau (Halaman) Kpg. Pangkalan Rejab

=== Representation history ===
Members of the Legislative Assembly for Bukit Kota
Assembly	NO	Years	Member	Party
Constituency created, renamed from Limbang
16th	N68	2006-2011	Abdul Rahman Ismail	BN (PBB)
17th	N68	2011-2016	Abdul Rahman Ismail	BN (PBB)
18th	N79	2016-2018	Abdul Rahman Ismail	BN (PBB)
18th	N79	2018-2021	Abdul Rahman Ismail	GPS (PBB)
19th	N79	2021–2026	Abdul Rahman Ismail	GPS (PBB)

== Election results ==
Sarawak state election, 2026: Bukit Kota
Party	Candidate	Votes	%	∆%
GPS				▲
PH				▲
Total valid votes				
Total rejected ballots				
Unreturned ballots				
Turnout				
Registered electors				
Majority				

Sarawak state election, 2021: Bukit Kota
Party	Candidate	Votes	%	∆%
GPS	Abdul Rahman Ismail	6,454	78.80	▲78.80
PSB	Rosli Amat	1,468	17.92	▲17.92
PBK	Lim Lian Hun	206	2.52	▲2.52
Independent	Herun Bungsu	62	0.76	▲0.76
Total valid votes		8,190	100.00	
Total rejected ballots		61		
Unreturned ballots		62		
Turnout		8,313	46.97	
Registered electors		16,975		
Majority		4,986	60.88	
GPS gain from BN		Swing		?
Source(s) https://lom.agc.gov.my/ilims/upload/portal/akta/outputp/1718688/PUB687.pdf

Sarawak state election, 2016: Bukit Kota
Party	Candidate	Votes	%	∆%
On the nomination day, Abdul Rahman Ismail won uncontested.
BN	Abdul Rahman Ismail			
Total valid votes			100.00	
Total rejected ballots				
Unreturned ballots				
Turnout				
Registered electors		16,437		
Majority				
BN hold		Swing		{{{2}}}
Source(s) "Federal Government Gazette - Notice of Contested Election, State Legislative Assembly of the State of Sarawak [P.U. (B) 190/2016]" (PDF). Attorney General's Chambers of Malaysia. 25 April 2016. Archived from the original (PDF) on 12 June 2017. "Senarai Calon yang Disahkan Layak Bertanding Pilihan Raya Dewan Undangan Negeri ke-11". Election Commission of Malaysia. 25 April 2016. Archived from the original on 2016-04-25. "Federal Government Gazette - Notice of Contested Election, State Legislative Assembly of the State of Sarawak Corrigendum [P.U. (B) 191/2016]" (PDF). Attorney General's Chambers of Malaysia. 26 April 2016. Archived from the original (PDF) on 2017-06-13.

Sarawak state election, 2011: Bukit Kota
Party	Candidate	Votes	%	∆%
BN	Abdul Rahman Ismail	6,835	73.02	▲2.54
DAP	Leong Kwang Yew	1,774	18.95	▲18.95
Independent	Usop Jidin	398	4.25	▲4.25
Independent	Ladis Pandin	353	3.78	▲3.78
Total valid votes		9,360	100.00	
Total rejected ballots		65		
Unreturned ballots		45		
Turnout		9,470	65.44	▲6.25
Registered electors		14,471		
Majority		5,061	54.07	▲12.70
BN hold		Swing		{{{2}}}
Source(s) "Federal Government Gazette - Results of Contested Election and Statements of the Poll after the Official Addition of Votes Sarawak [P.U. (B) 245/2011]" (PDF). Attorney General's Chambers of Malaysia. 29 April 2011.

Sarawak state election, 2006: Bukit Kota
Party	Candidate	Votes	%
BN	Abdul Rahman Ismail	5,501	70.48
Independent	Said Mohidin	2,272	29.11
Independent	Ali Abdullah	32	0.41
Total valid votes		7,805	100.00
Total rejected ballots		64	
Unreturned ballots		21	
Turnout		7,890	59.19
Registered electors		13,328	
Majority		3,229	41.37
This was a new constituency created.
