= Board of Engineers Malaysia =

Engineering organization of Malaysia

- Lembaga Jurutera Malaysia (Malay) 马来西亚工程师委员会 (Chinese)
- Abbreviation: BEM
- Formation: August 23, 1972; 54 years ago
- Type: Statutory Authority
- Headquarters: Board of Engineers Malaysia Tingkat 17, Blok F Ibu Pejabat JKR Jalan Sultan Salahuddin 50580 Kuala Lumpur
- Location: Kuala Lumpur, Malaysia
- Members: 101,478 (2016)
- Parent organization: Ministry of Works (Malaysia)
- Website: bem.org.my

Chinese name
- Simplified Chinese: 马来西亚工程师委员会
- Traditional Chinese: 馬來西亞工程師委員會
Transcriptions
Standard Mandarin
- Hanyu Pinyin: Mǎláixīyà Gōngchéngshī Wěiyuánhuì

The Board of Engineers Malaysia (BEM; Malay: Lembaga Jurutera Malaysia (LJM)) is a federal statutory body constituted under the Registration of Engineers Act 1967 (Act 138) (REA 1967) with perpetual succession and a common seal. It was inaugurated on 23rd August 1972. BEM's primary responsibility is to register qualified individuals (referred to as registered Persons) and engineering consultancy practices in the engineering profession; accredit engineering degree and diploma programs and assess academic qualifications of applicants.

The registration of individuals includes Professional Engineers with Practising Certificate, Professional Engineers, Accredited Checkers (Structural), Accredited Checkers (Geotechnical), Graduate Engineers, Engineering Technologists, and Inspectors of Works. Engineering Consultancy Practices (ECP) encompass Body Corporates, Multi-disciplinary Practices, Partnerships, and Sole Proprietorships.

Additionally, BEM regulates the professional conduct and practices of registered Persons to safeguard the safety and interest of the public.

BEM operates under the purview of the Ministry of Works (Malaysia) and is vested with broad powers. The Minister may suspend the operation of the Registration of Engineers Act 1967 (REA 1967) in any part of Malaysia through notification in the gazette. The appointment of Board Members and the Registrar is made by the Minister.
