= Ahmad Hassan (Malaysian politician) =

Malaysian politician

Member of the Malaysian Parliament for Papar
- In office 9 May 2018 – 19 November 2022
- Preceded by: Rosnah Shirlin (BN–UMNO)
- Succeeded by: Armizan Mohd Ali (GRS–Sabah BERSATU)
- Majority: 325 (2018)

Faction represented in Dewan Rakyat
- 2018–2022: Heritage Party

Personal details
- Born: 31 December 1960 (age 65) Papar, Crown Colony of North Borneo (now Sabah, Malaysia)
- Citizenship: Malaysian
- Party: Heritage Party (WARISAN)
- Occupation: Politician

Ahmad Bin Hassan is a Malaysian politician who served as the Member of Parliament (MP) for Papar from May 2018 to November 2022. He is also a member, Member of the Supreme Council and Division Chief of Papar of the Heritage Party (WARISAN). He is a member of the Association of Southeast Asian Nations Inter-Parliamentary Assembly (ASEAN IPA or AIPA) and a member of the Public Accounts Committee (PAC).

== Elections ==
=== 2018 general election ===
In the 2018 election, his party of Sabah Heritage Party (WARISAN) field him to contest the Papar parliamentary seat, facing the seat defending candidate Rosnah Shirlin from the United Malays National Organisation (UMNO) and subsequently won.

== Election results ==
Parliament of Malaysia
Year	Constituency	Candidate	Votes	Pct	Opponent(s)	Votes	Pct	Ballots cast	Majority	Turnout
2018	P175 Papar	Ahmad Hassan (WARISAN)	17,394	48.54%	Rosnah Shirlin (UMNO)	17,069	47.63%	36,540	325	83.83%
2018	P175 Papar	Ahmad Hassan (WARISAN)	17,394	48.54%	Jamil William Core (STAR)	892	2.49%	36,540	325	83.83%
2018	P175 Papar	Ahmad Hassan (WARISAN)	17,394	48.54%	Elbert Sikuil (PCS)	481	1.34%	36,540	325	83.83%
2022	P175 Papar	Ahmad Hassan (WARISAN)	10,396	23.89%	Armizan Mohd Ali (Sabah BERSATU)	22,620	51.99%	44,295	12,224	72.59%
2022	P175 Papar	Ahmad Hassan (WARISAN)	10,396	23.89%	Henry Shim Chee On (DAP)	9,144	21.02%	44,295	12,224	72.59%
2022	P175 Papar	Ahmad Hassan (WARISAN)	10,396	23.89%	Nicholas Sylvester @ Berry (PEJUANG)	783	1.80%	44,295	12,224	72.59%
2022	P175 Papar	Ahmad Hassan (WARISAN)	10,396	23.89%	Johnny Sitamin (IND)	335	0.77%	44,295	12,224	72.59%
2022	P175 Papar	Ahmad Hassan (WARISAN)	10,396	23.89%	Norbert Chin Chuan Siong (IND)	231	0.53%	44,295	12,224	72.59%
