= Kemena =

Kemena (N69)
Sarawak constituency

State constituency
- Legislature: Sarawak State Legislative Assembly
MLA
Vacant
- Constituency created: 1968
- First contested: 1969
- Last contested: 2026

Kemena is a state constituency in Sarawak, Malaysia, that has been represented in the Sarawak State Legislative Assembly since 1969. It was created in the 1968 redistribution and is mandated to return a single member to the assembly under its first-past-the-post voting system.

== Demographics ==
Ethnic breakdown of Kemena's electorate as of 2022
1. Sarawak bumiputera (89.4%)
2. Malay-Muslim bumiputera (6.20%)
3. Chinese (3.60%)
4. Other ethnicities (0.80%)

== History ==
As of 2020, Kemena has a population of 47,149 people.

=== Polling districts ===
According to the gazette issued on 31 October 2022, the Kemena constituency has a total of 9 polling districts.

State constituency	Polling Districts	Code	Location
Kemena (N69)	Sebauh	217/69/01	RH Lapi Sg. Binai; SK Sebauh; SJK (C) Chung San Sebauh
Kemena (N69)	Labang	217/69/02	RH Ro Teban Baru; SK Sg. Segian; Balai Raya Kampung Labang; SK Pandan
Kemena (N69)	Hulu Suai	217/69/03	SK Batu Telinggai
Kemena (N69)	Sekaloh	217/69/04	SK Sg. Manong Niah
Kemena (N69)	Sungai Sebauh	217/69/05	RH Jimbai Sg. Gerong; RH Tabor Ak Lasah Sg Sebauh; RH Raymohd Plen Sg Gelam
Kemena (N69)	Sebungan	217/69/06	RH Robert Sg. Sebungan; RH Augustine Lamau; RH Jenang Sg. Gusi Kelabat; RH Nompang Sg. Sujan
Kemena (N69)	Pandan	217/69/07	SK Kuala Sigu; RH Nicholas Sandum Sg Sigu; SK Kuala Binyo; RH Nyipa Ajong Sg. Binyo; SK Bukit Mawang; SK Sg. Genaan
Kemena (N69)	Goyang	217/69/08	SK Goyang
Kemena (N69)	Subis Satu	217/69/09	SK Sg. Lamus Niah

=== Representation ===
Members of the Legislative Assembly for Kemena
Assembly	No	Years	Member	Party
Constituency created
8th	N42	1970-1973	Abok Jalin	PESAKA
9th	N42	1974-1979	Celestine Ujang Jilan	BN (PBB)
10th	N42	1979-1983	Celestine Ujang Jilan	BN (PBB)
11th	N42	1983-1987	Celestine Ujang Jilan	BN (PBB)
12th	N42	1987-1991	Celestine Ujang Jilan	BN (PBB)
13th	N49	1991-1996	Celestine Ujang Jilan	BN (PBB)
14th	N52	1996-2001	Celestine Ujang Jilan	BN (PBB)
15th	N52	2001-2006	Stephen Rundi Utom	BN (PBB)
16th	N60	2006-2011	Stephen Rundi Utom	BN (PBB)
17th	N60	2011-2016	Stephen Rundi Utom	BN (PBB)
18th	N69	2016-2018	Stephen Rundi Utom	BN (PBB)
18th	N69	2018-2021	Stephen Rundi Utom	GPS (PBB)
19th	N69	2021–2026	Stephen Rundi Utom	GPS (PBB)

== Election results ==
Sarawak state election, 2026: Kemena
Party	Candidate	Votes	%	∆%
GPS				▲
PH				▲
Total valid votes				
Total rejected ballots				
Unreturned ballots				
Turnout				
Registered electors				
Majority				

Sarawak state election, 2021: Kemena
Party	Candidate	Votes	%	∆%
GPS	Stephen Rundi Utom	6,339	62.82	▲62.82
PSB	Bernard Tahim Bael	2,728	27.03	▲27.03
DAP	John Brian Anthony Jeremy Guang	399	3.95	▼20.47
Independent	Jame Stephen Randi Sekalai	331	3.28	▲3.28
PBK	Chelea Vanessa William	294	2.91	▲2.91
Total valid votes		10,091	100.00	
Total rejected ballots		143		
Unreturned ballots		21		
Turnout		10,255	71.95	▼2.67
Registered electors		14,252		
Majority		3,611	35.79	▼15.37
GPS gain from BN		Swing		?
Source(s) https://lom.agc.gov.my/ilims/upload/portal/akta/outputp/1718688/PUB687.pdf

Sarawak state election, 2016: Kemena
Party	Candidate	Votes	%	∆%
BN	Stephen Rundi Utom	7,192	75.58	▲11.06
DAP	Leighton Manjah	2,324	24.42	▲24.42
Total valid votes		9,516	100.00	
Total rejected ballots		175		
Unreturned ballots		3		
Turnout		9,694	74.62	▲3.33
Registered electors		12,991		
Majority		4,868	51.16	▲17.23
BN hold		Swing		
Source(s) "Federal Government Gazette - Notice of Contested Election, State Legislative Assembly of the State of Sarawak [P.U. (B) 190/2016]" (PDF). Attorney General's Chambers of Malaysia. 25 April 2016. Archived from the original (PDF) on 2017-06-12. "Senarai Calon yang Disahkan Layak Bertanding Pilihan Raya Dewan Undangan Negeri ke-11". Election Commission of Malaysia. 25 April 2016. Archived from the original on 25 April 2016.

Sarawak state election, 2011: Kemena
Party	Candidate	Votes	%	∆%
BN	Stephen Rundi Utom	6,369	64.52	▲4.61
PKR	Bernard Binar Bayang Rading	3,020	30.59	▲30.59
SNAP	Ungun Bayang	285	2.89	▼37.20
Independent	Liam Rengga	197	2.00	▲2.00
Total valid votes		9,871	100.00	
Total rejected ballots		162		
Unreturned ballots		6		
Turnout		10,039	71.29	▲10.92
Registered electors		14,082		
Majority		3,349	33.92	▲14.09
BN hold		Swing		
Source(s) "Federal Government Gazette - Results of Contested Election and Statements of the Poll after the Official Addition of Votes Sarawak [P.U. (B) 245/2011]" (PDF). Attorney General's Chambers of Malaysia. 29 April 2011.

Sarawak state election, 2006: Kemena
Party	Candidate	Votes	%	∆%
BN	Stephen Rundi Utom	4,750	59.91	▼19.21
SNAP	John Brian Anthony Jeremy Guang	3,178	40.09	▲40.09
Total valid votes		7,928	100.00	
Total rejected ballots		124		
Unreturned ballots		1		
Turnout		8,053	60.37	▼3.78
Registered electors		13,338		
Majority		1,572	19.83	▼47.75
BN hold		Swing		?

Sarawak state election, 2001: Kemena
Party	Candidate	Votes	%	∆%
BN	Stephen Rundi Utom	6,830	79.12	▼3.50
DAP	David Kimay	998	11.56	▼5.82
Independent	John Brian Anthony Jeremy Guang	716	8.29	▲8.29
Independent	Edward Galau Sigi	88	1.02	▲1.02
Total valid votes		8,632	100.00	
Total rejected ballots		132		
Unreturned ballots		0		
Turnout		8,764	64.15	▼3.02
Registered electors		13,665		
Majority		5,832	67.56	▲2.32
BN hold		Swing		?

Sarawak state by-election, 24–25 May 1997: Kemena Upon election declared null and void
Party	Candidate	Votes	%	∆%
BN	Celestine Ujang Jilan	6,928	82.62	
DAP	Chiew Chiu Sing	1,457	17.38	
Total valid votes		8,385	100.00	
Total rejected ballots		176		
Unreturned ballots		0		
Turnout		8,561	67.17	▼0.32
Registered electors		12,746		
Majority		5,471	65.24	▲26.12
BN hold		Swing		?

Sarawak state election, 1996: Kemena
Party	Candidate	Votes	%	∆%
On the nomination day, Celestine Ujang Jilan won uncontested.
BN	Celestine Ujang Jilan			
Total valid votes			100.00	
Total rejected ballots				
Unreturned ballots				
Turnout				
Registered electors		12,739		
Majority				
BN hold		Swing		?

Sarawak state election, 1991: Kemena
Party	Candidate	Votes	%	∆%
BN	Celestine Ujang Jilan	5,050	67.00	▲18.84
PBDS	Stephen Randi Sekalai	2,101	27.89	▼5.94
DAP	Hussen Abd Razak	277	3.68	▼14.33
NEGARA	Anthony Nait Mani	109	1.45	▲1.45
Total valid votes		7,537	100.00	
Total rejected ballots		96		
Unreturned ballots		0		
Turnout		7,633	67.49	▼0.39
Registered electors		11,310		
Majority		2,949	39.13	▲24.80
BN hold		Swing		?

Sarawak state election, 1987: Kemena
Party	Candidate	Votes	%	∆%
BN	Celestine Ujang Jilan	6,581	48.16	▼17.78
PERMAS	Victor Temenggong Angang	4,623	33.83	▲33.83
DAP	Chiew Chiu Sing	2,462	18.01	▲18.01
Total valid votes		13,666	100.00	
Total rejected ballots		137		
Unreturned ballots		0		
Turnout		13,803	67.88	▲0.99
Registered electors		20,333		
Majority		1,958	14.33	▼22.83
BN hold		Swing		?

Sarawak state election, 1983: Kemena
Party	Candidate	Votes	%	∆%
BN	Celestine Ujang Jilan	6,703	65.94	▼21.60
DAP	Philip Chan Hwa Tat	2,926	28.79	▲28.79
Independent	Mohamad Nawi	536	5.27	▲5.27
Total valid votes		10,165	100.00	
Total rejected ballots		290		
Unreturned ballots		0		
Turnout		10,455	66.89	▲6.39
Registered electors		15,629		
Majority		3,777	37.16	▼37.93
BN hold		Swing		?

Sarawak state election, 1979: Kemena
Party	Candidate	Votes	%	∆%
BN	Celestine Ujang Jilan	6,001	87.54	▲28.79
Parti Anak Jati Sarawak	Mohamad Nawi	854	12.46	▲12.46
Total valid votes		6,855	100.00	
Total rejected ballots		340		
Unreturned ballots		0		
Turnout		7,195	60.50	▼12.30
Registered electors		11,896		
Majority		5,147	75.09	▲69.58
BN hold		Swing		?

Sarawak state election, 1974: Kemena
Party	Candidate	Votes	%	∆%
BN	Celestine Ujang Jilan	2,429	46.31	▲46.31
SNAP	Baran Nalo	2,140	40.80	▲40.80
Independent	Mohamed Julaihi Mohamed Hanafie	676	12.89	▲12.89
Total valid votes		5,245	100.00	
Total rejected ballots		548		
Unreturned ballots		0		
Turnout		5,793	72.80	▲1.81
Registered electors		7,961		
Majority		289	5.51	▲0.66
BN gain from PESAKA		Swing		?

Sarawak state election, 1969: Kemena
Party	Candidate	Votes	%
PESAKA	Abok Jalin	1,366	31.40
PBB	Asghar Khan	1,155	26.55
SNAP	Ting Lian Tung	884	20.32
SUPP	Png Tai Yok	733	16.85
Independent	Medan Suhang	212	4.87
Total valid votes		4,350	100.00
Total rejected ballots		349	
Unreturned ballots		0	
Turnout		4,699	70.99
Registered electors		6,619	
Majority		211	4.85
This was a new constituency created.
