= Minister of Domestic Trade and Costs of Living (Malaysia) =

Government minister of Malaysia

- Menteri Perdagangan Dalam Negeri dan Kos Sara Hidup

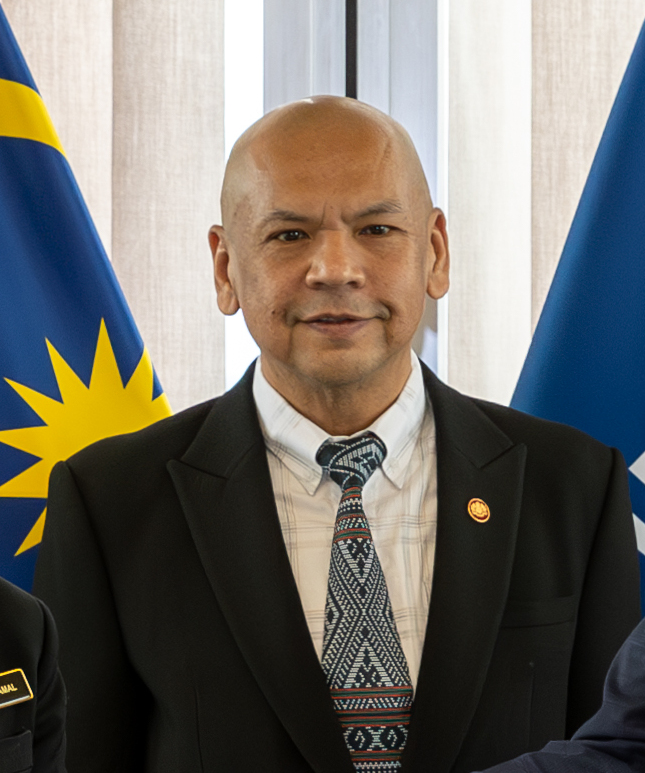
- Incumbent; Armizan Mohd Ali since 30 July 2023
- Ministry of Domestic Trade and Costs of Living
- Style: Yang Berhormat Menteri (The Honourable Minister)
- Abbreviation: KPDN
- Member of: Cabinet of Malaysia
- Reports to: Parliament of Malaysia
- Seat: Putrajaya
- Appointer: Yang di-Pertuan Agong on the recommendation of the Prime Minister of Malaysia
- Formation: 1990
- First holder: Sulaiman Daud (Minister of Domestic Trade and Consumer Affairs)
- Deputy: Fuziah Salleh
- Website: www.kpdn.gov.my

The current Malaysian Minister of Domestic Trade and Costs of Living has been Armizan Mohd Ali since 30 July 2023. The minister has been supported by Deputy Minister of Domestic Trade and Costs of Living Fuziah Salleh since 10 December 2022. The minister administers the portfolio through the Ministry of Domestic Trade and Costs of Living.

== List of ministers ==
=== Domestic trade ===
The following individuals have been appointed as Minister of Trade, or any of its precedent titles:

Political party: Alliance/BN PH GPS GRS

Portrait	Name (Birth–Death) Constituency	Political party	Title	Took office	Left office	Deputy Minister	Prime Minister (Cabinet)
	Sulaiman Daud (1933–2010); MP for Petra Jaya	BN (PBB)	Minister of Domestic Trade and Consumer Affairs	27 October 1990	15 March 1991	Abdul Kadir Sheikh Fadzir	Mahathir Mohamad (IV)
	Abu Hassan Omar (1940–2018); MP for Kuala Selangor	BN (UMNO)	Minister of Domestic Trade and Consumer Affairs	15 March 1991	1 May 1997	Abdul Kadir Sheikh Fadzir (1991–1995); Subramaniam Sinniah (1995–1999)	Mahathir Mohamad (IV • V)
	Megat Junid Megat Ayub (1942–2008); MP for Pasir Salak	BN (UMNO)	Minister of Domestic Trade and Consumer Affairs	2 March 1997	14 December 1999	Subramaniam Sinniah	Mahathir Mohamad (V)
	Muhyiddin Yassin (b. 1947); MP for Pagoh	BN (UMNO)	Minister of Domestic Trade and Consumer Affairs	15 December 1999	26 March 2004	Subramaniam Sinniah	Mahathir Mohamad (VI); Abdullah Ahmad Badawi (I)
	Shafie Apdal (b. 1956); MP for Semporna	BN (UMNO)	Minister of Domestic Trade and Consumer Affairs	27 March 2004	18 March 2008	S. Veerasingam	Abdullah Ahmad Badawi (II)
	Shahrir Abdul Samad (b. 1949); MP for Johor Bahru	BN (UMNO)	Minister of Domestic Trade and Consumer Affairs	19 March 2008	9 April 2009	Jelaing Mersat	Abdullah Ahmad Badawi (III)
	Ismail Sabri Yaakob (b. 1960); MP for Bera	BN (UMNO)	Minister of Domestic Trade, Co-operatives and Consumerism	10 April 2009	15 May 2013	Tan Lian Hoe (2009–2013); Rohani Abdul Karim (2010–2013)	Najib Razak (I)
	Hasan Malek (b. 1946); MP for Kuala Pilah	BN (UMNO)	Minister of Domestic Trade, Co-operatives and Consumerism	16 May 2013	29 July 2015	Ahmad Bashah Md. Hanipah	Najib Razak (II)
	Hamzah Zainudin (b. 1957); MP for Larut	BN (UMNO)	Minister of Domestic Trade, Co-operatives and Consumerism	29 July 2015	9 May 2018	Ahmad Bashah Md. Hanipah (2015–2016); Henry Sum Agong (2016–2018)	Najib Razak (II)
	Saifuddin Nasution Ismail (b. 1963); MP for Kulim-Bandar Baharu	PH (PKR)	Minister of Domestic Trade and Consumer Affairs	2 July 2018	24 February 2020	Chong Chieng Jen	Mahathir Mohamad (VII)
	Alexander Nanta Linggi (b. 1958); MP for Kapit	GPS (PBB)	Minister of Domestic Trade and Consumer Affairs	10 March 2020	24 November 2022	Rosol Wahid	Muhyiddin Yassin (I); Ismail Sabri Yaakob (I)
	Salahuddin Ayub (1961–2023); MP for Pulai	PH (AMANAH)	Minister of Domestic Trade and Living Costs	3 December 2022	23 July 2023	Fuziah Salleh	Anwar Ibrahim (I)
	Armizan Mohd Ali (b. 1976); MP for Papar	GRS (Direct member)	Acting Minister of Domestic Trade and Living Costs	30 July 2023	12 December 2023	Fuziah Salleh	Anwar Ibrahim (I)
	Armizan Mohd Ali (b. 1976); MP for Papar	GRS (Direct member)	Minister of Domestic Trade and Living Costs	12 December 2023	Incumbent	Fuziah Salleh	Anwar Ibrahim (I)

=== Costs of living ===
The following individuals have been appointed as Minister of Costs of Living, or any of its precedent titles:

Political party: PH GRS

Portrait	Name (Birth–Death) Constituency	Political party	Title	Took office	Left office	Deputy Minister	Prime Minister (Cabinet)
	Salahuddin Ayub (1961–2023); MP for Pulai	PH (AMANAH)	Minister of Domestic Trade and Living Costs	3 December 2022	23 July 2023	Fuziah Salleh	Anwar Ibrahim (I)
	Armizan Mohd Ali (b. 1976); MP for Papar	GRS (Direct member)	Acting Minister of Domestic Trade and Living Costs	30 July 2023	12 December 2023	Fuziah Salleh	Anwar Ibrahim (I)
	Armizan Mohd Ali (b. 1976); MP for Papar	GRS (Direct member)	Minister of Domestic Trade and Living Costs	12 December 2023	Incumbent	Fuziah Salleh	Anwar Ibrahim (I)

=== Consumer affairs ===
The following individuals have been appointed as Minister of Consumer Affairs, or any of its precedent titles:

Political party: BN PH GPS

Portrait	Name (Birth–Death) Constituency	Political party	Title	Took office	Left office	Deputy Minister	Prime Minister (Cabinet)
	Sulaiman Daud (1933–2010); MP for Petra Jaya	BN (PBB)	Minister of Domestic Trade and Consumer Affairs	27 October 1990	15 March 1991	Abdul Kadir Sheikh Fadzir	Mahathir Mohamad (IV)
	Abu Hassan Omar (1940–2018); MP for Kuala Selangor	BN (UMNO)	Minister of Domestic Trade and Consumer Affairs	15 March 1991	1 May 1997	Abdul Kadir Sheikh Fadzir (1991–1995); Subramaniam Sinniah (1995–1999)	Mahathir Mohamad (IV • V)
	Megat Junid Megat Ayub (1942–2008); MP for Pasir Salak	BN (UMNO)	Minister of Domestic Trade and Consumer Affairs	2 March 1997	14 December 1999	Subramaniam Sinniah	Mahathir Mohamad (V)
	Muhyiddin Yassin (b. 1947); MP for Pagoh	BN (UMNO)	Minister of Domestic Trade and Consumer Affairs	15 December 1999	26 March 2004	Subramaniam Sinniah	Mahathir Mohamad (VI); Abdullah Ahmad Badawi (I)
	Shafie Apdal (b. 1957); MP for Semporna	BN (UMNO)	Minister of Domestic Trade and Consumer Affairs	27 March 2004	18 March 2008	S. Veerasingam	Abdullah Ahmad Badawi (II)
	Shahrir Abdul Samad (b. 1949); MP for Johor Bahru	BN (UMNO)	Minister of Domestic Trade and Consumer Affairs	19 March 2008	9 April 2009	Jelaing Mersat	Abdullah Ahmad Badawi (III)
	Ismail Sabri Yaakob (b. 1960); MP for Bera	BN (UMNO)	Minister of Domestic Trade, Co-operatives and Consumerism	10 April 2009	15 May 2013	Tan Lian Hoe (2009–2013); Rohani Abdul Karim (2010–2013)	Najib Razak (I)
	Hasan Malek (b. 1946); MP for Kuala Pilah	BN (UMNO)	Minister of Domestic Trade, Co-operatives and Consumerism	16 May 2013	29 July 2015	Ahmad Bashah Md. Hanipah	Najib Razak (II)
	Hamzah Zainudin (b. 1957); MP for Larut	BN (UMNO)	Minister of Domestic Trade, Co-operatives and Consumerism	29 July 2015	9 May 2018	Ahmad Bashah Md. Hanipah (2015–2016); Henry Sum Agong (2016–2018)	Najib Razak (II)
	Saifuddin Nasution Ismail (b. 1963); MP for Kulim-Bandar Baharu	PH (PKR)	Minister of Domestic Trade and Consumer Affairs	2 July 2018	24 February 2020	Chong Chieng Jen	Mahathir Mohamad (VII)
	Alexander Nanta Linggi (b. 1958); MP for Kapit	GPS (PBB)	Minister of Domestic Trade and Consumer Affairs	10 March 2020	24 November 2022	Rosol Wahid	Muhyiddin Yassin (I); Ismail Sabri Yaakob (I)
