= Armizan Mohd Ali =

Malaysian politician (born 1976)

Yang Berhormat Datuk Armizan Mohd Ali PGDK DIMP ADK JP MP
- أرميزان محمّد علي
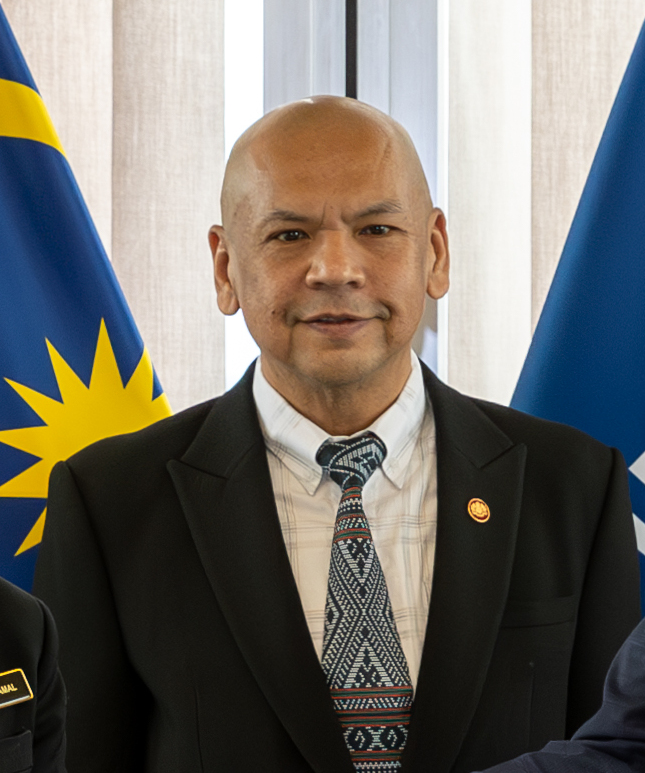
- Armizan Mohd Ali in 2024

Minister of Domestic Trade and Costs of Living
- Incumbent
- Assumed office 30 July 2023; Acting: 30 July 2023 to 12 December 2023
- Monarchs: Abdullah (2023–2024); Ibrahim Iskandar (since 2024)
- Prime Minister: Anwar Ibrahim
- Deputy: Fuziah Salleh
- Preceded by: Salahuddin Ayub
- Constituency: Papar

Minister in the Prime Minister's Department (Sabah, Sarawak Affairs and Special Functions)
- In office 3 December 2022 – 12 December 2023
- Monarch: Abdullah
- Prime Minister: Anwar Ibrahim
- Deputy: Wilson Ugak Kumbong
- Preceded by: Maximus Ongkili (Sabah and Sarawak Affairs); Abdul Latiff Ahmad (Special Functions)
- Succeeded by: Position abolished Fadillah Yusof (Minister-in-charge of Sabah and Sarawak Affairs); Mustapha Sakmud (Minister in the Prime Minister's Department (Sabah and Sarawak))
- Constituency: Papar

Member of the Malaysian Parliament for Papar
- Incumbent
- Assumed office 19 November 2022
- Preceded by: Ahmad Hassan (WARISAN)
- Majority: 12,224 (2022)

Personal details
- Born: Armizan bin Mohd Ali; 9 September 1976 (age 49) Kampung Pengalat Besar, Papar, Sabah, Malaysia
- Party: United Malays National Organisation of Sabah (Sabah UMNO) (until 2019); Malaysian United Indigenous Party of Sabah (Sabah BERSATU) (2019–2022); Gabungan Rakyat Sabah Direct Member (GRS) (since 2022)
- Other political affiliations: Barisan Nasional (BN) (until 2019); Pakatan Harapan (PH) (2019–2020); Perikatan Nasional (PN) (2020–2022); Gabungan Rakyat Sabah (GRS) (since 2020)
- Education: International Islamic University Malaysia (LLB); Universiti Malaysia Sabah (MA)

Armizan bin Mohd Ali (Jawi: أرميزان بن محمد علي; born 9 September 1976) is a Malaysian politician who has served as the Head of the Organizational Body of the Gabungan Rakyat Sabah Direct Members faction (or known simply as DM-GRS), also served as Gabungan Rakyat Sabah (GRS) deputy secretary-general as well as the founder and manager of the Gabungan Rakyat Sabah Student Wing (GRSSW) who was appointed in 2022. He has served as the Minister of Domestic Trade and Costs of Living in the Unity Government administration under Prime Minister Anwar Ibrahim since July 2023. He served in the position in acting capacity from July to December 2023. He has also served as the Member of Parliament (MP) for Papar since November 2022. He served as the Minister in the Prime Minister's Department in charge of Sabah, Sarawak Affairs and Special Functions in the PH administration under Prime Minister Anwar from December 2022 to December 2023. He is a direct member of the Gabungan Rakyat Sabah (GRS) and was a member of the Malaysian United Indigenous Party of Sabah (Sabah BERSATU), branch of a component party of the GRS and formerly Perikatan Nasional (PN) coalitions. He was also a member of the United Malays National Organisation of Sabah (Sabah UMNO), branch of a component party of the Barisan Nasional (BN) coalition.

== Election results ==
Parliament of Malaysia
Year	Constituency	Candidate	Votes	Pct	Opponent(s)	Votes	Pct	Ballots cast	Majority	Turnout
2022	P175 Papar	Armizan Mohd Ali (Sabah BERSATU)	22,620	51.99%	Ahmad Hassan (WARISAN)	10,396	23.89%	44,295	12,224	72.59%
2022	P175 Papar	Armizan Mohd Ali (Sabah BERSATU)	22,620	51.99%	Henry Shim Chee On (DAP)	9,144	21.02%	44,295	12,224	72.59%
2022	P175 Papar	Armizan Mohd Ali (Sabah BERSATU)	22,620	51.99%	Nicholas Sylvester @ Berry (PEJUANG)	783	1.80%	44,295	12,224	72.59%
2022	P175 Papar	Armizan Mohd Ali (Sabah BERSATU)	22,620	51.99%	Johnny Sitamin (IND)	335	0.77%	44,295	12,224	72.59%
2022	P175 Papar	Armizan Mohd Ali (Sabah BERSATU)	22,620	51.99%	Norbert Chin Chuan Siong (IND)	231	0.53%	44,295	12,224	72.59%

== Honours ==
=== Honours of Malaysia ===
- Malaysia
  - Recipient of the 17th Yang di-Pertuan Agong Installation Medal
- Pahang
  - Knight Companion of the Order of the Crown of Pahang (DIMP) – Dato' (2016)
- Sabah
  - Commander of the Order of Kinabalu (PGDK) – Datuk (2022)
  - Member of the Order of Kinabalu (ADK) (2007)
  - Justice of the Peace (JP) (2010)
