= Martin Ben =

Malaysian politician

Yang Berhormat Datuk Martin Ben MLA PGBK KMN
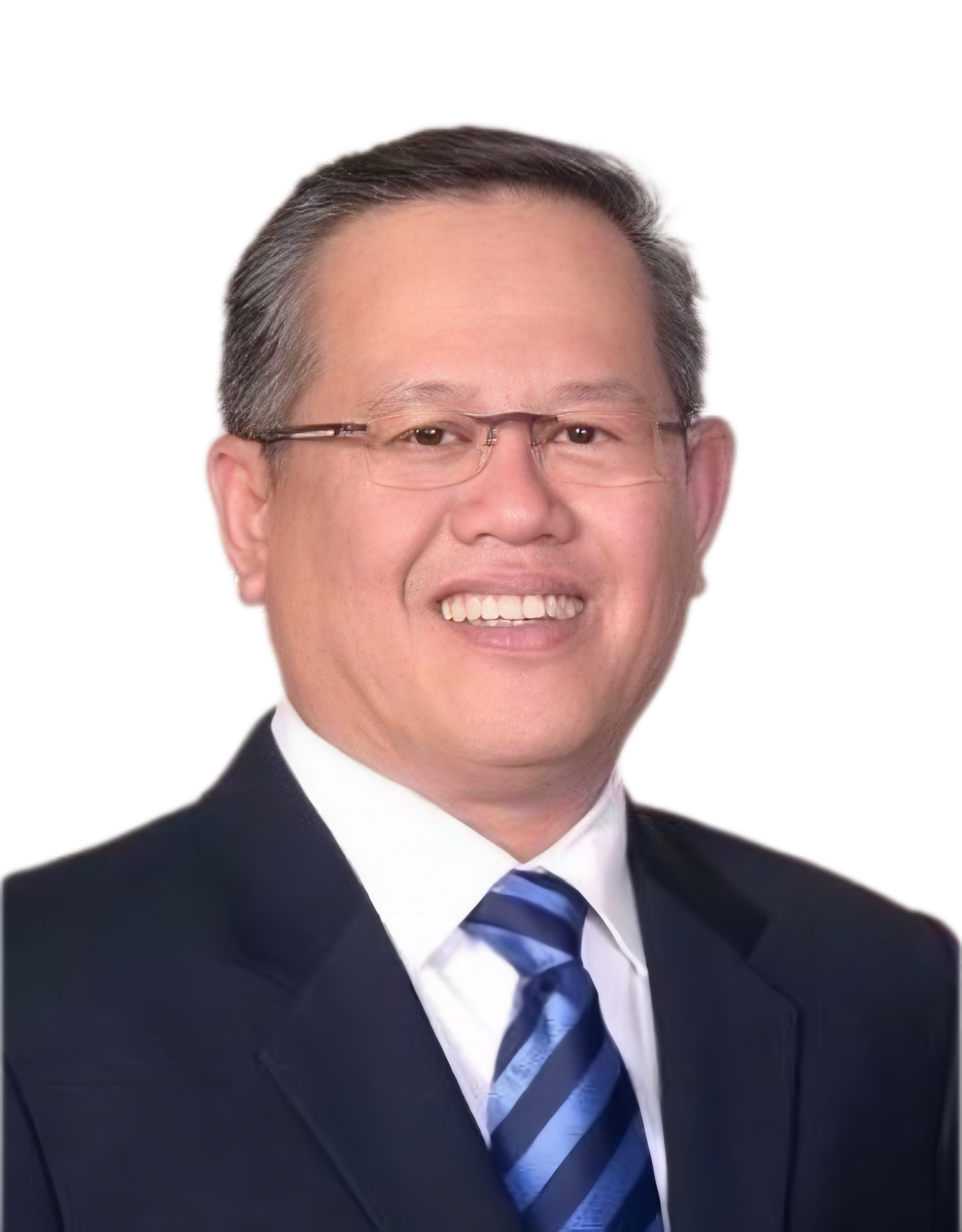

Deputy Minister for Modernisation of Agriculture and Regional Development
- Incumbent
- Assumed office 2022 Serving with Abdul Rahman Ismail
- Governor: Abdul Taib Mahmud (2022-2024); Wan Junaidi Tuanku Jaafar (since 2024)
- Premier: Abang Johari
- Preceded by: Position established

Member of the Sarawak State Legislative Assembly for Kedup
- Incumbent
- Assumed office 2011
- Preceded by: Frederick Bayoi Manggie

Personal details
- Born: Martin Ben Sarawak
- Citizenship: Malaysian
- Party: PBB
- Other political affiliations: Barisan Nasional (till 2018); Gabungan Parti Sarawak (since 2018)
- Spouse: Chiam Sueh Li
- Occupation: Politician

Maclaine @ Martin Ben is a Malaysian politician from PBB. He has served as the Member of the Sarawak State Legislative Assembly for Kedup since 2011. He is also the Deputy Minister for Modernisation of Agriculture and Regional Development in Sarawak.

== Political career ==
Martin has served as the Chief of Youth Wing of PBB since 2025.

== Election results ==
Sarawak State Legislative Assembly
Year	Constituency	Candidate	Votes	Pct.	Opponent(s)	Votes	Pct.	Ballots cast	Majority	Turnout
2011	N19 Kedup	Martin Ben (PBB)	6,476	55.11%	Lainus Andrew Luwak (PKR)	4,211	35.84%	12,128	2,265	69.44%
2011	N19 Kedup	Martin Ben (PBB)	6,476	55.11%	Sylvester Belayong Jayang (SNAP)	666	5.67%	12,128	2,265	69.44%
2011	N19 Kedup	Martin Ben (PBB)	6,476	55.11%	Amin Banti (IND)	397	3.38%	12,128	2,265	69.44%
2016	N22 Kedup	Martin Ben (PBB)	5,769	73.23%	Andrew Nyabe (DAP)	1,941	24.64%	8,000	3,828	77.15%
2016	N22 Kedup	Martin Ben (PBB)	5,769	73.23%	Mark Murau Sumon (PBDS Baru)	168	2.13%	8,000	3,828	77.15%
2021	N22 Kedup	Martin Ben (PBB)	5,178	63.34%	Dominic Dado Sagin (PSB)	1,612	19.72%	8,323	3,566	74.30%
2021	N22 Kedup	Martin Ben (PBB)	5,178	63.34%	Stephen Morgan Sungan (PBK)	745	9.11%	8,323	3,566	74.30%
2021	N22 Kedup	Martin Ben (PBB)	5,178	63.34%	Learry Jabul (DAP)	640	7.83%	8,323	3,566	74.30%

== Honours ==
- Malaysia :
  - Officer of the Order of the Defender of the Realm (KMN) (2016)
- Sarawak :
  - Commander of the Order of the Star of Hornbill Sarawak (PGBK) – Datuk (2023)
