= Abdul Rahman Ismail (Sarawak politician) =

Malaysian politician

Yang Berhormat Datuk Haji Abdul Rahman Ismail MLA PGBK
- عبدالرحمن إسماعيل

Deputy Minister for Modernisation of Agriculture and Regional Development
- Incumbent
- Assumed office 2022 Serving with Martin Ben
- Governor: Abdul Taib Mahmud (2022-2024); Wan Junaidi Tuanku Jaafar (since 2024)
- Premier: Abang Johari
- Preceded by: Position established

Member of the Sarawak State Legislative Assembly for Bukit Kota
- Incumbent
- Assumed office 2006
- Preceded by: Constituency created

Personal details
- Born: Abdul Rahman bin Ismail Sarawak
- Citizenship: Malaysian
- Party: PBB
- Other political affiliations: Barisan Nasional (till 2018); Gabungan Parti Sarawak (since 2018)
- Occupation: Politician

Abdul Rahman bin Ismail is a Malaysian politician from PBB. He has served as the Member of the Sarawak State Legislative Assembly for Bukit Kota since 2006. He is also the Deputy Minister for Modernisation of Agriculture and Regional Development in Sarawak.

== Election results ==
Sarawak State Legislative Assembly
Year	Constituency	Candidate	Votes	Pct.	Opponent(s)	Votes	Pct.	Ballots cast	Majority	Turnout
2006	N68 Bukit Kota	Abdul Rahman Ismail (PBB)	5,501	70.48%	Said Mohidin (IND)	2,272	29.11%	7,890	3,229	59.19%
2006	N68 Bukit Kota	Abdul Rahman Ismail (PBB)	5,501	70.48%	Ali Abdullah (IND)	32	0.41%	7,890	3,229	59.19%
2011	N68 Bukit Kota	Abdul Rahman Ismail (PBB)	6,835	73.02%	Leong Kwang Yew (DAP)	1,774	18.95%	9,470	5,061	65.44%
2011	N68 Bukit Kota	Abdul Rahman Ismail (PBB)	6,835	73.02%	Usop Jidin (IND)	398	4.25%	9,470	5,061	65.44%
2011	N68 Bukit Kota	Abdul Rahman Ismail (PBB)	6,835	73.02%	Ladis Pandin (IND)	353	3.78%	9,470	5,061	65.44%
2016	N79 Bukit Kota	Abdul Rahman Ismail (PBB)	Unopposed							
2021	N79 Bukit Kota	Abdul Rahman Ismail (PBB)	6,454	78.80%	Rosli Amat (PSB)	1,468	17.92%	8,313	4,986	46.97%
2021	N79 Bukit Kota	Abdul Rahman Ismail (PBB)	6,454	78.80%	Lim Lian Hun (PBK)	206	2.52%	8,313	4,986	46.97%
2021	N79 Bukit Kota	Abdul Rahman Ismail (PBB)	6,454	78.80%	Herun Bungsu (IND)	62	0.76%	8,313	4,986	46.97%

== Honours ==
- Sarawak :
  - Commander of the Order of the Star of Hornbill Sarawak (PGBK) – Datuk (2019)
