= Papar (federal constituency) =

Federal constituency of Sabah, Malaysia

Papar (P175)
Sabah constituency

Federal constituency
- Legislature: Dewan Rakyat
- MP: Armizan Mohd Ali; GRS
- Constituency created: 1984
- First contested: 1986
- Last contested: 2022

Demographics
- Population (2020): 106,765
- Electors (2025): 64,074
- Area (km²): 610
- Pop. density (per km²): 175

Papar is a federal constituency in West Coast Division (Papar District), Sabah, Malaysia, that has been represented in the Dewan Rakyat since 1986.

The federal constituency was created in the 1984 redistribution and is mandated to return a single member to the Dewan Rakyat under the first past the post voting system.

== Demographics ==
https://ge15.orientaldaily.com.my/seats/sabah/p

Ethnic breakdown of Papar's electorate as of 2022
1. Sabah Bumiputera 62.1 (60.9%)
2. Malay-Muslim Bumiputera 24 (23.5%)
3. Chinese 8.7 (8.53%)
4. Other ethnicities 7.2 (7.06%)

As of 2020, Papar has a population of 106,765 people.

Age breakdown of Papar's electorate as of 2022
1. 18-20 (7.61%)
2. 21-29 (22.1%)
3. 30-39 (21.8%)
4. 40-49 (18.1%)
5. 50-59 (14.7%)
6. 60-69 (9.89%)
7. 70-79 (4.03%)
8. 80-89 (1.28%)
9. above 90 (0.58%)
Gender breakdown of Papar's electorate as of 2022
1. Male (49.9%)
2. Female (50.1%)

== History ==
=== Polling districts ===
According to the gazette issued on 21 November 2025, the Papar constituency has a total of 20 polling districts.

State constituency	Polling Districts	Code	Location
Limbahau（N27）	Dambai	175/27/01	SK Limputong; SA Negeri Buang Sayang Papar
Limbahau（N27）	Labak	175/27/02	SK Tampasak
Limbahau（N27）	Kaiduan	175/27/03	SK Kaiduan
Limbahau（N27）	Gana	175/27/04	SK Gana; SK Tanaki
Limbahau（N27）	Ovai	175/27/05	SK Kogopon
Limbahau（N27）	Surati	175/27/06	SK Surati
Limbahau（N27）	Limbahau	175/27/07	SMK St. Mary Papar
Limbahau（N27）	Biau	175/27/08	SK Sabandil; SK Padawan Besar
Limbahau（N27）	Rampazan	175/27/09	SK Rampazan
Kawang（N28）	Pengalat	175/28/01	SMK Pengalat Papar
Kawang（N28）	Kawang	175/28/02	SK Kawang
Kawang（N28）	Kinarut	175/28/03	SK Pekan Kinarut; SMA Tun Datu Mustapha
Kawang（N28）	Kampung Laut	175/28/04	SMK Kinarut
Kawang（N28）	Pengalat Kecil	175/28/05	SMK Pengalat Papar
Kawang（N28）	Beringgis	175/28/06	SK Beringgis
Pantai Manis（N29）	Buang Sayang	175/29/01	SK Buang Sayang
Pantai Manis（N29）	Kuala	175/29/02	Jabatan Pembangunan Sumber Manusia (ILTP) Papar; SK Pantai Manis Papar
Pantai Manis（N29）	Kelanahan	175/29/03	SMK Takis
Pantai Manis（N29）	Bandar Papar	175/29/04	SMK Majakir
Pantai Manis（N29）	Benoni	175/29/05	SK Benoni

=== Representation history ===
Members of Parliament for Papar
Parliament	No	Years	Member	Party
Constituency created from Kimanis and Penampang
7th	P146	1986-1990	Osu Sukam (اوسو بن سوكم)	BN (UMNO)
8th	P146	1990-1995	Osu Sukam (اوسو بن سوكم)	BN (UMNO)
9th	P153	1995-1999	Osu Sukam (اوسو بن سوكم)	BN (UMNO)
10th	P153	1999-2004	Osu Sukam (اوسو بن سوكم)	BN (UMNO)
11th	P175	2004-2008	Rosnah Abdul Rashid Shirlin (روسنه عبدالرشيد شيرلين)	BN (UMNO)
12th	P175	2008-2013	Rosnah Abdul Rashid Shirlin (روسنه عبدالرشيد شيرلين)	BN (UMNO)
13th	P175	2013-2018	Rosnah Abdul Rashid Shirlin (روسنه عبدالرشيد شيرلين)	BN (UMNO)
14th	P175	2018–2022	Ahmad Hassan (احمد حسن)	WARISAN
15th	P175	2022	Armizan Mohd Ali (ارميزن محمد علي)	GRS (BERSATU)
15th	P175	2022–present	Armizan Mohd Ali (ارميزن محمد علي)	GRS (Direct)

=== State constituency ===
Parliamentary constituency	State constituency					
Parliamentary constituency	1967–1974	1974–1985	1985–1995	1995–2004	2004–2020	2020–present
Papar			Buang Sayang			
Papar			Kawang			
Papar						Limbahau
Papar				Pantai Manis		

=== Historical boundaries ===
State Constituency	Area			
State Constituency	1984	1994	2003	2019
Buang Sayang	Benoni; Buang Sayang; Kayau; Ovai; Papar			
Kawang	Kaiduan; Kawang; Kinarut; Lok Kawi; Pengalat	Kaiduan; Kawang; Kinarut; Lok Kawi; Ovai	Kaiduan; Kawang; Kinarut; Lok Kawi; Pengalat	Beringis; Bundusan; Kawang; Kinarut; Pengalat
Limbahau				Gana; Kaiduan; Kampung Dambai; Limbahau; Surati
Pantai Manis		Benoni; Buang Sayang; Kampung Kabang; Pantai Manis; Papar	Benoni; Buang Sayang; Kampung Kabang; Kampung Mikik; Pantai Manis	Benoni; Buang Sayang; Kelanahan; Pantai Manis; Papar

=== Current state assembly members ===
No.	State Constituency	Member	Coalition (Party)
N27	Limbahau	Juil Nuatim	GRS (PBS)
N28	Kawang	Ghulam Haidar Khan Bahadar	GRS (GAGASAN)
N29	Pantai Manis	Pengiran Saifuddin Pengiran Tahir Petra	GRS (GAGASAN)

=== Local governments & postcodes ===
No	State Constituency	Local government	Postcode
N27	Limbahau	Papar District Council	89600 Papar
N28	Kawang	Papar District Council	89600 Papar
N29	Pantai Manis	Papar District Council	89600 Papar

== Election results ==
Malaysian general election, 2022
Party	Candidate	Votes	%	∆%
GRS	Armizan Mohd Ali	22,620	51.99	▲51.99
Heritage	Ahmad Hassan	10,396	23.89	▼24.65
PH	Henry Shim Chee On	9,144	21.02	▲21.02
PEJUANG	Nicholas Sylvester @ Berry	783	1.80	▲1.80
Independent	Johnny Sitamin	335	0.77	▲0.77
Independent	Norbert Chin Chuan Siong	231	0.53	▲0.53
Total valid votes		43,509	100.00	
Total rejected ballots		663		
Unreturned ballots		123		
Turnout		44,295	72.59	▼11.24
Registered electors		59,942		
Majority		12,224	28.10	▲27.19
GRS gain from Heritage		Swing		?
Source(s) https://lom.agc.gov.my/ilims/upload/portal/akta/outputp/1753262/PUB619_2022.pdf

Malaysian general election, 2018
Party	Candidate	Votes	%	∆%
Sabah Heritage Party	Ahmad Hassan	17,394	48.54	▲48.54
BN	Rosnah Abdul Rashid Shirlin	17,069	47.63	▼17.20
Homeland Solidarity Party	Jamil William Core	892	2.49	▼0.07
Love Sabah Party	Elbert Sikuil	481	1.34	▲1.34
Total valid votes		35,836	100.00	
Total rejected ballots		543		
Unreturned ballots		161		
Turnout		36,540	83.83	▼1.96
Registered electors		43,586		
Majority		325	0.91	▼31.31
Sabah Heritage Party gain from BN		Swing		?
Source(s) "His Majesty's Government Gazette - Notice of Contested Election, Parliament for the State of Sabah [P.U. (B) 246/2018]" (PDF). Attorney General's Chambers of Malaysia. 3 May 2018. "Federal Government Gazette - Results of Contested Election and Statements of the Poll after the Official Addition of Votes, Parliamentary Constituencies for the State of Sabah [P.U. (B) 320/2018]" (PDF). Attorney General's Chambers of Malaysia. 28 May 2018. Archived from the original (PDF) on December 29, 2019.

Malaysian general election, 2013
Party	Candidate	Votes	%	∆%
BN	Rosnah Abdul Rashid Shirlin	21,196	64.83	▲0.40
PKR	Yahya Lampong	10,661	32.61	▲8.36
STAR	Balon Mujim	838	2.56	▲2.56
Total valid votes		32,695	100.00	
Total rejected ballots		499		
Unreturned ballots		68		
Turnout		33,262	85.79	▲8.61
Registered electors		38,771		
Majority		10,535	32.22	▼7.96
BN hold		Swing		
Source(s) "Federal Government Gazette - Notice of Contested Election, Parliament for the State of Sabah [P.U. (B) 183/2013]" (PDF). Attorney General's Chambers of Malaysia. 26 April 2013. Archived from the original (PDF) on 30 September 2018. "Federal Government Gazette - Results of Contested Election and Statements of the Poll after the Official Addition of Votes, Parliamentary Constituencies for the State of Sabah [P.U. (B) 224/2013]" (PDF). Attorney General's Chambers of Malaysia. 22 May 2013. Archived from the original (PDF) on 30 September 2018.

Malaysian general election, 2008
Party	Candidate	Votes	%	∆%
BN	Rosnah Abdul Rashid Shirlin	15,352	64.43	▲64.43
PKR	Wahap Idris	5,778	24.25	▲24.25
Independent	Patrick Sindu	2,268	9.52	▲9.52
Independent	Mohd Hashim Yussup @ Yusof	429	1.80	▲1.80
Total valid votes		23,827	100.00	
Total rejected ballots		651		
Unreturned ballots		435		
Turnout		24,913	77.18	
Registered electors		32,279		
Majority		9,574	40.18	
BN hold		Swing		

Malaysian general election, 2004
Party	Candidate	Votes	%	∆%
On the nomination day, Rosnah Abdul Rashid Shirlin won uncontested.
BN	Rosnah Abdul Rashid Shirlin			
Total valid votes			100.00	
Total rejected ballots				
Unreturned ballots				
Turnout				
Registered electors				
Majority				
BN hold		Swing		

Malaysian general election, 1999
Party	Candidate	Votes	%	∆%
BN	Osu Sukam	14,013	64.81	▲8.13
PBS	Mohd Saidi Lampoh	7,608	35.19	▼6.93
Total valid votes		21,621	100.00	
Total rejected ballots		200		
Unreturned ballots		43		
Turnout		21,864	70.22	▼4.72
Registered electors		31,136		
Majority		6,405	29.62	▲15.06
BN hold		Swing		

Malaysian general election, 1995
Party	Candidate	Votes	%	∆%
BN	Osu Sukam	12,131	56.68	▲5.46
PBS	Juani @ Johnny Mositun	9,015	42.12	▲42.12
Independent	Mohd. Hashim Yussup	257	1.20	▲1.20
Total valid votes		21,403	100.00	
Total rejected ballots		204		
Unreturned ballots		58		
Turnout		21,665	74.94	▲3.14
Registered electors		28,909		
Majority		3,116	14.56	▲11.44
BN hold		Swing		

Malaysian general election, 1990
Party	Candidate	Votes	%	∆%
BN	Osu Sukam	8,452	51.22	▲2.30
Independent	Abd. Rahman Juman	7,939	48.10	▲48.10
Independent	Wences B. Lajingah	45	0.27	▲0.27
Independent	Md. Ariff Ab. Bakar	41	0.25	▲0.25
Independent	Huang Tzin Tat @ Alexander	27	0.16	▲0.16
Total valid votes		16,504	100.00	
Total rejected ballots		109		
Unreturned ballots		0		
Turnout		16,613	71.80	▲13.81
Registered electors		23,138		
Majority		513	3.12	▲1.03
BN hold		Swing		

Malaysian general election, 1986
Party	Candidate	Votes	%
BN	Osu Sukam	4,844	48.92
Independent	James Ghani	4,638	46.83
Independent	Othman Mohd Yassin	421	4.25
Total valid votes		9,903	100.00
Total rejected ballots		92	
Unreturned ballots		0	
Turnout		9,995	57.99
Registered electors		17,237	
Majority		206	2.09
This was a new constituency created.
