= Alexander Nanta Linggi =

Malaysian politician

Yang Berhormat Dato Sri Alexander Nanta Linggi PJN PNBS SSAP PBS MP
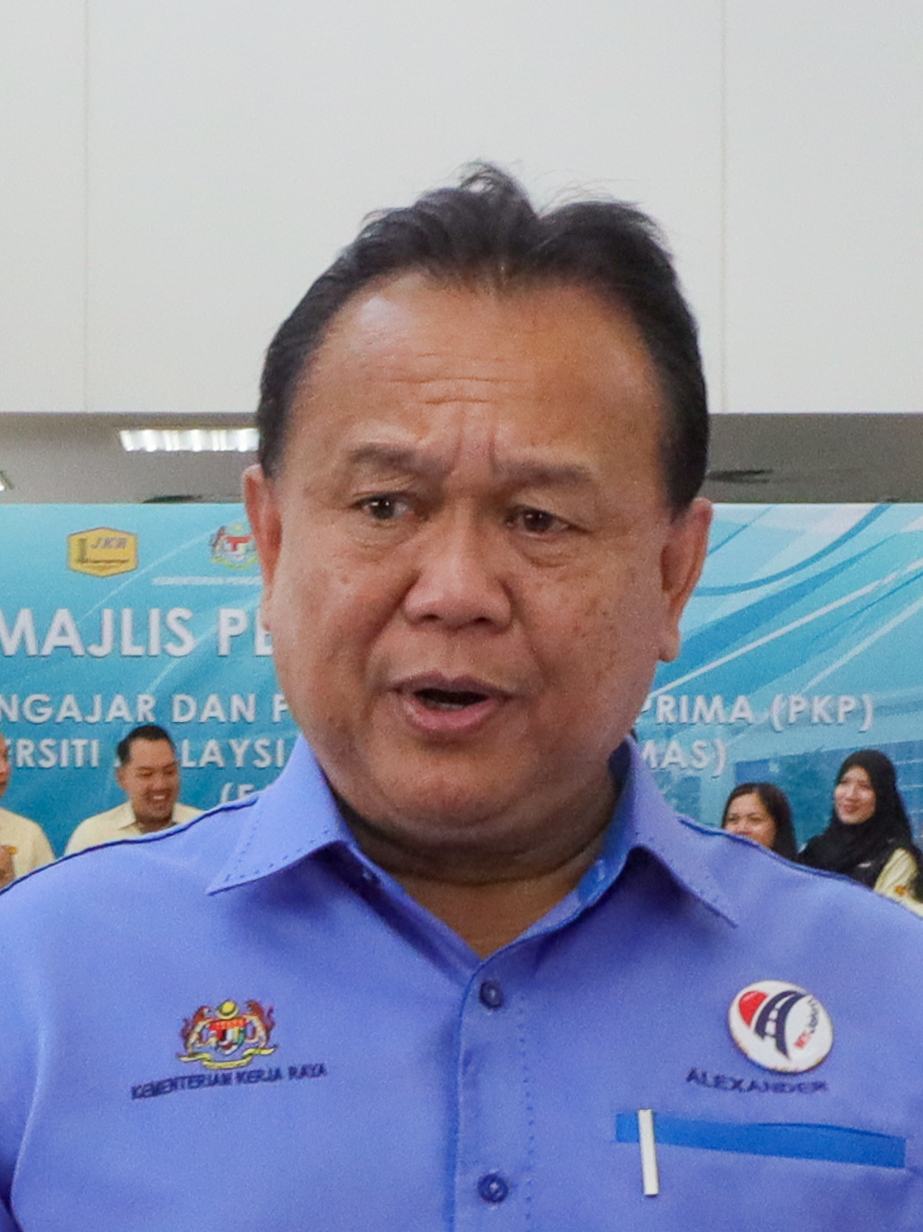
- Alexander Nanta Linggi in 2024

Minister of Works
- Incumbent
- Assumed office 3 December 2022
- Monarchs: Abdullah (2022–2024); Ibrahim Iskandar (since 2024)
- Prime Minister: Anwar Ibrahim
- Deputy: Abdul Rahman Mohamad (2022–2023); Ahmad Maslan (since 2023)
- Preceded by: Fadillah Yusof
- Constituency: Kapit

Minister of Entrepreneur and Cooperatives Development
- Acting
- In office 3 December 2025 – 17 December 2025
- Monarch: Ibrahim
- Prime Minister: Anwar Ibrahim
- Deputy: Ramanan Ramakrishnan
- Preceded by: Ewon Benedick
- Constituency: Kapit

Minister of Domestic Trade and Consumer Affairs
- In office 30 August 2021 – 24 November 2022
- Monarch: Abdullah
- Prime Minister: Ismail Sabri Yaakob
- Deputy: Rosol Wahid
- Preceded by: Himself
- Succeeded by: Salahuddin Ayub (as Minister of Domestic Trade and Living Costs)
- Constituency: Kapit
- In office 10 March 2020 – 16 August 2021
- Monarch: Abdullah
- Prime Minister: Muhyiddin Yassin
- Deputy: Rosol Wahid
- Preceded by: Saifuddin Nasution Ismail
- Succeeded by: Himself
- Constituency: Kapit

Deputy Minister of Rural and Regional Development
- In office 16 May 2013 – 9 May 2018 Serving with Ahmad Jazlan Yaakub (2015–2018)
- Monarchs: Abdul Halim (2013–2016); Muhammad V (2016–2018)
- Prime Minister: Najib Razak
- Minister: Shafie Apdal (2013–2015); Ismail Sabri Yaakob (2015–2018)
- Preceded by: Hasan Malek
- Succeeded by: Sivarasa Rasiah
- Constituency: Kapit

Member of the Malaysian Parliament for Kapit
- Incumbent
- Assumed office 29 November 1999
- Preceded by: James Jimbun Pungga (BN–PBB)
- Majority: 11, 016 (1999); Walkover (2004); Walkover (2008); 9, 731 (2013); 10, 479 (2018); 12, 402 (2022)

Personal details
- Born: 16 June 1958 (age 68) Crown Colony of Sarawak
- Citizenship: Malaysia
- Party: Parti Pesaka Bumiputera Bersatu
- Other political affiliations: Barisan Nasional (until 2018, since 2020); Gabungan Parti Sarawak (since 2018); Perikatan Nasional (2020–22); Pakatan Harapan (since 2022)
- Spouse: Angelina Celestine Ujang
- Relations: Jugah Barieng (grandfather); Celestine Ujang Jilan (father-in-law); Wilson Ugak Kumbong (cousin)

Alexander Nanta Linggi (born 16 June 1958) is a Malaysian politician who served as the Minister of Works since 2022. A member of Parti Pesaka Bumiputera Bersatu, he represented Kapit in the Parliament of Malaysia since 1999.

He is Secretary-General of both Parti Pesaka Bumiputera Bersatu (PBB) and its coalition Gabungan Parti Sarawak (GPS). He has served as Minister of Works in the Unity Government administration under Prime Minister Anwar Ibrahim since December 2022. He served as the Minister of Domestic Trade and Consumer Affairs for the second term in the Barisan Nasional (BN) administration under former Prime Minister Ismail Sabri Yaakob from August 2021 to the collapse of the BN administration in November 2022 and his first term in Perikatan Nasional (PN) administration under former Prime Minister Muhyiddin Yassin from March 2020 to the collapse of the PN administration in August 2021 as well as the Deputy Minister of Rural and Regional Development in the Barisan Nasional (BN) administration under former Prime Minister Najib Razak and former Ministers Shafie Apdal and Ismail Sabri Yaakob from May 2013 to the collapse of the BN administration in May 2018. He has also served as the Member of Parliament (MP) for Kapit since November 1999. He is also the cousin of Wilson Ugak Kumbong, the current Deputy Minister of Digital and MP for Hulu Rajang.

== Personal life ==
Nanta is the grandson of former Sarawak leaders Tun Jugah anak Barieng (patrilineal) and Temenggong Dato' Banyang anak Janting (matrilineal) and the son of former politician Tan Sri Leonard Linggi Jugah. In turn he is also the son-in-law of another politician, Tan Sri Celestine Ujang Jilan, as he is married to the latter's daughter, Datin Angelina. He is also a businessman, having served as the Chairman of shipping company Swee Joo Bhd.

== Political career ==
On 16 May 2013, after Nanta's victory in the 2013 Malaysian general election, he was appointed as Deputy Minister for Rural and Regional Development in the new Cabinet of Prime Minister Najib Razak.

Later in 2020, he became a full cabinet member by holding the position of Minister of Domestic Trade and Consumer Affairs after defending the Kapit parliamentary seat in the 2018 Malaysian general election for more than five terms (although it was the only election that witnessed a change in government after 61 years of dominant-party rule by the Barisan Nasional), in the aftermath of the 2020–2022 Malaysian political crisis and held this ministerial position until the 2022 general elections.

In 2022, he was appointed as Minister of Works and has remained since.

== Election results ==
Parliament of Malaysia
Year	Constituency	Candidate	Votes	Pct	Opponent(s)	Votes	Pct	Turnout	Majority	Turnout%
1999	P188 Kapit	Alexander Nanta Linggi (PBB)	12,157	85.97%	Richard Nujong Abit (IND)	1,141	8.07%	14,442	11,016	65.75%
1999	P188 Kapit	Alexander Nanta Linggi (PBB)	12,157	85.97%	Nor Azman Abdullah @ Baginda Minda (PKR)	843	5.96%	14,442	11,016	65.75%
2004	P214 Kapit	Alexander Nanta Linggi (PBB)	Walkover							
2008	P215 Kapit	Alexander Nanta Linggi (PBB)	Walkover							
2013	P215 Kapit	Alexander Nanta Linggi (PBB)	13,446	78.35%	Ramli Malaka (DAP)	3,715	21.65%	17,474	9,731	66.71%
2018	P215 Kapit	Alexander Nanta Linggi (PBB)	14,302	78.91%	Paren Nyawi (DAP)	3,823	21.09%	18,485	10,479	57.82%
2022	P215 Kapit	Alexander Nanta Linggi (PBB)	16,522	75.10%	Khusyairy Pangkas Unggang (PKR)	4,120	18.73%	21,999	12,402	48.66%
2022	P215 Kapit	Alexander Nanta Linggi (PBB)	16,522	75.10%	Robert Saweng (PBDS)	1,357	6.17%	21,999	12,402	48.66%

== Honours ==
=== Honours of Malaysia ===
- Malaysia
  - Commander of the Order of Meritorious Service (PJN) – Datuk (2010)
  - Recipient of the 17th Yang di-Pertuan Agong Installation Medal (2024)
- Pahang
  - Knight Grand Companion of the Order of Sultan Ahmad Shah of Pahang (SSAP) – Dato' Sri (2026)
- Sarawak
  - Knight Commander of the Most Exalted Order of the Star of Sarawak (PNBS) – Dato Sri (2020)
  - Officer of the Most Exalted Order of the Star of Sarawak (PBS) (2004)
  - Recipient of the Sarawak Independence Golden Jubilee Medal (2013)
  - Gold Medal of the Sarawak Independence Diamond Jubilee Medal (2023)

== See also ==
- Kapit (federal constituency)
