= Kapit (federal constituency) =

Federal constituency of Sarawak, Malaysia

Kapit (P215)
Sarawak constituency

Federal constituency
- Legislature: Dewan Rakyat
- MP: Alexander Nanta Linggi; GPS
- Constituency created: 1968
- First contested: 1969
- Last contested: 2022

Demographics
- Population (2020): 43,981
- Electors (2022): 45,210
- Area (km²): 6,331
- Pop. density (per km²): 6.9

Kapit is a federal constituency in Kapit Division (Song District & Kapit District), Sarawak, Malaysia, that has been represented in the Dewan Rakyat since 1971.

The federal constituency was created in the 1968 redistribution and is mandated to return a single member to the Dewan Rakyat under the first past the post voting system.

== Demographics ==
https://ge15.orientaldaily.com.my/seats/sarawak/p

Ethnic breakdown of Kapit's electorate as of 2022
1. Sarawak bumiputera (85.7%)
2. Chinese (9.00%)
3. Malay-Muslim bumiputera (4.40%)
4. Other ethnicities (0.90%)
Age breakdown of Kapit's electorate as of 2022
1. 18-20 (6.79%)
2. 21-29 (20.9%)
3. 30-39 (21.6%)
4. 40-49 (16.7%)
5. 50-59 (15.7%)
6. 60-69 (10.0%)
7. 70-79 (5.33%)
8. 80-89 (2.07%)
9. above 90 (0.94%)
Gender breakdown of Kapit's electorate as of 2022
1. Male (49.5%)
2. Female (50.5%)

== History ==
=== Polling districts ===
According to the gazette issued on 31 October 2022, the Kapit constituency has a total of 19 polling districts.

State constituency	Polling Districts	Code	Location
Pelagus（N61）	Pelagus	215/61/01	RH Bunyau Pulau Pisang; RH Mengga Ng. Semenuang; RH Jelani Kerangan Bangat Batang Rajang; SK Ng. Encheremin; RH Seliong; RH Rabar Ng; RII Jengeng Ng Mela; SK Ng. Pelagus; RH Achong Ng. Benin; SK Ulu Pelagus; RH Antau Sg Pelagus; RH George Sg. Pelagus
Pelagus（N61）	Sungai Amang	215/61/02	SK Sg. Amang
Pelagus（N61）	Nanga Peraran	215/61/03	SK Ng. Peraran; RH Budit Ng. Mekey; RH Jelanie Ng Sama; RH Sabang Ng Buya; RH Johnny Sg. Sut
Pelagus（N61）	Sut	215/61/04	RH Johnny Sg. Sut; RH Sanggau Sg. Sut; RH Belikau Sg. Sut; RH Jugah Sut; RH Baraoh Tembawai Sandong Baroh; RH Emak; RH Al, Entawau Ulu; RH Mamot; RH Taing; SK Ng. Bena; RH Nyawai Sg. Bena; RH Nyawai; RH Naga; SK Ng. Kebiaw; SK Lepong Balleh; RH Gawan; SK Ng Mujong; SK Ng Bawai; RH Bengau Sg. Sut
Katibas (N62)	Manap	215/62/01	RH Buni Sg. Lajan; RH Edward, Ng. Lajan Sg. Lijau; RH Darlin Sg. Lijau; RH Timothy Ason (Rh Jureng) Manap Batu; RH Muni @ Rua Lepong Aur; RH Tanang (Rh Balan) Ng. Embuau; RH Ngitar Lubok Rerong; RH Sugai Ng Sebetong Sg. Song
Katibas (N62)	Temelat	215/62/02	RH Kennedy, Ng Bekakap. Ulu Sg Iran; RH Runi, Ng, Selepong, Ulu Sg. Iran; SK Ng. Dalai Sg. Iran; RH Musin Ng Wai Sg. Iran; RH Gawan Ng Sebirah Sg. Iran; RH Chirry Ng Setindok Emperan Munti Sg. Iran; RH Jamba Ng. Santu Sg. Iran; SK Temalat; RH Nobert. Sesawa Batang Rajang; RH Sering, Ng Temiang, Batang Rajang; RIH Austin Ekau Ng Sipan Batang; SK Ng. Benguang
Katibas (N62)	Song	215/62/03	SJK (C) Hin Hua Song; Madrasah Kpg Gelam
Katibas (N62)	Katibas	215/62/04	RH Joslee Ng. Matalau; RH Demang Emperan Menuang Sg. Musah; RH Baro Ng. Semulong Sg. Musah; RH Japok Ng Senyaru Musah; RH Gelana Ng Tekalit; RH Jala Ng Miaw Katibas Hilir; RH Serit Ng. Setapang Sg. Takan; RH Zachius Nyalu, Ng Takan, Katibas; RH Cecelia Bunsu Ng, Kebiew; RH Wil Ng. Nyimoh; RH Delok Sg. Engkabau
Katibas (N62)	Tapang	215/62/05	RH Api Ng. Terusa; SK Lubok Ipoh; RH Sebun Ng. Masak; RH Gendang Karangan Rangkang; RH Nugu Ng. Sesibau; RII Jinggong Ng. Anchau
Katibas (N62)	Bangkit	215/62/06	RH Kana, Kerangan Panjang, Ulu Sg. Bangkit; RH Akang, Batu Pikul, Sg Bangkit; RH Lauang, Sg Ayat, Ulu Bangkit; RIH Lasin Rantau Abau Sg. Bangkit; RH Badag Ng Meluan Sg. Bangkit; SK Ng. Bangkit; RH Ribut Ng. Serau; RH Dagom Ng Makot; RH Bangau Ng Entuat; RH ljau Ng. Mukeh
Katibas (N62)	Tekalit	215/62/07	RH Gilbert Nyandang Ng. Sepunggok Tekali; RH Melayu Ng. Latong Tekalit; RH Sibat Ulu Sg. Janan Tekalit; SK Ng. Janan Tekalit; RH Changai Ng. Tenggangai Tekalit; RH Endah Ng Sepayang Sg Tekalit; SK Ng. Nansang Tekalit; RH Barain, Ng. Sebungkang, Sg Tekalit
Bukit Goram (N63)	Sungai Kapit	215/63/01	SK Sg. Kapit; RH Bundong, Sebabai Ili, Jalan Bukit Goram
Bukit Goram (N63)	Kapit	215/63/02	SJK (C) Hock Lam Kapit
Bukit Goram (N63)	Menuan	215/63/03	SK Ulu Menuan; RH Sli Sg. Menuan; RH Manggan Menuan; RH Lampoh Sg Menuan; SK Lepong Menuan; RH Jambon, Ng. Ensilai; RH Dingai Ng. Goh
Bukit Goram (N63)	Ibau	215/63/04	SK Ulu Yong; RH Manok Sg Yong; RH Empawi Sg. Yong; RH Ngelai Sg. Yong; SK Ng. Terusa; RH Nuga, Semujan Ili Belawai; RH Seliong, Sekerangan Atas, Sg. Belawai; RH Bena, Ng Sema. Sg Yong; RH Ekau, Ng Semawang, Batang Rajang; RH Kayan, Ng Dia, Batang Rajang; SK Ng. Segenok; RH Beli, Ng Ensurai, Sg. Ibau; SK Ng Ibau
Bukit Goram (N63)	Kampung Baru	215/63/05	SK Kapit
Bukit Goram (N63)	Selirik	215/63/06	SK Methodist; RH Juin, Rantau Tapang, Sg Seranau; RH Barnabas, Kampung Serian, Batang Rajang; RH Ayu, Ng. Tulie Baruh
Bukit Goram (N63)	Sibau	215/63/07	RH John Sg. Sibau
Bukit Goram (N63)	Entagai	215/63/08	RH Baja Sg. Entangai; SK Ulu Melipis; RH Untat Sg. Melipis; RH Robert

=== Representation history ===
Members of Parliament for Kapit
Parliament	No	Years	Member	Party	Vote Share
Constituency created
		1969-1971	Parliament was suspended		
3rd	P139	1971-1974	Abit Angkin	SNAP	3,008; 41.69%
4th	P149	1974-1978	Abit Angkin	BN (PBB)	3,786; 50.42%
5th	P149	1978-1982	Leonard Linggi Jugah	BN (PBB)	5,122; 67.49%
6th	P149	1982-1986	Leonard Linggi Jugah	BN (PBB)	Uncontested
7th	P172	1986-1990	James Jimbun Pungga	BN (PBB)	5,034; 62.38%
8th	P175	1990-1995	James Jimbun Pungga	BN (PBB)	7,403; 53.93%
9th	P177	1995-1999	James Jimbun Pungga	BN (PBB)	7,917; 58.84%
10th	P178	1999-2004	Alexander Nanta Linggi	BN (PBB)	12,157; 85.97%
11th	P214	2004-2008	Alexander Nanta Linggi	BN (PBB)	Uncontested
12th	P215	2008-2013	Alexander Nanta Linggi	BN (PBB)	Uncontested
13th	P215	2013-2018	Alexander Nanta Linggi	BN (PBB)	13,446; 78.35%
14th	P215	2018	Alexander Nanta Linggi	BN (PBB)	14,302; 78.91%
14th	P215	2018–2022	Alexander Nanta Linggi	GPS (PBB)	14,302; 78.91%
15th	P215	2022–present	Alexander Nanta Linggi	GPS (PBB)	16,522; 75.10%

=== State constituency ===
Parliamentary constituency	State constituency					
Parliamentary constituency	1969–1978	1978–1990	1990–1999	1999–2008	2008–2016	2016−present
Kapit						Bukit Goram
Kapit		Katibas				
Kapit	Song					
Kapit	Pelagus					

=== Historical boundaries ===
State Constituency	Area					
State Constituency	1968	1977	1987	1996	2005	2015
Bukit Goram						Bukit Goram; Entagai; Kapit; Sibau; Sungai Yong
Katibas		Katibas; Nanga Matalau; Song; Sungai Lajan; Tapau				
Song	Katibas; Nanga Matalau; Song; Sungai Lajan; Tapau					
Pelagus	Kapit; Nanga Dap; Nanga Merit; Pelagus; Kapit					Nanga Dap; Nanga Merit; Pelagus; Sungai Mujong; Sungai Paku

=== Current state assembly members ===
No.	State Constituency	Member	Coalition (Party)
N61	Pelagus	Wilson Nyabong Ijang	GPS (PRS)
N62	Katibas	Lidam Assan	GPS (PBB)
N63	Bukit Goram	Jefferson Jamit Unyat	GPS (PBB)

=== Local governments & postcodes ===
No.	State Constituency	Local Government	Postcode
N61	Pelagus	Kapit District Council	96800 Kapit; 96850 Song
N62	Katibas	Kapit District Council	96800 Kapit; 96850 Song
N63	Bukit Goram	Kapit District Council	96800 Kapit; 96850 Song

== Election results ==
Malaysian general election, 2022
Party	Candidate	Votes	%	∆%
GPS	Alexander Nanta Linggi	16,522	75.10	▲75.10
PH	Khusyairy Pangkas Abdullah @ Pangkas Unggang	4,120	18.73	▲18.73
PBDS Baru	Robert Saweng	1,357	6.17	▲6.17
Total valid votes		21,999	100.00	
Total rejected ballots		382		
Unreturned ballots		164		
Turnout		22,545	48.66	▼11.63
Registered electors		45,210		
Majority		12,402	56.37	▼1.45
GPS gain from BN		Swing		?
Source(s) https://lom.agc.gov.my/ilims/upload/portal/akta/outputp/1753265/PARLIMEN%20SARAWAK%20(PUB%20620).pdf

Malaysian general election, 2018
Party	Candidate	Votes	%	∆%
BN	Alexander Nanta Linggi	14,302	78.91	▲0.56
DAP	Paren Nyawi	3,823	21.09	▼0.56
Total valid votes		18,125	100.00	
Total rejected ballots		278		
Unreturned ballots		82		
Turnout		18,485	60.29	▼6.42
Registered electors		30,658		
Majority		10,479	57.82	▲1.12
BN hold		Swing		
Source(s) "His Majesty's Government Gazette - Notice of Contested Election, Parliament for the State of Sarawak [P.U. (B) 247/2018]" (PDF). Attorney General's Chambers of Malaysia. 3 May 2018. "Federal Government Gazette - Results of Contested Election and Statements of the Poll after the Official Addition of Votes, Parliamentary Constituencies for the State of Sarawak [P.U. (B) 321/2018]" (PDF). Attorney General's Chambers of Malaysia. 28 May 2018. Archived from the original (PDF) on 2019-12-29.

Malaysian general election, 2013
Party	Candidate	Votes	%	∆%
BN	Alexander Nanta Linggi	13,446	78.35	▲78.35
DAP	Ramli Malaka	3,715	21.65	▲21.65
Total valid votes		17,161	100.00	
Total rejected ballots		271		
Unreturned ballots		42		
Turnout		17,474	66.71	
Registered electors		26,195		
Majority		9,731	56.70	
BN hold		Swing		
Source(s) "Federal Government Gazette - Notice of Contested Election, Parliament for the State of Sarawak [P.U. (B) 184/2013]" (PDF). Attorney General's Chambers of Malaysia. 26 April 2013. Archived from the original (PDF) on 2018-09-30. "Federal Government Gazette - Results of Contested Election and Statements of the Poll after the Official Addition of Votes, Parliamentary Constituencies for the State of Sarawak [P.U. (B) 225/2013]" (PDF). Attorney General's Chambers of Malaysia. 22 May 2013. Archived from the original (PDF) on 2018-09-30.

Malaysian general election, 2008
Party	Candidate	Votes	%	∆%
On the nomination day, Alexander Nanta Linggi won uncontested.
BN	Alexander Nanta Linggi			
Total valid votes			100.00	
Total rejected ballots				
Unreturned ballots				
Turnout				
Registered electors		22,723		
Majority				
BN hold		Swing		

Malaysian general election, 2004
Party	Candidate	Votes	%	∆%
On the nomination day, Alexander Nanta Linggi won uncontested.
BN	Alexander Nanta Linggi			
Total valid votes			100.00	
Total rejected ballots				
Unreturned ballots				
Turnout				
Registered electors		23,330		
Majority				
BN hold		Swing		

Malaysian general election, 1999
Party	Candidate	Votes	%	∆%
BN	Alexander Nanta Linggi	12,157	85.97	▲27.13
Independent	Richard Nujong Abit	1,141	8.07	▲8.07
PKR	Nor Azman Abdullah @ Baginda Minda	843	5.96	▲5.96
Total valid votes		14,141	100.00	
Total rejected ballots		227		
Unreturned ballots		54		
Turnout		14,422	65.75	▼1.09
Registered electors		21,934		
Majority		11,016	77.90	▲60.22
BN hold		Swing		

Malaysian general election, 1995
Party	Candidate	Votes	%	∆%
BN	James Jimbun Pungga	7,917	58.84	▲4.91
Independent	Lau Ung Hai	5,539	41.16	▲41.16
Total valid votes		13,456	100.00	
Total rejected ballots		435		
Unreturned ballots		52		
Turnout		13,943	66.84	▼11.09
Registered electors		20,859		
Majority		2,378	17.68	▲8.64
BN hold		Swing		

Malaysian general election, 1990
Party	Candidate	Votes	%	∆%
BN	James Jimbun Pungga	7,403	53.93	▼8.45
Independent	Sng Chee Hua	6,162	44.89	▲44.89
Independent	Ahmad Salleh	163	1.19	▲1.19
Total valid votes		13,728	100.00	
Total rejected ballots		186		
Unreturned ballots		0		
Turnout		13,914	77.93	▲22.98
Registered electors		17,854		
Majority		1,241	9.04	▼15.72
BN hold		Swing		

Malaysian general election, 1986
Party	Candidate	Votes	%	∆%
BN	James Jimbun Pungga	5,034	62.38	▲62.38
Independent	Ahmad Salleh	3,036	37.62	▲37.62
Total valid votes		8,070	100.00	
Total rejected ballots		409		
Unreturned ballots		0		
Turnout		8,479	54.95	
Registered electors		15,431		
Majority		1,998	24.76	
BN hold		Swing		

Malaysian general election, 1982
Party	Candidate	Votes	%	∆%
On the nomination day, Leonard Linggi Jugah won uncontested.
BN	Leonard Linggi Jugah			
Total valid votes			100.00	
Total rejected ballots				
Unreturned ballots				
Turnout				
Registered electors		14,555		
Majority				
BN hold		Swing		

Malaysian general election, 1978
Party	Candidate	Votes	%	∆%
BN	Leonard Linggi Jugah	5,122	67.49	▲17.07
Parti Anak Jati Sarawak	Hillary Simon Salleh	2,467	32.51	▲32.51
Total valid votes		7,589	100.00	
Total rejected ballots		336		
Unreturned ballots		0		
Turnout		7,925	59.32	▼7.55
Registered electors		13,359		
Majority		2,655	34.98	▲34.14
BN hold		Swing		

Malaysian general election, 1974
Party	Candidate	Votes	%	∆%
BN	Abit Angkin	3,786	50.42	▲8.73
SNAP	Nuing Kadi	3,723	49.58	▲7.89
Total valid votes		7,509	100.00	
Total rejected ballots		690		
Unreturned ballots		0		
Turnout		8,199	66.87	▼8.42
Registered electors		12,262		
Majority		63	0.84	▼4.84
BN gain from SNAP		Swing		?

Malaysian general election, 1969
Party	Candidate	Votes	%
SNAP	Abit Angkin	3,008	41.69
PESAKA	Jinggot Atan	2,598	36.01
Independent	Kuleh	1,609	22.30
Total valid votes		7,215	100.00
Total rejected ballots		706	
Unreturned ballots		0	
Turnout		7,921	75.29
Registered electors		10,521	
Majority		410	5.68
This was a new constituency created.
