= 2014 Kajang by-election =

Election in Malaysia

- 23 March 2014

Kajang seat in the Selangor State Legislative Assembly
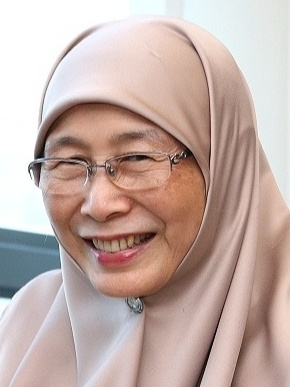
Candidate	Wan Azizah Wan Ismail	Chew Mei Fun
Party	PKR	BN (MCA)
Alliance	PR
Popular vote	16,741	11,362
Percentage	59.57%	40.43%
Kajang assemblyman before election
Lee Chin Cheh
PKR
Elected Kajang assemblyman
Wan Azizah Wan Ismail
PKR

A by-election was held for the Selangor State Assembly seat of Kajang on 23 March 2014 following the nomination day on 11 March 2014. The seat was vacated after the incumbent assemblyman, Lee Chin Cheh resigned on 27 January 2014. Lee was an assemblyman from the Parti Keadilan Rakyat, a component party of Pakatan Rakyat. He won by a majority of 6,824 votes against 5 other candidates in the general elections in 2013.

Federal parliamentary opposition leader Anwar Ibrahim had confirmed to stand as the Pakatan Rakyat candidate in the by-election. However, due to the unusually swift conviction by the Court of Appeal in his sodomy case, his wife Wan Azizah Wan Ismail replaced him as the PR candidate. Barisan Nasional, which forms the opposition in the Selangor Assembly, named MCA vice president and former Petaling Jaya Utara MP Chew Mei Fun as their candidate.

The by-election was won by Dr Wan Azizah with a majority of 5,379 votes. The turnout in this by-election decreased by 16% from the general election in 2013.

== Results ==
Selangor state by-election, 23 March 2014: Kajang Upon the resignation of incumbent, Lee Chin Cheh
Party	Candidate	Votes	%	∆%
PKR	Wan Azizah Wan Ismail	16,741	59.57	+ 1.58
BN	Chew Mei Fun	11,362	40.43	+ 2.66
Total valid votes		28,103	100.00	
Total rejected ballots		176		
Unreturned ballots		38		
Turnout		28,317	72.09	
Registered electors		39,278		
Majority		5,379		
PKR hold		Swing		
Source(s) "Pilihan Raya Kecil N.25 Kajang". Election Commission of Malaysia. "Federal Government Gazette - Notice of Contested Election - By-election of the State Legislative Assembly of N.25 Kajang for the State of Selangor [P.U. (B) 86/2014]" (PDF). Attorney General's Chambers of Malaysia. 12 March 2014. "Federal Government Gazette - Results of Contested Election and Statement of the Poll after the Official Addition of Votes for the By-election of N.25 Kajang [P.U. (B) 113/2014]" (PDF). Attorney General's Chambers of Malaysia. 1 April 2014.

== See also ==
- Kajang Move
