= Minister of Digital =

Malaysian ministry

- Menteri Digital

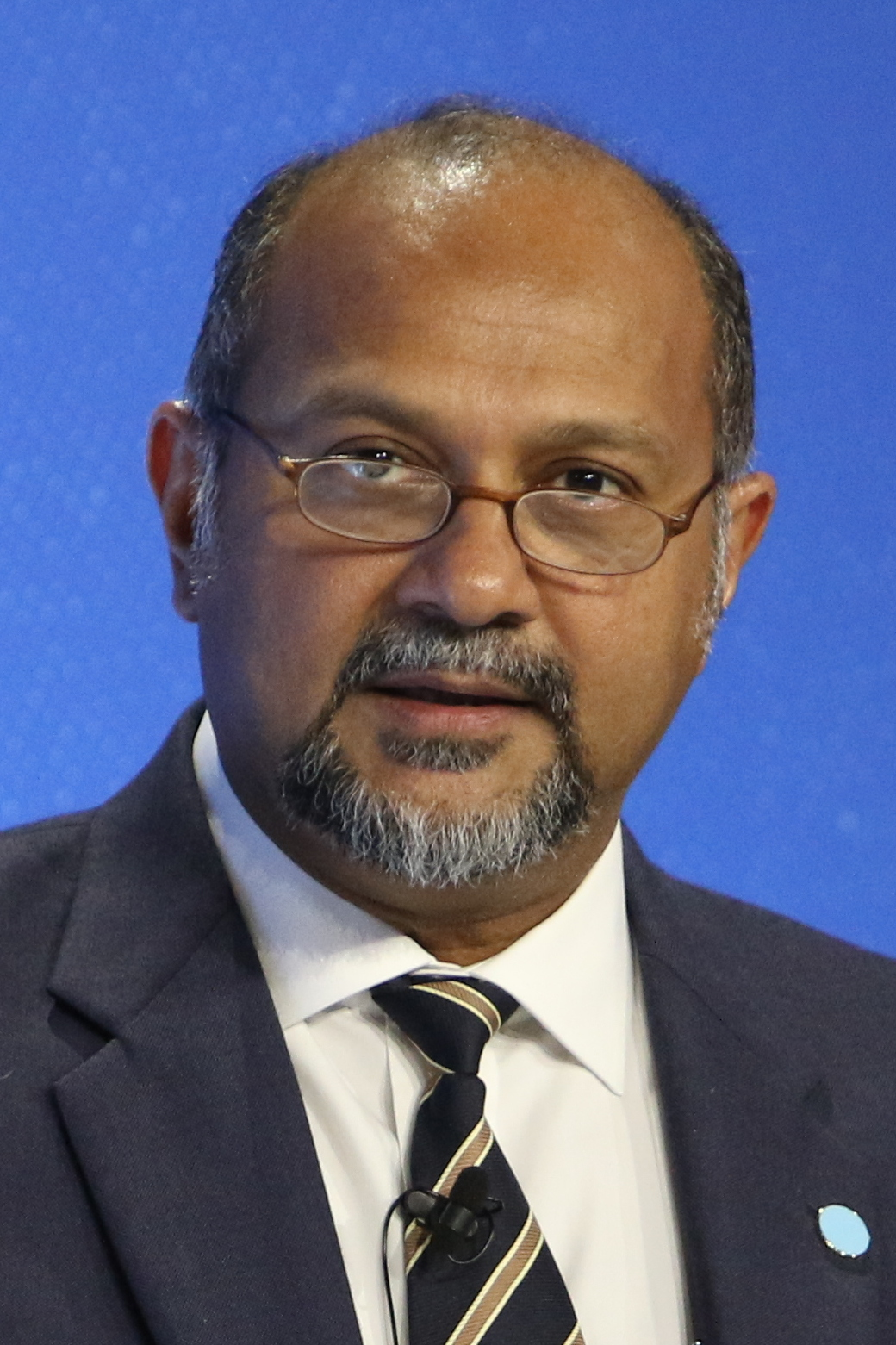
- Incumbent; Gobind Singh Deo since 12 December 2023
- Ministry of Digital
- Style: Yang Berhormat Menteri (The Honourable Minister)
- Abbreviation: YBM KDM
- Member of: Cabinet of Malaysia
- Reports to: Prime Minister of Malaysia
- Seat: Putrajaya
- Nominator: Prime Minister of Malaysia
- Appointer: Yang di-Pertuan Agong on the recommendation of the Prime Minister of Malaysia
- Precursor: Minister of Communications and Multimedia
- Formation: 2022
- First holder: Ong Yoke Lin (Minister of Communications, Telecommunications and Posts)
- Deputy: Deputy Minister YB Wilson Ugak Kumbong
- Salary: RM14,907.20
- Website: www.digital.gov.my

The Minister of Digital in Malaysia has been Gobind Singh Deo since 12 December 2023. The minister is deputised by the Deputy Minister of Digital. The minister administers the portfolio through the Ministry of Digital.

Before December 2023, this portfolio was placed under the responsibility of the Minister of Communications.

== List of ministers ==
The following individuals have been appointed as Minister of Digital, or any of its precedent titles:

Political party: PH

| Portrait | Name (Birth–Death) Constituency | Political party | Title | Took office | Left office | Deputy Minister | Prime Minister (Cabinet) |
|---|---|---|---|---|---|---|---|
| | Fahmi Fadzil (b.1981); MP for Lembah Pantai | PH (PKR) | Minister of Communications and Digital | 3 December 2022 | 12 December 2023 | Teo Nie Ching | Anwar Ibrahim (I) |
| | Gobind Singh Deo (b. 1973); MP for Damansara | PH (DAP) | Minister of Digital | 12 December 2023 | Incumbent | Wilson Ugak Kumbong | Anwar Ibrahim (I) |
