= Chew Hoong Ling =

Malaysian writer (born 1980)

- 周虹伶

Personal details
- Born: Chew Hoong Ling; 25 December 1980 (age 45) Kuala Lumpur, Malaysia
- Citizenship: Malaysian
- Party: Malaysian Chinese Association (MCA)
- Other political affiliations: Barisan Nasional (BN)
- Profession: Politician, author, professional master of ceremonies, inspirational speaker and social activist.

Chew Hoong Ling (Chinese: 周虹伶; Pe̍h-ōe-jī: Chiu Hông-lêng; born 25 December 1980 in Kuala Lumpur, Malaysia) is a Malaysian author, professional master of ceremonies, inspirational speaker and social activist and politician. She was a TV presenter for a Malay talk show Selamat Pagi Malaysia (translated as "Good Morning Malaysia") on Malaysia's national TV channel, Radio Televisyen Malaysia (RTM). Currently she is a host for an online radio station. In 2009, she came to prominence when she donated part of her liver to a stranger.

== Early life ==
Chew's parents divorced when she was 5 years old and was brought up in a small town called Teluk Intan, Perak. She was raised in a strict disciplinarian style and in school, semi-military trained under one of the school's uniform units, St. John Ambulance.
Her early education was in Convent schools. She graduated with an honours degree in Information Systems from the Thames Valley University, UK.

== Organ donation ==
After reading an article in a book called Life's Great Gifts about an eleven-year-old girl who pledged her organs, she was inspired to sign an organ donation pledge at the age of 13. Since then, she promoted organ donation and later in 2009, donated 60% of her liver to a Malaysian teenage girl, Lee An Qi, at Gleneagles Hospital, Singapore.

She wrote a book about the experience, I Don't Know You but Let Me Save You and its Chinese translation 我把肝脏给了一位陌生人 (literally translated as "I gave my liver to a stranger").

In 2010, she was appointed the committee member of the Public Awareness Action Committee for Organ and Tissue Donation under the Ministry of Health Malaysia and in 2013, appointed one of the Organ Donation Ambassadors to promote organ donation in Malaysia which registers only about 200,000 people.

== Social activism ==
Chew started activism in school, idolising a local social activist, Tan Sri Lee Lam Thye and always wanted to be like her idol. She was active in the St. John Ambulance of Malaysia since school days. After leaving school she was promoted to Divisional Officer and last held National Staff Officer before she resigned in 2009.

In her neighbourhood, she actively participated in and organised crime prevention programs and was the founder of the Pandan Jaya Neighbourhood Watch.

She is the founder of Voice of Women, a platform for other young women who want to contribute to society. Through the organisation she "convinced Sunlight Radio Taxi to get 100 taxi drivers to fly green ribbons and give out flyers to passengers to promote organ donation. Through the association, other women have also come forward to do other meaningful activities for various sections of the community."

== Politics ==
In 2013, she was selected as a candidate of Barisan Nasional (BN) for Petaling Jaya Utara (PJU) parliamentary seat during 2013 general election; against the incumbent Tony Pua from DAP. DAP's Tony Pua wins PJU with a 44,672 majority. He received 57,407 votes, beating BN's Chew who got 12,735 votes.

== Election results ==
Parliament of Malaysia
Year	Constituency	Candidate	Votes	Pct	Opponent(s)	Votes	Pct	Ballots cast	Majority	Turnout
2013	P106 Petaling Jaya Utara	Chew Hoong Ling (MCA)	12,735	18.16%	Tony Pua Kiam Wee (DAP)	57,407	81.84%	70,727	44,672	82.82%

== Awards ==
- 2011 – 2013 National Youth Icon awarded by the Ministry of Youth and Sports
- 2011 National Premier Youth Award (Extraordinary Achievement Category) awarded by the Ministry of Youth and Sports and presented by the Prime Minister of Malaysia, YAB Dato' Sri Najib Tun Razak
- 2009 Lions District 308-B1, District Governor's Distinguished Service Award awarded by the Lions Clubs International District 308B1, presented by the then District Governor Dr. JP Kamalanathan
- 2008 Great Women of Our Time Award (Education and Public Services) awarded by The Women's Weekly, presented by the Ke Bawah Duli Yang Teramat Mulia Tengku Puan Pahang Tunku Hajjah Azizah Aminah Maimunah Iskandariah Binti Al-Marhum Sultan Iskandar Al- Haj
- 2006 Selangor Youth Award (Volunteerism) awarded by the Ministry of Youth and Sports
- 2003 – Youth Ambassador on board the Ship of Southeast Asian Youths Program (SSEAYP)
