= Lwi Kian Keong =

Malaysian politician

Yang Berhormat Tuan Lwi Kian Keong MLA
- 雷健强

Member of the Selangor State Legislative Assembly for Sungai Pelek
- Incumbent
- Assumed office 12 August 2023
- Preceded by: Ronnie Liu Tian Khiew (PH–DAP)
- Majority: 1,458 (2023)

Personal details
- Born: Lwi Kian Keong; 9 August 1975 (age 50) Salak, Selangor, Malaysia
- Citizenship: Malaysian
- Party: Democratic Action Party (DAP)
- Other political affiliations: Pakatan Harapan (PH)
- Occupation: Politician

Lwi Kian Keong

Chinese name
- Traditional Chinese: 雷健強
- Simplified Chinese: 雷健强
Transcriptions
Standard Mandarin
- Hanyu Pinyin: Léi Jiànqiáng

Lwi Kian Keong (simplified Chinese: 雷健强; traditional Chinese: 雷健強; pinyin: Léi Jiànqiáng; born 9 August 1975) is a Malaysian politician who has served as Member of the Selangor State Legislative Assembly (MLA) for Sungai Pelek since August 2023. He is member of the Democratic Action Party (DAP), a component of the Pakatan Harapan (PH) coalition.

== Election results ==
Selangor State Legislative Assembly
Year	Constituency	Candidate	Votes	Pct	Opponent(s)	Votes	Pct	Ballots cast	Majority	Turnout
2023	N56 Sungai Pelek	Lwi Kian Keong (DAP)	17,984	51.77%	Suhaimi Mohd Ghazali (BERSATU)	16,526	47.57%	34,934	1,458	73.80%
2023	N56 Sungai Pelek	Lwi Kian Keong (DAP)	17,984	51.77%	Nageswaran Ravi (IND)	230	0.66%	34,934	1,458	73.80%
