= Hulu Rajang (federal constituency) =

Federal constituency of Sarawak, Malaysia

Hulu Rajang (P216)
Sarawak constituency

Federal constituency
- Legislature: Dewan Rakyat
- MP: Wilson Ugak Kumbong; GPS
- Constituency created: 1968
- First contested: 1969
- Last contested: 2022

Demographics
- Population (2020): 43,394
- Electors (2022): 43,438
- Area (km²): 34,080
- Pop. density (per km²): 1.3

Hulu Rajang is a federal constituency in Kapit (Bukit Mabong District, Kapit District & Belaga District) and Bintulu divisions (Tatau District & Sebauh District), Sarawak, Malaysia, that has been represented in the Dewan Rakyat since 1971.

The federal constituency was created in the 1968 redistribution and is mandated to return a single member to the Dewan Rakyat under the first past the post voting system.

Spanning an area of over 34,000 km^{2}, almost the size of the state of Pahang, Hulu Rajang is the largest parliamentary constituency in Malaysia. Consequently it also has the lowest population density, with only 1 person per sq km.

== Demographics ==
https://ge15.orientaldaily.com.my/seats/sarawak/p

Ethnic breakdown of Hulu Rajang's electorate as of 2022
1. Sarawak bumiputera (90.2%)
2. Chinese (4.80%)
3. Malay-Muslim bumiputera (3.70%)
4. Other ethnicities (1.30%)

As of 2020, Hulu Rajang has a population of 43,394 people.

Age breakdown of Hulu Rajang's electorate as of 2022
1. 18-20 (7.55%)
2. 21-29 (22.7%)
3. 30-39 (21.2%)
4. 40-49 (16.3%)
5. 50-59 (14.5%)
6. 60-69 (9.31%)
7. 70-79 (4.74%)
8. 80-89 (2.29%)
9. above 90 (1.39%)
Gender breakdown of Hulu Rajang's electorate as of 2022
1. Male (51.0%)
2. Female (49.0%)

== History ==
=== Polling districts ===
According to the gazette issued on 31 October 2022, the Hulu Rajang constituency has a total of 15 polling districts.

State constituency	Polling District	Code	Location
Baleh (N64)	Gaat	216/64/01	RH Lawan Ng.Ramong; RH Mengga Ng. Sepulay Gaat; SK Ng Balang; RH Nading Ng. Senetang; RH Sagen Sg.Gaat; RH Melintang Ng. Sebiru Sg. Gaat
Baleh (N64)	Mujong	216/64/02	RH Jos Sg.Mujong; RG Sengiang Sg. Mujong; SK Sg. Bebangan; RH Narok Sg . Bebangan; RH Umbar Sg. Tiau; RH James Saka; RH Sengiang Anak Usat, Wong Pantu; RH Peter Rantau Bidai; RH Gindal Pulau Sibau; RH Gawan Ng Aman; SK Mujong Tengah; SK Lubok Baya; SK Ng. Oyan; RH Bangkong Ng Sebola; RH Asun Anak Unggang Sg. Mujong; RH Mungko, Rantau Lelangai; SK Oyan Tengah; RH Unting Ng. Sekeroh
Baleh (N64)	Melinau	216/64/03	SK Sg. Tunoh; RH Killau Sg Melinau; RH Barang Sg pabg Melinau; RH Anding Sg. Melinau; RH Jala Sg. Melinau Kapit; RH Kalat Anak Manjah Sg. Majau; SK Lubok Mawang; RH Mansai Sg. Majau; RH Lugat Ng. Majau; RH Pioh Sg. Manjau; RH Berauh Ng Sebelanda, Sg Paku; RH Inguh Miut Sg. Paku; RH Jamba Sg. Paku; RH Jainting Ng. Sepinang; RH Nisson Sg. Paku
Baleh (N64)	Baleh	216/64/04	RH Kachin Sg. Tapang; RH Sait Ng. Puro Gaat; RH Nyamok Sg.Gaat; SK Lepong Gaat; RH Tajai Ng. Semirah Gaat; RH John Katil Kerangan Ara; RH Bidok Ng Sebetong; RH Gon, Ng Serian Baleh; RH Wong Ensong Ng. Sepata; RH Lamau Anak Jenggut, Telok Buing; RH Pinin Anak Tunjang Nanga Usun Baleh; RH Wong Telok Buing; RH Gare Anak Timbang Sg. Kain; RH Engsong Sg. Kain; SK Ng. Kain
Baleh (N64)	Merirai	216/64/05	RH Bigau Ujan Sg. Entuloh; RH Jack Sg. Entuloh; RH Richard (Unyat) Sg. Merirai; RH Goyang Apat Sg. Merirai; RH Bangau Undie Kerangan Laih; RH Jantai Anak Siba Batang Baleh; RH Bully Kerangan Besai Baleh; RII Sebuang Ng. Merama Baleh; Tadika KEMAS, Antawau; RH Tajai Sanggau Ng. Sebiro Baleh; SK Ng Sempili; RH Samon Anak Chepau; RH Itu Sg. Pulang Baleh; RH Bansa Anak Langga Sepulau Baleh; RH Sana Anak Rumpang Ng. Gaat
Belaga (N65)	Data Kakus	216/65/01	SMK Data Kakus
Belaga (N65)	Merit	216/65/02	SK Ng. Merit; RH Danggat Ng Mujan; RH Berundang Ng Ensawi; RH Guyang Ng Jeli; RH Entili Ng, Musa; RH Empang Ng Bilat Ulu Paku; RH Gendang Sg. Pila; RH Aji Ng. Ibun Pilla; RH Mero Lubok Dabai; RH Ranying Ulu Metah; RH Pillai Ng Metah; RH Setepan Ng Pila; SK Ng, Metah; RH Jamit Ng. Latap Pilla
Belaga (N65)	Ba	216/65/03	Uma Punan Biau; Uma Punan Sama; Uma Tanjong Lg. Pawah; SK Airport; Uma Sekapan Piit; Uma Balo Kesing Lg. Amo
Belaga (N65)	Belaga	216/65/04	SK Abun Matu; Uma Kahei Lg. Makero; Uma Aging Lg. Daah; Uma Lahanan Lg. Semuang; Uma Kejaman Neh Lg. Liten; Uma Apan Long Menjawah; Uma Nyaving Long Menjawah; SK. Lg. Segahan; Dewan UmaAging, Naha Jalei, Long Kebuho
Belaga (N65)	Long Busang	216/65/05	SK Long Busang
Belaga (N65)	Long Bangan	216/65/06	Uma Jangan Lg. Bangan
Belaga (N65)	Long Semutut	216/65/07	SK Uma Sambop; Long Nanyan
Murum (N66)	Long Murum	216/66/01	SK Metalun; RH Penan Long Peran; Dewan Serbaguna Long Wat; RH Penan Long Lidem; SK Lusong Laku; RH Penan Long Tanyit
Murum (N66)	Asap	216/66/02	SK Lg. Urun; RH Seping Long Bala; Uma Sping Lg. Koyan; Uma Kulit Daerah Kecil Asap; Uma Belor Daerah Kecil Asap; Uma Daro Daerah Kecil Asap; Uma Kelap Daerah Kecil Asap; Uma Lahanan Daerah Kecil Asap; Uma Nyaving Daerah Kecil Asap; Uma Bawang Daerah Kecil Asap; Uma Bakah Daerah Kecil Asap; Uma Balui Ukap Daerah Kecil Asap; Uma Lesong Daerah Kecil Asap; Uma Ukit Daerah Kecil Asap; Uma Juman Daerah Kecil Asap; Uma Penan Talun Daerah Kecil Asap; Uma Badang Daerah Kecil Asap
Murum (N66)	Tubau	216/66/03	SK Bukit Balai Tubau; RH Joshua Btg Tubau; RH Alip, Long Unan Tubau; RH Lasah Tuba Sg. Dusan Jelalong; RH Patrick Kebing Po; RH Augustine Lateng Saging Tubau; Tadika KEMAS RH Ballrully; RH lichong Sg. Sebutin; RH Jeranding Ulu Jelalong; RH Julaihi Ng. Sau; SK Kuala Kebulu; RH Malek Sg. Kebulu Jelalong

=== Representation history ===
Members of Parliament for Hulu Rajang
Parliament	No	Years	Member	Party	Vote Share
Constituency created
Ulu Rajang
		1969-1971	Parliament was suspended		
3rd	P140	1971-1973	Jugah Barieng	PESAKA	2,795; 41.38%
3rd	P140	1973-1974	Jugah Barieng	BN (PESAKA)	2,795; 41.38%
4th	P150	1974-1976	Sibat Miyut Tagong	SNAP	3,031; 44.72%
4th	P150	1976-1978	Sibat Miyut Tagong	BN (SNAP)	3,031; 44.72%
5th	P150	1978-1982	Sibat Miyut Tagong	BN (SNAP)	3,983; 69.91%
6th	P150	1982-1986	Justine Jinggot	BN (SNAP)	Uncontested
7th	P173	1986-1990	Justine Jinggot	BN (SNAP)	4,261; 49.44%
Hulu Rajang
8th	P176	1990-1995	Billy Abit Joo	Independent	5,393; 56.22%
9th	P188	1995-1999	Billy Abit Joo	BN (PRS)	6,731; 68.58%
10th	P189	1999-2004	Billy Abit Joo	BN (PRS)	6,884; 71.45%
11th	P215	2004-2008	Billy Abit Joo	BN (PRS)	6,949; 67.91%
12th	P216	2008-2013	Billy Abit Joo	BN (PRS)	6,590; 59.82%
13th	P216	2013-2018	Wilson Ugak Kumbong	BN (PRS)	9,117; 62.75%
14th	P216	2018	Wilson Ugak Kumbong	BN (PRS)	11,834; 68.20%
14th	P216	2018-2022	Wilson Ugak Kumbong	GPS (PRS)	11,834; 68.20%
15th	P216	2022–present	Wilson Ugak Kumbong	GPS (PRS)	15,456; 66.03%

=== State constituency ===
Parliamentary constituency	State constituency					
Parliamentary constituency	1969–1978	1978–1990	1990–1999	1999–2008	2008–2016	2016−present
Hulu Rajang			Baleh			
Hulu Rajang			Belaga			
Hulu Rajang						Murum
Ulu Rajang	Baleh					
Ulu Rajang	Belaga					

=== Historical boundaries ===
State Constituency	Area					
State Constituency	1968	1977	1987	1996	2005	2015
Baleh	Baleh; Long Singut; Merirai; Nanga Gaat; Nanga Majat					Baleh; Long Singut; Nanga Gaat; Nanga Majau; Nanga Sut
Belaga	Belaga; Data Kakus; Long Luar; Long Semutut; Murum					Belaga; Data Kakus; Long Busang; Long Semutut; Nanga Merit
Murum						Asap; Long Luar; Mentalun; Murum; Tubau

=== Current state assembly members ===
No.	State Constituency	Member	Party (coalition)
N64	Baleh	Nicholas Jantai Jemut	GPS (PRS)
N65	Belaga	Liwan Lagang	GPS (PRS)
N66	Murum	Chukpai Ugon	GPS (PRS)

=== Local governments & postcodes ===
No.	State Constituency	Local Government	Postcode
N64	Baleh	Kapit District Council	96800 Kapit; 96900 Belaga; 97100 Sebauh
N65	Belaga	Kapit District Council; Bintulu Development Authority (Data Kakus area)	96800 Kapit; 96900 Belaga; 97100 Sebauh
N66	Murum	Kapit District Council; Bintulu Development Authority (Tubau area)	96800 Kapit; 96900 Belaga; 97100 Sebauh

== Election results ==
Malaysian general election, 2022
Party	Candidate	Votes	%	∆%
GPS	Wilson Ugak Kumbong	15,456	66.03	▲66.03
PH	Abun Sui Anyit	7,951	33.97	▲9.20
Total valid votes		23,407	100.00	
Total rejected ballots		311		
Unreturned ballots		89		
Turnout		23,807	53.89	▼10.52
Registered electors		43,438		
Majority		7,505	32.06	▼4.33
GPS gain from BN		Swing		?
Source(s) https://lom.agc.gov.my/ilims/upload/portal/akta/outputp/1753265/PARLIMEN%20SARAWAK%20(PUB%20620).pdf

Malaysian general election, 2018
Party	Candidate	Votes	%	∆%
BN	Wilson Ugak Kumbong	11,834	68.20	▲5.45
PKR	Abun Sui Anyit	5,519	31.80	▲31.80
Total valid votes		17,353	100.00	
Total rejected ballots		306		
Unreturned ballots		68		
Turnout		17,727	64.41	▼3.67
Registered electors		27,520		
Majority		6,315	36.39	▼3.76
BN hold		Swing		
Source(s) "His Majesty's Government Gazette - Notice of Contested Election, Parliament for the State of Sarawak [P.U. (B) 247/2018]" (PDF). Attorney General's Chambers of Malaysia. 3 May 2018. "Federal Government Gazette - Results of Contested Election and Statements of the Poll after the Official Addition of Votes, Parliamentary Constituencies for the State of Sarawak [P.U. (B) 321/2018]" (PDF). Attorney General's Chambers of Malaysia. 28 May 2018. Archived from the original (PDF) on 2019-12-29.

Malaysian general election, 2013
Party	Candidate	Votes	%	∆%
BN	Wilson Ugak Kumbong	9,117	62.75	▲2.93
PKR	Abun Sui Anyit	3,283	22.60	▲22.60
Sarawak Workers Party	George Lagong	2,129	14.65	▲14.65
Total valid votes		14,529	100.00	
Total rejected ballots		213		
Unreturned ballots		21		
Turnout		14,763	68.08	▲4.99
Registered electors		21,686		
Majority		5,834	40.15	▲20.51
BN hold		Swing		
Source(s) "Federal Government Gazette - Notice of Contested Election, Parliament for the State of Sarawak [P.U. (B) 184/2013]" (PDF). Attorney General's Chambers of Malaysia. 26 April 2013. Archived from the original (PDF) on 2018-09-30. "Federal Government Gazette - Results of Contested Election and Statements of the Poll after the Official Addition of Votes, Parliamentary Constituencies for the State of Sarawak [P.U. (B) 225/2013]" (PDF). Attorney General's Chambers of Malaysia. 22 May 2013. Archived from the original (PDF) on 2018-09-30.

Malaysian general election, 2008
Party	Candidate	Votes	%	∆%
BN	Billy Abit Joo	6,590	59.82	▼8.09
Independent	George Lagong	4,426	40.18	▲40.18
Total valid votes		11,016	100.00	
Total rejected ballots		139		
Unreturned ballots		9		
Turnout		11,164	63.09	▲2.48
Registered electors		17,696		
Majority		2,164	19.64	▼16.18
BN hold		Swing		

Malaysian general election, 2004
Party	Candidate	Votes	%	∆%
BN	Billy Abit Joo	6,949	67.91	▼3.54
SNAP	Bendindang Manjah	3,283	32.09	▲32.09
Total valid votes		10,232	100.00	
Total rejected ballots		171		
Unreturned ballots		13		
Turnout		10,416	60.61	▼1.05
Registered electors		17,185		
Majority		3,666	35.82	▼7.08
BN hold		Swing		

Malaysian general election, 1999
Party	Candidate	Votes	%	∆%
BN	Billy Abit Joo	6,884	71.45	▲2.87
Independent	Kumbong Langit	2,751	28.55	▲28.55
Total valid votes		9,635	100.00	
Total rejected ballots		232		
Unreturned ballots		11		
Turnout		9,878	61.66	▼2.14
Registered electors		16,018		
Majority		4,133	42.90	▲5.74
BN hold		Swing		

Malaysian general election, 1995
Party	Candidate	Votes	%	∆%
BN	Billy Abit Joo	6,731	68.58	▲12.36
Independent	Lucius Jimbon	3,084	31.42	▲31.42
Total valid votes		9,815	100.00	
Total rejected ballots		274		
Unreturned ballots		22		
Turnout		10,111	63.80	▼6.95
Registered electors		15,849		
Majority		3,647	37.16	▲24.72
BN gain from Independent		Swing		?

Malaysian general election, 1990
Party	Candidate	Votes	%	∆%
Independent	Billy Abit Joo	5,393	56.22	▲56.22
BN	Justine Jinggut	4,200	43.78	▼5.66
Total valid votes		9,593	100.00	
Total rejected ballots		315		
Unreturned ballots		0		
Turnout		9,908	70.75	▲7.65
Registered electors		14,004		
Majority		1,193	12.44	▼8.95
BN hold		Swing		

Malaysian general election, 1986: Ulu Rajang
Party	Candidate	Votes	%	∆%
BN	Justine Jinggot	4,261	49.44	▲49.44
Independent	Ugak Kumbong	2,417	28.05	▲28.05
Independent	Simon Temenggong Sibat	1,940	22.51	▲22.51
Total valid votes		8,618	100.00	
Total rejected ballots		355		
Unreturned ballots		0		
Turnout		8,973	63.10	
Registered electors		14,220		
Majority		1,844	21.39	
BN hold		Swing		

Malaysian general election, 1982: Ulu Rajang
Party	Candidate	Votes	%	∆%
On the nomination day, Justine Jinggot won uncontested.
BN	Justine Jinggot			
Total valid votes			100.00	
Total rejected ballots				
Unreturned ballots				
Turnout				
Registered electors		12,476		
Majority				
BN hold		Swing		

Malaysian general election, 1978: Ulu Rajang
Party	Candidate	Votes	%	∆%
BN	Sibat Miyut Tagong	3,983	69.91	▲26.57
Parti Anak Jati Sarawak	Manjah Dengah	1,246	30.09	▲30.09
Total valid votes		5,697	100.00	
Total rejected ballots		672		
Unreturned ballots		0		
Turnout		6,369	55.94	▼15.04
Registered electors		11,385		
Majority		2,737	39.82	▲38.44
BN gain		Swing		

Malaysian general election, 1974: Ulu Rajang
Party	Candidate	Votes	%	∆%
SNAP	Sibat Miyut Tagong	3,031	44.72	▲23.58
BN	Leonard Linggi Jugah	2,937	43.34	▲43.34
Independent	Manjah Dengeh	809	11.93	▲11.93
Total valid votes		6,777	100.00	
Total rejected ballots		962		
Unreturned ballots		0		
Turnout		7,739	70.98	▼7.39
Registered electors		10,903		
Majority		94	1.38	▼18.86
SNAP gain from PESAKA		Swing		?

Malaysian general election, 1969: Ulu Rajang
Party	Candidate	Votes	%
PESAKA	Jugah Barieng	2,795	41.38
SNAP	Sibat Miyut Tagong	1,428	21.14
SUPP	Rabong Langgot	1,424	21.08
Independent	Kupa Kanyan	1,107	16.39
Total valid votes		6,754	100.00
Total rejected ballots		643	
Unreturned ballots		0	
Turnout		7,397	78.37
Registered electors		9,439	
Majority		1,367	20.24
This was a new constituency created.
