= Wilson Ugak Kumbong =

Malaysian politician

Yang Berhormat Datuk Wilson Ugak Kumbong PJN KMN PBS MP
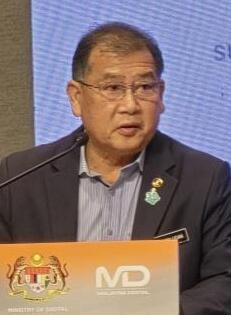
- Wilson Ugak Kumbong in 2024

Deputy Minister of Digital
- Incumbent
- Assumed office 12 December 2023
- Monarchs: Abdullah (2023–2024); Ibrahim Iskandar (since 2024)
- Prime Minister: Anwar Ibrahim
- Minister: Gobind Singh Deo
- Preceded by: Teo Nie Ching (Deputy Minister of Communications and Digital)
- Constituency: Hulu Rajang

Deputy Minister in the Prime Minister's Department (Sabah and Sarawak Affairs and Special Duties)
- In office 10 December 2022 – 12 December 2023
- Monarch: Abdullah
- Prime Minister: Anwar Ibrahim
- Minister: Armizan Mohd Ali
- Preceded by: Hanifah Hajar Taib (Sabah and Sarawak Affairs); Mastura Mohd Yazid (Special Duties)
- Succeeded by: Position abolished
- Constituency: Hulu Rajang

Chairman of the National Institute of Occupational Safety and Health
- In office 10 April 2020 – 10 December 2022
- Minister: Saravanan Murugan (2020–2022); V. Sivakumar (3–10 December 2022)
- Preceded by: Alice Lau Kiong Yeng
- Succeeded by: Chong Chieng Jen

Member of the Malaysian Parliament for Hulu Rajang
- Incumbent
- Assumed office 5 May 2013
- Preceded by: Billy Abit Joo (BN–PRS)
- Majority: 5,834 (2013); 6,315 (2018); 7,505 (2022)

Faction represented in Dewan Rakyat
- 2013–2018: Barisan Nasional
- 2018–present: Gabungan Parti Sarawak

Personal details
- Born: 24 April 1962 (age 64) Sibu, Crown Colony of Sarawak
- Party: Parti Rakyat Sarawak
- Other political affiliations: Barisan Nasional (until 2018); Gabungan Parti Sarawak (since 2018)
- Occupation: Politician

Wilson Ugak anak Kumbong (born 24 April 1962) is a Malaysian politician who has served as the Deputy Minister of Digital in the Unity Government administration under Prime Minister Anwar Ibrahim and Minister Gobind Singh Deo since December 2023 and the Member of Parliament (MP) for Hulu Rajang since May 2013. He served as the Deputy Minister in the Prime Minister's Department in charge of Sabah and Sarawak Affairs and Special Duties in the PH administration under Prime Minister Anwar and Minister Armizan Mohd Ali from December 2022 to December 2023 and Chairman of the Chairman of the National Institute of Occupational Safety and Health (NIOSH) from April 2020 to his appointment as a deputy minister in December 2022. He is a member and Vice President of the Parti Rakyat Sarawak (PRS), a component party of the Gabungan Parti Sarawak (GPS) coalition and formerly Barisan Nasional (BN) coalition. He is also the cousin of Alexander Nanta Linggi, the Minister of Works and MP for Kapit.

Kumbong first contested and won the Hulu Rajang seat at the 2013 general election. He retained the seat in both the 2018 and 2022 general elections, defeating Abun Sui Anyit from the People's Justice Party (PKR), a component party of then Pakatan Rakyat (PR) and PH opposition coalitions in all three elections and George Lagong from the Sarawak Workers Party (SWP) in 2013. He was appointed as Chairman of NIOSH by the then Prime Minister Muhyiddin Yassin in April 2020, replacing Alice Lau Kiong Yieng from the Democratic Action Party (DAP), another component party of then PH opposition coalition. He is the first Chairman of NIOSH of Iban ethnicity. He was appointed as Deputy Minister in the Prime Minister's Department in charge of Sabah and Sarawak Affairs by Prime Minister Anwar in December 2022, deputising for Minister Armizan Mohd Ali.

== Election results ==
Parliament of Malaysia
Year	Constituency	Candidate	Votes	Pct	Opponent(s)	Votes	Pct	Ballots cast	Majority	Turnout
2013	P216 Hulu Rajang	Wilson Ugak Kumbong (PRS)	9,117	62.75%	Abun Sui Anyit (PKR)	3,283	22.60%	14,763	5,834	68.08%
2013	P216 Hulu Rajang	Wilson Ugak Kumbong (PRS)	9,117	62.75%	George Lagong (SWP)	685	1.05%	14,763	5,834	68.08%
2018	P216 Hulu Rajang	Wilson Ugak Kumbong (PRS)	11,834	68.20%	Abun Sui Anyit (PKR)	5,519	31.80%	17,727	6,315	64.41%
2022	P216 Hulu Rajang	Wilson Ugak Kumbong (PRS)	15,456	66.03%	Abun Sui Anyit (PKR)	7,951	33.97%	23,807	7,505	53.89%

== Honours ==
=== Honours of Malaysia ===
- Malaysia
  - Commander of the Order of Meritorious Service (PJN) – Datuk (2015)
  - Officer of the Order of the Defender of the Realm (KMN) (2010)
  - Recipient of the 17th Yang di-Pertuan Agong Installation Medal (2024)
- Sarawak
  - Officer of the Most Exalted Order of the Star of Sarawak (PBS) (2009)
  - Gold Medal of the Sarawak Independence Diamond Jubilee Medal (2024)
