= Billy Abit Joo =

Malaysian politician

Yang Berbahagia Datuk Billy Abit Joo PJN KMN

Member of the Malaysian Parliament for Hulu Rajang, Sarawak
- In office 1990 – 5 May 2013
- Preceded by: Justine Jinggot (SNAP)
- Succeeded by: Wilson Ugak Kumbong (PRS)
- Majority: 1,193 (1990); 3,647 (1995); 4,133 (1999); 3,666 (2004); 2,164 (2008)

Personal details
- Born: 10 May 1949 (age 76) Crown Colony of Sarawak
- Party: PRS
- Other political affiliations: Barisan Nasional (BN); Gabungan Parti Sarawak (GPS) (2018–)
- Occupation: Politician

Billy Abit Joo (born 10 May 1949) was the Member of the Parliament of Malaysia for the Hulu Rajang constituency in Sarawak from 1990 to 2013.

Billy Abit entered Parliament in the 1990 election, running as an independent. He later joined the Sarawak People's Party (PRS) in the Barisan Nasional coalition. His rural constituency was the largest by area in Malaysia. In 2009, he led a parliamentary delegation into the constituency to enquire into living conditions of the Penan people. He has called for the establishment of forest reserves for the Penans. In 2008, he crossed party lines to be the only government MP to sign a petition for the review of Malaysia's Internal Security Act.

Billy Abit's parliamentary career came to an end at the 2013 election, when the PRS nominated Wilson Ugak Kumbong to contest Hulu Rajang.

== Election results ==
Parliament of Malaysia
Year	Constituency	Candidate	Votes	Pct	Opponent(s)	Votes	Pct	Ballots cast	Majority	Turnout
1990	P176 Hulu Rajang	Billy Abit Joo (IND)	5,393	56.22%	Justine Jinggut (SNAP)	4,200	43.78%	9,908	1,193	70.75%
1995	P188 Hulu Rajang	Billy Abit Joo (PRS)	6,731	68.58%	Lucius Jimbun (IND)	3,084	31.42%	10,111	3,647	63.80%
1999	P189 Hulu Rajang	Billy Abit Joo (PRS)	6,884	71.45%	Kumbong Langit (IND)	2,751	28.55%	9,878	4,133	61.66%
2004	P215 Hulu Rajang	Billy Abit Joo (PRS)	6,949	67.91%	Bendindang Manjah (SNAP)	3,283	32.09%	10,416	3,666	60.61%
2008	P216 Hulu Rajang	Billy Abit Joo (PRS)	6,590	59.82%	George Lagong (IND)	4,426	40.18%	11,164	2,164	63.09%

== Honours ==
- Malaysia
  - Commander of the Order of Meritorious Service (PJN) – Datuk (2008)
  - Officer of the Order of the Defender of the Realm (KMN) (1998)
