= Pandamaran (state constituency) =

State constituency in Selangor, Malaysia

Pandamaran (N47)
Selangor constituency

State constituency
- Legislature: Selangor State Legislative Assembly
MLA
Tony Leong Tuck Chee
PH
- Constituency created: 1984
- Constituency abolished: 1995
- Constituency re-created: 2004
- First contested: 1986
- Last contested: 2023

Demographics
- Electors (2023): 75,777

Pandamaran is a state constituency in Selangor, Malaysia, that has been represented in the Selangor State Legislative Assembly from 1984 to 1995, from 2004 to present.

The state constituency was created in the 1984 redistribution and is mandated to return a single member to the Selangor State Legislative Assembly under the first past the post voting system.

== Demographics ==
Ethnic breakdown of Pandamaran's electorate as of 2023
1. Chinese (59.4%)
2. Indian (22.6%)
3. Malay (15.3%)
4. Other ethnicities (3.10%)

== History ==
It was abolished in 1995 when it was redistributed. It was re-created in 2004.

According to the federal gazette issued on 30 March 2018, the Pandamaran constituency is divided into 23 polling districts.

| State conatituency | Polling district | Code | Location |
|---|---|---|---|
| Pandamaran（N47） | Kompleks Sukan Pandamaran | 110/47/01 | SMK (P) Raja Zarina |
| Pandamaran（N47） | Kawasan Sekolah Cina 'B' | 110/47/02 | SJK (C) Pandamaran B |
| Pandamaran（N47） | Kawasan Sekolah Cina 'A' | 110/47/03 | SJK (C) Pandamaran A |
| Pandamaran（N47） | Pandamaran | 110/47/04 | SMK Tengku Ampuan Jemaah |
| Pandamaran（N47） | Jalan Tengku Badar Utara | 110/47/05 | SK St Anne's Convent |
| Pandamaran（N47） | Jalan Tengku Badar Selatan | 110/47/06 | SJK (C) Tshing Nian |
| Pandamaran（N47） | Jalan Kastam | 110/47/07 | SK Methodist |
| Pandamaran（N47） | Tengku Bendahara Azman | 110/47/08 | SK (1) Tengku Bendahara Azman; SK (2) Tengku Bendahara Azman |
| Pandamaran（N47） | Raja Lumu | 110/47/09 | SMK Raja Lumu |
| Pandamaran（N47） | Sungai Aur | 110/47/10 | SJK (T) Persiaran Raja Muda Musa (Jalan Watson) |
| Pandamaran（N47） | Teluk Pulai Utara | 110/47/11 | SK (P) Methodist |
| Pandamaran（N47） | Kampung Attap | 110/47/12 | SMK Perempuan Methodist |
| Pandamaran（N47） | Jalan Tengku Kelana | 110/47/13 | SMK Convent Klang |
| Pandamaran（N47） | Bukit Istana | 110/47/14 | SK Klang |
| Pandamaran（N47） | Simpang Tujuh | 110/47/15 | SM Hin Hua |
| Pandamaran（N47） | Taman Gembira 1 | 110/47/16 | SK Taman Gembira |
| Pandamaran（N47） | Taman Selatan 1 | 110/47/17 | SK (1) Simpang Lima; SK (2) Simpang Lima |
| Pandamaran（N47） | Teluk Gadung Besar | 110/47/18 | SMK Tengku Ampuan Rahimah |
| Pandamaran（N47） | Taman Chi Liung | 110/47/19 | SRA Taman Sri Andalas |
| Pandamaran（N47） | Teluk Pulai Selatan | 110/47/20 | SMK Methodist (ACS) |
| Pandamaran（N47） | Taman Selatan 2 | 110/47/21 | Sekolah Khas Klang |
| Pandamaran（N47） | Taman Bayu Perdana | 110/47/22 | Kolej Vokasional Klang (SMT Klang) |
| Pandamaran（N47） | Taman Gembira 2 | 110/47/23 | SA Rakyat KAFA Integrasi Nurul-Ain |

=== Representation history ===
Members of the Legislative Assembly for Pandamaran
| Assembly | No | Years | Member | Party |
Constituency created from Selat Kelang
| 7th | N36 | 1986-1990 | Ng Thian Hock (黃天福) | BN (MCA) |
| 8th | N36 | 1990-1995 | Tai Chang Eng @ Teh Chang Ying (郑灿英) | BN (MCA) |
Constituency abolished, split into Pelabuhan Klang and Sijangkang
Constituency re-created from Pelabuhan Klang and Bandar Klang
| 11th | N47 | 2004-2008 | Teh Kim Poo (郑敬保) | BN (MCA) |
| 12th | N47 | 2008-2013 | Ronnie Liu Tian Khiew (刘天球) | PR (DAP) |
| 13th | N47 | 2013-2018 | Eric Tan Pok Shyong (陈博雄) | PR (DAP) |
| 14th | N47 | 2018–2023 | Tony Leong Tuck Chee (梁德志) | PH (DAP) |
| 15th | N47 | 2023–present | Tony Leong Tuck Chee (梁德志) | PH (DAP) |

== Election results ==
Selangor state election, 2023
| Party | Candidate | Votes | % | ∆% |
|---|---|---|---|---|
| PH | Tony Leong Tuck Chee | 46,999 | 86.75 | ▲1.43 |
| PN | Gunalan Balakrishnan | 6,701 | 12.37 | ▲12.37 |
| Parti Rakyat Malaysia | Tan Kang Yap | 479 | 0.88 | ▲0.88 |
| Total valid votes | | 54,179 | 100.00 | |
| Total rejected ballots | | 258 | | |
| Unreturned ballots | | 51 | | |
| Turnout | | 54,488 | 71.91 | ▼13.45 |
| Registered electors | | 75,777 | | |
| Majority | | 40,298 | 74.38 | ▲0.74 |
| PH hold | | Swing | | |

Selangor state election, 2018
| Party | Candidate | Votes | % | ∆% |
|---|---|---|---|---|
| PKR | Tony Leong Tuck Chee | 41,552 | 85.32 | ▲85.32 |
| BN | Tee Hooi Ling | 5,689 | 11.68 | ▼18.40 |
| PAS | Santokh Singh Gurdev Singh | 1,459 | 3.00 | ▲3.00 |
| Total valid votes | | 48,700 | 100.00 | |
| Total rejected ballots | | 303 | | |
| Unreturned ballots | | 99 | | |
| Turnout | | 49,102 | 85.36 | ▼2.04 |
| Registered electors | | 57,522 | | |
| Majority | | 35,863 | 73.64 | ▲34.97 |
| PKR hold | | Swing | | |

Selangor state election, 2013
| Party | Candidate | Votes | % | ∆% |
|---|---|---|---|---|
| DAP | Eric Tan Pok Shyong | 16,311 | 68.75 | ▲5.05 |
| BN | Ching Eu Boon | 7,135 | 30.08 | ▼6.22 |
| Independent | Hamzah Lamin | 216 | 0.91 | ▲0.91 |
| Independent | Deligannu Allagan | 62 | 0.26 | ▲0.26 |
| Total valid votes | | 23,724 | 100.00 | |
| Total rejected ballots | | 365 | | |
| Unreturned ballots | | 29 | | |
| Turnout | | 24,118 | 87.40 | ▲7.87 |
| Registered electors | | 27,594 | | |
| Majority | | 9,176 | 38.67 | ▲11.27 |
| DAP hold | | Swing | | |
Source(s) "Federal Government Gazette - Notice of Contested Election, State Legislative Assembly for the State of Selangor [P.U. (B) 192/2013]" (PDF). Attorney General's Chambers of Malaysia. 26 April 2013. Archived from the original (PDF) on 29 December 2019. "Federal Government Gazette - Results of Contested Election and Statements of the Poll after the Official Addition of Votes, State Constituencies for the State of Selangor [P.U. (B) 233/2013]" (PDF). Attorney General's Chambers of Malaysia. 22 May 2013. Archived from the original (PDF) on 2 October 2018.

Selangor state election, 2008
| Party | Candidate | Votes | % | ∆% |
|---|---|---|---|---|
| DAP | Ronnie Liu Tian Khiew | 12,547 | 63.70 | ▲14.91 |
| BN | Teh Kim Poo | 7,149 | 36.30 | ▼14.91 |
| Total valid votes | | 19,696 | 100.00 | |
| Total rejected ballots | | 319 | | |
| Unreturned ballots | | 19 | | |
| Turnout | | 20,034 | 79.53 | ▲7.30 |
| Registered electors | | 25,192 | | |
| Majority | | 5,398 | 27.40 | ▲24.98 |
| DAP gain from BN | | Swing | | ? |

Selangor state election, 2004
| Party | Candidate | Votes | % | ∆% |
|---|---|---|---|---|
| BN | Teh Kim Poo | 9,104 | 51.21 | |
| DAP | Tee Boon Hock | 8,673 | 48.79 | |
| Total valid votes | | 17,777 | 100.00 | |
| Total rejected ballots | | 364 | | |
| Unreturned ballots | | 6 | | |
| Turnout | | 18,147 | 72.23 | |
| Registered electors | | 25,123 | | |
| Majority | | 431 | 2.42 | |
| BN hold | | Swing | | |

Selangor state election, 1990
| Party | Candidate | Votes | % | ∆% |
|---|---|---|---|---|
| BN | Tai Chang Eng @ Teh Chang Ying | 10,030 | 51.82 | ▼12.99 |
| DAP | Deligannu Allagan | 8,616 | 44.52 | ▲12.99 |
| Independent | Ramli Moid | 709 | 3.66 | |
| Total valid votes | | 19,355 | 100.00 | |
| Total rejected ballots | | 462 | | |
| Unreturned ballots | | 0 | | |
| Turnout | | 19,817 | 65.46 | ▼5.76 |
| Registered electors | | 30,274 | | |
| Majority | | 1,414 | 7.30 | ▼22.32 |
| BN hold | | Swing | | |

Selangor state election, 1986
| Party | Candidate | Votes | % |
|---|---|---|---|
| BN | Ng Thian Hock | 10,197 | 64.81 |
| DAP | P. A. Nathan | 5,537 | 35.19 |
| Total valid votes | | 15,734 | 100.00 |
| Total rejected ballots | | 638 | |
| Unreturned ballots | | 0 | |
| Turnout | | 16,372 | 71.22 |
| Registered electors | | 22,988 | |
| Majority | | 4,660 | 29.62 |
This was a new constituency created.
