= Sungai Pelek (state constituency) =

Malaysian state constituency

Sungai Pelek (N56)
Selangor constituency

State constituency
- Legislature: Selangor State Legislative Assembly
MLA
Lwi Kian Keong
PH
- Constituency created: 1974
- First contested: 1974
- Last contested: 2023

Demographics
- Electors (2023): 47,335

Sungai Pelek is a state constituency in Selangor, Malaysia, that has been represented in the Selangor State Legislative Assembly since 1974.

The state constituency was created in the 1974 redistribution and is mandated to return a single member to the Selangor State Legislative Assembly under the first past the post voting system.

== Demographics ==
Ethnic breakdown of Sungai Pelek's electorate as of 2023
1. Malay (56.8%)
2. Chinese (22.6%)
3. Indian (17.6%)
4. Other ethnicities (3.02%)

== History ==
=== Polling districts ===
According to the federal gazette issued on 30 March 2018, the Sungai Pelek constituency is divided into 14 polling districts.

State constituency	Polling Districts	Code	Location
Sungai Pelek（N56）	Jenderam Hulu	113/56/01	SK Jenderam
Sungai Pelek（N56）	Salak	113/56/02	SK Salak
Sungai Pelek（N56）	Salak Jijan	113/56/03	SJK (C) Chio Chiao
Sungai Pelek（N56）	Lothian Timur	113/56/04	SJK (T) Ladang Bute
Sungai Pelek（N56）	Sepang Utara	113/56/05	SJK (C) Sepang
Sungai Pelek（N56）	Sepang Selatan	113/56/06	SJK (T) Sepang
Sungai Pelek（N56）	Hulu Cucuh	113/56/07	Dewan Orang Ramai Kampung Ulu Chucoh
Sungai Pelek（N56）	Bagan Lalang	113/56/08	SMK Pantai Sepang Putra
Sungai Pelek（N56）	Sungai Pelek Tiga	113/56/09	SMK Sungai Pelek
Sungai Pelek（N56）	Sungai Pelek Dua	113/56/10	SJK (C) Wah Lian
Sungai Pelek（N56）	Sungai Pelek Empat	113/56/11	SK Sungai Pelek
Sungai Pelek（N56）	Bandar Baru Salak Tinggi	113/56/12	SK Bandar Baru Salak Tinggi
Sungai Pelek（N56）	Taman Seroja	113/56/13	SK Taman Seroja
Sungai Pelek（N56）	Taman Mawar	113/56/14	SK KLIA

=== Representation history ===
Members of the Legislative Assembly for Sungai Pelek
Assembly	No	Years	Member	Party
Constituency created from Dengkil and Sungei Rawang
Sungei Pelek
4th	N32	1974-1978	Lim Tuan Siong (林端祥)	BN (MCA)
5th	N32	1978-1982	Choo Yong Fatt (曹勇发)	BN (MCA)
6th	N32	1982-1986	Ng Soon Por @ Ng Ah Hock (黃顺坡/黃顺波)	BN (MCA)
Sungai Pelik
7th	N41	1986-1990	Ng Soon Por @ Ng Ah Hock (黃顺坡/黃顺波)	BN (MCA)
8th	N41	1990-1995	Ng Soon Por @ Ng Ah Hock (黃顺坡/黃顺波)	BN (MCA)
Sungai Pelek
9th	N48	1995-1999	Liew Chee Khong @ Liew Chee Choong (刘志強)	BN (MCA)
10th	N48	1999-2004	Liew Chee Khong @ Liew Chee Choong (刘志強)	BN (MCA)
11th	N56	2004-2008	Liew Chee Khong @ Liew Chee Choong (刘志強)	BN (MCA)
12th	N56	2008-2013	Yap Ee Wah (叶怡华)	BN (MCA)
13th	N56	2013-2018	Lai Nyuk Lan (赖玉兰)	PR (DAP)
14th	N56	2018-2023	Ronnie Liu Tian Khiew (刘天球)	PH (DAP)
15th	N56	2023–present	Lwi Kian Keong (雷健强)	PH (DAP)

== Election results ==
Selangor state election, 2023
Party	Candidate	Votes	%	∆%
PH	Lwi Kian Keong	17,984	51.77	▼0.78
PN	Suhaimi Mohd Ghazali	16,526	47.57	▲47.57
Independent	Nageswaran Ravi	230	0.66	▲0.66
Total valid votes		34,740	100.00	
Total rejected ballots		194		
Unreturned ballots		40		
Turnout		34,974	73.89	▼13.81
Registered electors		47,335		
Majority		1,458	4.20	▼21.47
PH hold		Swing		

Selangor state election, 2018
Party	Candidate	Votes	%	∆%
PKR	Ronnie Liu Tian Khiew	13,484	52.55	▲52.55
BN	Ng Chok Sin	6,898	26.88	▼16.91
PAS	Rohaya Mohd Shahir	5,200	20.26	▲20.26
People's Alternative Party	Harry Arul Raj Krishnan	79	0.31	▲0.31
Total valid votes		25,661	100.00	
Total rejected ballots		296		
Unreturned ballots		152		
Turnout		26,109	87.70	▼0.94
Registered electors		29,770		
Majority		6,586	25.67	▲16.11
PKR hold		Swing		

Selangor state election, 2013
Party	Candidate	Votes	%	∆%
DAP	Lai Nyuk Lan	10,997	53.35	▲12.29
BN	Ng Chok Sin	9,025	43.79	▼9.04
KITA	Zakaria Mohd Mukhtar	430	2.09	▲2.09
Independent	Ab Manap Sahardin	160	0.78	▼5.33
Total valid votes		20,612	100.00	
Total rejected ballots		399		
Unreturned ballots		39		
Turnout		21,050	88.64	▲11.20
Registered electors		23,749		
Majority		1,972	9.56	▲7.79
DAP gain from BN		Swing		?
Source(s) "Federal Government Gazette - Notice of Contested Election, State Legislative Assembly for the State of Selangor [P.U. (B) 192/2013]" (PDF). Attorney General's Chambers of Malaysia. 26 April 2013. "Federal Government Gazette - Results of Contested Election and Statements of the Poll after the Official Addition of Votes, State Constituencies for the State of Selangor [P.U. (B) 233/2013]" (PDF). Attorney General's Chambers of Malaysia. 22 May 2013.

Selangor state election, 2008
Party	Candidate	Votes	%	∆%
BN	Yap Ee Wah	7,053	52.83	▼14.79
DAP	Sivananthan Arumugam	5,481	41.06	▲8.78
Independent	Ab Manap Sahardin	816	6.11	▲6.11
Total valid votes		13,350	100.00	
Total rejected ballots		431		
Unreturned ballots		77		
Turnout		13,858	77.44	▲3.64
Registered electors		17,895		
Majority		1,572	1.77	▼53.67
BN hold		Swing		

Selangor state election, 2004
Party	Candidate	Votes	%	∆%
BN	Liew Chee Khong @ Liew Chee Choong	7,847	67.72	▲5.05
DAP	Cheong Kai Cheng	3,740	32.28	▼5.05
Total valid votes		11,587	100.00	
Total rejected ballots		515		
Unreturned ballots		64		
Turnout		12,166	73.80	▲2.67
Registered electors		16,485		
Majority		4,107	65.44	▲40.50
BN hold		Swing		

Selangor state election, 1999
Party	Candidate	Votes	%	∆%
BN	Liew Chee Khong @ Liew Chee Choong	7,126	62.67	▼11.83
DAP	Titus Gladwyn S. G. Gomez	4,244	37.33	▲11.83
Total valid votes		11,370	100.00	
Total rejected ballots		511		
Unreturned ballots		14		
Turnout		11,895	71.13	▲0.12
Registered electors		16,724		
Majority		2,882	24.94	▼24.06
BN hold		Swing		

Selangor state election, 1995
Party	Candidate	Votes	%	∆%
BN	Liew Chee Khong @ Liew Chee Choong	8,022	74.50	▲11.65
DAP	Hairuddin Jantan	2,746	25.50	▼11.65
Total valid votes		10,768	100.00	
Total rejected ballots		472		
Unreturned ballots		62		
Turnout		11,302	71.01	▼4.00
Registered electors		15,917		
Majority		5,276	49.00	▲23.30
BN hold		Swing		

Selangor state election, 1990: Sungai Pelik
Party	Candidate	Votes	%	∆%
BN	Ng Soon Por @ Ng Ah Hock	6,918	62.85	▼5.73
DAP	Wong Chuan How	4,090	37.15	▲5.73
Total valid votes		11,008	100.00	
Total rejected ballots		482		
Unreturned ballots		0		
Turnout		11,490	75.01	▲0.66
Registered electors		15,317		
Majority		2,828	25.70	▼11.46
BN hold		Swing		

Selangor state election, 1986: Sungai Pelik
Party	Candidate	Votes	%	∆%
BN	Ng Soon Por @ Ng Ah Hock	6,540	68.58	▼3.11
DAP	Ean Yong Tin Sin	2,997	31.42	▲7.75
Total valid votes		9,537	100.00	
Total rejected ballots		395		
Unreturned ballots		0		
Turnout		9,932	74.35	▼6.45
Registered electors		13,358		
Majority		3,543	37.16	▼10.78
BN hold		Swing		

Selangor state election, 1982: Sungei Pelek
Party	Candidate	Votes	%	∆%
BN	Ng Soon Por @ Ng Ah Hock	6,528	71.61	▼4.20
DAP	Tan Kok Wai	2,158	23.67	▲23.67
PAS	Daud Jantan	430	4.72	▼19.47
Total valid votes		9,116	100.00	
Total rejected ballots		146		
Unreturned ballots		0		
Turnout		9,262	80.80	
Registered electors		11,463		
Majority		4,370	47.94	▼3.68
BN hold		Swing		

Selangor state election, 1978: Sungei Pelek
Party	Candidate	Votes	%	∆%
BN	Choo Yoong Fatt	5,545	75.81	▲25.23
PAS	Atan Bulat	1,769	24.19	▲24.19
Total valid votes		7,314	100.00	
Total rejected ballots		552		
Unreturned ballots		0		
Turnout		7,866	79.68	▼3.05
Registered electors		9,872		
Majority		3,776	51.63	▲44.39
BN hold		Swing		

Selangor state election, 1974: Sungei Pelek
Party	Candidate	Votes	%
BN	Lim Tuan Siong	3,201	50.58
Independent	Ng Kin Chuan	2,743	43.34
DAP	Tai Sin Tiau	385	6.08
Total valid votes		6,329	100.00
Total rejected ballots		397	
Unreturned ballots		0	
Turnout		6,726	87.33
Registered electors		7,702	
Majority		458	7.24
This was a new constituency created.
