= Gobind Singh Deo =

Malaysian politician and lawyer

Yang Berhormat Tuan Gobind Singh Deo MP
- ਗੋਬਿੰਦ ਸਿੰਘ ਦਿਓ
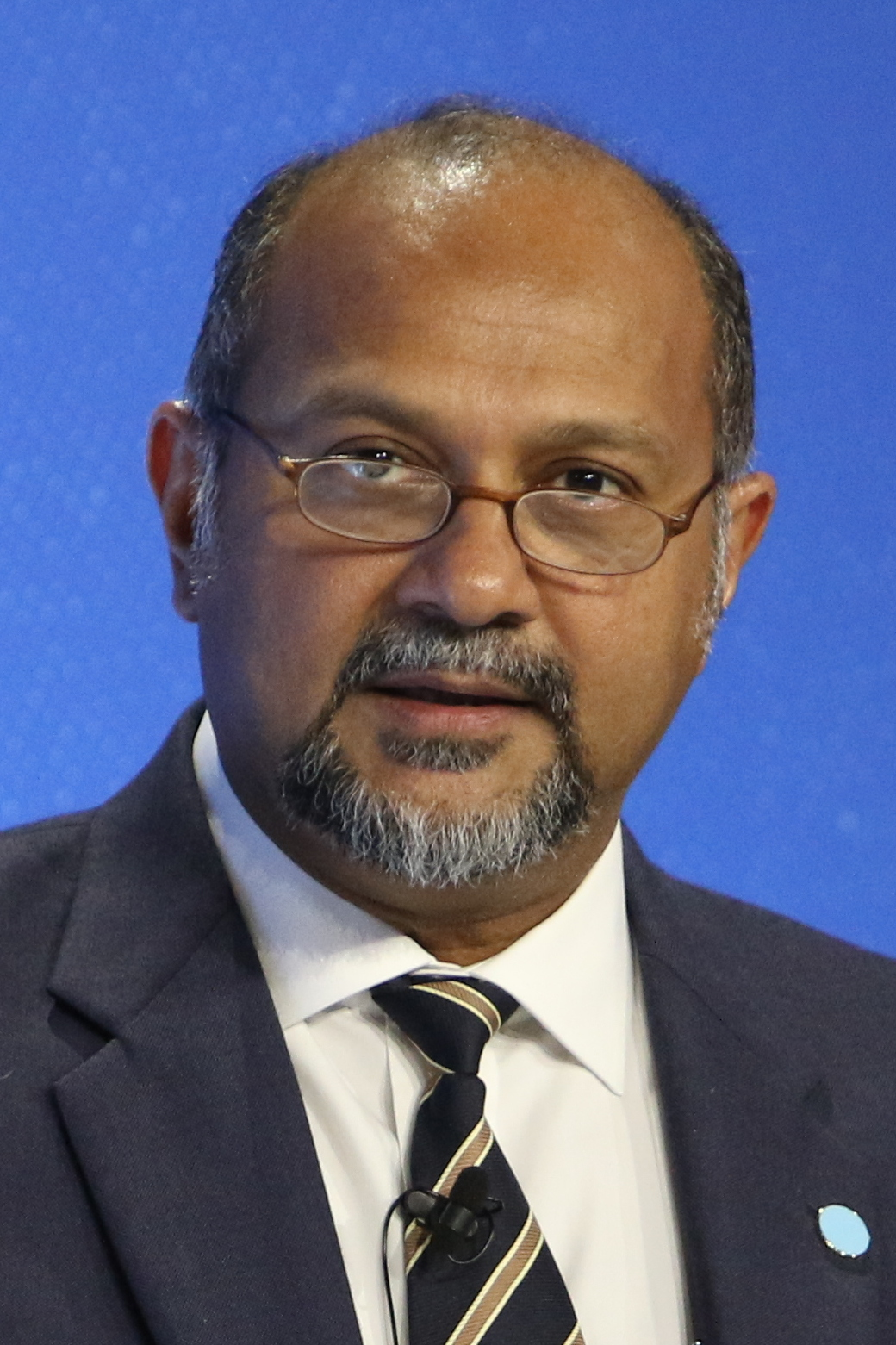

Minister of Digital
- Incumbent
- Assumed office 12 December 2023
- Monarchs: Abdullah (2023–2024); Ibrahim (since 2024)
- Prime Minister: Anwar Ibrahim
- Deputy: Wilson Ugak Kumbong
- Preceded by: Fahmi Fadzil (Minister of Communications and Digital)
- Constituency: Damansara

Minister of Communications and Multimedia
- In office 21 May 2018 – 24 February 2020
- Monarchs: Muhammad V (2018–2019); Abdullah (2019–2020)
- Prime Minister: Mahathir Mohamad
- Deputy: Eddin Syazlee Shith
- Preceded by: Salleh Said Keruak
- Succeeded by: Saifuddin Abdullah
- Constituency: Puchong

Member of the Malaysian Parliament for Damansara
- Incumbent
- Assumed office 19 November 2022
- Preceded by: Tony Pua Kiam Wee (PH–DAP)
- Majority: 124,619 (2022)

Member of the Malaysian Parliament for Puchong
- In office 8 March 2008 – 19 November 2022
- Preceded by: Lau Yeng Peng (BN–GERAKAN)
- Succeeded by: Yeo Bee Yin (PH–DAP)
- Majority: 19,972 (2008); 32,802 (2013); 47,635 (2018)

6th National Chairman of the Democratic Action Party
- Incumbent
- Assumed office 16 March 2025
- Deputy: Nga Kor Ming
- Secretary-General: Anthony Loke Siew Fook
- Preceded by: Lim Guan Eng

State Chairman of the Democratic Action Party of Selangor
- In office 9 December 2018 – 10 November 2024
- Secretary-General: Lim Guan Eng (2018–2022); Anthony Loke Siew Fook (2022–2024)
- Deputy: Ean Yong Hian Wah
- Preceded by: Tony Pua Kiam Wee
- Succeeded by: Ng Sze Han

Personal details
- Born: Gobind Singh Deo s/o Karpal Singh; 19 June 1973 (age 53) Penang, Malaysia
- Party: Democratic Action Party (DAP)
- Other political affiliations: Pakatan Rakyat (PR) (2008–2015); Pakatan Harapan (PH) (since 2015)
- Spouse: Sangeta Kaur Sidhu
- Relations: Jagdeep Singh Deo (elder brother); Ramkarpal Singh (younger brother)
- Children: Jaydn Jhan Karpal Singh Deo Kheeshan Karpal Singh Deo Kayden Karpal Singh Deo Neshaan Karpal Singh Deo
- Parent(s): Karpal Singh; Gurmit Kaur
- Education: University of Warwick (LLB); Lincoln's Inn
- Occupation: Politician
- Profession: Lawyer
- Website: gobindsinghdeo.com

Gobind Singh Deo s/o Karpal Singh (Punjabi: ਗੋਬਿੰਦ ਸਿੰਘ ਦਿਓ, romanized: Gobind Siṅgh Dio; born 19 June 1973) is a Malaysian politician and lawyer who was appointed as the Minister of Digital in the Unity Government administration under Prime Minister Anwar Ibrahim since December 2023 and the Member of Parliament (MP) for Damansara since November 2022.

Previously, he served as the Minister of Communications and Multimedia in the Pakatan Harapan administration under former Prime Minister Mahathir Mohamad from May 2018 to the collapse of the government in February 2020. He was the MP for Puchong from March 2008 to November 2022.

Gobind is the 6th National Chairman of the Democratic Action Party (DAP), a component party of the Pakatan Harapan and formerly Pakatan Rakyat (PR) coalitions. Known as the "Little Lion of Puchong", he is the son of the late DAP leader Karpal Singh, who was known as the "Tiger of Jelutong". His brothers Ramkarpal Singh and Jagdeep Singh Deo are also elected representatives - Ramkarpal is the MP for Bukit Gelugor (Penang), while Jagdeep is the State Legislative Member for Datok Keramat (Penang). Gobind also created history by becoming the first ever Sikh cabinet minister in Malaysian history.

== Early life, education and early career ==
Gobind Singh was born on 19 June 1973 in Penang, Malaysia.

He received his Bachelor of Laws (LLB) from University of Warwick.

He by profession is a law practitioner and founded his law firm Gobind Singh Deo & Co. based in Damansara, Kuala Lumpur. The firm is operated together with his members lawyers. He was admitted to the Malaysian Bar in 1996, a year after returning from Lincoln's Inn.

== Political career ==
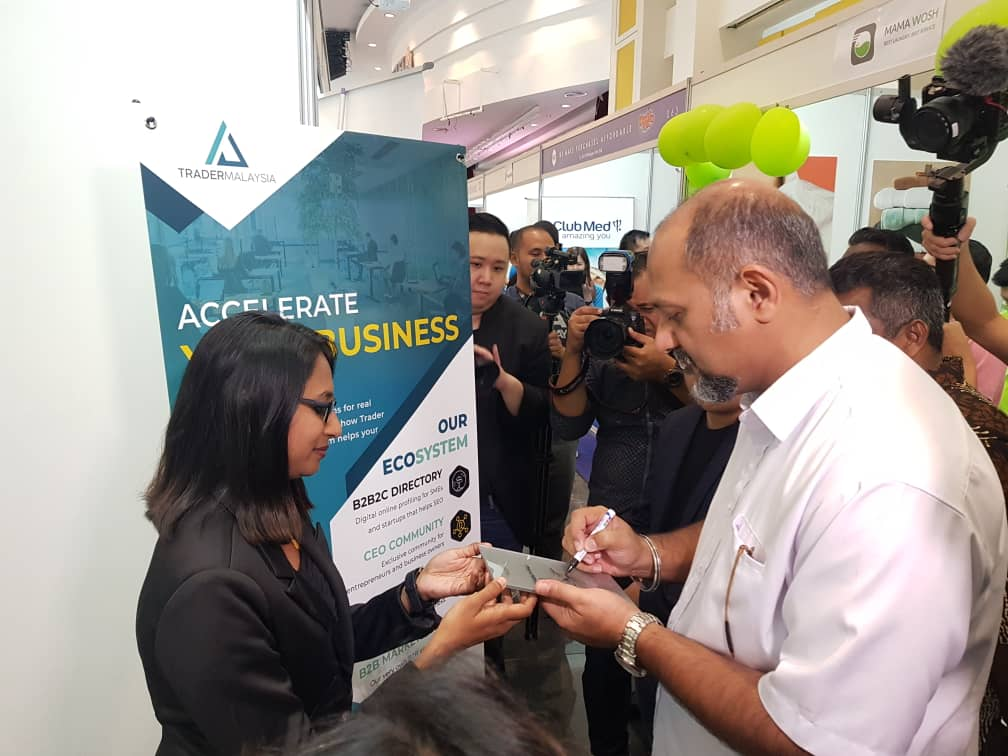
Gobind Singh signing Plaque for Trader Malaysia.

In the 2008 general election, Gobind Singh made his electoral debut after being nominated by PR to contest the Puchong federal seat. He won the seat and was elected to the Parliament as the Puchong MP for the first term after defeating Lau Yeng Peng of Barisan Nasional (BN) by a majority of 19,972 votes amid a significant swing and switch of support to the opposition in Selangor.

In the 2013 general election, Gobind Singh was renominated by PR to defend the Puchong seat. He defended the seat and was reelected to the Parliament as the Puchong MLA for the second term after defeating A. Kohillan Pillay of BN by a majority of 32,802 votes.

In the 2018 general election, Gobind Singh was nominated by PH to defend the Puchong seat. He defended the seat and was reelected to the Parliament as the Puchong MLA for the third term after defeating Ang Chin Tat of BN and Mohamad Rosharizan Mohd Rozlan of Gagasan Sejahtera (GS) by a majority of 47,635 votes.

At the 2022 Democratic Action Party National Congress held on 20 March 2022, Gobind Singh was reelected to the Central Executive Committee of DAP with the highest number of votes, 1,782 and subsequently appointed as the party's Deputy National Chairman.

In the 2022 general election, Gobind Singh was nominated by PH to contest for the Damansara federal seat instead of defending the Puchong seat. He won the seat and was reelected to Parliament as the Damansara MP for the first term after defeating Lim Si Ching of Perikatan Nasional (PN) and Tan Gim Tuan of BN by a majority of 124,619 votes, the largest majority in Malaysian history.

At the 2024 Selangor Democratic Action Party election, Gobind suffered a surprise defeat and failed to enter the state party's executive committee, losing out on the state party's chairmanship. His defeat was seen as a sign that dynastic politics within the party was fading. However, he was re-elected to the party's Central Executive Committee in the 2025 Democratic Action Party National Congress held on 16 March 2025, garnering the highest number of votes once again, at 2,785. He succeeded Lim Guan Eng as the party's National Chairman.

=== Minister of Communications and Multimedia (2018–2020) ===
After PH defeated BN in the 2018 general election and resulted in the first ever transition of power in the Malaysian history, Gobind Singh was appointed as the Minister of Communications and Multimedia on 21 May 2018. He said The Anti-Fake News Act officially gazetted in April will be repealed. Gobind Singh also stated that the proposal to repeal the act would be presented to Prime Minister Mahathir Mohamad for swift action.

He lost the position following the collapse of the PH administration in the 2020 political crisis.

=== Minister of Digital (since 2023) ===
In a cabinet reshuffle on 12 December 2023, Gobind Singh was brought back to the Cabinet after he was appointed as the Minister of Digital, overseeing a new ministry formed from splitting up the Ministry of Communications and Digital, previously led by Fahmi Fadzil. Upon learning the appointment, his brother Ramkarpal resigned from the government as the Deputy Minister in the Prime Minister's Department in charge of Laws and Institutional Reforms to avoid allegations of nepotism. Gobind also took over the Malaysian Administrative Modernisation and Management Planning Unit (MAMPU) from the Prime Minister's Department. Fahmi added that Malaysian Digital Economy Corporation (MDEC), MYNIC Bhd and the Department of Personal Data Protection would also be placed under the purview of Gobind. Gobind highlighted the need to clarify and fine-tune certain aspects in terms of job scopes that fall under his ministry.

== Controversies and issues ==
In 2009 he was suspended from Parliament for 12 months for calling then-Prime Minister, Najib Razak, a "murderer" in a parliamentary debate and insulting the deputy speaker. He later won a legal challenge seeking to be paid his normal remuneration for his period of suspension.

== Election results ==
Parliament of Malaysia
Year	Constituency	Candidate	Votes	Pct	Opponent(s)	Votes	Pct	Ballots cast	Majority	Turnout
2008	P103 Puchong	Gobind Singh Deo (DAP)	35,079	59.14%	Lau Yeng Peng (Gerakan)	15,107	25.47%	59,317	19,972	78.44%
2013	P103 Puchong	Gobind Singh Deo (DAP)	62,938	66.69%	Kohilan Pillay Appu (Gerakan)	30,136	31.93%	94,367	32,802	88.19%
2018	P103 Puchong	Gobind Singh Deo (DAP)	60,429	72.66%	Ang Chin Tat (Gerakan)	12,794	13.27%	96,437	47,635	87.47%
2018	P103 Puchong	Gobind Singh Deo (DAP)	60,429	72.66%	Mohamad Rosharizan Mohd Rozlan (PAS)	10,255	10.63%	96,437	47,635	87.47%
2022	P106 Damansara	Gobind Singh Deo (DAP)	142,875	81.67%	Lim Si Ching (Gerakan)	18,256	10.44%	176,625	124,619	73.90%
2022	P106 Damansara	Gobind Singh Deo (DAP)	142,875	81.67%	Tan Gim Tuan (MCA)	13,806	7.89%	176,625	124,619	73.90%

== Honours ==
=== Honours of Malaysia ===
- Malaysia
  - Recipient of the 16th Yang di-Pertuan Agong Installation Medal (2019)
  - Recipient of the 17th Yang di-Pertuan Agong Installation Medal (2024)
- Selangor
  - Recipient of the Sultan Sharafuddin Silver Jubilee Medal (2026)
