= Tony Pua Kiam Wee =

Malaysian politician and investor

- 潘俭伟
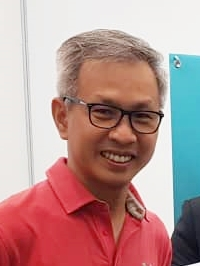
- Pua in 2019

Member of the Malaysian Parliament for Damansara
- In office 9 May 2018 – 19 November 2022
- Preceded by: Position established
- Succeeded by: Gobind Singh Deo (PH–DAP)
- Majority: 106,903 (2018)

Member of the Malaysian Parliament for Petaling Jaya Utara
- In office 8 March 2008 – 9 May 2018
- Preceded by: Chew Mei Fun (BN–MCA)
- Succeeded by: Position abolished
- Majority: 19,972 (2008); 44,672 (2013)

Political Secretary to the Minister of Finance
- In office 22 May 2018 – 24 February 2020
- Monarchs: Muhammad V (2018–2019); Abdullah (2019–2020)
- Prime Minister: Mahathir Mohamad
- Minister: Lim Guan Eng
- Succeeded by: Rizam Ismail

Chairman of the Disciplinary Committee of the Democratic Action Party
- Incumbent
- Assumed office 23 June 2025
- Secretary-General: Anthony Loke Siew Fook
- Preceded by: Chong Chieng Jen

Policy Advisor to the Secretary-General of the Democratic Action Party
- Incumbent
- Assumed office 18 May 2022
- Secretary-General: Anthony Loke Siew Fook
- Preceded by: Position established

Personal details
- Born: Tony Pua Kiam Wee; 1 August 1972 (age 54) Batu Pahat, Johor, Malaysia
- Party: Democratic Action Party (DAP) (since 2008)
- Other political affiliations: Pakatan Rakyat (PR) (2008–2015); Pakatan Harapan (PH) (since 2015)
- Education: Keble College, Oxford
- Occupation: Politician; investor
- Website: tonypua.com

Tony Pua Kiam Wee (simplified Chinese: 潘俭伟; traditional Chinese: 潘儉偉; pinyin: Pān Jiǎnwěi; Pe̍h-ōe-jī: Phoaⁿ Khiām-úi; born 1 August 1972) is a Malaysian politician and investor who served as the Member of Parliament (MP) for Damansara from May 2018 to November 2022, for Petaling Jaya Utara from March 2008 to May 2018 and Political Secretary to the Minister of Finance from May 2018 to February 2020. He is a member of the Democratic Action Party (DAP), a component party of presently the Pakatan Harapan (PH) and formerly Pakatan Rakyat (PR) coalitions. He has also served as Chairman of the Disciplinary Committee of DAP since June 2025 and Policy Advisor to the Secretary-General of DAP since May 2022. He was also the National Publicity Secretary of DAP.

Pua is the former Malaysian CEO of Cyber Village Sdn Bhd, a SESDAQ (SGX second board)-listed company. In early 2007, he disposed of all his interests in the company and tendered his resignation to join the DAP in 2008.

Pua graduated from Keble College, Oxford with a degree in Philosophy, Politics and Economics under a scholarship from the MTC Foundation in 1994. Before that, he received Asean and Shaw Foundation scholarships to pursue his O- and A-Levels in Raffles Institution and Raffles Junior College, in Singapore.

In the 2008 Malaysian general election, Pua won the parliamentary constituency of Petaling Jaya Utara on a DAP ticket. He ran against the incumbent, Chew Mei Fun, then Parliamentary Secretary to the Ministry of Women, Family and Community Development, and Deputy Women Chief of the Malaysian Chinese Association (MCA). In 2009, Pua was appointed the DAP member of the Pakatan Rakyat (PR) committee.

Pua retained his parliamentary seat in 2018 general election with a majority of 106,903, the largest majority in Malaysian history.

== Education ==
Pua attended a secondary school in Singapore on an ASEAN scholarship from the Singaporean government. He attended Raffles Institution and Raffles Junior College. He then went to Oxford University, England, where he studied philosophy, politics and economics at Keble College on an MTC Foundation scholarship.

== Early career ==
After graduating from Oxford University, Pua worked for Andersen Consulting (now Accenture) as a consultant. In March 1997, he started Cyber Village, an e-business consultancy. Pua and three friends opened an office in Kuala Lumpur with four staff.

== Member of Parliament ==
On 9 November 2008, Pua was arrested during a candlelight vigil in Petaling Jaya to commemorate the first anniversary of the Bersih street demonstration. Pua was released on police bail on the morning of 10 November 2008 and was later charged for illegal assembly.

On 10 August 2010, Pua received a live 5.56mm bullet along with a threatening note that were mailed to his constituency service centre. Pua stated that the threat may have been related to his proposal to the Selangor government to cut Bumiputera discounts for homes and commercial property priced above RM 500,000 in the state.

== Defamation lawsuit ==
On 28 January 2011, Syarikat Bekalan Air Selangor (SYABAS) filed a lawsuit against Pua claiming he had permitted Nanyang Siang Pau's Metro edition to publish words defamatory of it. The article quoted him saying the Selangor state government should take over the rights of management of water supply in the state if water concessionaires could not settle their debts. Syabas claimed the report had brought the company into public scandal and its image had been tarnished. The lawsuit sought an injunction to prevent Pua or his agents from publishing defamatory words against the company, and general damages and cost.

Pua argued that Syabas, as a public authority performing a public service, had no locus standi in making a defamation claim. He also said he had a legal, moral and social duty as an MP and a member of the Selangor government Water Review Panel to publish those words and that the public had a right to know. Pua also filed a counter-suit claiming Syabas' suit was frivolous, vexatious and amounted to an abuse of the court process, which resulted in him suffering losses and unnecessary harassment and expenses.

On 6 June 2012, the Malaysian High Court found that SYABAS had proven its case against Pua and ordered him to pay RM200,000 in damages to SYABAS and awarded SYABAS interest at the rate of 4% per annum from the date of judgment till full payment and also costs. Justice Amelia Tee Hong Geok Abdullah also struck out Pua's counter-claim application and granted SYABAS an injunction to restrain Pua and his agents from further publishing or giving permission to be published "similar defamatory words" against SYABAS. Pua later stated on his blog that he maintains "that the above statement is not defamatory, and will instruct my lawyers to file an appeal in the Court of Appeal".

On 7 July 2012, Pua posted on his blog that although an appeal was underway, he was required to pay the amount of RM200,000 to SYABAS by 16 July 2012. DAP Malaysia subsequently initiated a mass fundraising campaign titled "RM1 for Water Rights: 100,000 Malaysians Support Tony Pua vs Syabas" calling for 100,000 Malaysians to donate RM1 each to help Pua pay for the damages to SYABAS.

He subsequently won the Court of Appeal case. SYABAS appealed the decision to the Federal Court of Malaysia. In the 2015 Federal Court case ([2015] 6 MLJ 187), Pua won the appeal based on the Lucas-Box principle by providing his own reasonable meaning to the impugned words.

== Controversies and issues ==
=== Comments on the partial pardon of Najib Razak ===
On 2 February 2024, the Pardons Board issued a statement to announce its decision to grant a partial pardon to former Prime Minister Najib Razak who had been jailed in Kajang Prison since 23 August 2022, halving the length of his jail term from 12 to 6 years and reducing the amount of fine from RM 210,000,000 to RM 50,000,000. Following the pardon, Najib was expected to be released from the prison on 23 August 2028. However, if the fine was not paid, a year would be added to his new jail term. In response to the decision, Pua made sarcastic and controversial comments on his Facebook page, drawing strong criticisms and dissatisfaction from UMNO and UMNO Youth. UMNO Youth Chief Muhamad Akmal Saleh threatened Pua that UMNO Youth members would lodge police reports nationwide against the comments made by Pua and told Pua to 'see you in court', they later did so. UMNO Vice President Wan Rosdy Wan Ismail also demanded Pua to apologise and delete the comments or face legal actions. He further criticised Pua that his comments had gone overboard and accused him of looking for cheap publicity. The police also summoned Pua to record his statements after the investigations of the comments had been launched as the comments had 'elements of inciting the public to hate the royal institution'. After recording his statement for slightly more than an hour, Pua added that he had given full cooperation to the police and revealed that he would hand over his laptop to the police where he used to upload the comments and the access to his Facebook account. UMNO President Ahmad Zahid Hamidi then told PH to reprimand its members who spoke out against the decision 'antagonistically' and asked for an apology to be made to UMNO. However, he believed that these comments were not the official stances that represented PH. He also assured that the relations between UMNO and DAP were not affected by the comments. It was widely believed that Ahmad Zahid was responding to the comments of Pua without naming his name. Inspector-General of Police Razarudin Husain noted that they had about seven days to investigate and expected the investigation to be completed soon after recording the statement of Pua. He also said the investigation papers would be forwarded to the Attorney General's Chambers (AGC).

== Publications ==
The Tiger that Lost its Roar, a tale of Malaysia's political economy.

== Election results ==
Parliament of Malaysia
Year	Constituency	Candidate	Votes	Pct	Opponent(s)	Votes	Pct	Ballots cast	Majority	Turnout
2008	P106 Petaling Jaya Utara	Tony Pua Kiam Wee (DAP)	37,851	67.92%	Chew Mei Fun (MCA)	17,879	32.08%	56,257	19,972	73.47%
2013	P106 Petaling Jaya Utara	Tony Pua Kiam Wee (DAP)	57,407	81.84%	Chew Hoong Ling (MCA)	12,735	18.16%	70,727	44,672	82.82%
2018	P106 Damansara	Tony Pua Kiam Wee (DAP)	121,283	89.00%	Ho Kwok Xheng (MCA)	14,380	10.55%	137,639	106,903	83.76%
2018	P106 Damansara	Tony Pua Kiam Wee (DAP)	121,283	89.00%	Wong Mun Kheong (PRM)	617	0.45%	137,639	106,903	83.76%

== Policies ==
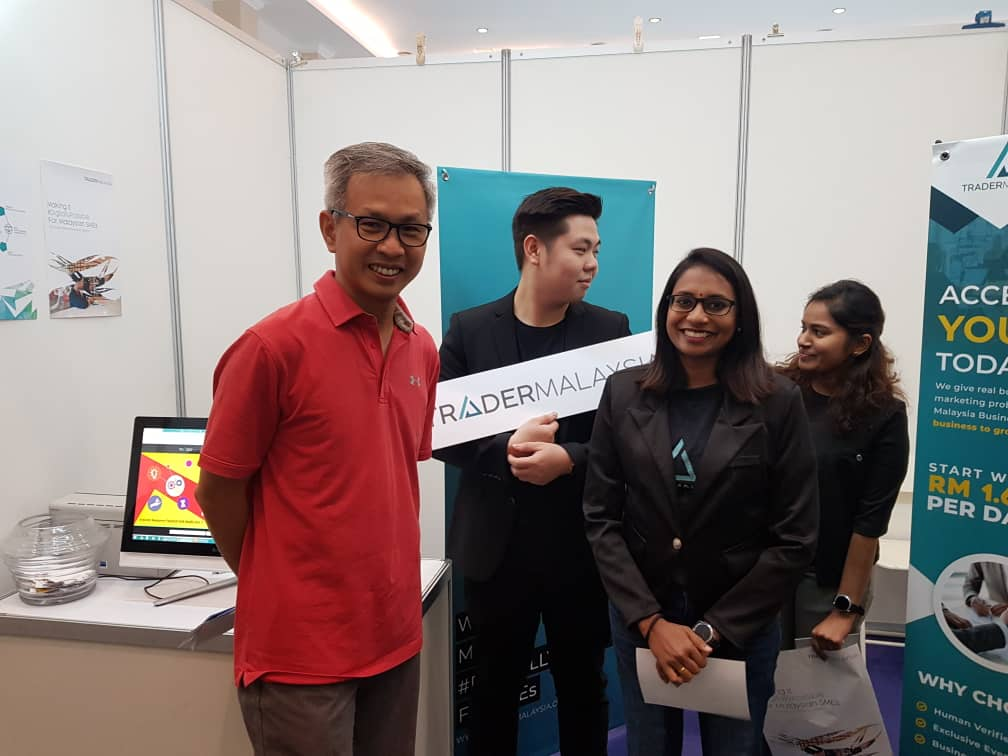
YB Pua with the team of Trader Malaysia, signed at PJ Startup Festival

In 2012, Pua suggested that the Bumiputera discount for housing and real estate must be abolished for houses above RM500,000. He disagreed with giving discounts on expensive houses such as those priced at or above RM 1 million.

In one of his statements, Pua said the government should reduce the number of civil servants. His idea was rejected by PKR leader Anwar Ibrahim as impractical. Pua said he wants to make the government sector become more efficient and less costly.

Pua was invited by the organizers of the recent startup acceleration program held at Dewan Sivik.

== See also ==
- Damansara (federal constituency)
- Non-Singapore politicians who had studied in Singapore

Parliament of Malaysia
Preceded by Chew Mei Fun	Member of Parliament for Petaling Jaya Utara; 8 March 2008–7 April 2018	Constituency eliminated
Preceded by Chew Mei Fun	Member of Parliament for Damansara; 9 May 2018–present	Incumbent
