= Ronnie Liu Tian Khiew =

Malaysian politician (born 1958)

- 刘天球

Member of the Selangor State Executive Council (Local Government, Studies and Research)
- In office 24 March 2008 – 14 May 2013
- Monarch: Sharafuddin
- Menteri Besar: Khalid Ibrahim
- Succeeded by: Teng Chang Khim
- Constituency: Pandamaran

State Secretary of the Democratic Action Party of Selangor
- In office 9 December 2018 – 14 November 2021
- Assistant: Ong Kian Ming
- Secretary-General: Lim Guan Eng
- Preceded by: Ean Yong Hian Wah
- Succeeded by: Ng Sze Han

Member of the Selangor State Legislative Assembly for Sungai Pelek
- In office 9 May 2018 – 12 August 2023
- Preceded by: Lai Nyuk Lan (PR–DAP)
- Succeeded by: Lwi Kian Keong (PH–DAP)
- Majority: 6,586 (2018)

Member of the Selangor State Legislative Assembly for Pandamaran
- In office 8 March 2008 – 5 May 2013
- Preceded by: Teh Kim Poo (BN–MCA)
- Succeeded by: Eric Tan Pok Shyong (PR–DAP)
- Majority: 6,586 (2008)

Personal details
- Born: Ronnie Liu Tian Khiew; 29 March 1958 (age 68) Raub, Pahang, Federation of Malaya (now Malaysia)
- Citizenship: Malaysian
- Party: Democratic Action Party (DAP) (1982–2023); Independent (2023-2026); Parti Bangsa Malaysia (PBM) (since 2026)
- Other political affiliations: Gagasan Rakyat (GR) (1990–1995); Barisan Alternatif (BA) (1999–2004); Pakatan Rakyat (PR) (2008–2015); Pakatan Harapan (PH) (2015–2023)
- Occupation: Politician

Ronnie Liu Tian Khiew (Chinese: 劉天球; Jyutping: Lau4 Tin1 Kau4; Pe̍h-ōe-jī: Lâu Thian-kiû; Pha̍k-fa-sṳ: Liù Thiên-khiù; born 29 March 1958) is a Malaysian politician who served as Member of the Selangor State Executive Council (EXCO) in the Pakatan Rakyat (PR) state administration under former Menteri Besar Khalid Ibrahim from March 2008 to May 2013 as well as Member of the Selangor State Legislative Assembly (MLA) for Sungai Pelek from May 2018 to August 2023 and Pandamaran from March 2008 to May 2013. He is an independent. He was a member, Member of the Central Executive Committee (CEC) and State Secretary of Selangor of the Democratic Action Party (DAP), a component party of the Pakatan Harapan (PH) and formerly PR coalitions. He is controversial for remarks on various political issues.

== Politics ==
He was a Member of the DAP Central Executive Committee and the International Secretary for DAP. On 9 October 2022, he had announced that he will quit DAP due to dissatisfaction of some of the party leaders, but after two days he had decided to continue to stay in the party for his constituents. On 23 June 2023 when he became the caretaker Sungai Pelek MLA following the dissolution of the assembly, he asked for the termination of his DAP party membership effective the next day on 24 June 2023 in a letter addressed to Secretary General of the party Anthony Loke after being with the party for 41 years since he was in secondary school in 1982. He gave the reason of having met a lot of "things that are beyond my expectations". Although leaving DAP, he carried on aligning himself with and supporting PH, Prime Minister Anwar Ibrahim of PH and the Malaysia Madani concept introduced by the PH administration.

== Controversies ==
=== Chin Peng as a Fighter for Independence ===
On 1 September 2005, in his blog in the official website of DAP, he had stated that Chin Peng, the leader of the Malayan Communist Party, is a Fighter of Independence for Malaya. This statement had offended many of the veteran soldiers, such as Kanang anak Langkau.

=== Obstructing operation of Subang Jaya City Council ===
On 3 November 2007, police in Puchong had started an investigation on him as he had obstructed officers of the Subang Jaya City Council to stop immoral activities in a hotel in Bandar Puchong Jaya. Assistant Commissioner, Zainal Rashid Abu Bakar had said that he was given 5 warnings but he still refused to cooperate.

=== Tee Boon Hock Incident ===
On 29 July 2010, The Star had exposed that Tee Boon Hock, a member of Klang Municipal Council had used official letters to enable his cronies and family members to get contracts from the government. On 12 August 2010, the Speaker of Selangor State Legislative Assembly, Teng Chang Khim and he were called to the DAP Disciplinary Committee as Tee had said that he was instructed by Ronnie.

=== Removing BERSATU from PH ===
On 23 October 2019, he had criticised by-then Prime Minister of Malaysia, Mahathir Mohamed that he had a different ideology with Pakatan Harapan. He also asked for another general election so that Pakatan Harapan can form a better federal government without BERSATU. The members of BERSATU had denounced him and Mohd Rafiq Naizamohideen had asked DAP to reconsider the alliance between DAP and BERSATU. DAP had stated that this is just a personal statement by Ronnie and the Disciplinary Committee had summoned him for questioning.

=== Insulting the King ===
On 21 October 2020, he had posted a picture of the 2020 Thai protest and captioned "They say no to the King". He deleted the post after someone had lodged a police report, but he still get investigated because of it.

== Election results ==
Parliament of Malaysia
Year	Constituency	Candidate	Votes	Pct	Opponent(s)	Votes	Pct	Ballots cast	Majority	Turnout
1999	P094 Petaling Jaya Utara	Ronnie Liu Tian Khiew (DAP)	23,122	46.26%	Chew Mei Fun (MCA)	25,603	51.23%	49,981	2,481	70.76%
1999	P094 Petaling Jaya Utara	Ronnie Liu Tian Khiew (DAP)	23,122	46.26%	Wee Chek Aik (MDP)	706	1.41%	49,981	2,481	70.76%
2004	P106 Petaling Jaya Utara	Ronnie Liu Tian Khiew (DAP)	19,739	37.63%	Chew Mei Fun (MCA)	32,422	61.80%	52,460	13,043	69.09%

Selangor State Legislative Assembly
Year	Constituency	Candidate	Votes	Pct.	Opponent(s)	Votes	Pct	Ballots cast	Majority	Turnout
2008	N47 Pandamaran	Ronnie Liu Tian Khiew (DAP)	12,547	62.63%	Teh Kim Poo (MCA)	7,149	35.68%	20,034	5,398	79.53%
2018	N56 Sungai Pelek	Ronnie Liu Tian Khiew (DAP)	13,484	51.65%	Ng Chok Sin (MCA)	6,898	26.42%	26,109	6,586	87.70%
2018	N56 Sungai Pelek	Ronnie Liu Tian Khiew (DAP)	13,484	51.65%	Rohaya Mohd Shahir (PAS)	5,200	19.92%	26,109	6,586	87.70%
2018	N56 Sungai Pelek	Ronnie Liu Tian Khiew (DAP)	13,484	51.65%	Harry Arul Raj Krishnan (PAP)	79	0.30%	26,109	6,586	87.70%
