= Chew Mei Fun =

Malaysian politician

Yang Berbahagia Datin Paduka Chew Mei Fun DSIS
- 周美芬

Secretary-General of Malaysian Chinese Association
- In office 16 November 2018 – 20 July 2019
- President: Wee Ka Siong
- Deputy: Chai Kim Sen
- Preceded by: Ong Ka Chuan
- Succeeded by: Chong Sin Woon

Deputy Minister of Women, Family and Community Development
- In office 27 June 2014 – 9 May 2018 Serving with Azizah Mohd Dun
- Monarchs: Abdul Halim; Muhammad V
- Prime Minister: Najib Razak
- Minister: Rohani Abdul Karim
- Preceded by: Herself
- Succeeded by: Hannah Yeoh
- Constituency: Senator
- In office 10 April 2009 – 4 June 2010
- Monarch: Mizan Zainal Abidin
- Prime Minister: Najib Razak
- Minister: Sharizat Abdul Jalil
- Preceded by: Noriah Kasnon
- Succeeded by: Heng Seai Kie
- Constituency: Senator

Vice-President of the Malaysian Chinese Association
- In office 21 December 2013 – 3 November 2018
- President: Liow Tiong Lai

Member of the Malaysian Parliament for Petaling Jaya Utara
- In office November 1999 – February 2008
- Preceded by: Lim Kuo Phau (MCA-BN)
- Succeeded by: Tony Pua (DAP-PR)
- Majority: 2,481 (1999); 13,043 (2004)

Personal details
- Born: Chew Mei Fun; 17 October 1964 (age 61) Penang, Malaysia
- Party: Malaysian Chinese Association (MCA)
- Other political affiliations: Barisan Nasional (BN); Perikatan Nasional (PN)
- Education: National Chengchi University; Universiti Tunku Abdul Rahman

Chew Mei Fun (Chinese: 周美芬; pinyin: Zhōu Měifēn; Pe̍h-ōe-jī: Chiu Bí-hun; born 17 October 1964) is a Malaysian politician who was the Secretary-General of the Malaysian Chinese Association (MCA). She is a former two-term Member of Parliament (MP) of Malaysia for Petaling Jaya Utara from 1999 to 2008. She is also a former Deputy Minister of Women, Family and Community Development.

== Education ==
Chew received her secondary education at Kuen Cheng High School before going on to receive a Bachelor of Arts (BA) in Literature from the National Chengchi University in Taipei and a Master of Arts (MA) in Chinese Studies from the Universiti Tunku Abdul Rahman. She is currently pursuing a doctorate (PhD) at Peking University.

== Political career ==
Chew began her political career after joining the Raub MCA Woman's Youth (Beliawanis) Section and served as private secretary to former Raub MP Teng Gaik Kwan in 1995. She contested and was elected twice for the parliamentary seat of Petaling Jaya Utara in Selangor in the 1999 and 2004 general election. She was appointed as Deputy Minister of Women, Family and Community Development by the 6th Prime Minister of Malaysia, Najib Razak on 9 April 2009 in Putrajaya. She was sworn in before the Yang di-Pertuan Agong, Mizan Zainal Abidin, at the Istana Negara on 10 April 2009. She was appointed a Senator after failing to defend her parliamentary seat in the 2008 general election.

On 8 April 2010, Chew resigned as MCA Women Chief and deputy minister. Prior to this, on 28 March 2010, during the 2010 MCA election, she had pledged to resign from all her posts if MCA delegates still voted for Dr. Chua Soi Lek who was involved with DVD sex scandals as president. However, Chua eventually defeated Ong Tee Keat and Ong Ka Ting with a slim majority, leading to many to call for Chew to honour her pledge. Many of her followers at Wisma MCA carried banners reading "Holding the principle for the honor of women", "We support you", "We need you" and "Do not resign!". She was then dropped by MCA as a candidate in the 2013 general election.

Chew was selected as Barisan Nasional (BN) candidate in the 2014 Kajang by-election of the Selangor State Legislative Assembly seat following the events of the Kajang Move. However, she lost to Wan Azizah Wan Ismail of the People's Justice Party (PKR) by 5,379 votes. Prior to returning to her former office as deputy minister in 2014, Chew was again sworn in as a Senator. But she resigned as a Senator on 27 June 2017 to focus on MCA duties.

In the 2018 general election, Chew contested the Raub parliamentary constituency in Pahang, but lost to Pakatan Harapan (PH)'s Tengku Zulpuri Shah Raja Puji of Democratic Action Party (DAP) in a three-corner fight with Pan-Malaysian Islamic Party (PAS). After Wee Ka Siong was elected as the 11th President of MCA in 2018 MCA election, he selected Chew to become the new and first female MCA Secretary-General. On 13 July 2019, Chew tendered her resignation from the office, effective 20 July 2019, to pursue a PhD in Peking University.

== Controversies ==
In September 2017, DAP lawmakers questioned the MCA of Selangor about a one-acre plot of land in Kampung Cempaka, Petaling Jaya which was allegedly purchased under market price. MCA had applied for the land in 2006 and got approval from the state government in 2007 which was then under Barisan Nasional and Chew was still the MP of Petaling Jaya Utara. MCA then bought the land at RM 52,000 in 2008 at RM 1 per square foot (psf), when the land, in fact, was worth more than RM400 psf. It was later discovered by Yeo Bee Yin, the Selangor state assemblywoman (MLA) for Damansara Utama of DAP then that the MCA's plans to convert the land to commercial status earlier in the year and how MCA managed to purchase the land under market price were in questions. Chew denied being involved in the land application and declined to elaborate further. She later threatened to sue Yeo and the new DAP MP for Petaling Jaya Utara then, Tony Pua of defamatory for revealing the matter, which never took place.

== Election results ==
Selangor State Legislative Assembly
Year	Constituency	Candidate	Votes	Pct	Opponent(s)	Votes	Pct	Ballots cast	Majority	Turnout
2014	N25 Kajang	Chew Mei Fun (MCA)	11,362	40.43%	Wan Azizah Wan Ismail (PKR)	16,741	59.57%	28,314	5,379	72.09%

Parliament of Malaysia
Year	Constituency	Candidate	Votes	Pct	Opponent(s)	Votes	Pct	Ballots cast	Majority	Turnout
1999	P094 Petaling Jaya Utara	Chew Mei Fun (MCA)	25,603	51.80%	Ronnie Liu Tian Khiew (DAP)	23,122	46.78%	49,981	2,481	70.76%
1999	P094 Petaling Jaya Utara	Chew Mei Fun (MCA)	25,603	51.80%	Wee Chek Aik (MDP)	706	1.43%	49,981	2,481	70.76%
2004	P106 Petaling Jaya Utara	Chew Mei Fun (MCA)	32,422	62.16%	Ronnie Liu Tian Khiew (DAP)	19,739	37.84%	52,460	13,043	69.09%
2008	P106 Petaling Jaya Utara	Chew Mei Fun (MCA)	17,879	32.08%	Tony Pua Kiam Wee (DAP)	37,851	67.92%	56,257	19,972	73.47%
2018	P080 Raub	Chew Mei Fun (MCA)	17,500	38.02%	Tengku Zulpuri Shah Raja Puji (DAP)	20,659	44.89%	46,971	3,159	81.37%
2018	P080 Raub	Chew Mei Fun (MCA)	17,500	38.02%	Mohd Nilam Abd Manap (PAS)	7,866	17.09%	46,971	3,159	81.37%

== Honours ==
=== Honour of Malaysia ===
- Selangor
  - Knight Companion of the Order of Sultan Sharafuddin Idris Shah (DSIS) – Datin Paduka (2005)

=== Awards ===
- 'The Outstanding Young Malaysian' by JCI Malaysia (2004)
- 'Outstanding Alumni of Malaysia' by National Chengchi University (2006)

== See also ==
- Petaling Jaya Utara (federal constituency)
