= Damansara (Selangor federal constituency) =

Federal constituency of Selangor, Malaysia

Damansara (P106)
Selangor constituency

Federal constituency
- Legislature: Dewan Rakyat
- MP: Gobind Singh Deo; PH
- Constituency created: 1958
- Constituency abolished: 1974
- Constituency re-created: 2018
- First contested: 1959
- Last contested: 2022

Demographics
- Population (2020): 468,939
- Electors (2023): 241,978
- Area (km²): 65
- Pop. density (per km²): 7,214.4

Damansara is a federal constituency in Petaling District and Gombak District, Selangor, Malaysia, that has been represented in the Dewan Rakyat from 1959 to 1974 and from 2018 to the present.

The federal constituency was created in the 2018 redistribution and is mandated to return a single member to the Dewan Rakyat under the first past the post voting system. The seat has the record for largest majority won in Malaysian electoral history in 2018 by Tony Pua and 2022 by Gobind Singh Deo, with the victorious candidate obtaining over 80% of the vote.

== Demographics ==
Ethnic breakdown of Damansara's electorate as of 2022
1. Chinese (66.2%)
2. Malay (22.9%)
3. Indian (9.90%)
4. Other ethnicities (1.00%)
Age breakdown of Damansara's electorate as of 2022
1. 18-20 (5.55%)
2. 21-29 (17.9%)
3. 30-39 (18.5%)
4. 40-49 (18.5%)
5. 50-59 (16.0%)
6. 60-69 (13.0%)
7. 70-79 (7.64%)
8. 80-89 (2.52%)
9. above 90 (0.40%)
Gender breakdown of Damansara's electorate as of 2022
1. Male (48.7%)
2. Female (51.3%)

== History ==
It was abolished in 1974 when it was redistributed but re-created in the 2018 redelineation exercise.

=== Polling districts ===
According to the federal gazette issued on 18 July 2023, the Damansara constituency is divided into 57 polling districts.

State constituency	Polling Districts	Code	Location
Kampung Tunku (N35)	Seksyen 21 Timur	106/35/01	SMK (P) Sri Aman
Kampung Tunku (N35)	Seksyen 20 Utara	106/35/02	SMK (P) Sri Aman
Kampung Tunku (N35)	Seksyen 20 Selatan	106/35/03	SMK (P) Sri Aman
Kampung Tunku (N35)	Seksyen 22	106/35/04	SMK (P) Sri Aman
Kampung Tunku (N35)	Kampung Tunku Utara	106/35/05	SK Kampung Tunku
Kampung Tunku (N35)	Kampung Tunku Selatan	106/35/06	SK Kampung Tunku
Kampung Tunku (N35)	SS 3 Utara	106/35/07	SMK Sri Permata
Kampung Tunku (N35)	SS 3 Barat	106/35/08	SMK Sri Permata
Kampung Tunku (N35)	SS 3 Timur	106/35/09	Dewan Seberguna SS 3/14 Petaling Jaya
Kampung Tunku (N35)	Sungai Way Utara	106/35/10	SJK (C) Sungai Way
Kampung Tunku (N35)	Sungai Way Tengah Dua	106/35/11	SJK (C) Sungai Way
Kampung Tunku (N35)	Sungai Way Tengah Satu	106/35/12	SJK (C) Sungai Way
Kampung Tunku (N35)	Sungai Way Selatan Dua	106/36/13	SJK (C) Sungai Way
Kampung Tunku (N35)	Sungai Way Selatan Satu	106/35/14	SJK (C) Sungai Way
Kampung Tunku (N35)	SS 2 Utara	106/35/15	SK Taman Sea
Kampung Tunku (N35)	SS 2 Tengah	106/35/16	SJK (C) Puay Chai
Kampung Tunku (N35)	SS 2 Selatan	106/35/17	SMK Taman S.E.A
Kampung Tunku (N35)	Seksyen 21 Barat	106/35/18	SMK Taman S.E.A
Bandar Utama (N36)	SS 21 Utara	106/36/01	SK Damansara Utama
Bandar Utama (N36)	SS 20	106/36/02	SMK Damansara Utama
Bandar Utama (N36)	Damansara Jaya Utara	106/36/03	SMK Damansara Jaya
Bandar Utama (N36)	SS 23	106/36/04	SK Taman Megah
Bandar Utama (N36)	SS 24	106/36/05	SK Taman Megah
Bandar Utama (N36)	SS 26	106/36/06	SJK (C) Yuk Chai
Bandar Utama (N36)	Kampung Chempaka	106/36/07	SMK Tropicana Petaling Jaya
Bandar Utama (N36)	SS 25	106/36/08	SK Taman Megah
Bandar Utama (N36)	SS 4	106/36/09	SMK Kelana Jaya SS4
Bandar Utama (N36)	SS 21 Selatan	106/36/10	Dewan Seberguna MBPJ SS 21/12
Bandar Utama (N36)	Damansara Jaya Selatan	106/36/11	SK Damansara Jaya (1); SK Damansara Jaya (2)
Bandar Utama (N36)	Bandar Utama BU 1 & BU 2	106/36/12	SMK Bandar Utama
Bandar Utama (N36)	Sungai Kayu Ara Utara	106/36/13	SRA Kampung Sungai Kayu Ara
Bandar Utama (N36)	Bandar Utama BU 3 - BU 10	106/36/14	SMK Bandar Utama Damansara (3)
Bandar Utama (N36)	Bandar Utama BU 11 - BU 12	106/36/15	SJK (T) Effingham Bandar Utama
Bandar Utama (N36)	Sungai Kayu Ara Selatan	106/36/16	SK Bandar Utama Damansara
Bandar Utama (N36)	Kayu Ara Indah	106/36/17	SK Bandar Utama Damansara (2)
Bandar Utama (N36)	Sunway Damansara PJU 3	106/36/18	SJK (C) Damansara
Bukit Lanjan (N37)	Desa Jaya Jalan 1 - Jalan 19	106/37/01	SJK (C) Desa Jaya
Bukit Lanjan (N37)	Sri Damansara Jalan SD 1 - Jalan SD 5	106/37/02	SK Bandar Baru Sri Damansara
Bukit Lanjan (N37)	Sri Damansara Jalan SD 7 - Jalan SD 9	106/37/03	SK Bandar Sri Damanaara 3
Bukit Lanjan (N37)	Bukit Lanjan	106/37/04	SK Bukit Lanjan (Asli) Bandar Damansara Perdana
Bukit Lanjan (N37)	Desa Jaya Jalan 20 - Jalan 38	106/37/05	SJK (C) Desa Jaya
Bukit Lanjan (N37)	Desa Jaya Jalan 39 - Jalan 56	106/37/06	SJK (C) Desa Jaya
Bukit Lanjan (N37)	Damansara Damai PJU 10	106/37/07	SMK Damansara Damai 1
Bukit Lanjan (N37)	Sri Damasara Jalan SD 10	106/37/08	SMK Bandar Sri Damansara (2)
Bukit Lanjan (N37)	Sri Damansara Jalan SD 12	106/37/09	SK Bandar Sri Damansara (2)
Bukit Lanjan (N37)	Saujana Damansara PJU 10	106/37/10	SK Damansara Damai 1
Bukit Lanjan (N37)	Taman Ehsan Jalan 5	106/37/11	SK Taman Ehsan
Bukit Lanjan (N37)	Taman Ehsan Jalan 2	106/37/12	SMK Taman Ehsan
Bukit Lanjan (N37)	Desa Aman Puri	106/37/13	SK Desa Amanpuri
Bukit Lanjan (N37)	Taman Ehsan Jalan 4	106/37/14	SRA Taman Ehsan Kepong
Bukit Lanjan (N37)	Sungai Buloh	106/37/15	SJK (T) Saraswathy
Bukit Lanjan (N37)	Selayang Utama	106/37/16	SK Selayang Utama
Bukit Lanjan (N37)	Kepong Utara	106/37/17	SK Kepong, FRIM
Bukit Lanjan (N37)	Selayang Jaya	106/37/18	SK Selayang Jaya
Bukit Lanjan (N37)	Taman Daya	106/37/19	SMK Kepong
Bukit Lanjan (N37)	Taman Indah Perdana	106/37/20	Padang Awam Taman Indah Perdana Kepong
Bukit Lanjan (N37)	Taman Bidara	106/37/21	Dewan Seberguna Taman Bidara

=== Representation history ===
Members of Parliament for Damansara
Parliament	No	Years	Member	Party	Vote Share
Constituency created from Selangor Tengah in the state of Selangor
Parliament of the Federation of Malaya
1st	P073	1959–1963	Karam Singh Veriah (ਕਰਮ ਸਿੰਘ ਵੇਰਿਆ)	SF (Ra'ayat)	9,026; 61.49%
Parliament of Malaysia
1st	P073	1963–1964	Karam Singh Veriah (ਕਰਮ ਸਿੰਘ ਵੇਰਿਆ)	SF (Ra'ayat)	9,026; 61.49%
2nd	P073	1964–1969	Michael Chen Wing Sum (曾永森)	Alliance (MCA)	9,148; 43.68%
		1969–1971	Parliament was suspended		
3rd	P073	1971–1974	Hor Cheok Foon (何卓欢)	DAP	15,567; 56.29%
Constituency abolished, split into Petaling, Shah Alam and Sungei Besi
Constituency re-created from Petaling Jaya Utara, Selayang and Subang
14th	P106	2018–2022	Tony Pua Kiam Wee (潘俭伟)	PH (DAP)	121,283; 89.00%
15th	P106	2022–present	Gobind Singh Deo (ਗੋਬਿੰਦ ਸਿੰਘ ਦਿਓ)	PH (DAP)	142,875; 81.67%

=== State constituency ===
Parliamentary constituency	State constituency						
Parliamentary constituency	1955–59*	1959–1974	1974–1986	1986–1995	1995–2004	2004–2018	2018–present
Damansara							Bandar Utama
Damansara							Bukit Lanjan
Damansara		Bukit Raja					
Damansara							Kampung Tunku
Damansara		Serdang					

=== Historical boundaries ===
State Constituency	Area	
State Constituency	1959	2018
Bandar Utama		Bandar Utama; Kampung Chempaka; Kayu Ara; Kelana Jaya; SS20 - 26
Bukit Lanjan		Bukit Lanjan; Desa Aman Puri; Taman Ehsan; Selayang Utama; Sri Damansara
Bukit Raja	Batu Tiga; Bukit Lanchong; Bukit Raja; Padang Jawa; Sungai Renggam	
Kampung Tunku		Kampung Tunku; SS2 & 3; Sungai Way; Seksyen 20 - 21; Taman Sea
Serdang	Kelana Jaya; Puchong; Serdang; Sri Petaling; Sungai Besi	

=== Current state assembly members ===
No.	State Constituency	Member	Coalition (Party)
N35	Kampung Tunku	Lim Yi Wei	PH (DAP)
N36	Bandar Utama	Jamaliah Jamaluddin	PH (DAP)
N37	Bukit Lanjan	Pua Pei Ling	PH (PKR)

=== Local governments & postcodes ===
No.	State Constituency	Local Government	Postcode
N35	Kampung Tunku	Petaling Jaya City Council	46300, 47300, 47301, 47308, 47400, 47410, 47800, 47810, 47820, 47830 Petaling Jaya; 47000 Sungai Buloh; 68100 Batu Caves; 52100, 52109, 52200 Kuala Lumpur
N36	Bandar Utama	Petaling Jaya City Council	46300, 47300, 47301, 47308, 47400, 47410, 47800, 47810, 47820, 47830 Petaling Jaya; 47000 Sungai Buloh; 68100 Batu Caves; 52100, 52109, 52200 Kuala Lumpur
N37	Bukit Lanjan	Petaling Jaya City Council; Selayang Municipal Council (Desa Aman Puri, Kepong Ulu, Wangsa Permai, Taman Ehsan, Desa Jaya)	46300, 47300, 47301, 47308, 47400, 47410, 47800, 47810, 47820, 47830 Petaling Jaya; 47000 Sungai Buloh; 68100 Batu Caves; 52100, 52109, 52200 Kuala Lumpur

== Election results ==
Malaysian general election, 2022
Party	Candidate	Votes	%	∆%
PH	Gobind Singh Deo	142,875	81.67	▲81.67
PN	Lim Si Ching	18,256	10.44	▲10.44
BN	Tan Gim Tuan	13,806	7.89	▼2.84
Total valid votes		174,937	100.00	
Total rejected ballots		973		
Unreturned ballots		715		
Turnout		176,625	73.90	▼9.86
Registered electors		239,103		
Majority		124,619	71.23	▼7.21
PH hold		Swing		
Source(s) https://lom.agc.gov.my/ilims/upload/portal/akta/outputp/1753283/PUB612.pdf

Malaysian general election, 2018
Party	Candidate	Votes	%	∆%
PKR	Tony Pua Kiam Wee	121,283	89.00	
BN	Ryan Ho Kwok Xheng	14,380	10.55	
Parti Rakyat Malaysia	Wong Mun Kheong	617	0.45	
Total valid votes		136,280	100.00	
Total rejected ballots		867		
Unreturned ballots		492		
Turnout		137,639	83.76	
Registered electors		164,322		
Majority		106,903	78.44	
PKR hold		Swing		
Source(s) "His Majesty's Government Gazette - Notice of Contested Election, Parliament for the State of Selangor [P.U. (B) 239/2018]" (PDF). Attorney General's Chambers of Malaysia. 3 May 2018. Archived from the original (PDF) on 2019-07-19. "Federal Government Gazette - Results of Contested Election and Statements of the Poll after the Official Addition of Votes, Parliamentary Constituencies for the State of Selangor [P.U. (B) 313/2018]" (PDF). Attorney General's Chambers of Malaysia. 28 May 2018. Archived from the original (PDF) on 2019-07-19. "Damansara parliamentary seat records biggest majority - Nation". The Star Online. 10 May 2018.

Malaysian general election, 1969
Party	Candidate	Votes	%	∆%
DAP	Hor Cheok Foon	15,567	56.29	▲56.29
Alliance	Michael Chen Wing Sum	12,089	43.71	▲2.63
Total valid votes		27,656	100.00	
Total rejected ballots		1,002		
Unreturned ballots		0		
Turnout		28,658	69.34	▼3.18
Registered electors		41,331		
Majority		3,478	12.58	▲9.98
DAP gain from Alliance		Swing		?

Malaysian general election, 1964
Party	Candidate	Votes	%	∆%
Alliance	Michael Chen Wing Sum	9,148	43.68	▼17.81
Socialist Front	Tan Kai Hee	8,602	41.08	▲41.08
PAP	Lam Khuan Kit	3,191	15.24	▲15.24
Total valid votes		20,941	100.00	
Total rejected ballots		856		
Unreturned ballots		0		
Turnout		21,797	72.52	▼2.88
Registered electors		30,056		
Majority		546	2.60	▼20.38
Alliance gain from Socialist Front		Swing		?

Malayan general election, 1959
Party	Candidate	Votes	%
Socialist Front	Karam Singh Veriah	9,026	61.49
Alliance	Lee Eng Teh	5,653	38.51
Total valid votes		14,679	100.00
Total rejected ballots		192	
Unreturned ballots		0	
Turnout		14,871	75.40
Registered electors		19,722	
Majority		3,373	22.98
This was a new constituency created.
