= Petaling Jaya Utara =

Selangor constituency

Defunct federal constituency
- Legislature: Dewan Rakyat
- Constituency created: 1994
- Constituency abolished: 2018
- First contested: 1995
- Last contested: 2013

Petaling Jaya Utara was a federal constituency in Selangor, Malaysia, that was represented in the Dewan Rakyat from 1995 to 2018.

The federal constituency was created in the 1994 redistribution and was mandated to return a single member to the Dewan Rakyat under the first past the post voting system.

== History ==
It was abolished in 2018 when it was redistributed.

=== Representation history ===
Members of Parliament for Petaling Jaya Utara
Parliament	No	Years	Member	Party
Constituency created from Petaling Jaya
9th	P094	1995–1999	Lim Kuo Phau (林国彪)	BN (MCA)
10th	P094	1999–2004	Chew Mei Fun (周美芬)	BN (MCA)
11th	P106	2004–2008	Chew Mei Fun (周美芬)	BN (MCA)
12th	P106	2008–2013	Tony Pua Kiam Wee (潘俭伟)	PR (DAP)
13th	P106	2013–2015	Tony Pua Kiam Wee (潘俭伟)	PR (DAP)
13th	P106	2015–2018	Tony Pua Kiam Wee (潘俭伟)	PH (DAP)
Constituency abolished, split into Petaling Jaya and Damansara

=== State constituency ===
Parliamentary constituency	State constituency						
Parliamentary constituency	1955–59*	1959–1974	1974–1986	1986–1995	1995–2004	2004–2018	2018–present
Petaling Jaya Utara					Damansara Utama		
Petaling Jaya Utara					Kampung Tunku		

=== Historical boundaries ===
State Constituency	Area	
State Constituency	1994	2003
Damansara Utama	Damansara Jaya; Seksyen 17A & 21 Petaling Jaya; SS2 - 4, 20 - 26; Taman Mayang; Taman SEA	Damansara Jaya; Damansara Utama; SS2, 4, 20 - 26; Taman Mayang; Taman SEA
Kampung Tunku	Kampung Tunku; Seksyen 20 Petaling Jaya; SS1, 3, 9 - 9A; Sungai Way; Taman Paramount	Kampung Tunku; Seksyen 20 - 21 Petaling Jaya; SS1, 3 & 9A; Sungai Way; Taman Paramount

== Election results ==
Malaysian general election, 2013: Petaling Jaya Utara
Party	Candidate	Votes	%	∆%
DAP	Tony Pua Kiam Wee	57,407	81.84	▲13.92
BN	Chew Hoong Ling	12,735	18.16	▼13.92
Total valid votes		70,142	100.00	
Total rejected ballots		472		
Unreturned ballots		113		
Turnout		70,727	82.82	▲9.35
Registered electors		85,401		
Majority		44,672	63.68	▲27.84
DAP hold		Swing		+13.92
Source(s) "Federal Government Gazette - Notice of Contested Election, Parliament for the State of Selangor [P.U. (B) 176/2013]" (PDF). Attorney General's Chambers of Malaysia. 26 April 2013. Archived from the original (PDF) on 2018-09-30. "Federal Government Gazette - Results of Contested Election and Statements of the Poll after the Official Addition of Votes, Parliamentary Constituencies for the State of Selangor [P.U. (B) 217/2013]" (PDF). Attorney General's Chambers of Malaysia. 22 May 2013. Archived from the original (PDF) on September 30, 2018.

Malaysian general election, 2008: Petaling Jaya Utara
Party	Candidate	Votes	%	∆%
DAP	Tony Pua Kiam Wee	37,851	67.92	▲30.08
BN	Chew Mei Fun	17,879	32.08	▼30.08
Total valid votes		55,730	100.00	
Total rejected ballots		527		
Unreturned ballots		38		
Turnout		56,295	73.47	▲4.38
Registered electors		76,618		
Majority		19,972	35.84	▲11.52
DAP gain from BN		Swing		+30.08

Malaysian general election, 2004: Petaling Jaya Utara
Party	Candidate	Votes	%	∆%
BN	Chew Mei Fun	32,422	62.16	▲10.36
DAP	Ronnie Liu Tian Khiew	19,739	37.84	▼8.84
Total valid votes		52,161	100.00	
Total rejected ballots		619		
Unreturned ballots		40		
Turnout		52,460	69.09	▼1.67
Registered electors		75,935		
Majority		13,043	24.32	▲19.30
BN hold		Swing		+9.60

Malaysian general election, 1999: Petaling Jaya Utara
Party	Candidate	Votes	%	∆%
BN	Chew Mei Fun	25,603	51.80	▲51.80
DAP	Ronnie Liu Tian Khiew	23,122	46.78	▲46.78
MDP	Wee Chek Aik	706	1.43	▲1.43
Total valid votes		49,431	100.00	
Total rejected ballots		517		
Unreturned ballots		33		
Turnout		49,981	70.76	
Registered electors		70,634		
Majority		2,481	5.02	
BN hold		Swing		N/A

Malaysian general election, 1995: Petaling Jaya Utara
Party	Candidate	Votes	%	∆%
On the nomination day, Lim Kuo Phau won uncontested.
BN	Lim Kuo Phau			
Total valid votes			100.00	
Total rejected ballots				
Unreturned ballots				
Turnout				
Registered electors		68,828		
Majority				
This was a new constituency created.

1995 electors data sourced from Tindak Malaysia's GitHub
