= List of parliamentary secretaries of Malaysia =

During the Tunku Abdul Rahman's term as Prime Minister of Malaysia, the Parliamentary Secretaries was appointed to assist the full Ministers in select areas of their Ministries but are not members of the cabinet. Their duty was to answer questions and table reports on behalf of ministers when they were unable to be present in the house. The tradition of the Prime Minister to appoint the Parliamentary Secretary was continued until the position was removed in the Third Abdullah cabinet after the 2008 Malaysian general election. The partial live telecasts of Parliament proceedings began in 2008 to allow the public to watch the Ministers or Deputy Ministers personally answering questions during Question Time in Parliament.

== Second Abdullah cabinet ==
=== Original composition ===
Office	Incumbent	Party	Constituency
Parliamentary Secretary to the Prime Minister's Department	Mohd Johari Baharum MP	UMNO	Kubang Pasu
Parliamentary Secretary to the Prime Minister's Department	Mashitah Ibrahim MP	UMNO	Baling
Parliamentary Secretary to the Minister of Finance	Hilmi Yahaya MP	UMNO	Balik Pulau
Parliamentary Secretary to the Minister of Internal Security	Abu Seman Yusop MP	UMNO	Masjid Tanah
Parliamentary Secretary to the Minister of Housing and Local Government	Subramaniam Sathasivam MP	MIC	Segamat
Parliamentary Secretary to the Minister of Works	Yong Khoon Seng MP	SUPP	Stampin
Parliamentary Secretary to the Minister of International Trade and Industry	Tan Yee Kew MP	MCA	Klang
Parliamentary Secretary to the Minister of Foreign Affairs	Zainal Abidin Osman MP	UMNO	Nibong Tebal
Parliamentary Secretary to the Minister of Agriculture and Agro-based Industry	Rohani Abdul Karim MP	PBB	Batang Lupar
Parliamentary Secretary to the Minister of Information	Noriah Kasnon MP	UMNO	Sungai Besar
Parliamentary Secretary to the Minister of Home Affairs	Abdul Rahman Ibrahim MP	UMNO	Pokok Sena
Parliamentary Secretary to the Minister of Education	P. Komala Devi MP	MIC	Kapar
Parliamentary Secretary to the Minister of Women, Family and Community Development	Chew Mei Fun MP	MCA	Petaling Jaya Utara
Parliamentary Secretary to the Minister of Science, Technology and Innovation	Mohd. Ruddin Ab. Ghani MP	UMNO	Bukit Katil
Parliamentary Secretary to the Minister of Domestic Trade and Consumer Affairs	Hoo Seong Chang MP	MCA	Kluang
Parliamentary Secretary to the Minister of Federal Territories	Yew Teong Look MP	MCA	Wangsa Maju
Parliamentary Secretary to the Minister of Plantation Industries and Commodities	Ng Lip Yong MP	GERAKAN	Batu
Parliamentary Secretary to the Minister of Higher Education	Adham Baba MP	UMNO	Tenggara
Parliamentary Secretary to the Minister of Entrepreneur and Co-operatives Development	Samsu Baharun Abdul Rahman MP	UMNO	Silam
Parliamentary Secretary to the Minister of Natural Resources and Environment	Sazmi Miah MP	UMNO	Machang
Parliamentary Secretary to the Minister of Health	Lee Kah Choon MP	GERAKAN	Jelutong
Parliamentary Secretary to the Minister of Youth and Sports	S. Vigneswaran M. Sanasee MP	MIC	Kota Raja

=== Composition before cabinet dissolution ===
Office	Incumbent	Party	Constituency
Parliamentary Secretary to the Prime Minister's Department	Mashitah Ibrahim MP	UMNO	Baling
Parliamentary Secretary to the Minister of Finance	Hilmi Yahaya MP	UMNO	Balik Pulau
Parliamentary Secretary to the Minister of Housing and Local Government	Subramaniam Sathasivam MP	MIC	Segamat
Parliamentary Secretary to the Minister of Works	Yong Khoon Seng MP	SUPP	Stampin
Parliamentary Secretary to the Minister of International Trade and Industry	Tan Yee Kew MP	MCA	Klang
Parliamentary Secretary to the Minister of Foreign Affairs	Ahmad Shabery Cheek MP	UMNO	Kemaman
Parliamentary Secretary to the Minister of Agriculture and Agro-based Industry	Rohani Abdul Karim MP	PBB	Batang Lupar
Parliamentary Secretary to the Minister of Information	Noriah Kasnon MP	UMNO	Sungai Besar
Parliamentary Secretary to the Minister of Home Affairs	Abdul Rahman Ibrahim MP	UMNO	Pokok Sena
Parliamentary Secretary to the Minister of Education	P. Komala Devi MP	MIC	Kapar
Parliamentary Secretary to the Minister of Women, Family and Community Development	Chew Mei Fun MP	MCA	Petaling Jaya Utara
Parliamentary Secretary to the Minister of Science, Technology and Innovation	Mohd. Ruddin Ab. Ghani MP	UMNO	Bukit Katil
Parliamentary Secretary to the Minister of Domestic Trade and Consumer Affairs	Hoo Seong Chang MP	MCA	Kluang
Parliamentary Secretary to the Minister of Federal Territories	Yew Teong Look MP	MCA	Wangsa Maju
Parliamentary Secretary to the Minister of Plantation Industries and Commodities	Senator S. Vijayaratnam MP	GERAKAN	
Parliamentary Secretary to the Minister of Higher Education	Adham Baba MP	UMNO	Tenggara
Parliamentary Secretary to the Minister of Entrepreneur and Co-operatives Development	Samsu Baharun Abdul Rahman MP	UMNO	Silam
Parliamentary Secretary to the Minister of Natural Resources and Environment	Sazmi Miah MP	UMNO	Machang
Parliamentary Secretary to the Minister of Health	Lee Kah Choon MP	GERAKAN	Jelutong
Parliamentary Secretary to the Minister of Youth and Sports	S. Vigneswaran M. Sanasee MP	MIC	Kota Raja

== First Abdullah cabinet ==
=== Original composition ===
Office	Incumbent	Party	Constituency
Parliamentary Secretary to the Minister of Agriculture	Abu Bakar Taib MP	UMNO	Langkawi
Parliamentary Secretary to the Minister of Home Affairs	Abu Zahar Ithnin MP	UMNO	Jasin
Parliamentary Secretary to the Prime Minister's Department	Khamsiyah Yeop MP	UMNO	Gerik
Parliamentary Secretary to the Prime Minister's Department	Noh Omar MP	UMNO	Tanjong Karang
Parliamentary Secretary to the Minister of Works	Yong Khoon Seng MP	SUPP	Stampin
Parliamentary Secretary to the Minister of Finance	Hashim Ismail MP	UMNO	Ledang
Parliamentary Secretary to the Minister of Energy, Communications and Multimedia	Chia Kwang Chye MP	GERAKAN	Bukit Bendera
Parliamentary Secretary to the Minister of Domestic Trade and Consumer Affairs	Wong Kam Hoong MP	MCA	Bayan Baru
Parliamentary Secretary to the Minister of Health	S. Sothinathan MP	MIC	Telok Kemang
Parliamentary Secretary to the Minister of Lands and Co-operatives Development	Robia Kosai MP	UMNO	Muar
Parliamentary Secretary to the Minister of National Unity and Community Development	S. Veerasingam MP	MIC	Tapah
Parliamentary Secretary to the Minister of Entrepreneur Development	Rizalman Abdullah MP	UMNO	Tenom
Parliamentary Secretary to the Minister of Rural Development	Rohani Abdul Karim MP	PBB	Santubong
Parliamentary Secretary to the Minister of Education	Mahadzir Mohd Khir MP	UMNO	Sungai Petani
Parliamentary Secretary to the Minister of International Trade and Industry	Ho Cheong Sing MP	MCA	Ipoh Barat
Parliamentary Secretary to the Minister of Women and Family Development	Mastika Junaidah Husin MP	UMNO	Arau

=== Composition before cabinet dissolution ===
Office	Incumbent	Party	Constituency
Parliamentary Secretary to the Minister of Agriculture	Abu Bakar Taib MP	UMNO	Langkawi
Parliamentary Secretary to the Minister of Home Affairs	Abu Zahar Ithnin MP	UMNO	Jasin
Parliamentary Secretary to the Prime Minister's Department	Khamsiyah Yeop MP	UMNO	Gerik
Parliamentary Secretary to the Prime Minister's Department	Noh Omar MP	UMNO	Tanjong Karang
Parliamentary Secretary to the Minister of Works	Yong Khoon Seng MP	SUPP	Stampin
Parliamentary Secretary to the Minister of Finance	Hashim Ismail MP	UMNO	Ledang
Parliamentary Secretary to the Minister of Energy, Communications and Multimedia	Chia Kwang Chye MP	GERAKAN	Bukit Bendera
Parliamentary Secretary to the Minister of Domestic Trade and Consumer Affairs	Wong Kam Hoong MP	MCA	Bayan Baru
Parliamentary Secretary to the Minister of Health	S. Sothinathan MP	MIC	Telok Kemang
Parliamentary Secretary to the Minister of Lands and Co-operatives Development	Robia Kosai MP	UMNO	Muar
Parliamentary Secretary to the Minister of National Unity and Community Development	S. Veerasingam MP	MIC	Tapah
Parliamentary Secretary to the Minister of Entrepreneur Development	Rizalman Abdullah MP	UMNO	Tenom
Parliamentary Secretary to the Minister of Rural Development	Rohani Abdul Karim MP	PBB	Santubong
Parliamentary Secretary to the Minister of Education	Mahadzir Mohd Khir MP	UMNO	Sungai Petani
Parliamentary Secretary to the Minister of International Trade and Industry	Ho Cheong Sing MP	MCA	Ipoh Barat
Parliamentary Secretary to the Minister of Women and Family Development	Mastika Junaidah Husin MP	UMNO	Arau

== Sixth Mahathir cabinet ==
=== Original composition ===
Office	Incumbent	Party	Constituency
Parliamentary Secretary to the Minister of Agriculture	Abu Bakar Taib MP	UMNO	Langkawi
Parliamentary Secretary to the Minister of Home Affairs	Abu Zahar Ithnin MP	UMNO	Jasin
Parliamentary Secretary to the Prime Minister's Department	Khamsiyah Yeop MP	UMNO	Gerik
Parliamentary Secretary to the Prime Minister's Department	Noh Omar MP	UMNO	Tanjong Karang
Parliamentary Secretary to the Minister of Transport	Donald Lim Siang Chai MP	MCA	Petaling Jaya Selatan
Parliamentary Secretary to the Minister of Works	Yong Khoon Seng MP	SUPP	Stampin
Parliamentary Secretary to the Minister of Finance	Hashim Ismail MP	UMNO	Ledang
Parliamentary Secretary to the Minister of Energy, Communications and Multimedia	Chia Kwang Chye MP	GERAKAN	Bukit Bendera
Parliamentary Secretary to the Minister of Domestic Trade and Consumer Affairs	Wong Kam Hoong MP	MCA	Bayan Baru
Parliamentary Secretary to the Minister of Health	S. A. Anpalagan MP	MIC	Telok Kemang
Parliamentary Secretary to the Minister of Lands and Co-operatives Development	Robia Kosai MP	UMNO	Muar
Parliamentary Secretary to the Minister of National Unity and Community Development	S. Veerasingam MP	MIC	Tapah
Parliamentary Secretary to the Minister of Entrepreneur Development	Rizalman Abdullah MP	UMNO	Tenom
Parliamentary Secretary to the Minister of Rural Development	Rohani Abdul Karim MP	PBB	Santubong
Parliamentary Secretary to the Minister of Education	Mahadzir Mohd Khir MP	UMNO	Sungai Petani

=== Composition before cabinet dissolution ===
Office	Incumbent	Party	Constituency
Parliamentary Secretary to the Minister of Agriculture	Abu Bakar Taib MP	UMNO	Langkawi
Parliamentary Secretary to the Minister of Home Affairs	Abu Zahar Ithnin MP	UMNO	Jasin
Parliamentary Secretary to the Prime Minister's Department	Khamsiyah Yeop MP	UMNO	Gerik
Parliamentary Secretary to the Prime Minister's Department	Noh Omar MP	UMNO	Tanjong Karang
Parliamentary Secretary to the Minister of Works	Yong Khoon Seng MP	SUPP	Stampin
Parliamentary Secretary to the Minister of Finance	Hashim Ismail MP	UMNO	Ledang
Parliamentary Secretary to the Minister of Energy, Communications and Multimedia	Chia Kwang Chye MP	GERAKAN	Bukit Bendera
Parliamentary Secretary to the Minister of Domestic Trade and Consumer Affairs	Wong Kam Hoong MP	MCA	Bayan Baru
Parliamentary Secretary to the Minister of Health	S. Sothinathan MP	MIC	Telok Kemang
Parliamentary Secretary to the Minister of Lands and Co-operatives Development	Robia Kosai MP	UMNO	Muar
Parliamentary Secretary to the Minister of National Unity and Community Development	S. Veerasingam MP	MIC	Tapah
Parliamentary Secretary to the Minister of Information	Rizalman Abdullah MP	UMNO	Tenom
Parliamentary Secretary to the Minister of Rural Development	Rohani Abdul Karim MP	PBB	Santubong
Parliamentary Secretary to the Minister of Education	Mahadzir Mohd Khir MP	UMNO	Sungai Petani
Parliamentary Secretary to the Minister of International Trade and Industry	Ho Cheong Sing MP	MCA	Ipoh Barat
Parliamentary Secretary to the Minister of Women and Family Development	Mastika Junaidah Husin MP	UMNO	Arau

== Fifth Mahathir cabinet ==
=== Original composition ===
Office	Incumbent	Party	Constituency
Parliamentary Secretary to the Minister of Health	M. Mahalingam MP	MIC	Subang
Parliamentary Secretary to the Minister of Culture, Arts and Tourism	Mohd. Noh Rajab MP	UMNO	Tampin
Parliamentary Secretary to the Minister of Rural Development	Douglas Uggah Embas MP	PBB	Betong
Parliamentary Secretary to the Minister of Works	Yong Khoon Seng MP	SUPP	Padawan
Parliamentary Secretary to the Minister of Lands and Co-operatives Development	Fauzi Abdul Rahman MP	UMNO	Kuantan
Parliamentary Secretary to the Prime Minister's Department	Muhammad Abdullah MP	UMNO	Maran
Parliamentary Secretary to the Prime Minister's Department	Azmi Khalid MP	UMNO	Padang Besar
Parliamentary Secretary to the Minister of Finance	Shafie Salleh MP	UMNO	Kuala Langat
Parliamentary Secretary to the Minister of Transport	Chor Chee Heung MP	MCA	Alor Setar
Parliamentary Secretary to the Minister of International Trade and Industry	Hishammuddin Hussein MP	UMNO	Tenggara
Parliamentary Secretary to the Minister of Agriculture	Abu Bakar Taib MP	UMNO	Langkawi
Parliamentary Secretary to the Minister of Domestic Trade and Consumer Affairs	Tan Chai Ho MP	MCA	Bandar Tun Razak
Parliamentary Secretary to the Minister of Information	Shafie Apdal MP	UMNO	Semporna
Parliamentary Secretary to the Minister of Youth and Sports	Shahrizat Abdul Jalil MP	UMNO	Lembah Pantai
Parliamentary Secretary to the Minister of National Unity and Community Development	Palanivel Govindasamy MP	MIC	Hulu Selangor

=== Composition before cabinet dissolution ===
Office	Incumbent	Party	Constituency
Parliamentary Secretary to the Minister of Health	M. Mahalingam MP	MIC	Subang
Parliamentary Secretary to the Minister of Culture, Arts and Tourism	Mohd. Noh Rajab MP	UMNO	Tampin
Parliamentary Secretary to the Minister of Rural Development	Douglas Uggah Embas MP	PBB	Betong
Parliamentary Secretary to the Minister of Works	Yong Khoon Seng MP	SUPP	Padawan
Parliamentary Secretary to the Prime Minister's Department	Muhammad Abdullah MP	UMNO	Maran
Parliamentary Secretary to the Minister of Finance	Shafie Salleh MP	UMNO	Kuala Langat
Parliamentary Secretary to the Minister of Transport	Chor Chee Heung MP	MCA	Alor Setar
Parliamentary Secretary to the Minister of Agriculture	Abu Bakar Taib MP	UMNO	Langkawi
Parliamentary Secretary to the Minister of Domestic Trade and Consumer Affairs	Tan Chai Ho MP	MCA	Bandar Tun Razak
Parliamentary Secretary to the Minister of Youth and Sports	Shahrizat Abdul Jalil MP	UMNO	Lembah Pantai
Parliamentary Secretary to the Minister of National Unity and Community Development	Palanivel Govindasamy MP	MIC	Hulu Selangor
Parliamentary Secretary to the Prime Minister's Department	Othman Abdul MP	UMNO	Pendang
Parliamentary Secretary to the Minister of International Trade and Industry	Ahmad Kamaruzaman Mohamed Baria MP	UMNO	Jerantut
Parliamentary Secretary to the Minister of Lands and Co-operatives Development	Ainon Khairiyah Mohd. Abas MP	UMNO	Parit

== Fourth Mahathir cabinet ==
=== Original composition ===
Office	Incumbent	Party	Constituency
Parliamentary Secretary to the Minister of Culture, Arts and Tourism	Abdul Raman Suliman MP	UMNO	Parit Buntar
Parliamentary Secretary to the Prime Minister's Department	Othman Abdul MP	UMNO	Pendang
Parliamentary Secretary to the Minister of Rural Development	Mohamed Jamrah MP	UMNO	Bagan Datok
Parliamentary Secretary to the Minister of Youth and Sports	Ismail @ Mansor Said MP	UMNO	Kemaman
Parliamentary Secretary to the Minister of Lands and Co-operatives Development	Mohd. Noh Rajab MP	UMNO	Tampin
Parliamentary Secretary to the Prime Minister's Department	Douglas Uggah Embas MP	PBB	Betong
Parliamentary Secretary to the Minister of Agriculture	Mohd Shariff Omar MP	UMNO	Tasek Gelugor
Parliamentary Secretary to the Minister of National Unity and Community Development	Yong Khoon Seng MP	SUPP	Padawan
Parliamentary Secretary to the Minister of Health	Ong Ka Ting MP	MCA	Pontian
Parliamentary Secretary to the Minister of Information	Fauzi Abdul Rahman MP	UMNO	Kuantan
Parliamentary Secretary to the Minister of International Trade and Industry	Senator K. S. Nijhar	MIC	

=== Composition before cabinet dissolution ===
Office	Incumbent	Party	Constituency
Parliamentary Secretary to the Minister of Culture, Arts and Tourism	Abdul Raman Suliman MP	UMNO	Parit Buntar
Parliamentary Secretary to the Prime Minister's Department	Othman Abdul MP	UMNO	Pendang
Parliamentary Secretary to the Minister of Rural Development	Mohamed Jamrah MP	UMNO	Bagan Datok
Parliamentary Secretary to the Minister of Youth and Sports	Ismail @ Mansor Said MP	UMNO	Kemaman
Parliamentary Secretary to the Minister of Lands and Co-operatives Development	Mohd. Noh Rajab MP	UMNO	Tampin
Parliamentary Secretary to the Prime Minister's Department	Douglas Uggah Embas MP	PBB	Betong
Parliamentary Secretary to the Minister of Agriculture	Mohd Shariff Omar MP	UMNO	Tasek Gelugor
Parliamentary Secretary to the Minister of National Unity and Community Development	Yong Khoon Seng MP	SUPP	Padawan
Parliamentary Secretary to the Minister of Home Affairs	Ong Ka Ting MP	MCA	Pontian
Parliamentary Secretary to the Minister of Information	Fauzi Abdul Rahman MP	UMNO	Kuantan
Parliamentary Secretary to the Minister of Health	K. Kumaran MP	MIC	Tapah
Parliamentary Secretary to the Minister of International Trade and Industry	Subramaniam Sinniah MP	MIC	Segamat
Parliamentary Secretary to the Minister of Finance	Affifudin Omar MP	UMNO	Padang Terap
Parliamentary Secretary to the Minister of Domestic Trade and Consumer Affairs	Senator Sak Cheng Lum	MCA	

== Third Mahathir cabinet ==
=== Original composition ===
Office	Incumbent	Party	Constituency
Parliamentary Secretary to the Minister of Science, Technology and Environment	Law Hieng Ding MP	SUPP	Sarikei
Parliamentary Secretary to the Minister of Culture, Youth and Sports	Awang Jabar MP	UMNO	Dungun
Parliamentary Secretary to the Minister of Information	Dusuki Ahmad MP	UMNO	Tumpat
Parliamentary Secretary to the Minister of Lands and Regional Development	Zaleha Ismail MP	UMNO	Selayang
Parliamentary Secretary to the Minister of National and Rural Development	Alias Md. Ali MP	UMNO	Hulu Terengganu
Parliamentary Secretary to the Minister of Health	Teng Gaik Kwan MP	MCA	Raub
Parliamentary Secretary to the Prime Minister's Department	Raja Ariffin Raja Sulaiman MP	UMNO	Baling
Parliamentary Secretary to the Minister of Social Welfare	Peter Chin Fah Kui MP	SUPP	Lambir
Parliamentary Secretary to the Minister of Energy, Telecommunications and Posts	Ong Tin Kim MP	GERAKAN	Telok Intan

=== Composition before cabinet dissolution ===
Office	Incumbent	Party	Constituency
Parliamentary Secretary to the Minister of Youth and Sports	Awang Jabar MP	UMNO	Dungun
Parliamentary Secretary to the Minister of Information	Dusuki Ahmad MP	UMNO	Tumpat
Parliamentary Secretary to the Minister of Social Welfare	Peter Chin Fah Kui MP	SUPP	Lambir
Parliamentary Secretary to the Minister of Agriculture	Ong Tin Kim MP	GERAKAN	Telok Intan
Parliamentary Secretary to the Minister of Culture and Tourism	Abdul Raman Suliman MP	UMNO	Parit Buntar
Parliamentary Secretary to the Prime Minister's Department	Othman Abdul MP	UMNO	Pendang
Parliamentary Secretary to the Minister of National and Rural Development	Mohamed Jamrah MP	UMNO	Bagan Datok
Parliamentary Secretary to the Minister of Lands and Regional Development	Adam Abdul Kadir MP	UMNO	Kuantan
Parliamentary Secretary to the Minister of Health	Chua Jui Meng MP	MCA	Bakri
Parliamentary Secretary to the Minister of Trade and Industry	Senator K. S. Nijhar	MIC	

== Second Mahathir cabinet ==
=== Original composition ===
Office	Incumbent	Party	Constituency
Parliamentary Secretary to the Minister of Science, Technology and Environment	Law Hieng Ding MP	SUPP	Sarikei
Parliamentary Secretary to the Minister of General Welfare	Jawan Empaling MP	SUPP	Rajang
Parliamentary Secretary to the Minister of Public Enterprises	Hussein Mahmud MP	UMNO	Tanah Merah
Parliamentary Secretary to the Minister of Health	Lee Boon Peng MP	MCA	Mantin
Parliamentary Secretary to the Minister of Energy, Telecommunications and Posts	Au How Cheong MP	GERAKAN	Telok Anson
Parliamentary Secretary to the Minister of Culture, Youth and Sports	Ting Ling Kiew MP	SNAP	Bintulu
Parliamentary Secretary to the Minister of Foreign Affairs	Abdul Kadir Sheikh Fadzir MP	UMNO	Kulim-Bandar Baharu
Parliamentary Secretary to the Minister of Lands and Regional Development	Zainal Abidin Zin MP	UMNO	Bagan Serai
Parliamentary Secretary to the Minister of National and Rural Development	Mohd Radzi Sheikh Ahmad MP	UMNO	Kangar

=== Composition before cabinet dissolution ===
Office	Incumbent	Party	Constituency
Parliamentary Secretary to the Minister of Science, Technology and Environment	Law Hieng Ding MP	SUPP	Sarikei
Parliamentary Secretary to the Minister of Social Welfare	Jawan Empaling MP	SUPP	Rajang
Parliamentary Secretary to the Minister of Public Enterprises	Hussein Mahmud MP	UMNO	Tanah Merah
Parliamentary Secretary to the Minister of Energy, Telecommunications and Posts	Au How Cheong MP	GERAKAN	Telok Anson
Parliamentary Secretary to the Minister of National and Rural Development	Tajol Rosli Mohd Ghazali MP	UMNO	Gerik
Parliamentary Secretary to the Minister of Culture, Youth and Sports	Awang Jabar MP	UMNO	Dungun
Parliamentary Secretary to the Prime Minister's Department	Mustaffa Mohammad MP	UMNO	Sri Gading
Parliamentary Secretary to the Minister of Lands and Regional Development	Dusuki Ahmad MP	UMNO	Tumpat
Parliamentary Secretary to the Minister of Health	Ban Hon Keong MP	MCA	Batu Gajah

== First Mahathir cabinet ==
=== Original composition ===
Office	Incumbent	Party	Constituency
Parliamentary Secretary to the Minister of Culture, Youth and Sports	Luhat Wan MP	SNAP	Baram
Parliamentary Secretary to the Minister of General Welfare	Jawan Empaling MP	SUPP	Rajang
Parliamentary Secretary to the Minister of Agriculture	Mohd. Kassim Ahmed MP	UMNO	Machang
Parliamentary Secretary to the Minister of Health	Rosemary Chow Poh Kheng MP	MCA	Ulu Langat
Parliamentary Secretary to the Minister of Housing and Local Government	V. Govindaraj MP	MIC	Pelabohan Kelang
Parliamentary Secretary to the Minister of Public Enterprises	Hussein Mahmud MP	UMNO	Tanah Merah
Parliamentary Secretary to the Minister of Lands and Regional Development	Shariffah Dorah Syed Mohammed MP	UMNO	Semerah
Parliamentary Secretary to the Minister of Foreign Affairs	Muhyiddin Yassin MP	UMNO	Pagoh
Parliamentary Secretary to the Minister of Science, Technology and Environment	Senator Law Hieng Ding	SUPP	

=== Composition before cabinet dissolution ===
Office	Incumbent	Party	Constituency
Parliamentary Secretary to the Minister of Culture, Youth and Sports	Luhat Wan MP	SNAP	Baram
Parliamentary Secretary to the Minister of General Welfare	Jawan Empaling MP	SUPP	Rajang
Parliamentary Secretary to the Minister of Agriculture	Mohd. Kassim Ahmed MP	UMNO	Machang
Parliamentary Secretary to the Minister of Health	Rosemary Chow Poh Kheng MP	MCA	Ulu Langat
Parliamentary Secretary to the Minister of Housing and Local Government	V. Govindaraj MP	MIC	Pelabohan Kelang
Parliamentary Secretary to the Minister of Public Enterprises	Hussein Mahmud MP	UMNO	Tanah Merah
Parliamentary Secretary to the Minister of Lands and Regional Development	Shariffah Dorah Syed Mohammed MP	UMNO	Semerah
Parliamentary Secretary to the Minister of Foreign Affairs	Muhyiddin Yassin MP	UMNO	Pagoh
Parliamentary Secretary to the Minister of Science, Technology and Environment	Senator Law Hieng Ding	SUPP	

== Second Hussein cabinet ==
=== Original composition ===
Office	Incumbent	Party	Constituency
Parliamentary Secretary to the Minister of General Welfare	Patrick Uren MP	SNAP	Mas Gading
Parliamentary Secretary to the Minister of Culture, Youth and Sports	Luhat Wan MP	SNAP	Baram
Parliamentary Secretary to the Minister of Health	Jawan Empaling MP	SUPP	Rajang
Parliamentary Secretary to the Minister of Defence	Abdul Jalal Abu Bakar MP	UMNO	Batu Pahat
Parliamentary Secretary to the Minister of Information	Embong Yahya MP	UMNO	Ledang
Parliamentary Secretary to the Prime Minister's Department	Shahrir Abdul Samad MP	UMNO	Johor Bahru
Parliamentary Secretary to the Minister of Federal Territories	Abdullah Ahmad Badawi MP	UMNO	Kepala Batas
Parliamentary Secretary to the Minister of Commerce and Industry	Abu Hassan Omar MP	UMNO	Kuala Selangor
Parliamentary Secretary to the Minister of Public Enterprises	Idris Abdul Rauf MP	UMNO	Parit Buntar
Parliamentary Secretary to the Minister of Primary Industries	Abdul Rahim Thamby Chik MP	UMNO	Alor Gajah
Parliamentary Secretary to the Minister of Works and Public Amenities	William Lye Chee Hien MP	BERJAYA	Gaya
Parliamentary Secretary to the Minister of Foreign Affairs	Mohd. Kassim Ahmed MP	UMNO	Machang
Parliamentary Secretary to the Minister of Science, Technology and Environment	Senator Law Hieng Ding	SUPP	

=== Composition before cabinet dissolution ===
Office	Incumbent	Party	Constituency
Parliamentary Secretary to the Minister of Culture, Youth and Sports	Luhat Wan MP	SNAP	Baram
Parliamentary Secretary to the Minister of General Welfare	Jawan Empaling MP	SUPP	Rajang
Parliamentary Secretary to the Minister of Lands and Regional Development	Abdul Jalal Abu Bakar MP	UMNO	Batu Pahat
Parliamentary Secretary to the Minister of Public Enterprises	Idris Abdul Rauf MP	UMNO	Parit Buntar
Parliamentary Secretary to the Minister of Commerce and Industry	Abdul Rahim Thamby Chik MP	UMNO	Alor Gajah
Parliamentary Secretary to the Minister of Foreign Affairs	Mohd. Kassim Ahmed MP	UMNO	Machang
Parliamentary Secretary to the Minister of Health	Rosemary Chow Poh Kheng MP	MCA	Ulu Langat
Parliamentary Secretary to the Minister of Housing and Local Government	V. Govindaraj MP	MIC	Pelabohan Kelang
Parliamentary Secretary to the Minister of Science, Technology and Environment	Senator Law Hieng Ding	SUPP	

== First Hussein cabinet ==
=== Original composition ===
Office	Incumbent	Party	Constituency
Parliamentary Secretary to the Minister of Labour and Manpower	Subramaniam Sinniah MP	MIC	Damansara
Parliamentary Secretary to the Minister of Commerce and Industry	Mustafa Ali MP	PAS	Kuala Trengganu
Parliamentary Secretary to the Minister of Primary Industries	Lew Sip Hon MP	MCA	Shah Alam
Parliamentary Secretary to the Minister of Local Government and Federal Territories	Ling Liong Sik MP	MCA	Mata Kuching
Parliamentary Secretary to the Minister of Foreign Affairs	Mohd. Zahari Awang MP	PAS	Kuala Krai
Parliamentary Secretary to the Minister of Science, Technology and Environment	Senator Law Hieng Ding	SUPP	

=== Composition before cabinet dissolution ===
Office	Incumbent	Party	Constituency
Parliamentary Secretary to the Minister of General Welfare	Patrick Uren MP	SNAP	Bau-Lundu
Parliamentary Secretary to the Minister of Foreign Affairs	Zakaria Abdul Rahman MP	UMNO	Besut
Parliamentary Secretary to the Minister of Communications	Luhat Wan MP	SNAP	Baram
Parliamentary Secretary to the Minister of Health	Jawan Empaling MP	SUPP	Rajang
Parliamentary Secretary to the Minister of Defence	Abdul Jalal Abu Bakar MP	UMNO	Batu Pahat
Parliamentary Secretary to the Minister of Lands and Regional Development	Embong Yahya MP	UMNO	Ledang
Parliamentary Secretary to the Minister of Culture, Youth and Sports	Saadun Muhammad Noh MP	UMNO	Panti
Parliamentary Secretary to the Minister of Science, Technology and Environment	Senator Law Hieng Ding	SUPP	

== Second Razak cabinet ==
=== Original composition ===
Office	Incumbent	Party	Constituency
Parliamentary Secretary to the Minister of Communications	Ramli Omar MP	UMNO	Bagan Serai
Parliamentary Secretary to the Prime Minister	Abdullah Majid MP	UMNO	Raub
Parliamentary Secretary to the Minister of Labour and Manpower	Subramaniam Sinniah MP	MIC	Damansara
Parliamentary Secretary to the Minister of Commerce and Industry	Mustafa Ali MP	PAS	Kuala Trengganu
Parliamentary Secretary to the Prime Minister	Goh Cheng Teik MP	GERAKAN	Nibong Tebal
Parliamentary Secretary to the Minister of Energy, Technology and Research	Neo Yee Pan MP	MCA	Muar
Parliamentary Secretary to the Minister of Housing and New Villages	Mohd Ali M. Shariff MP	UMNO	Kuantan
Parliamentary Secretary to the Minister of Culture, Youth and Sports	Rais Yatim MP	UMNO	Jelebu
Parliamentary Secretary to the Minister of Local Government and Environment	Senator Law Hieng Ding	SUPP	

=== Composition before cabinet dissolution ===
Office	Incumbent	Party	Constituency
Parliamentary Secretary to the Minister of Communications	Ramli Omar MP	UMNO	Bagan Serai
Parliamentary Secretary to the Prime Minister	Abdullah Majid MP	UMNO	Raub
Parliamentary Secretary to the Minister of Labour and Manpower	Subramaniam Sinniah MP	MIC	Damansara
Parliamentary Secretary to the Minister of Commerce and Industry	Mustafa Ali MP	PAS	Kuala Trengganu
Parliamentary Secretary to the Prime Minister	Goh Cheng Teik MP	GERAKAN	Nibong Tebal
Parliamentary Secretary to the Minister of Energy, Technology and Research	Neo Yee Pan MP	MCA	Muar
Parliamentary Secretary to the Minister of Housing and New Villages	Mohd Ali M. Shariff MP	UMNO	Kuantan
Parliamentary Secretary to the Minister of Culture, Youth and Sports	Rais Yatim MP	UMNO	Jelebu
Parliamentary Secretary to the Minister of Local Government and Environment	Senator Law Hieng Ding	SUPP	

== First Razak cabinet ==
=== Original composition ===
Office	Incumbent	Party	Constituency
Parliamentary Secretary to the Minister of Information	Shariff Ahmad MP	UMNO	Langat
Parliamentary Secretary to the Prime Minister	Wan Abdul Kadir Ismail MP	UMNO	Kuala Trengganu Utara
Parliamentary Secretary to the Minister of Transport	Mohamed Ujang MP	UMNO	Jelebu-Jempol
Parliamentary Secretary to the Minister of Education	Mohamed Rahmat MP	UMNO	Johor Bahru Barat

=== Composition before cabinet dissolution ===
Office	Incumbent	Party	Constituency
Parliamentary Secretary to the Minister of Lands Development	Mohamed Ujang MP	UMNO	Jelebu-Jempol
Parliamentary Secretary to the Minister of Labour and Manpower	Ramli Omar MP	UMNO	Krian Darat
Parliamentary Secretary to the Minister of Culture, Youth and Sports	Mokhtar Hashim MP	UMNO	Rembau-Tampin
Parliamentary Secretary to the Minister of Rural Economy Development	Mustapha Abdul Jabar MP	UMNO	Sabak Bernam
Parliamentary Secretary to the Minister of Local Government and Housing	Senator Law Hieng Ding	SUPP	

== Third Rahman cabinet ==
=== Composition before cabinet dissolution ===
Office	Incumbent	Party	Constituency
Parliamentary Secretary to the Minister of Health	Ibrahim Abdul Rahman MP	UMNO	Seberang Tengah
Parliamentary Secretary to the Minister of Labour	Lee San Choon MP	MCA	Segamat Selatan
Parliamentary Secretary to the Minister of Finance	Ali Ahmad MP	UMNO	Pontian Selatan
Parliamentary Secretary to the Deputy Prime Minister	Michael Chen Wing Sum MP	MCA	Damansara

== See also ==
- List of members of the Dewan Rakyat
