= Stampin (disambiguation) =

Stampin may refer to:

- Stampin
- Stampin (federal constituency), represented in the Dewan Rakyat
- Stampin (state constituency), formerly represented in the Sarawak State Legislative Assembly (1979–91), see 1979 Sarawak state election
