= Petaling Jaya (disambiguation) =

Petaling Jaya may refer to:

- Petaling Jaya
- Petaling Jaya (federal constituency), formerly represented in the Dewan Rakyat (1986–95)
- Petaling Jaya Selatan (federal constituency), represented in the Dewan Rakyat
- Petaling Jaya Utara (federal constituency), represented in the Dewan Rakyat
- Petaling Jaya (state constituency), formerly represented in the Selangor State Legislative Assembly (1974–86)

== See also ==
- Petaling (disambiguation)
