= Donald Lim =

Malaysian politician

Yang Berbahagia Dato' Donald Lim DPMS
- 林祥才

Senator

Elected by Yang di-Pertuan Agong
- Prime Minister: Najib Razak

Deputy Minister of Finance II
- In office 4 June 2010 – 15 May 2013 Serving with Awang Adek Hussin (Deputy Minister of Finance I)
- Preceded by: Chor Chee Heung
- Succeeded by: Ahmad Maslan
- Constituency: Senator

Deputy Minister of Tourism
- In office 14 February 2006 – 18 March 2008
- Minister: Tengku Adnan Tengku Mansor
- Preceded by: Ahmad Zahid Hamidi
- Succeeded by: Sulaiman Abdul Rahman Taib
- Constituency: Petaling Jaya Selatan

Deputy Minister of Information II
- In office 3 November 2003 – 14 February 2006 Serving with Zainuddin Maidin
- Minister: Mohd Khalil Yaakob (2003–2004); Abdul Kadir Sheikh Fadzir (2004–2006)
- Preceded by: Zainuddin Maidin
- Succeeded by: Chia Kwang Chye
- Constituency: Petaling Jaya Selatan

Parliamentary Secretary of the Ministry of Transport
- In office 1999–2003
- Prime Minister: Mahathir Mohamad
- Minister: Ling Liong Sik
- Constituency: Petaling Jaya Selatan

Member of the Malaysian Parliament for Petaling Jaya Selatan
- In office 25 April 1995 – 8 March 2008
- Preceded by: Constituency created from Puchong dan Petaling Jaya
- Succeeded by: Hee Loy Sian (PR–PKR)
- Majority: 11,625 (1995); 3,845 (1999); 21,416 (2004)

Personal details
- Born: Donald Lim Siang Chai; 17 December 1955 (age 70) Sungai Bakap, Penang, Federation of Malaya (now Malaysia)
- Party: Malaysian Chinese Association (MCA)
- Other political affiliations: Barisan Nasional (BN)

Donald Lim Siang Chai (born 17 December 1955) is a Malaysian politician who served as Deputy Minister of Finance II in the Barisan Nasional (BN) administration under former Prime Minister and Minister of Finance I Najib Razak and Minister of Finance II Ahmad Husni Hanadzlah from June 2010 to May 2013 as well as Senator. He had served as Deputy Minister of Tourism in the Barisan Nasional (BN) administration under former Prime Minister Abdullah Ahmad Badawi and former minister Tengku Adnan Tengku Mansor from February 2006 to March 2008, Deputy Minister of Information II from November 2003 to February 2006 as well as Member of Parliament (MP) for Petaling Jaya Selatan from April 1995 to March 2008. He is a member of Malaysian Chinese Association (MCA), a component party of Barisan Nasional (BN) coalitions.

== Political career ==
Lim first elected as MP for Petaling Jaya Selatan in 1995 general election. He reelected as MP for Petaling Jaya Selatan in 1999 and 2004 general election. He fail reelected as MP for Petaling Jaya Selatan in 2008 general election after lost to Hee Loy Sian from PKR.

In 1999 to 2003, he was appointed as Parliamentary Secretary of the Ministry of Transport under minister Ling Liong Sik. In 2003 to 2006, he appointed as Deputy Minister of Information II under minister Mohd Khalil Yaakob and Abdul Kadir Sheikh Fadzir. In 2006 to 2008, he appointed as Deputy Minister of Tourism under minister Tengku Adnan Tengku Mansor after took over from Ahmad Zahid Hamidi. In 2010 to 2013, he was appointed as Deputy Minister of Finance II under minister Najib Razak and minister II Ahmad Husni Hanadzlah after took over from Chor Chee Heung who went on appointed as Minister of Housing and Local Government.

In 2013, he announced his candidacy for MCA deputy president.

== Post career ==
Lim redesignated as Advance Information Marketing Bhd (AIM) executive chairman cum managing director from 31 July 2015.

Lim also served as President of the Subang golf club in Management Committee 2024–2026.

== Election results ==
Parliament of Malaysia
Year	Constituency	Candidate	Votes	Pct	Opponent(s)	Votes	Pct	Ballots cast	Majority	Turnout
1995	P095 Petaling Jaya Selatan	Donald Lim Siang Chai (MCA)	26,646	62.73%	Syed Husin Ali (PRM)	15,021	35.36%	43,854	11,625	65.66%
1995	P095 Petaling Jaya Selatan	Donald Lim Siang Chai (MCA)	26,646	62.73%	Selvanathan Savarimuthu (IND)	811	1.91%	43,854	11,625	65.66%
1999	P095 Petaling Jaya Selatan	Donald Lim Siang Chai (MCA)	24,581	53.70%	Syed Husin Ali (PRM)	20,736	45.30%	46,652	3,845	68.92%
1999	P095 Petaling Jaya Selatan	Donald Lim Siang Chai (MCA)	24,581	53.70%	Selvanathan Savarimuthu (IND)	457	1.00%	46,652	3,845	68.92%
2004	P105 Petaling Jaya Selatan	Donald Lim Siang Chai (MCA)	35,054	70.48%	Sivarasa Rasiah (PKR)	13,638	27.42%	49,738	21,416	67.67%
2008	P105 Petaling Jaya Selatan	Donald Lim Siang Chai (MCA)	22,892	44.46%	Hee Loy Sian (PKR)	28,598	55.54%	52,631	5,706	71.91%
2013	P097 Selayang	Donald Lim Siang Chai (MCA)	34,385	37.84%	William Leong Jee Keen (PKR)	52,343	57.60%	92,528	17,958	87.38%
2013	P097 Selayang	Donald Lim Siang Chai (MCA)	34,385	37.84%	Mohd Hazizi Abdul Rahman (BERJASA)	4,152	4.57%	92,528	17,958	87.38%

== Honours ==
- Selangor
  - Knight Commander of the Order of the Crown of Selangor (DPMS) – Dato' (2002)
