= Petaling (disambiguation) =

Petaling may refer to:

- Petaling, Selangor, a district in Selangor, Malaysia
- Petaling (federal constituency), formerly represented in the Dewan Rakyat (1974–86)
- Petaling Jaya, a city in Selangor, Malaysia
- Petaling Street, a Chinatown located in Kuala Lumpur, Malaysia
- A subdistrict (mukim) of Petaling District within township Majlis Perbandaran Subang Jaya.

== See also ==
- Petaling Jaya (disambiguation)
