= Yong Khoon Seng =

Malaysian politician

Yang Berbahagia Datuk Yong Khoon Seng PGBK DSPN KMN
- 杨昆贤

Deputy Minister of Works
- In office 19 March 2008 – 15 May 2013
- Monarchs: Mizan Zainal Abidin; Abdul Halim
- Prime Minister: Abdullah Ahmad Badawi; Najib Razak
- Minister: Mohd Zin Mohamed; Shaziman Abu Mansor
- Constituency: Stampin

Parliamentary Secretary of the Ministry of Works
- In office 1995–2008
- Monarchs: Ja'afar; Salahuddin; Sirajuddin; Mizan Zainal Abidin
- Prime Minister: Mahathir Mohamad; Abdullah Ahmad Badawi
- Minister: Samy Vellu
- Deputy Minister: Railey Jeffrey (1995–1999); Mohamed Khaled Nordin (1999–2004); Mohd Zin Mohamed (2004–2008)
- Constituency: Padawan; Stampin

Parliamentary Secretary of the Ministry of National Unity and Community Development
- In office 1990–1995
- Monarchs: Azlan Shah; Ja'afar
- Prime Minister: Mahathir Mohamad
- Minister: Napsiah Omar
- Deputy Minister: Alexander Lee Yu Lung
- Constituency: Padawan

Faction represented in Dewan Rakyat
- 1990–2013: Barisan Nasional

Personal details
- Born: Yong Khoon Hian @ Yong Khoon Seng; 22 December 1941 (age 84) Betong, Sarawak
- Party: Sarawak United Peoples' Party (SUPP)
- Other political affiliations: Barisan Nasional (BN)
- Education: University of Queensland
- Occupation: Politician
- Profession: Pharmacist

Yong Khoon Seng (simplified Chinese: 杨昆贤; traditional Chinese: 楊昆賢; pinyin: Yáng Kūnxián; born 22 December 1941) was the Member of the Parliament of Malaysia for the Stampin constituency in Sarawak, representing the Sarawak United Peoples' Party (SUPP), from 1999 until 2013. He was a Deputy Minister of Works in the ruling Barisan Nasional coalition government.

Yong entered Parliament in 1990 for the seat of Padawan. He was immediately appointed as a Parliamentary Secretary. Before entering politics, he was a pharmacist, graduating from the University of Queensland. He was born in Betong, Sarawak.

However, at the 2013 general election, Yong lost his seat to a Democratic Action Party (DAP) candidate, Julian Tan Kok Ping.

== Election results ==
Parliament of Malaysia
Year	Constituency	Candidate	Votes	Pct	Opponent(s)	Votes	Pct	Ballots cast	Majority	Turnout
1990	P158 Padawan	Yong Khoon Seng (SUPP)	16,362	62.66%	Cheng Hui Hong (DAP)	9,751	37.34%	26,692	6,611	67.99%
1995	P170 Padawan	Yong Khoon Seng (SUPP)	19,258	72.33%	Akaw Nonjep (IND)	7,368	27.67%	27,867	11,890	88.09%
1999	P170 Stampin	Yong Khoon Seng (SUPP)	18,810	61.86%	Voon Lee Shan (DAP)	9,913	32.60%	31,098	8,897	60.91%
1999	P170 Stampin	Yong Khoon Seng (SUPP)	18,810	61.86%	Chua Chio Kuia (IND)	1,684	5.54%	31,098	8,897	60.91%
2004	P196 Stampin	Yong Khoon Seng (SUPP)	21,155	61.18%	Voon Lee Shan (DAP)	13,424	38.82%	35,806	7,731	59.87%
2008	P196 Stampin	Yong Khoon Seng (SUPP)	21,966	51.01%	Voon Lee Shan (DAP)	18,896	43.88%	43,922	3,070	65.30%
2008	P196 Stampin	Yong Khoon Seng (SUPP)	21,966	51.01%	See Chee How (PKR)	2,198	5.10%	43,922	3,070	65.30%
2013	P196 Stampin	Yong Khoon Seng (SUPP)	22,993	35.43%	Julian Tan Kok Ping (DAP)	41,663	64.20%	65,515	18,670	77.32%
2013	P196 Stampin	Yong Khoon Seng (SUPP)	22,993	35.43%	Soo Lina (STAR)	239	0.37%	65,515	18,670	77.32%

== Honours ==
- Malaysia
  - Officer of the Order of the Defender of the Realm (KMN) (1991)
- Penang
  - Officer of the Order of the Defender of the State (DSPN) – Dato' (1999)
- Sarawak
  - Commander of the Order of the Star of Hornbill Sarawak (PGBK) – Datuk (2013)
