= Mahadzir Mohd Khir =

Malaysian politicians

Yang Berbahagia Dato' Mahadzir Mohd Khir DSDK

Deputy Minister of Education I
- In office 27 March 2004 – 14 February 2006 Serving with Han Choon Kim (Deputy Minister of Education II)
- Monarch: Sirajuddin
- Prime Minister: Abdullah Ahmad Badawi
- Preceded by: Abdul Aziz Shamsuddin
- Succeeded by: Noh Omar

Parliamentary Secretary of the Ministry of Education
- In office 1999–2004
- Preceded by: Mohamed Rahmat
- Succeeded by: P. Komala Devi

Member of the Malaysian Parliament for Sungai Petani
- In office 29 November 1999 – 8 March 2008
- Preceded by: Che Ibrahim Mustafa (BN–UMNO)
- Succeeded by: Johari Abdul (PR–PKR)
- Majority: 12,133 (1999); 17,502 (2004)

Personal details
- Born: Mahadzir bin Mohd Khir; 16 May 1945 Yan, Kedah, Japanese occupation of Malaya
- Died: 5 September 2012 (aged 67) University of Malaya Medical Centre
- Resting place: Bukit Kiara Muslim Cemetery, Kuala Lumpur
- Party: United Malays National Organisation (UMNO) (–2012)
- Other political affiliations: Barisan Nasional (BN) (–2012)
- Spouse: Amla Mohd Salleh
- Children: 3
- Occupation: Politician, academic

Mahadzir bin Mohd Khir (16 May 1945 – 5 September 2012) is a Malaysian politician and academic who served as Deputy Minister of Education from March 2004 to February 2006 in Barisan National (BN) administration under Prime Minister Abdullah Ahmad Badawi, Parliamentary Secretary of the Ministry of Education from 1999 to 2004 in Barisan National (BN) administration under Prime Minister Mahathir Mohamad and Abdullah Ahmad Badawi and Member of Parliament (MP) for Sungai Petani from November 1999 to March 2008. He is member of United Malays National Organisation (UMNO), a component party of the Barisan Nasional (BN) coalitions.

== Death ==
On 5 September 2012, Mahadzir Mohd Khir died at the University of Malaya Medical Centre at the age of 67 due to a heart attack. There was bleeding in the brain which is a stroke around 6 pm when he was resting with his family. His remains were taken to his home at Jalan 14/50, Section 14, Petaling Jaya. The deceased's remains were prayed at the Tun Abdul Aziz Mosque, Section 14, Petaling Jaya and buried at the Bukit Kiara Islamic Cemetery, Kuala Lumpur. Among the dignitaries present were Prime Minister, Dato' Sri Najib Razak, Deputy Prime Minister, Tan Sri Muhyiddin Yassin and Minister of Rural and Regional Development, Dato' Seri Mohd Shafie Apdal.

== Election results ==
Parliament of Malaysia
Year	Constituency	Candidate	Votes	Pct	Opponent(s)	Votes	Pct	Ballots cast	Majority	Turnout
1999	P015 Sungai Petani	Mahadzir Mohd Khir (UMNO)	31,875	61.75%	Johari Abdul (KeADILan)	19,742	38.25%	55,457	12,133	76.54%
2004	P015 Sungai Petani	Mahadzir Mohd Khir (UMNO)	36,067	66.02%	Zamri Yusuf (PKR)	18,565	33.98%	55,639	17,502	78.45%

== Honours ==
- Kedah
  - Knight Companion of the Order of Loyalty to the Royal House of Kedah (DSDK) – Dato' (1998)
