= Yew Teong Look =

Malaysian politician

Yang Berbahagia Datuk Seri Yew Teong Look SMW PMW
- 姚长禄

Vice President of the Malaysian Chinese Association
- In office 4 November 2018 – 24 September 2023 Serving with Lim Ban Hong & Ti Lian Ker & Tan Teik Cheng
- President: Wee Ka Siong
- Succeeded by: Wee Jeck Seng & Lawrence Low Ah Keong

Parliamentary Secretary of the Ministry of Federal Territories
- In office 2004–2008
- Monarchs: Syed Sirajuddin (2004–2006); Mizan Zainal Abidin (2006–2008)
- Prime Minister: Abdullah Ahmad Badawi
- Minister: Mohd Isa Abdul Samad (2004–2005); Shahrizat Abdul Jalil (Acting) (2005–2006); Zulhasnan Rafique (2006–2008)

Member of the Malaysian Parliament for Wangsa Maju
- In office 21 March 2004 – 8 March 2008
- Preceded by: Zulhasnan Rafique (BN–UMNO)
- Succeeded by: Wee Choo Keong (PR–PKR)
- Majority: 10,185 (2004)

Senator Appointed by the Yang di-Pertuan Agong
- In office 2001–2004
- Monarchs: Salahuddin (2001); Syed Sirajuddin (2001–2004)
- Prime Minister: Mahathir Mohamad (2001–2003); Abdullah Ahmad Badawi (2003–2004)

Personal details
- Born: 26 August 1956 (age 69) Kuala Lumpur
- Party: Malaysian Chinese Association (MCA)
- Other political affiliations: Barisan Nasional (BN)
- Occupation: Politician

Yew Teong Look is a Malaysian politician who had served as Member of Parliament (MP) for Wangsa Maju from March 2004 to March 2008 and Parliamentary Secretary from 2004 to 2008. Prior to that, he had served as a Senator from 2001 to 2004. He is a member of the Malaysian Chinese Association (MCA), a component party of the BN coalition. He had also served as a Vice President of MCA from 2018 to 2023.

== Election results ==
Parliament of Malaysia
| Year | Constituency | Candidate | Votes | Pct | Opponent(s) | Votes | Pct | Ballots cast | Majority | Turnout |
|---|---|---|---|---|---|---|---|---|---|---|
| 2004 | P116 Wangsa Maju | Yew Teong Look (MCA) | 23,135 | 64.11% | Sahri Bahari (PKR) | 12,950 | 35.89% | 37,254 | 10,185 | 73.51% |
| 2008 | P116 Wangsa Maju | Yew Teong Look (MCA) | 19,487 | 49.81% | Wee Choo Keong (PKR) | 19,637 | 50.19% | 39,798 | 150 | 73.01% |
| 2018 | P116 Wangsa Maju | Yew Teong Look (MCA) | 17,940 | 24.37% | Tan Yee Kew (PKR) | 42,178 | 57.30% | 74,509 | 24,238 | 84.21% |
| 2018 | P116 Wangsa Maju | Yew Teong Look (MCA) | 17,940 | 24.37% | Razali Tumirin (PAS) | 13,490 | 18.33% | 74,509 | 24,238 | 84.21% |

== Honours ==
- Federal Territory (Malaysia)
  - Grand Commander of the Order of the Territorial Crown (SMW) – Datuk Seri (2018)
  - Commander of the Order of the Territorial Crown (PMW) – Datuk (2008)
