= Julian Tan =

Malaysian politician

Ts Dr Julian Tan Kok Ping
- 陈国彬

Member of the Malaysian Parliament for Stampin
- In office 5 May 2013 – 9 May 2018
- Preceded by: Yong Khoon Seng; (BN–SUPP)
- Succeeded by: Chong Chieng Jen; (PH–DAP)
- Majority: 18,670 (2013)

Personal details
- Born: 30 October 1978 (age 47) Kuching, Sarawak, Malaysia
- Party: Democratic Action Party (DAP)
- Other political affiliations: Pakatan Harapan (PH); Pakatan Rakyat (PR)
- Children: 1
- Education: University of Putra Malaysia (BEng); Universiti Tunku Abdul Rahman (MEngSc); Monash University Malaysia (PhD)
- Occupation: Lecturer, board member
- Profession: Aerospace Engineer, Researcher, Lecturer

Chinese name
- Traditional Chinese: 陳國彬
- Simplified Chinese: 陈国彬
- Hanyu Pinyin: Chén Guóbīn
- Hokkien POJ: Tân Kokpin

Julian Tan Kok Ping (陈国彬) is a Malaysian professional board member, university lecturer, researcher, and former politician. He was the Member of the Parliament of Malaysia for the Stampin constituency in Sarawak, representing the Democratic Action Party (DAP) after winning the seat for the opposition party for the first time after the 2013 Malaysian general election, wresting the seat from long time MP Datuk Yong Khoon Seng. Choosing to retire from politics, he did not defend his seat in 2018 Malaysian general election, and the seat candidate was changed to the former Bandar Kuching MP Chong Chieng Jen.

Before entering politics, Tan was an aerospace engineer and researcher, graduating with a Masters of Engineering Science (Research) from Universiti Tunku Abdul Rahman. Julian decided not to defend his parliamentary seat in the 14th Malaysian general election and instead retire from politics to focus on his research, science and technology career. He pursued his doctorate at Monash University Malaysia under the Merit Scholarship and was conferred the award Doctor Of Philosophy (PhD) in Engineering on 30 March 2022.

== Election results ==
Parliament of Malaysia
Year	Constituency	Candidate	Votes	Pct	Opponent(s)	Votes	Pct	Ballots cast	Majority	Turnout
2013	P196 Stampin	Julian Tan Kok Ping (DAP)	41,663	64.20%	Yong Khoon Seng (SUPP)	22,993	35.43%	65,515	18,670	77.32%
2013	P196 Stampin	Julian Tan Kok Ping (DAP)	41,663	64.20%	Soo Lina (STAR)	239	0.37%	65,515	18,670	77.32%
