= Chia Kwang Chye =

Malaysian politician

Yang Berbahagia Dato' Seri Chia Kwang Chye DGPN
- 谢宽泰

Deputy Minister of Information II
- In office 14 February 2006 – 18 March 2008 Serving with Ahmad Zahid Hamidi (Deputy Minister of Information I)
- Minister: Zainuddin Maidin
- Preceded by: Donald Lim Siang Chai
- Succeeded by: Tan Lian Hoe
- Constituency: Bukit Bendera

Deputy Minister of Internal Security II
- In office 27 March 2004 – 14 February 2006 Serving with Noh Omar (Deputy Minister of Internal Security I)
- Minister: Abdullah Ahmad Badawi
- Preceded by: new position
- Succeeded by: Fu Ah Kiow
- Constituency: Bukit Bendera

Parliamentary Secretary of the Ministry of Energy, Communications and Multimedia
- In office 1999–2004
- Monarchs: Salahuddin; Sirajuddin
- Prime Minister: Mahathir Mohamad
- Constituency: Bukit Bendera

Member of the Malaysian Parliament for Bukit Bendera
- In office 25 April 1995 – 8 March 2008
- Preceded by: Gooi Hock Seng (DAP)
- Succeeded by: Liew Chin Tong (DAP)
- Majority: 2,918 (1995); 104 (1999); 10,717 (2004)

Personal details
- Born: 9 July 1952 (age 73) Johor, Federation of Malaya (now Malaysia)
- Citizenship: Malaysia
- Party: Parti Gerakan Rakyat Malaysia (Gerakan)
- Other political affiliations: Barisan Nasional (BN) (until 2018); Perikatan Nasional (PN) (since 2021)
- Occupation: Politician

Chia Kwang Chye is a Malaysian politician who served as Deputy Minister of Information II in the Barisan Nasional (BN) administration under former Prime Minister Abdullah Ahmad Badawi and former minister Zainuddin Maidin from February 2006 to March 2008, Deputy Minister of Internal Security II under former Prime Minister and Minister of Internal Security Abdullah Ahmad Badawi from March 2004 to February 2006 as well as Member of Parliament (MP) for Bukit Bendera from April 1995 to March 2008. He is a member of Parti Gerakan Rakyat Malaysia (Gerakan), a component party of Perikatan Nasional (PN), formerly Barisan Nasional (BN) coalitions.

== Political career ==
Chia Kwang Chye first elected as MP for Bukit Bendera in 1995 general election. He reelected as MP for Bukit Bendera in 1999 and 2004 general election. He fail reelected as MP for Bukit Bendera in 2008 general election after lost to Liew Chin Tong from DAP.

In 1999 to 2004, he was appointed as Parliamentary Secretary of the Ministry of Energy, Communications and Multimedia under minister Leo Moggie Irok. In 2004 to 2006, he was appointed as newly created Deputy Minister of Internal Security II under minister Abdullah Ahmad Badawi. In 2006 to 2008, he was appointed as Deputy Minister of Information II under minister Zainuddin Maidin after took over from Donald Lim Siang Chai who went on appointed as Deputy Minister of Tourism.

In 2013, Chia Kwang Chye elected as Tanjong Bunga Gerakan Division Chief.

== Election results ==
Parliament of Malaysia
Year	Constituency	Candidate	Votes	Pct	Opponent(s)	Votes	Pct	Ballots cast	Majority	Turnout
1995	P047 Bukit Bendera	Chia Kwang Chye (Gerakan)	26,683	52.89%	Gooi Hock Seng (DAP)	23,765	47.11%	51,777	2,918	74.78%
1999	P047 Bukit Bendera	Chia Kwang Chye (Gerakan)	24,280	50.11%	Lim Kit Siang (DAP)	24,176	49.89%	49,887	104	71.66%
2004	P048 Bukit Bendera	Chia Kwang Chye (Gerakan)	28,281	61.69%	Zulkifli Mohd Noor (DAP)	17,564	38.31%	46,843	10,717	71.93%
2008	P048 Bukit Bendera	Chia Kwang Chye (Gerakan)	15,131	32.63%	Liew Chin Tong (DAP)	31,243	67.37%	47,105	16,112	72.98%

Penang State Legislative Assembly
Year	Constituency	Candidate	Votes	Pct	Opponent(s)	Votes	Pct	Ballots cast	Majority	Turnout
2013	N22 Tanjong Bunga	Chia Kwang Chye (Gerakan)	5,518	33.28%	Teh Yee Cheu (DAP)	11,033	66.53%	16,777	5,515	83.60%
2013	N22 Tanjong Bunga	Chia Kwang Chye (Gerakan)	5,518	33.28%	Beh Seong Leng (IND)	33	0.20%	16,777	5,515	83.60%

== Honours ==
- Penang
  - Commander of the Order of the Defender of State (DGPN) – Dato' Seri (2006)
