= Hee Loy Sian =

Malaysian politician

- 许来贤

Chairman of the Solid Waste and Public Cleansing Management Corporation
- Incumbent
- Assumed office 31 January 2024
- Minister: Nga Kor Ming
- Chief Executive Officer: Ahmad Husaini Abdul Rahman
- Preceded by: Wong Kah Woh

Member of the Selangor State Executive Council (Environment, Green Technology and Consumer Affairs : 14 May 2018–10 December 2018) (Environment, Green Technology and Consumer Affairs, Science, Technology and Innovation : 10 December 2018–6 October 2020) (Environment, Green Technology, Tourism and Indigenous Affairs : 6 October 2020–21 August 2023)
- In office 14 May 2018 – 21 August 2023
- Monarch: Sharafuddin
- Menteri Besar: Azmin Ali (2018); Amirudin Shari (2018–2023)
- Preceded by: Elizabeth Wong Keat Ping
- Succeeded by: Jamaliah Jamaluddin (Environment and Green Technology); Papparaidu Veraman (Indigenous Affairs); Ng Suee Lim (Tourism)
- Constituency: Kajang

Member of the Selangor State Legislative Assembly for Kajang
- In office 9 May 2018 – 12 August 2023
- Preceded by: Wan Azizah Wan Ismail (PR–PKR)
- Succeeded by: David Cheong Kian Young (PH–PKR)
- Majority: 30,755 (2018)

Member of the Malaysian Parliament for Petaling Jaya Selatan
- In office 8 March 2008 – 9 May 2018
- Preceded by: Donald Lim Siang Chai (BN–MCA)
- Succeeded by: Position abolished
- Majority: 5,706 (2008); 19,216 (2013)

Personal details
- Born: Hee Loy Sian; 18 June 1970 (age 56) Selama, Taiping, Perak, Malaysia
- Party: National Justice Party (keADILan) (1999–2003); People's Justice Party (PKR) (2003–present)
- Other political affiliations: Pakatan Rakyat (PR) (2008–2015); Pakatan Harapan (PH) (since 2015)
- Education: University of Malaya
- Occupation: Politician
- Website: Hee Loy Sian on Blogger

Hee Loy Sian (simplified Chinese: 许来贤; traditional Chinese: 許來賢; pinyin: Xǔ Láixián; born 18 June 1970) is a Malaysian politician who has served as Chairman of the Solid Waste and Public Cleansing Management Corporation (SWCorp) since January 2024. He served as Member of the Selangor State Executive Council (EXCO) in the Pakatan Harapan (PH) state administration under Menteris Besar Azmin Ali and Amirudin Shari and Member of the Selangor State Legislative Assembly (MLA) for Kajang from May 2018 to August 2023 as well as the Member of Parliament (MP) for Petaling Jaya Selatan from March 2008 to May 2018. He is a member of the People's Justice Party (PKR), a component party of the PH and formerly Pakatan Rakyat (PR) coalitions.

== Political career ==
=== Member of Parliament (2008–2018) ===
Hee was elected to Parliament in the 2008 election, winning the seat of Petaling Jaya Selatan from Deputy Tourism Minister Donald Lim Siang Chai of the Barisan Nasional coalition. He was reelected again in the 2013 election.

=== Member of the Selangor State Executive Council (2018–2023) ===
On 14 May 2018, Hee was appointed as Selangor EXCO Member.

=== Member of the Selangor State Legislative Assembly (2018–2023) ===
In the 2018 Selangor state election, Hee contested and won the Kajang state seat in Selangor.

=== Chairman of the Solid Waste and Public Cleansing Management Corporation (since 2024) ===
On 31 January 2024, Hee was appointed as the Chairman of SWCorp by Minister of Housing and Local Government Nga Kor Ming to take over Wong Kah Woh who was appointed as the Deputy Minister of Education in a cabinet reshuffle on 12 December 2023.

== Election results ==
Parliament of Malaysia
Year	Constituency	Candidate	Votes	Pct	Opponent(s)	Votes	Pct	Ballots cast	Majority	Turnout
2008	P105 Petaling Jaya Selatan	Hee Loy Sian (PKR)	28,598	55.54%	Donald Lim Siang Chai (MCA)	22,892	44.46%	52,631	5,706	67.67%
2013	P105 Petaling Jaya Selatan	Hee Loy Sian (PKR)	41,062	63.80%	Sheah Kok Fah (MCA)	21,846	33.95%	65,320	19,216	82.11%
2013	P105 Petaling Jaya Selatan	Hee Loy Sian (PKR)	41,062	63.80%	Ibrahim Khatib (IND)	1,447	2.25%	65,320	19,216	82.11%

Selangor State Legislative Assembly
Year	Constituency	Candidate	Votes	Pct	Opponent(s)	Votes	Pct	Ballots cast	Majority	Turnout
2018	N25 Kajang	Hee Loy Sian (PKR)	39,055	71.59%	Zaiton Ahmad (PAS)	8,300	15.21%	55,083	30,755	88.60%
2018	N25 Kajang	Hee Loy Sian (PKR)	39,055	71.59%	Teh Yeow Meng (MCA)	7,097	13.01%	55,083	30,755	88.60%
2018	N25 Kajang	Hee Loy Sian (PKR)	39,055	71.59%	Wan Jinn Woei (PRM)	103	0.19%	55,083	30,755	88.60%

== See also ==
- Petaling Jaya Selatan (federal constituency)
- Kajang (state constituency)
