= Padawan (federal constituency) =

Sarawak constituency

Defunct federal constituency
- Legislature: Dewan Rakyat
- Constituency created: 1968
- Constituency abolished: 1999
- First contested: 1969
- Last contested: 1995

Padawan was a federal constituency in Sarawak, Malaysia, that was represented in the Dewan Rakyat from 1971 to 1999.

The federal constituency was created in the 1968 redistribution and was mandated to return a single member to the Dewan Rakyat under the first past the post voting system.

== History ==
It was abolished in 1999 when it was redistributed.

=== Representation history ===
Members of Parliament for Padawan
Parliament	No	Years	Member	Party	Vote Share
Constituency created
		1969-1971	Parliament was suspended		
3rd	P125	1971-1973	Stephen Yong Kuet Tze (杨国斯)	SUPP	5,583; 50.45%
3rd	P125	1973-1974	Stephen Yong Kuet Tze (杨国斯)	BN (SUPP)	5,583; 50.45%
4th	P135	1974-1978	Stephen Yong Kuet Tze (杨国斯)	BN (SUPP)	7,072; 58.43%
5th	P135	1978-1982	Stephen Yong Kuet Tze (杨国斯)	BN (SUPP)	Uncontested
6th	P135	1982-1986	Stephen Yong Kuet Tze (杨国斯)	BN (SUPP)	11,640; 64.11%
7th	P158	1986-1990	Stephen Yong Kuet Tze (杨国斯)	BN (SUPP)	14,750; 68.31%
8th	P158	1990-1995	Yong Khoon Hian @ Yong Khoon Seng (杨昆贤)	BN (SUPP)	16,362; 62.66%
9th	P170	1995-1999	Yong Khoon Hian @ Yong Khoon Seng (杨昆贤)	BN (SUPP)	19.259; 72.33%
Constituency abolished, split to Mambong and Stampin

=== State constituency ===
Parliamentary constituency	State constituency					
Parliamentary constituency	1969–1978	1978–1990	1990–1999	1999–2008	2008–2016	2016−present
Padawan	Batu Kawah					
Padawan	Bengoh					

=== Historical boundaries ===
State Constituency	Area		
State Constituency	1968	1977	1987
Batu Kawah	Batu Kawah; Batu Kitang; Kota Sentosa; Stampin; Semenggoh		Malihah; Matang; Moyan Jaya; Batu Kawah; Batu Kitang
Bengoh	Beratok; Bengoh; Mambong; Siburan; Teng Bukap		Beratok; Bengoh; Kampung Bawang; Siburan; Teng Bukap

== Election results ==
Malaysian general election, 1995
Party	Candidate	Votes	%	∆%
BN	Yong Khoon Hian @ Yong Khoon Seng	19,258	72.33	▲9.67
Independent	Akaw Nonjep	7,368	27.67	▲27.67
Total valid votes		26,626	100.00	
Total rejected ballots		849		
Unreturned ballots		392		
Turnout		27,867	88.09	▲20.10
Registered electors		44,363		
Majority		11,890	44.66	▲19.34
BN hold		Swing		

Malaysian general election, 1990
Party	Candidate	Votes	%	∆%
BN	Yong Khoon Hian @ Yong Khoon Seng	16,362	62.66	▼5.65
DAP	Cheng Hui Hong	9,751	37.34	▲37.34
Total valid votes		26,113	100.00	
Total rejected ballots		579		
Unreturned ballots		0		
Turnout		26,692	67.99	▼2.21
Registered electors		39,260		
Majority		6,611	25.32	▼11.30
BN hold		Swing		

Malaysian general election, 1986
Party	Candidate	Votes	%	∆%
BN	Stephen Yong Kuet Tze	14,750	68.31	▲4.20
Independent	Bernabas Kaos	6,842	31.69	▲31.69
Total valid votes		21,592	100.00	
Total rejected ballots		557		
Unreturned ballots		0		
Turnout		22,149	70.20	▼1.36
Registered electors		31,553		
Majority		7,908	36.62	▲8.40
BN hold		Swing		

Malaysian general election, 1982
Party	Candidate	Votes	%	∆%
BN	Stephen Yong Kuet Tze	11,640	64.11	▲64.11
Independent	George Siricord	6,517	35.89	▲35.89
Total valid votes		18,157	100.00	
Total rejected ballots		774		
Unreturned ballots		0		
Turnout		18,931	71.56	
Registered electors		26,453		
Majority		5,123	28.22	
BN hold		Swing		

Malaysian general election, 1978
Party	Candidate	Votes	%	∆%
On the nomination day, Stephen Yong Kuet Tze won uncontested.
BN	Stephen Yong Kuet Tze			
Total valid votes			100.00	
Total rejected ballots				
Unreturned ballots				
Turnout				
Registered electors		21,748		
Majority				
BN hold		Swing		

Malaysian general election, 1974
Party	Candidate	Votes	%	∆%
BN	Stephen Yong Kuet Tze	7,072	58.43	▲58.43
SNAP	Michael Bong Thiam Jun	5,032	41.57	▲13.23
Total valid votes		12,104	100.00	
Total rejected ballots		611		
Unreturned ballots		0		
Turnout		12,715	83.01	▼2.35
Registered electors		15,318		
Majority		2,040	16.86	▼5.25
BN gain from SUPP		Swing		?

Malaysian general election, 1969
Party	Candidate	Votes	%
SUPP	Stephen Yong Kuet Tze	5,583	50.45
SNAP	Cyril Nichols	3,136	28.34
PESAKA	Minah Ranggok	1,203	10.87
Independent	John Turing	1,145	10.35
Total valid votes		11,067	100.00
Total rejected ballots		806	
Unreturned ballots		0	
Turnout		11,873	85.36
Registered electors		13,909	
Majority		2,447	22.11
This was a new constituency created.
