= Stampin =

Township in Sarawak, Malaysia

Stampin is a township and suburb located within Kuching, Sarawak, Malaysia. Administratively, it falls under the jurisdiction of the Kuching South City Council (MBKS).

The township primarily consists of the B.D.C. (Borneo Development Corporation) residential area along with several neighboring housing estates, including Hui Sing Garden, Kampung Stutong, and Stampin Baru. It also lends its name to the broader Stampin federal constituency in the Dewan Rakyat.
