= Rajang (federal constituency) =

Sarawak constituency

Defunct federal constituency
- Legislature: Dewan Rakyat
- Constituency created: 1968
- Constituency abolished: 1990
- First contested: 1969
- Last contested: 1986

Rajang was a federal constituency in Sarawak, Malaysia, that was represented in the Dewan Rakyat from 1971 to 1990.

The federal constituency was created in the 1968 redistribution and was mandated to return a single member to the Dewan Rakyat under the first past the post voting system.

== History ==
It was abolished in 1990 when it was redistributed.

=== Representation history ===
Members of Parliament for Rajang
Parliament	No	Years	Member	Party	Vote Share
Constituency created
		1969-1971	Parliament was suspended		
3rd	P135	1971-1973	Tibuoh Rantai	SUPP	4,217; 40.75%
3rd	P135	1973-1974	Tibuoh Rantai	BN (SUPP)	4,217; 40.75%
3rd	P135	1974	Jawan Empaling	BN (SUPP)	3,951; 54.74%
4th	P145	1974-1978	Jawan Empaling	BN (SUPP)	5,690; 57.05%
5th	P145	1978-1982	Jawan Empaling	BN (SUPP)	6,584; 55.12%
6th	P145	1982-1986	Jawan Empaling	BN (SUPP)	5,733; 58.66%
7th	P168	1986-1990	Nicholas Munong Ipau	Independent	6,113; 48.11%
Constituency abolished, split into Mukah, Selangau, Lanang and Sibu

=== State constituency ===
Parliamentary constituency	State constituency					
Parliamentary constituency	1969–1978	1978–1990	1990–1999	1999–2008	2008–2016	2016−present
Rajang	Dudong					
Rajang	Igan					

=== Historical boundaries ===
State Constituency	Area	
State Constituency	1968	1977
Dudong	Aun; Dudong; Kampung Banyok; Pasai Siong; Sekuau	Dudong; Kampung Banyok; Pasai Siong; Selangau; Tamin
Igan	Bawang Assan; Kut; Muara Sawai; Tanjung Kibong; Tanjung Kunyit	Bawang Assan; Igan; Kut; Tanjung Kibong; Tanjung Kunyit

== Election results ==
Malaysian general election, 1986
Party	Candidate	Votes	%	∆%
Independent	Nicholas Munong Ipau	6,113	48.11	▲48.11
BN	Jawan Empaling	5,960	46.90	▼11.76
Independent	Siew Chee Kiong @ Shaw Chee Kiong	634	4.99	▲4,99
Total valid votes		12,707	100.00	
Total rejected ballots		320		
Unreturned ballots		0		
Turnout		13,027	64.05	▲10.09
Registered electors		20,338		
Majority		153	1.21	▼16.11
Independent gain from BN		Swing		?

Malaysian general election, 1982
Party	Candidate	Votes	%	∆%
BN	Jawan Empaling	5,733	58.66	▲3.54
Independent	Tony Poh	4,041	41.34	▲41.34
Total valid votes		9,774	100.00	
Total rejected ballots		460		
Unreturned ballots		0		
Turnout		10,234	53.96	▼14.19
Registered electors		18,967		
Majority		1,692	17.32	▼0.74
BN hold		Swing		

Malaysian general election, 1978
Party	Candidate	Votes	%	∆%
BN	Jawan Empaling	6,584	55.12	▼1.93
Independent	Yong Ping Kuai	4,427	37.06	▲37.06
Independent	Juga Buan	933	7.81	▲7.81
Total valid votes		11,944	100.00	
Total rejected ballots		302		
Unreturned ballots		0		
Turnout		12,246	68.15	▼3.22
Registered electors		17,968		
Majority		2,157	18.06	▲3.96
BN hold		Swing		

Malaysian general election, 1974
Party	Candidate	Votes	%	∆%
BN	Jawan Empaling	5,690	57.05	▲2.31
SNAP	Daro Paran	4,284	42.95	▼2.31
Total valid votes		9,974	100.00	
Total rejected ballots		494		
Unreturned ballots		0		
Turnout		10,468	71.37	
Registered electors		14,667		
Majority		1,406	14.10	▲4.62
BN hold		Swing		

Malaysian general by-election, 7–12 January 1974 Upon the death of incumbent, Tibuoh Rantai
Party	Candidate	Votes	%	∆%
BN	Jawan Empaling	3,951	54.74	▲54.74
SNAP	Sandah Jarau	3,267	45.26	▲30.38
Total valid votes		7,218	100.00	
Total rejected ballots		212		
Unreturned ballots				
Turnout		7,430	53.90	
Registered electors		13,796		
Majority		684	9.48	▼6.19
BN gain from SUPP		Swing		?

Malaysian general election, 1969
Party	Candidate	Votes	%
SUPP	Tibuoh Rantai	4,217	40.75
PESAKA	Poh Kaya	2,596	25.08
SNAP	Alexander Seli	1,540	14.88
Independent	Anyau Bakit	1,423	13.75
Independent	Salleh Garasi	573	5.54
Total valid votes		10,349	100.00
Total rejected ballots		909	
Unreturned ballots		0	
Turnout		11,258	83.32
Registered electors		13,511	
Majority		1,621	15.67
This was a new constituency created.
