= Telok Kemang =

Telok Kemang Tolok Komang (Negeri Sembilan Malay)
- Suburb of Port Dickson
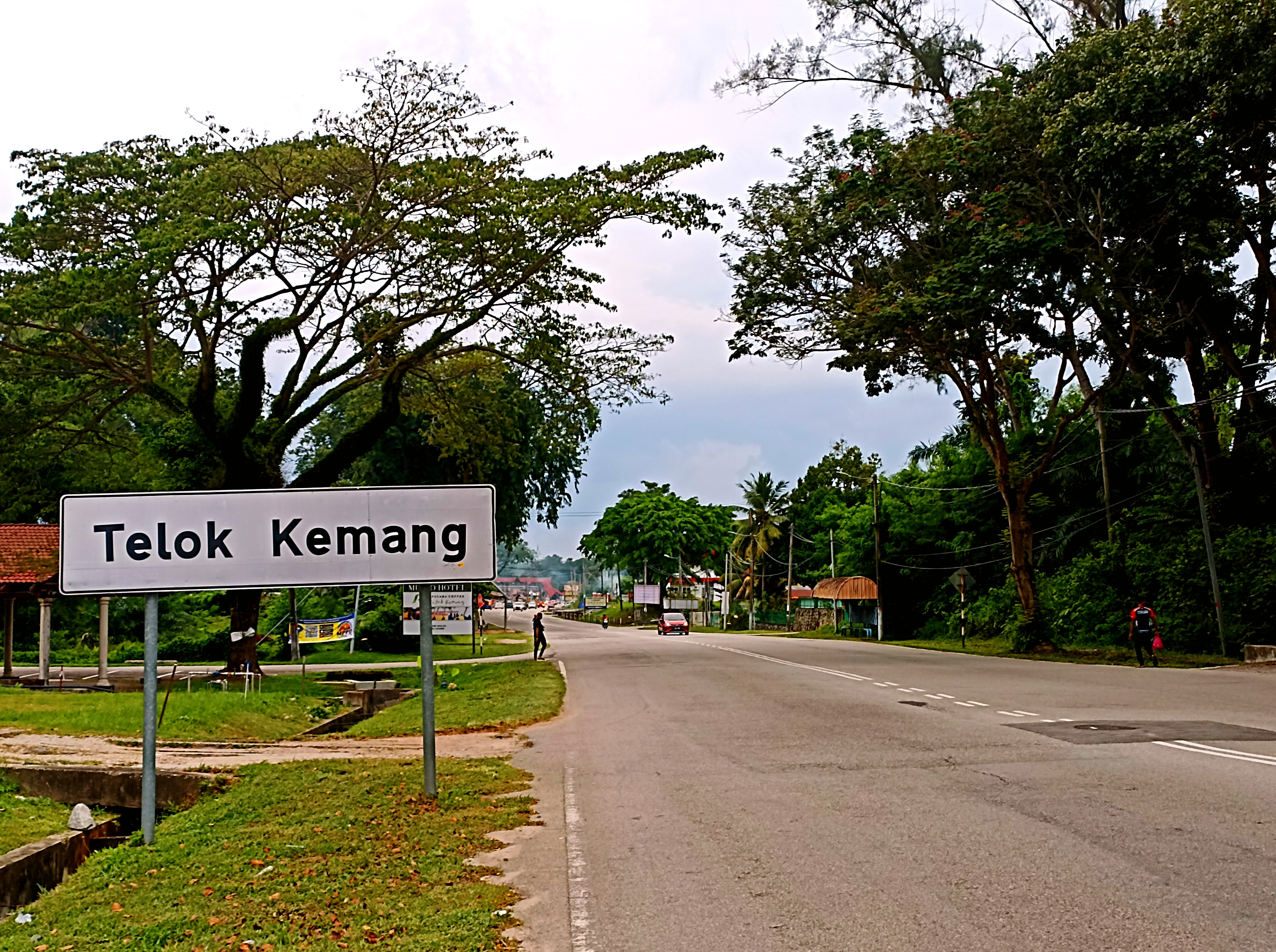
- A section of Federal Route 5 in Telok Kemang

- Location within Negeri Sembilan Location within Peninsular Malaysia Location within Malaysia
- Coordinates: 2°27′42″N 101°51′17″E
- Country: Malaysia
- State: Negeri Sembilan
- District: Port Dickson
- Luak: Sungai Ujong

Government
  - Body: Port Dickson Municipal Council
  - President: Hasnor Abdul Hamid
  - MP: Aminuddin Harun (PH–PKR)
  - MLA: Abdul Fatah Zakaria (PN–PAS)
- Time zone: UTC+8 (MST)
- Postal code: 71050

Telok Kemang in Port Dickson District

Telok Kemang (Negeri Sembilan Malay: Tolok Komang) is a small town south of Port Dickson, Negeri Sembilan, Malaysia. Telok Kemang town is situated at the 11th kilometre on Jalan Pantai.

The eponymous beach of Telok Kemang is the main highlight of the town, known for its fine sands and clear emerald waters. It is the largest and most popular beach within Port Dickson's 11-mile (18 km) stretch of beaches facing the Strait of Malacca. Alongside that, there are so many beach resorts and hotels along the stretch of the beach. Other attractions in Telok Kemang include the Telok Kemang Observatory and the Port Dickson Ornamental Fish Centre. The Telok Kemang Observatory, also known as the Baitul Hilal (Arabic for 'house of the crescent moon'), is one of the most popular places in Malaysia to observe the hilal to mark the beginning of the Islamic months of Ramadan and Shawwal. Aside of being the place with the most hilal observations, the observatory also houses the most sophisticated telescope in Malaysia and the ASEAN region.

Telok Kemang is also accessible via the Seremban-Port Dickson Highway, which links the town to Seremban, the state capital.

== Notable events ==
- 2000 - Telok Kemang Parliament by-elections

== Gallery ==
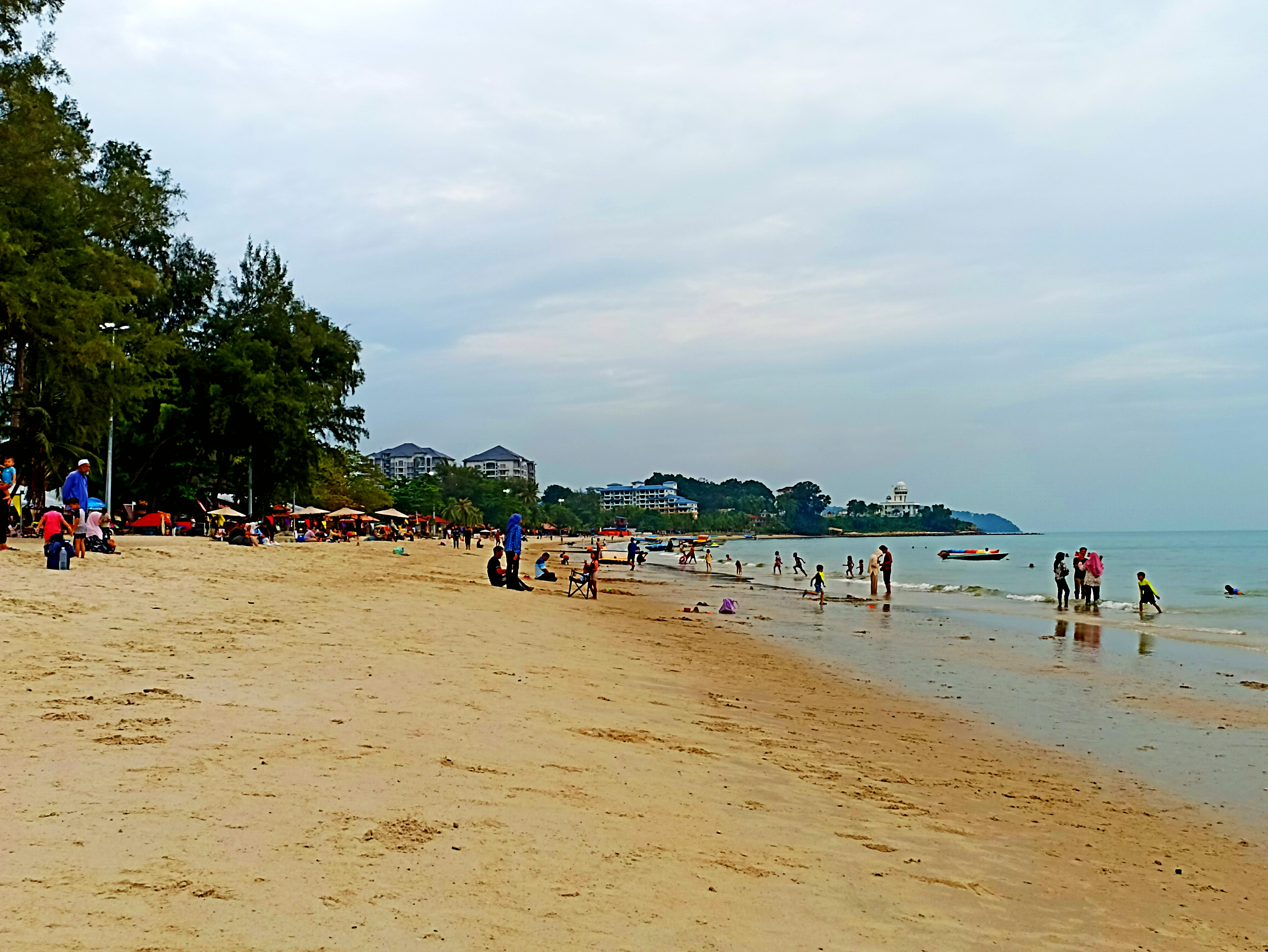
Telok Kemang Beach

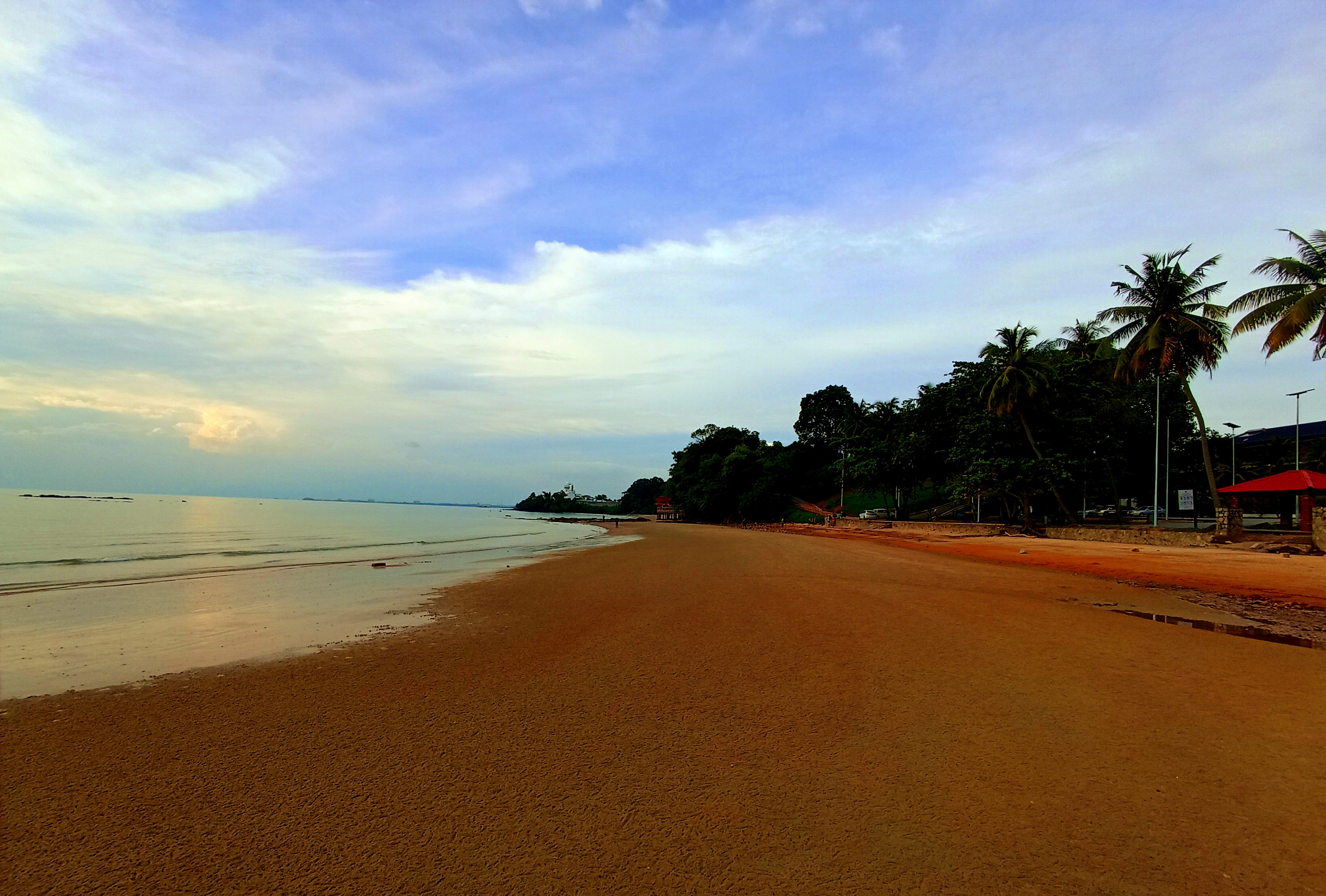
Sri Purnama Beach

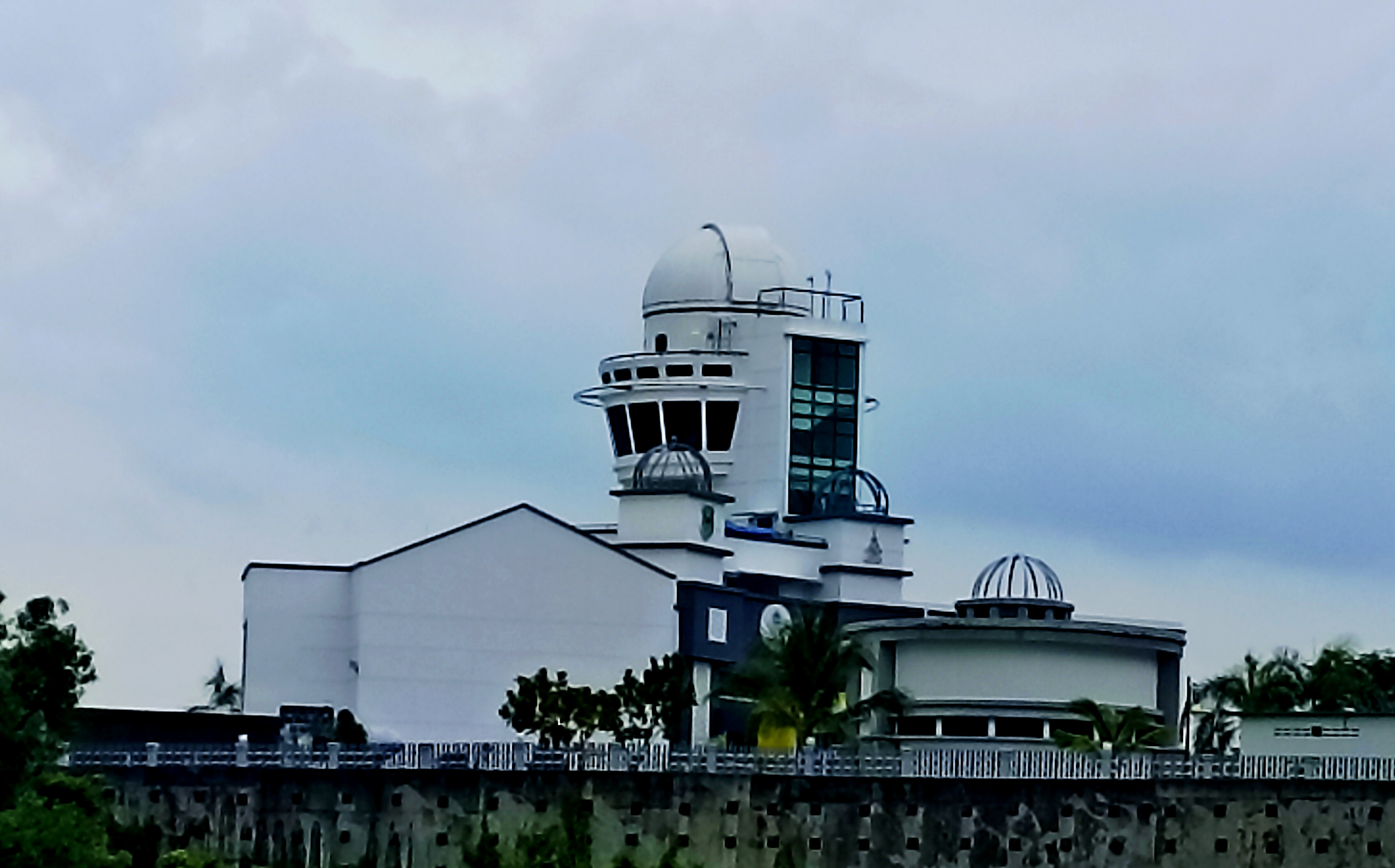
Telok Kemang Observatory

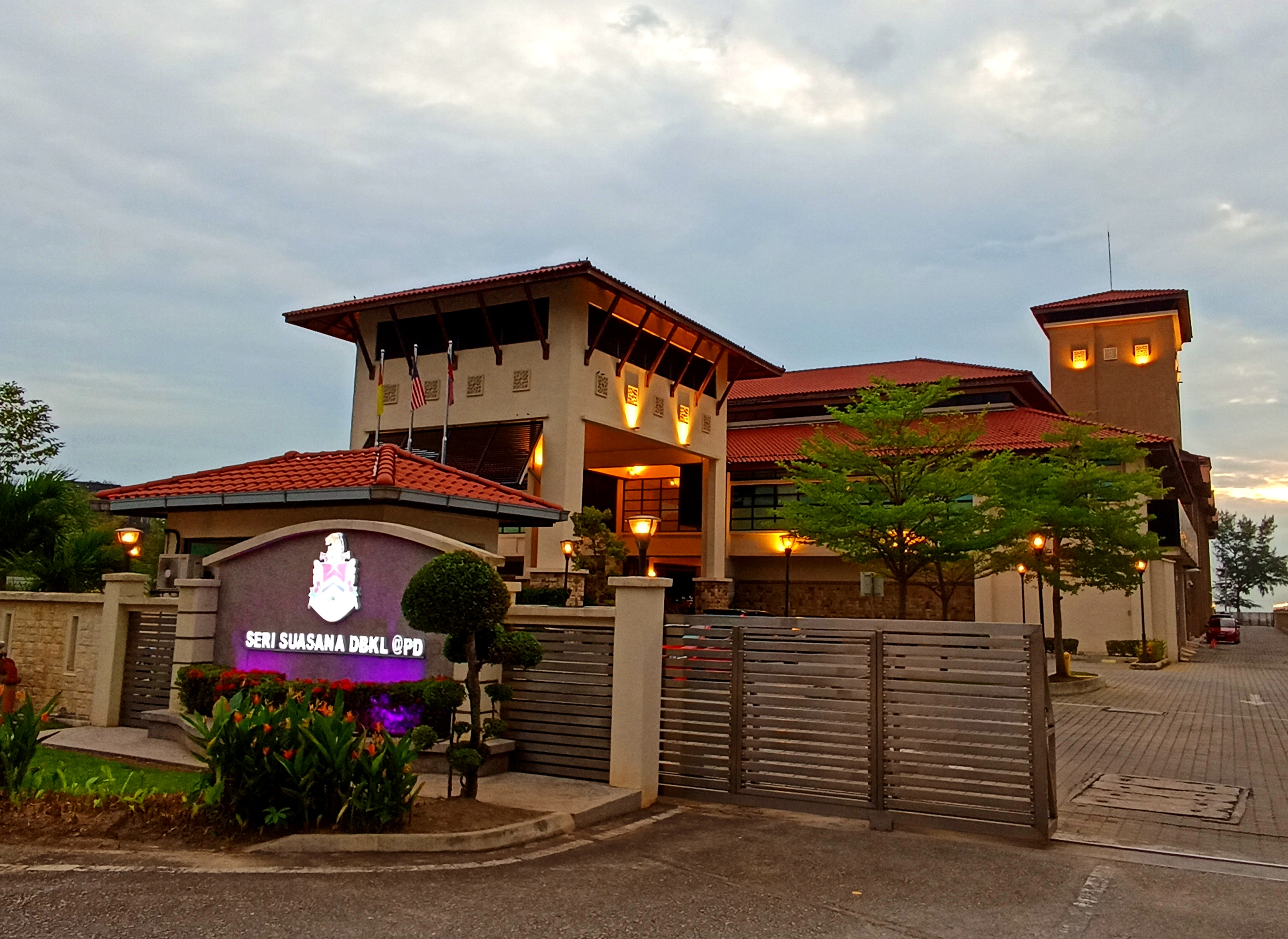
Sri Suasana, a holiday retreat owned by the Kuala Lumpur City Hall
