= Stampin (federal constituency) =

Federal constituency of Sarawak, Malaysia

Stampin (P196)
Sarawak constituency

Federal constituency
- Legislature: Dewan Rakyat
- MP: Chong Chieng Jen; PH
- Constituency created: 1996
- First contested: 1999
- Last contested: 2022

Demographics
- Population (2020): 212,217
- Electors (2022): 121,009
- Area (km²): 194
- Pop. density (per km²): 1,093.9

Stampin is a federal constituency in Kuching Division (Kuching District), Sarawak, Malaysia, that has been represented in the Dewan Rakyat since 1999.

The federal constituency was created in the 1996 redistribution and is mandated to return a single member to the Dewan Rakyat under the first past the post voting system.

== Demographics ==
https://ge15.orientaldaily.com.my/seats/sarawak/p

Ethnic breakdown of Stampin's electorate as of 2022
1. Chinese (61.9%)
2. Sarawak bumiputera (20.9%)
3. Malay-Muslim bumiputera (16.1%)
4. Other ethnicities (1.10%)

As of 2020, Stampin has a population of 212,217 people.

Age breakdown of Stampin's electorate as of 2022
1. 18-20 (6.77%)
2. 21-29 (22.2%)
3. 30-39 (23.1%)
4. 40-49 (19.2%)
5. 50-59 (13.3%)
6. 60-69 (9.27%)
7. 70-79 (4.55%)
8. 80-89 (1.32%)
9. above 90 (0.28%)
Gender breakdown of Stampin's electorate as of 2022
1. Male (50.6%)
2. Female (49.4%)

== History ==
=== Polling districts ===
According to the gazette issued on 31 October 2022, the Stampin constituency has a total of 16 polling districts.

State constituency	Polling Districts	Code	Location
Kota Sentosa (N12)	Stampin	196/12/01	Balai Raya Kpg. Stampin; SJK (C) Chung Hua No. 2
Kota Sentosa (N12)	Seledah	196/12/02	SJK (C) Stampin
Kota Sentosa (N12)	Satria Jaya	196/12/03	SK Satria Jaya; SK Sg. Stutong
Kota Sentosa (N12)	Batu Tujoh	196/12/04	SJK (C) Sam Hap Hin; SK St. Alban; SJK (C) Chung Hua Stampin (Sg. Tapang)
Kota Sentosa (N12)	Hui Sing	196/12/05	SMK Datuk Patinggi Haji Abdul Ghapor Stampin
Kota Sentosa (N12)	Batu Empat	196/12/06	SJK (C) Chung Hu Batu 4 ½
Batu Kitang (N13)	Arang	196/13/01	SMK Arang
Batu Kitang (N13)	Pasar Maong	192/13/02	SK Garland
Batu Kitang (N13)	Haji Baki	196/13/03	SJK (C) Chung Hua Pangkalan Baru; SK Sacred Heart Semeba; Dewan Serbaguna Kpg. Tematu; SK Jln. Haji Baki
Batu Kitang (N13)	Kitang	196/13/04	SJK (C) Chung Hua Batu 8 ½ Batu Kitang; SJK (C) Chung Hua Batu Kitang; SK St. David Bumbok; SJK (C) Chung Hua Batu 10 Jln. Penrissen; SK Kpg. Landeh; RCBM Recreational Centre Batu 13
Batu Kitang (N13)	Lidah Tanah	196/13/05	Balai Raya Lidah Tanah
Batu Kawah (N14)	RPR Batu Kawah	196/14/01	SK RPR Batu Kawah
Batu Kawah (N14)	Kawah	196/14/02	SJK (C) Chung Hua Batu Kawa
Batu Kawah (N14)	Stapok	196/14/03	SK Rantau Panjang; SJK (C) Chung Hua Stapok; SMK Batu Kawa; SJK (C) Chung Hua Sg Tapang; Balai Raya Kpg Desa Wira Lot; SK Jalan Arang; SK Stapok; Dewan Serbaguna Kpg Sinar Budi
Batu Kawah (N14)	Sin San Tu	196/14/04	SJK (C) Chung Hua Sin San Tu
Batu Kawah (N14)	Kim Chu Shin	196/14/05	SJK (C) Chung Hua Kim Choo Seng

=== Representation history ===
Members of Parliament for Stampin
Parliament	No	Years	Member	Party	Vote Share
Constituency created from Padawan, Petra Jaya and Bandar Kuching
10th	P170	1999-2004	Yong Khoon Hian @ Yong Khoon Seng (杨昆贤)	BN (SUPP)	18,810; 61.86%
11th	P196	2004-2008	Yong Khoon Hian @ Yong Khoon Seng (杨昆贤)	BN (SUPP)	21,155; 61.18%
12th	P196	2008-2013	Yong Khoon Hian @ Yong Khoon Seng (杨昆贤)	BN (SUPP)	21,966; 51.01%
13th	P196	2013-2018	Julian Tan Kok Ping (陈国彬)	PR (DAP)	41,663; 64.20%
14th	P196	2018–2022	Chong Chieng Jen (张健仁)	PH (DAP)	33,060; 63.70%
15th	P196	2022–present	Chong Chieng Jen (张健仁)	PH (DAP)	39,310; 53.30%

=== State constituency ===
Parliamentary constituency	State constituency					
Parliamentary constituency	1969–1978	1978–1990	1990–1999	1999–2008	2008–2016	2016−present
Stampin				Batu Kawah		
Stampin						Batu Kitang
Stampin				Batu Lintang		
Stampin					Kota Sentosa	

=== Historical boundaries ===
State Constituency	Area		
State Constituency	1996	2005	2015
Batu Kawah	Batu Kawah; Batu Kitang; Padawan; Stapok; Taman Hui Sing	Batu Kawah; Batu Kitang; Padawan; Sin San Tu; Stapok	Batu Kawah; Kampung Sandong; Kim Chu Sin; Sin San Tu; Stapok
Batu Kitang			Batu Kitang; Kampung Sebetong; Kampung Tematu; Padawan; Taman Seng Goon
Batu Lintang	Batu Lintang; Sama Jaya; Tabuan Dayak; Taman Hua Sin; Taman Swee Joo	Batu Lintang; Jalan Batu Kawah; Sama Jaya; Tabuan Dayak; Taman Swee Joo	
Kota Sentosa		Kota Sentosa; Stampin; Stutong; Sungai Tapang; Taman Arang	Batu Tujuh; Kota Sentosa; Stampin; Stutong; Sungai Tapang

=== Current state assembly members ===
No.	State Constituency	Member	Coalition (Party)
N12	Kota Sentosa	Wilfred Yap Yau Sin	GPS (SUPP)
N13	Batu Kitang	Lo Khere Chiang	GPS (SUPP)
N14	Batu Kawah	Sim Kui Hian	GPS (SUPP)

=== Local governments & postcodes ===
No.	State Constituency	Local Government	Postcode
N12	Kota Sentosa	Kuching South City Council; Kota Samarahan Municipal Council (Batu Tujoh area); Padawan Municipal Council (Batu Empat area)	93200, 93250, 93350 Kuching
N13	Batu Kitang	Kuching South City Council (Pasar Maong area); Kota Samarahan Municipal Council (Kitang area); Padawan Municipal Council; Bau District Council (Lidah Tanah area)	93200, 93250, 93350 Kuching
N14	Batu Kawah	Padawan Municipal Council	93200, 93250, 93350 Kuching

== Election results ==
Malaysian general election, 2022
Party	Candidate	Votes	%	∆%
DAP	Chong Chieng Jen	39,310	53.30	▼10.40
GPS	Lo Khere Chiang	32,152	43.59	▲43.59
PSB	Lue Cheng Hing	2,291	3.11	▲3.11
Total valid votes		73,753	100.00	
Total rejected ballots		546		
Unreturned ballots		248		
Turnout		74,547	60.95	▼18.38
Registered electors		121,009		
Majority		7,158	9.71	▼17.69
DAP hold		Swing		
Source(s) https://lom.agc.gov.my/ilims/upload/portal/akta/outputp/1753265/PARLIMEN%20SARAWAK%20(PUB%20620).pdf

Malaysian general election, 2018
Party	Candidate	Votes	%	∆%
DAP	Chong Chieng Jen	33,060	63.70	▼0.50
BN	Sim Kui Hian	18,839	36.30	▲0.87
Total valid votes		51,899	100.00	
Total rejected ballots		408		
Unreturned ballots		243		
Turnout		52,550	79.33	▲2.01
Registered electors		66,240		
Majority		14,221	27.40	▼1.37
DAP hold		Swing		{{{2}}}
Source(s) "His Majesty's Government Gazette - Notice of Contested Election, Parliament for the State of Sarawak [P.U. (B) 247/2018]" (PDF). Attorney General's Chambers of Malaysia. 3 May 2018. "Federal Government Gazette - Results of Contested Election and Statements of the Poll after the Official Addition of Votes, Parliamentary Constituencies for the State of Sarawak [P.U. (B) 321/2018]" (PDF). Attorney General's Chambers of Malaysia. 28 May 2018.

Malaysian general election, 2013
Party	Candidate	Votes	%	∆%
DAP	Julian Tan Kok Ping	41,663	64.20	▲20.32
BN	Yong Khoon Hian @ Yong Khoon Seng	22,993	35.43	▼15.58
STAR	Soo Lina	239	0.37	▲0.37
Total valid votes		64,895	100.00	
Total rejected ballots		488		
Unreturned ballots		132		
Turnout		65,515	77.32	▲12.02
Registered electors		84,732		
Majority		18,670	28.77	▲21.64
DAP gain from BN		Swing		?
Source(s) "Federal Government Gazette - Notice of Contested Election, Parliament for the State of Sarawak [P.U. (B) 184/2013]" (PDF). Attorney General's Chambers of Malaysia. 26 April 2013. "Federal Government Gazette - Results of Contested Election and Statements of the Poll after the Official Addition of Votes, Parliamentary Constituencies for the State of Sarawak [P.U. (B) 225/2013]" (PDF). Attorney General's Chambers of Malaysia. 22 May 2013.

Malaysian general election, 2008
Party	Candidate	Votes	%	∆%
BN	Yong Khoon Hian @ Yong Khoon Seng	21,966	51.01	▼10.17
DAP	Voon Lee Shan	18,896	43.88	▲5.06
PKR	See Chee How	2,198	5.10	▲5.10
Total valid votes		43,060	100.00	
Total rejected ballots		428		
Unreturned ballots		434		
Turnout		43,922	65.30	▲5.43
Registered electors		67,257		
Majority		3,070	7.13	▼15.23
BN hold		Swing		

Malaysian general election, 2004
Party	Candidate	Votes	%	∆%
BN	Yong Khoon Hian @ Yong Khoon Seng	21,155	61.18	▼0.68
DAP	Voon Lee Shan	13,424	38.82	▲6.22
Total valid votes		34,579	100.00	
Total rejected ballots		529		
Unreturned ballots		698		
Turnout		35,806	59.87	▼1.10
Registered electors				
Majority		7,731	22.36	▼6.90
BN hold		Swing		

Malaysian general election, 1999
Party	Candidate	Votes	%
BN	Yong Khoon Hian @ Yong Khoon Seng	18,810	61.86
DAP	Voon Lee Shan	9,913	32.60
Independent	Chua Chio Kuia	1,684	5.54
Total valid votes		30,407	100.00
Total rejected ballots		391	
Unreturned ballots		300	
Turnout		31,098	60.91
Registered electors			
Majority		8,897	29.26
This was a new constituency created.
