= Petaling Jaya Selatan =

Selangor constituency

Defunct federal constituency
- Legislature: Dewan Rakyat
- Constituency created: 1994
- Constituency abolished: 2018
- First contested: 1995
- Last contested: 2013

Petaling Jaya Selatan was a federal constituency in Selangor, Malaysia, that was represented in the Dewan Rakyat from 1995 to 2018.

The federal constituency was created in the 1994 redistribution and was mandated to return a single member to the Dewan Rakyat under the first past the post voting system.

== History ==
It was abolished in 2018 when it was redistributed.

=== Representation history ===
Members of Parliament for Petaling Jaya Selatan
| Parliament | No | Years | Member | Party | Vote Share |
Constituency created from Puchong and Petaling Jaya
| 9th | P095 | 1995–1999 | Donald Lim Siang Chai (林祥才) | BN (MCA) | 26,646; 62.73% |
| 10th | P095 | 1999–2004 | Donald Lim Siang Chai (林祥才) | BN (MCA) | 24,581; 53.70% |
| 11th | P105 | 2004-2008 | Donald Lim Siang Chai (林祥才) | BN (MCA) | 35,054; 71.99% |
| 12th | P105 | 2008–2013 | Hee Loy Sian (许来贤) | PR (PKR) | 28,598; 55.54% |
| 13th | P105 | 2013–2015 | Hee Loy Sian (许来贤) | PR (PKR) | 41,062; 63.80% |
| 13th | P105 | 2015–2018 | Hee Loy Sian (许来贤) | PH (PKR) | 41,062; 63.80% |
Constituency abolished, renamed to Petaling Jaya

=== State constituency ===
| Parliamentary constituency | State constituency | | | | | | |
| Parliamentary constituency | 1955–59* | 1959–1974 | 1974–1986 | 1986–1995 | 1995–2004 | 2004–2018 | 2018–present |
|---|---|---|---|---|---|---|---|
| Petaling Jaya Selatan | | | | | Bukit Gasing | | |
| Petaling Jaya Selatan | | | | | Taman Medan | | |

=== Historical boundaries ===
| State Constituency | Area | |
| State Constituency | 1994 | 2003 |
|---|---|---|
| Bukit Gasing | Jalan Othman; Jalan Templer; Jalan Universiti; Petaling Jaya; Seksyen 1, 5-17 & 18 Petaling Jaya | Jalan Othman; Jalan Templer; Jalan Universiti; Petaling Jaya; Seksyen 1, 5-18 Petaling Jaya |
| Taman Medan | Kampung Dato Harun; PJ Old Town; Seksyen 2-4, 51 & 52 Petaling Jaya; PJS1 - 5; Taman Sri Manja | Kampung Dato Harun; PJ Old Town; Seksyen 2-4, 51 & 52 Petaling Jaya; PJS1 - 4; Taman Sri Manja |

== Election results ==
Malaysian general election, 2013: Petaling Jaya Selatan
| Party | Candidate | Votes | % | ∆% |
|---|---|---|---|---|
| PKR | Hee Loy Sian | 41,062 | 63.80 | ▲8.26 |
| BN | Sheah Kok Fah | 21,846 | 33.95 | ▼10.51 |
| Independent | Ibrahim Khatib | 1,447 | 2.25 | ▲2.25 |
| Total valid votes | | 64,355 | 100.00 | |
| Total rejected ballots | | 830 | | |
| Unreturned ballots | | 138 | | |
| Turnout | | 65,323 | 82.11 | ▲10.20 |
| Registered electors | | 79,558 | | |
| Majority | | 19,216 | 29.85 | ▲18.77 |
| PKR hold | | Swing | | |
Source(s) "Federal Government Gazette - Notice of Contested Election, Parliament for the State of Selangor [P.U. (B) 176/2013]" (PDF). Attorney General's Chambers of Malaysia. 26 April 2013. Archived from the original (PDF) on 2018-09-30. "Federal Government Gazette - Results of Contested Election and Statements of the Poll after the Official Addition of Votes, Parliamentary Constituencies for the State of Selangor [P.U. (B) 217/2013]" (PDF). Attorney General's Chambers of Malaysia. 22 May 2013. Archived from the original (PDF) on September 30, 2018.

Malaysian general election, 2008: Petaling Jaya Selatan
| Party | Candidate | Votes | % | ∆% |
|---|---|---|---|---|
| PKR | Hee Loy Sian | 28,598 | 55.54 | ▲27.53 |
| BN | Donald Lim Siang Chai | 22,892 | 44.46 | ▼27.53 |
| Total valid votes | | 51,490 | 100.00 | |
| Total rejected ballots | | 1,044 | | |
| Unreturned ballots | | 97 | | |
| Turnout | | 52,631 | 71.91 | ▲4.24 |
| Registered electors | | 73,192 | | |
| Majority | | 5,706 | 11.08 | ▼32.90 |
| PKR gain from BN | | Swing | | ? |

Malaysian general election, 2004: Petaling Jaya Selatan
| Party | Candidate | Votes | % | ∆% |
|---|---|---|---|---|
| BN | Donald Lim Siang Chai | 35,054 | 71.99 | ▲18.29 |
| PKR | Sivarasa Rasiah | 13,638 | 28.01 | ▲28.01 |
| Total valid votes | | 48,692 | 100.00 | |
| Total rejected ballots | | 1,008 | | |
| Unreturned ballots | | 38 | | |
| Turnout | | 49,738 | 67.67 | ▼1.25 |
| Registered electors | | 73,503 | | |
| Majority | | 21,416 | 43.98 | ▲35.58 |
| BN hold | | Swing | | |

Malaysian general election, 1999: Petaling Jaya Selatan
| Party | Candidate | Votes | % | ∆% |
|---|---|---|---|---|
| BN | Donald Lim Siang Chai | 24,581 | 53.70 | ▼9.03 |
| Parti Rakyat Malaysia | Syed Husin Ali | 20,736 | 45.30 | ▲9.94 |
| Independent | Selvanathan Savarimuthu | 457 | 1.00 | ▼0.91 |
| Total valid votes | | 45,774 | 100.00 | |
| Total rejected ballots | | 772 | | |
| Unreturned ballots | | 106 | | |
| Turnout | | 46,652 | 68.92 | ▲3.26 |
| Registered electors | | 67,687 | | |
| Majority | | 3,845 | 8.40 | ▼18.97 |
| BN hold | | Swing | | |

Malaysian general election, 1995: Petaling Jaya Selatan
| Party | Candidate | Votes | % |
|---|---|---|---|
| BN | Donald Lim Siang Chai | 26,646 | 62.73 |
| Parti Rakyat Malaysia | Syed Husin Ali | 15,021 | 35.36 |
| Independent | Selvanathan Savarimuthu | 811 | 1.91 |
| Total valid votes | | 42,478 | 100.00 |
| Total rejected ballots | | 1,022 | |
| Unreturned ballots | | 354 | |
| Turnout | | 43,854 | 65.66 |
| Registered electors | | 66,786 | |
| Majority | | 11,625 | 27.37 |
This was a new constituency created.
