= Results of the 2013 Malaysian general election by parliamentary constituency =

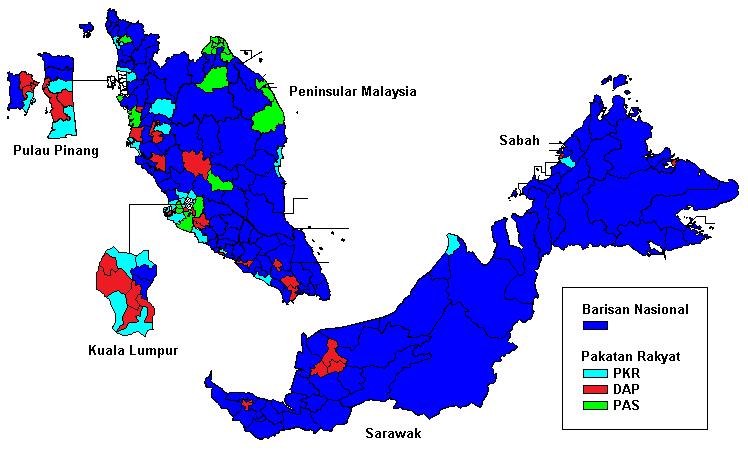
Members of Dewan Rakyat as elected in 2013 by federal constituency

Equal-area representation of members of Dewan Rakyat as elected in 2013 by federal constituency

Diagram of the members of Dewan Rakyat as elected in 2013

These are the election results of the 2013 Malaysian general election by parliamentary constituency. These members of parliament (MPs) will be representing their constituency from the first sitting of 13th Malaysian Parliament to its dissolution.

The parliamentary election deposit was set at RM 10,000 per candidate. Similar to previous elections, the election deposit will be forfeited if the particular candidate had failed to secure at least 12.5% or one-eighth of the votes.

== Summary of results ==
Summary of the 2013 Malaysian Dewan Rakyat election results ** Fraction of total popular votes in each state rounded to the nearest percent * Fraction of total seats in each state rounded to the nearest percent ± Change in number of seats from before the election
State / federal territory	Barisan Nasional					Pakatan Rakyat					Independent and others					Total	
State / federal territory	Votes	**	Seats	*	±	Votes	**	Seats	*	±	Votes	**	Seats	*	±	Votes	Seats
Perlis	64,192	55.36%	3	100%	0	51,358	44.29%	0	0%	0	406	0.35%	0	0%	0	115,956	3
Kedah	451,095	50.60%	10	66%	1	431,999	48.45%	5	33%	1	8,481	0.95%	0	0%	2	891,575	15
Kelantan	330,382	42.95%	5	36%	3	413,087	53.70%	9	64%	2	25,745	3.35%	0	0%	1	769,214	14
Terengganu	283,455	51.43%	4	50%	2	267,112	48.47%	4	50%	2	566	0.10%	0	0%	0	551,133	8
Penang	229,395	31.54%	3	23%	1	493,327	67.84%	10	77%	1	4,522	0.62%	0	0%	2	727,244	13
Perak	512,861	44.95%	12	50%	1	623,860	54.68%	12	50%	2	4,155	0.36%	0	0%	1	1,140,876	24
Pahang	337,596	55.18%	10	72%	2	271,411	44.37%	4	28%	2	2,759	0.45%	0	0%	0	611,766	14
Selangor	685,557	38.96%	5	23%	1	1,044,717	59.38%	17	77%	1	29,196	1.66%	0	0%	0	1,759,470	22
WP Kuala Lumpur	227,268	34.55%	2	23%	1	425,352	64.66%	9	77%	0	5,230	0.80%	0	0%	1	657,850	11
WP Putrajaya	9,943	69.31%	1	100%	0	4,402	30.69%	0	0%	0	0	0%	0	0%	0	14,345	1
Negeri Sembilan	236,703	50.95%	5	63%	0	220,026	47.36%	3	37%	0	7,889	1.70%	0	0%	0	464,618	8
Malacca	202,885	53.81%	4	67%	1	174,171	46.19%	2	33%	1	0	0%	0	0%	0	377,056	6
Johor	750,786	54.92%	21	81%	4	615,123	45.00%	5	19%	4	1,033	0.08%	0	0%	0	1,366,942	26
WP Labuan	12,694	66.29%	1	100%	0	6,455	33.71%	0	0%	0	0	0%	0	0%	0	19,149	1
Sabah	421,828	54.75%	22	88%	2	277,411	36.01%	3	12%	0	71,227	9.24%	0	0%	2	770,466	25
Sarawak	481,038	58.86%	25	81%	4	304,498	37.26%	6	19%	4	31,681	3.88%	0	0%	0	817,217	31
Total	5,237,699	47.38%	133	60%	2	5,623,984	50.87%	89	40%	11	192,894	1.75%	0	0%	9	11,054,577	222

GOVERNMENT SEATS
Marginal
Mas Gading	Nogeh Gumbek	SPDP	40.6
Keningau	Joseph Pairin Kitingan	PBS	43.8
Pensiangan	Joseph Kurup	PBRS	44.3
Kota Marudu	Maximus Johnity Ongkili	PBS	45.9
Cameron; Highlands	Palanivel K. Govindasamy	MIC	46.2
Tenom	Raime Unggi	UMNO	46.7
Baram	Anyi Ngau	SPDP	48.9
Ranau	Ewon Ebin	UPKO	49.2
Bentong	Liow Tiong Lai	MCA	49.4
Beaufort	Azizah Mohd Dun	UMNO	49.4
Labis	Chua Tee Yong	MCA	49.5
Sungai Besar	Noriah Kasnon	UMNO	49.6
Kuala Selangor	Irmohizam Ibrahim	UMNO	49.6
Pasir Gudang	Normala Abdul Samad	UMNO	49.6
Bagan Serai	Noor Azmi Ghazali	UMNO	49.7
Hulu Selangor	Kamalanathan Panchanathan	MIC	49.9
Ketereh	Annuar Musa	UMNO	50.1
Machang	Ahmad Jazlan Yaakub	UMNO	50.1
Tebrau	Khoo Soo Seang	MCA	50.1
Kota Belud	Abdul Rahman Dahlan	UMNO	50.1
Jerai	Jamil Khir Baharom	UMNO	50.2
Segamat	Subramaniam Sathasivam	MIC	50.3
Kuala Kangsar	Wan Mohammad Khair-il Anuar	UMNO	50.4
Arau	Shahidan Kassim	UMNO	50.6
Bera	Ismail Sabri Yaakob	UMNO	50.6
Titiwangsa	Johari Abdul Ghani	UMNO	50.6
Ledang	Hamim Samuri	UMNO	50.7
Tasek Gelugor	Shabudin Yahaya	UMNO	50.8
Setiawangsa	Ahmad Fauzi Zahari	UMNO	50.8
Tuaran	Madius Tangau	UPKO	50.8
Kulim- Bandar Baharu	Abd. Aziz Sheikh Fadzir	UMNO	51.0
Muar	Razali Ibrahim	UMNO	51.0
Pulai	Nur Jazlan Mohamed	UMNO	51.0
Balik Pulau	Hilmi Yahaya	UMNO	51.1
Pendang	Othman Abdul	UMNO	51.5
Merbok	Ismail Daut	UMNO	51.9
Bagan Datok	Ahmad Zahid Hamidi	UMNO	52.1
Sabak Bernam	Mohd Fasiah Mohd Fakeh	UMNO	52.1
Baling	Abdul Azeez Abdul Rahim	UMNO	52.5
Sik	Mansor Abd Rahman	UMNO	52.6
Sepanggar	Jumat Idris	UMNO	52.6
Saratok	William Ikom	SPDP	52.6
Jerlun	Othman Aziz	UMNO	52.8
Tanjong Malim	Ong Ka Chuan	MCA	53.0
Tanah Merah	Ikmal Hisham Abdul Aziz	UMNO	53.1
Sekijang	Anuar Abd. Manap	UMNO	53.2
Jerantut	Ahmad Nazlan Idris	UMNO	53.7
Kepala Batas	Reezal Merican Naina Merican	UMNO	53.8
Padang Rengas	Mohamed Nazri Abdul Aziz	UMNO	53.8
Tawau	Yap Kain Ching	PBS	53.8
Kangar	Shaharuddin Ismail	UMNO	53.9
Sri Aman	Masir Kujat	PRS	54.4
Tanjong Karang	Noh Omar	UMNO	54.5
Padang Terap	Mahdzir Khalid	UMNO	54.6
Lubok Antu	William Nyallau Badak	PRS	54.7
Tanjong Piai	Wee Jeck Seng	MCA	55.0
Lipis	Abdul Rahman Mohamad	UMNO	55.1
Tambun	Ahmad Husni Hanadzlah	UMNO	55.3
Larut	Hamzah Zainudin	UMNO	55.6
Johor Bahru	Shahrir Abdul Samad	UMNO	55.8
Fairly safe
Batu Sapi	Linda Tsen Thau Lin	PBS	56.0
Besut	Idris Jusoh	UMNO	56.1
Setiu	Che Mohamad Zulkifly Jusoh	UMNO	56.1
Tapah	Saravanan Murugan	MIC	56.1
Sri Gading	Aziz Kaprawi	UMNO	56.4
Jeli	Mustapa Mohamed	UMNO	56.5
Hulu Terengganu	Jailani Johari	UMNO	56.5
Kemaman	Ahmad Shabery Cheek	UMNO	56.9
Parit	Mohd Zaim Abu Hassan	UMNO	56.9
Jempol	Mohd Isa Abdul Samad	UMNO	56.9
Simpang; Renggam	Liang Teck Meng	GERAKAN	57.0
Pasir Salak	Tajuddin Abdul Rahman	UMNO	57.4
Kuala Krau	Ismail Mohamed Said	UMNO	57.5
Bintulu	Tiong King Sing	SPDP	57.6
Lenggong	Shamsul Anuar Nasarah	UMNO	58.1
Selangau	Joseph Entulu Belaun	PRS	58.1
Silam	Nasrun Mansur	UMNO	58.2
Julau	Joseph Salang Gandum	PRS	58.3
Kubang Pasu	Mohd Johari Baharum	UMNO	58.4
Paya Besar	Abdul Manan Ismail	UMNO	58.4
Jelebu	Zainuddin Ismail	UMNO	58.4
Ayer Hitam	Wee Ka Siong	MCA	58.4
Kanowit	Aaron Ago Dagang	PRS	58.5
Putatan	Marcus Mojigoh	UPKO	58.7
Maran	Ismail Muttalib	UMNO	59.1
Alor Gajah	Koh Nai Kwong	MCA	59.2
Jasin	Ahmad Hamzah	UMNO	59.5
Kimanis	Anifah Aman	UMNO	59.5
Padang Besar	Zahidi Zainul Abidin	UMNO	59.6
Safe
Kudat	Abdul Rahim Bakri	UMNO	60.2
Tampin	Shaziman Abu Mansor	UMNO	60.4
Gerik	Hasbullah Osman	UMNO	60.6
Parit Sulong	Noraini Ahmad	UMNO	60.9
Gua Musang	Tengku Razaleigh Hamzah	UMNO	61.0
Kuala Pilah	Hasan Malek	UMNO	61.0
Libaran	Juslie Ajirol	UMNO	61.2
Tangga Batu	Abu Bakar Mohamad Diah	UMNO	61.4
Hulu Rajang	Ugak Kumbong	PRS	61.8
Rembau	Khairy Jamaluddin	UMNO	62.1
Mambong	James Dawos Mamit	PBB	62.8
Sembrong	Hishammuddin Hussein	UMNO	63.7
Sibuti	Ahmad Lai Bujang	UMNO	63.8
Papar	Rosnah Abdul Rashid Shirlin	UMNO	63.9
Kalabakan	Abdul Ghapur Salleh	UMNO	64.0
Pagoh	Muhyiddin Yassin	UMNO	64.8
Pontian	Ahmad Maslan	UMNO	65.0
Rompin	Jamaluddin Jarjis	UMNO	65.5
Labuan	Rozman Isli	UMNO	65.6
Kinabatangan	Bung Moktar Radin	UMNO	67.0
Langkawi	Nawawi Ahmad	UMNO	67.2
Sipitang	Sapawi Ahmad	UMNO	67.3
Putrajaya	Tengku Adnan Tengku Mansor	UMNO	69.0
Masjid Tanah	Mas Ermieyati Samsudin	UMNO	69.7
Beluran	Ronald Kiandee	UMNO	69.7
Mersing	Abdul Latiff Ahmad	UMNO	70.2
Lawas	Henry Sum Agong	PBB	70.6
Limbang	Hasbi Habibollah	PBB	72.8
Serian	Richard Riot Jaem	SUPP	73.5
Tenggara	Halimah Mohamed Sadique	UMNO	73.7
Pekan	Najib Razak	UMNO	75.2
Batang Lupar	Rohani Abdul Karim	PBB	75.4
Mukah	Leo Michael Toyad	PBB	75.5
Betong	Douglas Uggah Embas	PBB	75.9
Kota Samarahan	Rubiah Wang	PBB	76.8
Kapit	Alexander Nanta Linggi	PBB	77.1
Petra Jaya	Fadillah Yusof	PBB	77.8
Semporna	Mohd Shafie Apdal	UMNO	81.1
Pengerang	Azalina Othman Said	UMNO	81.9
Kota Tinggi	Noor Ehsanuddin; Mohd Harun Narrashid	UMNO	82.4
Santubong	Wan Junaidi Tuanku Jaafar	PBB	84.4
Batang Sadong	Nancy Shukri	PBB	85.5
Igan	Wahab Dolah	PBB	85.8
Tanjong Manis	Norah Abdul Rahman	PBB	87.4

NON-GOVERNMENT SEATS
Marginal
Alor Setar	Gooi Hsiao-Leung	PKR	47.4
Sepang	Mohamed Hanipa Maidin	PAS	49.1
Bachok	Ahmad Marzuk Shaary	PAS	49.5
Kuala Nerus	Mohd Khairuddin Aman Razali	PAS	49.9
Telok Kemang	Kamarul Bahrin Abbas	PKR	49.9
Temerloh	Nasrudin Hassan	PAS	50.1
Batu Pahat	Mohd Idris Jusi	PKR	50.1
Bukit Gantang	Idris Ahmad	PAS	50.2
Sarikei	Wong Ling Biu	DAP	50.4
Pasir Puteh	Nik Mazian Nik Mohamad	PAS	50.8
Lembah Pantai	Nurul Izzah Anwar	PKR	51.0
Sandakan	Wong Tien Fatt	DAP	51.0
Miri	Michael Teo Yu Keng	PKR	51.0
Kuala Krai	Mohd Hatta Ramli	PAS	51.2
Gombak	Mohamed Azmin Ali	PKR	51.4
Dungun	Wan Hassan Mohd Ramli	PAS	51.9
Sungai Siput	Michael Jeyakumar Devaraj	PKR	51.9
Raub	Ariff Sabri Abdul Aziz	DAP	52.1
Sibu	Oscar Ling Chai Yew	DAP	52.1
Pokok Sena	Mahfuz Omar	PAS	52.2
Kuala Langat	Abdullah Sani Abdul Hamid	PKR	52.2
Seremban	Loke Siew Fook	DAP	52.2
Kuala Kedah	Azman Ismail	PKR	52.3
Marang	Abdul Hadi Awang	PAS	52.6
Bukit Katil	Shamsul Iskandar Md. Akin	PKR	52.6
Padang Serai	Surendran Nagarajan	PKR	53.0
Bakri	Er Teck Hwa	DAP	53.4
Kluang	Liew Chin Tong	DAP	54.0
Kuantan	Fuziah Salleh	PKR	54.1
Wangsa Maju	Tan Kee Kwong	PKR	54.4
Sungai Petani	Johari Abdul	PKR	54.7
Kampar	Ko Chung Sen	DAP	54.7
Lumut	Mohamad Imran Abd Hamid	PKR	54.8
Kapar	G. Manivannan Gowindasamy	PKR	55.1
Beruas	Ngeh Koo Ham	DAP	55.5
Shah Alam	Khalid Samad	PAS	55.7
Tumpat	Kamarudin Jaffar	PAS	55.8
Pasir Mas	Nik Mohamad Abduh Nik Abdul Aziz	PAS	55.8
Fairly safe
Kuala Terengganu	Raja Kamarul Bahrin Shah	PAS	56.0
Indera Mahkota	Fauzi Abdul Rahman	PKR	56.1
Telok Intan	Seah Leong Peng	DAP	56.3
Bandar Tun Razak	Abdul Khalid Ibrahim	PKR	56.4
Selayang	William Leong Jee Keen	PKR	56.7
Rantau Panjang	Siti Zailah Mohd Yusoff	PAS	56.9
Nibong Tebal	Mansor Othman	PKR	57.1
Hulu Langat	Che Rosli Che Mat	PAS	57.1
Gelang Patah	Lim Kit Siang	DAP	57.2
Batu	Chua Tian Chang	PKR	57.9
Kulai	Teo Nie Ching	DAP	57.9
Taiping	Nga Kor Ming	DAP	58.5
Gopeng	Lee Boon Chye	PKR	58.5
Permatang Pauh	Wan Azizah Wan Ismail	PKR	58.6
Ampang	Zuraida Kamarudin	PKR	58.8
Subang	Sivarasa K. Rasiah	PKR	58.8
Parit Buntar	Mujahid Yusof Rawa	PAS	58.9
Lanang	Alice Lau Kiong Yieng	DAP	59.3
Safe
Kota Bharu	Takiyuddin Hassan	PAS	61.5
Penampang	Ignatius Dorell Leiking	PKR	61.8
Kota Melaka	Sim Tong Him	DAP	62.3
Petaling Jaya; Selatan	Hee Loy Sian	PKR	63.0
Pengkalan Chepa	Izani Husin	PAS	63.2
Bayan Baru	Sim Tze Tzin	PKR	63.4
Stampin	Julian Tan Kok Ping	DAP	63.7
Klang	Charles Anthony R. Santiago	DAP	63.9
Kota Raja	Siti Mariah Mahmud	PAS	63.9
Segambut	Lim Lip Eng	DAP	64.6
Kubang Kerian	Ahmad Baihaki Atiqullah	PAS	64.7
Rasah	Teo Kok Seong	DAP	65.1
Kelana Jaya	Wong Chen	PKR	65.8
Pandan	Rafizi Ramli	PKR	65.9
Puchong	Gobind Singh Deo	DAP	66.7
Serdang	Ong Kian Ming	DAP	67.1
Jelutong	Jeff Ooi Chuan Aun	DAP	70.3
Ipoh Barat	Kulasegaran Murugeson	DAP	72.2
Kota Kinabalu	Wong Sze Phin	DAP	72.2
Bukit Bintang	Fong Kui Lun	DAP	72.8
Batu Kawan	Kasthuriraani Patto	DAP	73.1
Bandar Kuching	Chong Chieng Jen	DAP	73.8
Ipoh Timor	Su Keong Siong	DAP	75.5
Batu Gajah	Sivakumar Varatharaju Naidu	DAP	76.7
Bukit Bendera	Zairil Khir Johari	DAP	77.2
Bagan	Lim Guan Eng	DAP	77.8
Bukit Gelugor	Karpal Singh Ram Singh	DAP	80.1
Bukit Mertajam	Steven Sim Chee Kiong	DAP	80.5
Cheras	Tan Kok Wai	DAP	81.2
Petaling Jaya; Utara	Tony Pua Kiam Wee	DAP	81.3
Kepong	Tan Seng Giaw	DAP	81.8
Tanjong	Ng Wei Aik	DAP	82.8
Seputeh	Teresa Kok Suh Sim	DAP	85.7

GOVERNMENT SEATS
Bachok	Awang Adek Hussin	UMNO	49.2
Kuala Nerus	Mohd Nasir Ibrahim Fikri	UMNO	49.0
Bukit Gantang	Ismail Saffian	UMNO	48.6
Sarikei	Ding Kuong Hiing	SUPP	48.6
Temerloh	Saifuddin Abdullah	UMNO	48.2
Batu Pahat	Mohd Puad Zarkashi	UMNO	48.1
Pasir Puteh	Tuan Mustaffa Tuan Mat	UMNO	48.0
Lembah Pantai	Raja Nong Chik Zainal Abidin	UMNO	47.9
Sepang	Mohd Zin Mohamed	UMNO	47.6
Kuala Krai	Tuan Aziz Tuan Hamat	UMNO	47.5
Telok Kemang	Mogan Velayatham	MIC	47.2
Miri	Sebastian Ting Chiew Yew	SUPP	47.2
Sandakan	Liew Vui Keong	LDP	47.1
Gombak	Rahman Ismail	UMNO	46.9
Sibu	Lau Lee Ming	SUPP	46.6
Pokok Sena	Shahlan Ismail	UMNO	46.5
Marang	Yahya Khatib Mohamad	UMNO	46.4
Kuala Kedah	Zaki Zamani Abd Rashid	UMNO	46.2
Dungun	Rosli Mat Hassan	UMNO	46.2
Bukit Katil	Mohd Ali Rustam	UMNO	46.1
Raub	Hoh Khai Mun	MCA	45.8
Kuala Langat	Sharuddin Omar	UMNO	45.4
Sungai Siput	Devamany S. Krishnasamy	MIC	45.2
Wangsa Maju	Mohd Shafei Abdullah	UMNO	44.9
Kuantan	Mohamed Suffian Awang	UMNO	44.7
Bakri	Lee Ching Yong	MCA	44.7
Alor Setar	Chor Chee Heung	MCA	44.2
Kluang	Hou Kok Chung	MCA	44.2
Kampar	Lee Chee Leong	MCA	43.7
Lumut	Kong Cho Ha	MCA	43.7
Shah Alam	Zulkifli Noordin	UMNO	43.3
Sungai Petani	Syamsyul Anuar Che Mey @ Ismail	UMNO	42.9
Tumpat	Mansor Salleh	UMNO	42.9
Kuala Terengganu	Mohd Zubir Embong	UMNO	42.8
Beruas	Chang Ko Youn	GERAKAN	42.7
Indera Mahkota	Wan Adnan Wan Mamat	UMNO	42.3
Hulu Langat	Adzhaliza Mohd Nor	UMNO	41.7
Gelang Patah	Abdul Ghani Othman	UMNO	41.7
Rantau Panjang	Ghazali Ismail	UMNO	41.6
Telok Intan	Mah Siew Keong	GERAKAN	41.3
Bandar Tun Razak	Tan Kok Eng	MCA	41.2
Nibong Tebal	Zainal Abidin Osman	UMNO	40.7
Ampang	Rozaidah Talib	UMNO	40.2
Permatang Pauh	Mazlan Ismail	UMNO	40.1
Lanang	Tiong Thai King	SUPP	40.1
Taiping	Tan Lian Hoe	GERAKAN	40.0
Padang Serai	Heng Seai Kie	MCA	39.9
Kulai	Tay Chin Hein	MCA	39.9
Parit Buntar	Mua'amar Ghadafi Jamal Jamaludin	UMNO	39.7
Gopeng	Tan Chin Meng	MCA	39.7
Batu	Dominic Lau Hoe Chai	GERAKAN	39.4
Seremban	Yeow Chai Tham	MCA	37.9
Kota Bharu	Mohamad Fatmi Che Salleh	UMNO	37.3
Selayang	Donald Lim Siang Chai	MCA	37.2
Kapar	Sakthivel Alagappan	MIC	36.4
Kota Melaka	Yee Kok Wah	MCA	36.2
Pengkalan Chepa	Dali Husin	UMNO	35.6
Bayan Baru	Tang Heap Seng	MCA	35.3
Stampin	Yong Khoon Seng	SUPP	35.2
Subang	Pakas Rao Applanaidoo	MIC	35.1
Segambut	Jayanthi Devi Balaguru	GERAKAN	34.6
Klang	Teh Kim Poo	MCA	34.5
Kubang Kerian	Anuar Safian	UMNO	34.2
Penampang	Bernard Giluk Dompok	UPKO	33.9
Petaling Jaya Selatan	Sheah Kok Fah	MCA	33.5
Rasah	Teo Eng Kian	MCA	33.3
Kelana Jaya	Loh Seng Kok	MCA	32.4
Kota Raja	Murugesan Sinnandavar	MIC	32.1
Puchong	A. Kohilan Pillay	GERAKAN	31.9
Serdang	Yap Pian Hon	MCA	31.4
Pandan	Lim Chin Yee	MCA	29.4
Jelutong	Ng Fook On	GERAKAN	28.4
Bukit Bintang	Frankie Gan Joon Zin	MCA	26.4
Ipoh Barat	Cheng Wei Yee	MCA	26.0
Bandar Kuching	Tan Kai	SUPP	25.7
Kota Kinabalu	Chin Tek Ming	PBS	24.2
Ipoh Timor	Kathleen Wong Mei Yin	MCA	23.2
Batu Gajah	Loo Thin Tuck	MCA	21.9
Bukit Bendera	Teh Leong Meng	GERAKAN	21.7
Batu Kawan	Gobalakrishnan Narayanasamy	GERAKAN	21.3
Bagan	Chua Teik Siang	MCA	20.6
Bukit Gelugor	Teh Beng Yeam	MCA	19.3
Bukit Mertajam	Gui Guat Lye	MCA	18.5
Cheras	Teoh Chee Hooi	MCA	18.2
Petaling Jaya Utara	Chew Hoong Ling	MCA	18.0
Tanjong	Ng Song Kheng	GERAKAN	16.0
Seputeh	Nicole Wong Siaw Ting	MCA	13.9
Kepong	Chandrakumanan Arumugam	PPP	12.9

NON-GOVERNMENT SEATS
Bentong	Wong Tack	DAP	48.7
Kuala Selangor	Dzulkefly Ahmad	PAS	48.7
Titiwangsa	Ahmad Zamri Asa'ad Khuzami	PAS	48.7
Sungai Besar	Mohamed Salleh M Husin	PAS	48.6
Machang	Wan Zawawi Wan Ismail	PKR	48.5
Pasir Gudang	Ahmad Faidhi Saidi	PKR	48.5
Labis	Ramakrishnan Suppiah	DAP	48.4
Jerai	Mohd Firdaus Jaafar	PAS	48.3
Ketereh	Abdul Aziz Abdul Kadir	PKR	48.3
Setiawangsa	Ibrahim Yaacob	PKR	48.2
Tebrau	Choong Shiau Yoon	PKR	47.9
Baram	Roland Engan	PKR	47.9
Balik Pulau	Muhammad Bakhtiar Wan Chik	PKR	47.5
Ledang	Hassan Abdul Karim	PKR	47.5
Kulim-Bandar Baharu	Saifuddin Nasution Ismail	PKR	47.4
Pendang	Mohamad Sabu	PAS	47.3
Segamat	Chua Jui Meng	PKR	47.3
Pulai	Salahuddin Ayub	PAS	47.3
Bagan Serai	Mohd Nor Monutty	PKR	47.2
Arau	Haron Din	PAS	47.0
Muar	Nor Hizwan Ahmad	PKR	47.0
Beaufort	Lajim Ukin	PKR	46.8
Kuala Kangsar	Khalil Idham Lim Abdullah	PAS	46.6
Merbok	Nor Azrina Surip	PKR	46.3
Baling	Najmi Ahmad	PAS	46.2
Sabak Bernam	Abdul Aziz Bari	PKR	46.1
Sik	Che Uda Che Nik	PAS	45.9
Bagan Datok	Madhi Hasan	PKR	45.7
Jerlun	Ismail Salleh	PAS	45.6
Bera	Zakaria Abdul Hamid	PKR	45.6
Hulu Selangor	Khalid Jaafar	PKR	45.4
Sekijang	Julailey Jemadi	PKR	45.2
Kepala Batas	Afnan Hamimi Taib Azamudden	PAS	44.9
Tanjong Malim	Tan Yee Kew	PKR	44.9
Tanah Merah	Nik Mahmood Nik Hassan	PKR	44.7
Kangar	Baharuddin Ahmad	PAS	44.6
Tasek Gelugor	Abdul Rahman Maidin	PAS	44.5
Padang Rengas	Meor Ahmad Isharra Ishak	PKR	44.5
Jerantut	Hamzah Jaafar	PAS	44.5
Cameron Highlands	Manogaran Marimuthu	DAP	44.2
Kota Marudu	Maijol Mahap	PKR	43.3
Saratok	Ali Biju	PKR	43.2
Tambun	Siti Aishah Shaik Ismail	PKR	43.1
Tanjong Piai	Mahdzir Ibrahim	DAP	43.0
Padang Terap	Mohd Nasir Zakaria	PAS	42.9
Tanjong Karang	Mohamad Rashdi Deraman	PAS	42.9
Besut	Riduan Mohamad Nor	PAS	42.8
Setiu	Omar Sidek	PAS	42.7
Johor Bahru	Md Hashim Hussein	PKR	42.6
Pasir Mas	Ibrahim Ali	IND	42.4
Jeli	Mohd Apandi Mohamad	PAS	42.4
Larut	Mohd Fauzi Sa'ari	PAS	42.3
Lipis	Mohd Mahyudin Ghazal	PAS	42.2
Hulu Terengganu	Kamaruzaman Abdullah	PAS	42.0
Sri Gading	Mohd Khuzzan Abu Bakar	PKR	41.9
Kemaman	Kamarudin Chik	PKR	41.5
Bintulu	John Brian Anthony Anak Jeremy Guang	DAP	41.4
Parit	Muhammad Ismi Mat Taib	PAS	41.2
Tawau	Kong Hong Min	PKR	41.2
Jempol	Wan Aishah Wan Ariffin	PAS	41.1
Kuala Krau	Shahril Azman Abd Halim	PAS	40.9
Simpang Renggam	Suhaizan Kaiat	PAS	40.5
Lenggong	Razman Zakaria	PAS	40.4
Pasir Salak	Mustaffa Kamil Ayub	PKR	40.3
Kubang Pasu	Mohd Jamal Nasir	PAS	40.1
Batu Sapi	Hamza A Abdullah	PAS	39.8
Jelebu	Raj Munni Sabu	PAS	39.6
Paya Besar	Murnie Hidayah Anuar	PKR	39.4
Maran	Mujibur Rahman Ishak	PAS	39.2
Padang Besar	Azamhari Mohamood	PAS	39.0
Ayer Hitam	Hu Pang Chaw	PAS	39.0
Jasin	Rahmat Yusof	PKR	38.7
Kota Belud	Isnaraissah Munirah Majili	PKR	38.4
Alor Gajah	Damian Yeo Shin Li	DAP	38.2
Tuaran	Wilfred Bumburing	PKR	38.0
Ranau	Jonathan Yasin	PKR	37.7
Gerik	Norhayati Kasim	PAS	37.6
Tampin	Abdul Razakek Abdul Rahim	PAS	37.5
Parit Sulong	Khairuddin A Rahim	PAS	37.2
Tangga Batu	Rahim Ali	PKR	37.1
Gua Musang	Wan Abdul Rahim Wan Abdullah	PAS	37.0
Kuala Pilah	Mohd Nazree Mohd Yunus	PKR	37.0
Kanowit	Thomas Laja Besi	PKR	36.4
Pensiangan	Richard Sakian Gunting	PKR	36.1
Rembau	Radzali A. Ghani	PKR	35.6
Sibuti	Muhammad Zaid Tandang	PAS	34.8
Kimanis	Jaafar Ismail	PKR	34.7
Tapah	Vasantha Kumar Krishnan	PKR	34.6
Sembrong	Onn Abu Bakar	PKR	34.0
Pagoh	Mohamad Rozali Jamil	PAS	33.1
Keningau	Geoffrey Gapari Kitingan	STAR	33.0
Mambong	Willie Mongin	PKR	33.0
Pontian	Haniff @ Ghazali Hosman	PKR	32.9
Rompin	Nuridah Mohd Salleh	PAS	32.6
Papar	Mohammad Yahya Lampong	PKR	32.1
Labuan	Ibrahim Menudin	PKR	31.4
Sepanggar	Jeffrey Kumin	DAP	30.9
Putrajaya	Husam Musa	PAS	30.5
Mas Gading	Tiki Lafe	IND	30.0
Langkawi	Ahmad Abdullah	PKR	29.9
Masjid Tanah	Mohd Nasaie Ismail	PAS	28.9
Sipitang	Ramle Dua	PKR	28.4
Tenom	Masdin Tumas	PKR	28.1
Mersing	Roslan Nikmat	PAS	28.0
Lubok Antu	Larry Soon @ Larry Sng Wei Shien	SWP	27.7
Lawas	Baru Langup	DAP	27.7
Putatan	Lee Han Kyun	DAP	26.7
Limbang	Baru Bian	PKR	26.3
Kudat	Rahimah Majid	PKR	26.2
Mas Gading	Mordi Bimol	DAP	26.0
Sri Aman	Nicholas Mujah Ason	PKR	25.1
Libaran	Mohd Serman Hassnar	PKR	25.0
Semporna	Usman Madeaming	PAS	24.6
Tenggara	Muhamad Said Jonit	PAS	24.4
Silam	Badrulamin Bahron	PKR	24.4
Serian	Edward Andrew Luwak	DAP	23.9
Julau	Wong Judat	SWP	23.2
Pekan	Fariz Musa	PKR	23.0
Batang Lupar	Abang Zulkifli Abang Engkeh	PKR	22.5
Betong	Cecilia Siti Una @ Sittie Endek	PKR	22.5
Hulu Rajang	Abun Sui Anyit	PKR	22.3
Keningau	Stephen Sandor	PKR	21.7
Kota Samarahan	Abang Ahmad Kerdee Abang Masagus	PAS	21.6
Selangau	Sng Chee Hua	SWP	21.6
Petrajaya	Ahmad Nazib Johari	PKR	21.4
Kapit	Ramli Malaka	DAP	21.3
Selangau	Joshua Anak Jabing @ Joshua Jabeng	PKR	18.8
Kinabatangan	Abdullah Abdul Sani	PKR	18.3
Sri Aman	Donald Lawan	IND	17.3
Beluran	James Miki	PKR	16.8
Julau	Wong Hong Yu	PKR	16.8
Lubok Antu	Nicholas Bawin Anggat	PKR	16.7
Pensiangan	Martin Tomy	STAR	16.6
Kota Tinggi	Onn Jaafar	PAS	15.7
Semporna	Zamree Abdul Habi	PKR	14.8
Hulu Rajang	George Lagong	SWP	14.4
Pengerang	Tengku Intan Tengku Abdul Hamid	PKR	13.6
Batang Sadong	Mohamad Jolhi	PAS	13.0
Santubong	Zulrusdi Mohamad Hoi	PKR	12.7
Igan	Ajiji Fauzan	PAS	12.6
Silam	Dumi Masdal	IND	12.5
Tenom	Hasmin Abdullah	STAR	11.7
Mukah	Hai Bin Merawin @ Bonaventure	DAP	11.2
Mukah	Sylvester Ajah Subah @ Ajah Bin Subah	IND	11.2
Tanjong Manis	Jurina Mut	PAS	11.0
Libaran	Sahar Saka	IND	10.1
Sepanggar	Chin Hon Kiong	SAPP	9.4
Putatan	Awang Ahmad Sah	STAR	8.8
Kudat	Jutirim Galibai Galabi	STAR	8.5
Tenom	Jaineh Juaya	SAPP	8.4
Ranau	Ulianah Situn	STAR	8.2
Seremban	Abdul Halim Abdullah	BERJASA	7.9
Beluran	Raimon Lanjat	STAR	7.7
Kota Marudu	Majamis Timbong	STAR	6.7
Kota Belud	Jalumin Bayogoh	STAR	6.2
Alor Setar	Abdul Fisol Mohd Isa	BERJASA	6.1
Kinabatangan	Yambuya Parantis	STAR	5.8
Kinabatangan	Ali Latip Taha	IND	5.7
Tapah	Shaharuzzaman Bistamam	BERJASA	5.6
Tuaran	Erveana Ansari Ali	IND	5.6
Kapar	Mohd Pathan Hussin	BERJASA	5.0
Kepong	Yee Poh Ping	IND	4.7
Selayang	Mohd Hazizi Ab. Rahman	BERJASA	4.5
Sepanggar	Daniel John Jambun	STAR	4.4
Padang Serai	Hamidi Abu Hassan	BERJASA	4.1
Cameron Highlands	Mohd Shokri Mahmood	BERJASA	4.0
Subang	Mohamad Ismail	BERJASA	4.0
Tuaran	Samin Dulin	STAR	3.7
Batu Kawan	Huan Cheng Guan	PCM	3.6
Putatan	Duli Mari	SAPP	3.6
Semporna	Mohd Manuke	IND	3.6
Tasek Gelugor	Mohd Shariff Omar	IND	3.3
Pandan	Tan Yew Leng	IND	3.3
Penampang	Melania Annol	STAR	3.1
Saratok	Rosli Bin Lek @ Abg Roselie bin Abg Paleng	IND	3.1
Kanowit	Ellison Ludan Anak Mu	SWP	3.0
Ranau	Yazid Sahjinan	IND	2.9
Beluran	Kamaruddin Mustapha	IND	2.9
Kimanis	Jamil William Core	SAPP	2.8
Kota Raja	Uthayakumar Ponnusamy	IND	2.6
Kudat	Mojurip Diyun	SAPP	2.6
Papar	Balon Mujim	STAR	2.5
Semporna	Siamsir Borhan	IND	2.5
Pengerang	Mohd Azaman Johari	IND	2.4
Kota Belud	Lamsil Amidsor	IND	2.3
Kota Kinabalu	Liew Hock Leong	STAR	2.3
Mas Gading	Patrick Uren	STAR	2.3
Petaling Jaya Selatan	Ibrahim Khatib	IND	2.2
Mambong	Dripin Sakoi	STAR	2.2
Sipitang	Kamis Daming	SAPP	2.1
Silam	Apas Saking	STAR	2.1
Sri Aman	Wilfred Stephen	SWP	2.1
Labuan	Hadnan Mohamad	PAS	2.0
Tenom	Mutang Dawat	KITA	2.0
Baram	Patrick Sibat Sujang	IND	1.9
Batu Sapi	Saiful Bahari Rashada Ahmad	STAR	1.8
Semporna	Malvine Reyes	STAR	1.7
Kuala Kangsar	Kamilia Ibrahim	IND	1.6
Bera	Mohd Wali Alang Ahamad	IND	1.6
Beaufort	Guan Dee Koh Hoi	STAR	1.6
Libaran	Rosnah Unsari	STAR	1.6
Tawau	Chua Soon Bui	SAPP	1.6
Hulu Selangor	Radzali Mokhtar	IND	1.5
Serian	Johnny Aput	STAR	1.5
Cameron Highlands	Alagu Thangarajoo	IND	1.4
Tawau	Ahmad Awang	IND	1.4
Hulu Selangor	Santhara Kumar	IND	1.3
Sepang	Suhaimi Mohd Ghazali	IND	1.3
Batu	Hashim Abdul Karim	IND	1.3
Kota Marudu	Yuntau Kolod	SAPP	1.3
Arau	Zainudin Yom	IND	1.1
Lipis	Aishaton Abu Bakar	IND	1.1
Sungai Petani	Ong Wei Sin	IND	1.0
Bandar Tun Razak	Mohamad Sukeri Abdul Samat	IND	1.0
Kimanis	Lusin Balangon	STAR	1.0
Semporna	Badaruddin Mustapha	IND	1.0
Tapah	Ridzuan Bani	IND	0.9
Tanjong Karang	Masrun Tamsi	IND	0.9
Kapar	Norhamzah Suratman	IND	0.8
Santubong	Affendi Jeman	IND	0.8
Larut	Raveendran M. Vallikana	IND	0.7
Bagan Serai	Abdul Latif Masud	IND	0.7
Paya Besar	Zahari Mamat	IND	0.7
Kapar	Mohd Nazri Abdul Aziz	IND	0.7
Telok Kemang	Kamarudin Kumaravel Abdullah	IND	0.7
Pensiangan	Fatimah Agitor	IND	0.7
Santubong	Mura Kadir	STAR	0.7
Langkawi	Marina Hussein	IND	0.6
Padang Terap	Muhamad Bazli Abdullah	IND	0.6
Padang Serai	Gobalakrishnan Nagapan	IND	0.6
Dungun	Mazlan Harun	IND	0.6
Batu Kawan	Mohan Apparoo	IND	0.6
Nibong Tebal	Teng Kok Pheng	IND	0.6
Telok Intan	Moralingam Kannan	IND	0.6
Miri	Chong Kon Fatt	STAR	0.6
Bagan	Lim Kim Chu	PCM	0.5
Sungai Siput	Nagalingam Singaravelloo	IND	0.5
Kuala Langat	Kottappan Suppaiah	IND	0.5
Rembau	Abdul Aziz Hassan	IND	0.5
Lawas	Alirahman Kamseh	STAR	0.5
Alor Setar	Jawahar Raja Abdul Wahid	MUPP	0.4
Padang Serai	Othman Wawi	IND	0.4
Tanah Merah	Ahmad Fizal Che Harun	IND	0.4
Ipoh Barat	Kalwant Singh Sujan Singh	IND	0.4
Cameron Highlands	Kisho Kumar Kathirveloo	IND	0.4
Indera Mahkota	Ponusamy Govindasamy	IND	0.4
Gombak	Said Nazar Abu Baker	IND	0.4
Kelana Jaya	Toh Sin Wah	IND	0.4
Subang	Nazaruddin Mohamed Ferdoos	IND	0.4
Sepang	Hanapiah Mohamad	IND	0.4
Kota Belud	Kanul Gindol	IND	0.4
Semporna	Freddie Japat Simbol	IND	0.4
Semporna	Yahya Zainal	IND	0.4
Stampin	Soo Lina	STAR	0.4
Sibu	Narawi Haron	IND	0.4
Permatang Pauh	Abdullah Zawawi Samsudin	IND	0.3
Kota Raja	Azman Idrus	IND	0.3
Batu	Nazariah Abbas	IND	0.3
Lembah Pantai	Rusli Baba	IND	0.3
Seremban	John Fernandez	IND	0.3
Kulai	Surendiran Kuppayah	IND	0.3
Sungai Petani	Suhaimi Hashim	KITA	0.2
Kota Bharu	Mohd Zakiman Abu Bakar	IND	0.2
Kuala Terengganu	Maimun Yusuf	IND	0.2
Subang	Edros Abdullah	IND	0.2
Kapar	Palaya Rengaiah	IND	0.2
Batu	Atan Jasin	IND	0.2
Bandar Tun Razak	Mokhtar Salahudin	IND	0.2
Seremban	Bujang Abu	IND	0.1

== Perlis ==
For more details on Pelan dan Helaian Mata (Scoresheet) Bahagian Pilihan Raya Persekutuan Perlis, see footnote

#	Constituency	Winner	Votes	Votes %	Opponent(s)	Votes	Votes %	Majority	Incumbent	Eligible voters	Malay voters	Chinese voters	Indian voters	Others voters	Muslim Bumiputera voters	Non-Muslim Bumiputera voters	Voter turnout	Voter turnout %	Spoilt votes	Spoilt votes %
P001	Padang Besar	Zahidi Zainul Abidin (BN–UMNO)	21,473	59.6%	Azamhari Mohamood (PR–PAS)	14,047	39.0%	7,426	Azmi Khalid (BN–UMNO)	41,974	86%	9%		4%			36,051	85.9%	531	1.3%
P002	Kangar	Shaharuddin Ismail (BN–UMNO)	23,343	53.9%	Baharuddin Ahmad (PR–PAS)	19,306	44.6%	4,037	Mohd Radzi Sheikh Ahmad (BN–UMNO)	51,207	81%	16%	2%				43,316	84.6%	667	1.5%
P003	Arau	Shahidan Kassim (BN–UMNO)	19,376	50.6%	Haron Din (PR–PAS)	18,005	47.0%	1,371	Ismail Kassim (BN–UMNO)	43,876	88%	8%		3%			38,312	87.3%	525	1.2%
P003	Arau	Shahidan Kassim (BN–UMNO)	19,376	50.6%	Zainudin Yom (IND)	406	1.1%	1,371	Ismail Kassim (BN–UMNO)	43,876	88%	8%		3%			38,312	87.3%	525	1.2%

== Kedah ==
For more details on Pelan dan Helaian Mata (Scoresheet) Bahagian Pilihan Raya Persekutuan Kedah, see footnote

#	Constituency	Winner	Votes	Votes %	Opponent(s)	Votes	Votes %	Majority	Incumbent	Eligible voters	Malay voters	Chinese voters	Indian voters	Others voters	Muslim Bumiputera voters	Non-Muslim Bumiputera voters	Voter turnout	Voter turnout %	Spoilt votes	Spoilt votes %
P004	Langkawi	Nawawi Ahmad (BN–UMNO)	21,407	67.2%	Ahmad Abdullah (PR–PKR)	9,546	29.9%	11,861	Abu Bakar Taib (BN–UMNO)	37,536	91%	6%	2%				31,877	84.9%	744	2.0%
P004	Langkawi	Nawawi Ahmad (BN–UMNO)	21,407	67.2%	Marina Hussein (IND)	180	0.6%	11,861	Abu Bakar Taib (BN–UMNO)	37,536	91%	6%	2%				31,877	84.9%	744	2.0%
P005	Jerlun	Othman Aziz (BN–UMNO)	24,161	52.8%	Ismail Salleh (PR–PAS)	20,891	45.6%	3,270	Mukhriz Mahathir (BN–UMNO)	52,383	91%	8%		2%			45,782	87.4%	730	1.4%
P006	Kubang Pasu	Mohd Johari Baharum (BN–UMNO)	33,334	58.4%	Mohd Jamal Nasir (PR–PAS)	22,890	40.1%	10,444	Mohd Johari Baharum (BN–UMNO)	65,550	86%	9%	4%				57,058	87.0%	834	1.3%
P007	Padang Terap	Mahdzir Khalid (BN–UMNO)	20,654	54.6%	Mohd Nasir Zakaria (PR–PAS)	16,212	42.9%	4,442	Mohd Nasir Zakaria (PR–PAS)	41,960	92%	1%		6%			37,800	90.1%	691	1.6%
P007	Padang Terap	Mahdzir Khalid (BN–UMNO)	20,654	54.6%	Muhamad Bazli Abdullah (IND)	243	0.6%	4,442	Mohd Nasir Zakaria (PR–PAS)	41,960	92%	1%		6%			37,800	90.1%	691	1.6%
P008	Pokok Sena	Mahfuz Omar (PR–PAS)	36,198	52.2%	Shahlan Ismail (BN–UMNO)	32,263	46.5%	3,935	Mahfuz Omar (PR–PAS)	80,714	80%	18%	2%				69,309	85.9%	848	1.1%
P009	Alor Setar	Gooi Hsiao-Leung (PR–PKR)	27,364	47.4%	Chor Chee Heung (BN–MCA)	25,491	44.2%	1,873	Chor Chee Heung (BN–MCA)	69,009	61%	34%	5%				57,712	83.6%	1,070	1.6%
P009	Alor Setar	Gooi Hsiao-Leung (PR–PKR)	27,364	47.4%	Abdul Fisol Mohd Isa (BERJASA)	3,530	6.1%	1,873	Chor Chee Heung (BN–MCA)	69,009	61%	34%	5%				57,712	83.6%	1,070	1.6%
P009	Alor Setar	Gooi Hsiao-Leung (PR–PKR)	27,364	47.4%	Jawahar Raja Abdul Wahid (MUPP)	257	0.4%	1,873	Chor Chee Heung (BN–MCA)	69,009	61%	34%	5%				57,712	83.6%	1,070	1.6%
P010	Kuala Kedah	Azman Ismail (PR–PKR)	42,870	52.3%	Zaki Zamani Abd Rashid (BN–UMNO)	37,923	46.2%	4,947	Ahmad Kassim (PR–PKR)	95,328	78%	21%	1%				82,005	86.0%	1,212	1.3%
P011	Pendang	Othman Abdul (BN–UMNO)	32,165	51.5%	Mohamad Sabu (PR–PAS)	29,527	47.3%	2,638	Mohd Hayati Othman (PR–PAS)	70,135	88%	6%		6%			62,451	89.0%	759	1.1%
P012	Jerai	Jamil Khir Baharom (BN–UMNO)	32,429	50.2%	Mohd Firdaus Jaafar (PR–PAS)	31,233	48.3%	1,196	Mohd Firdaus Jaafar (PR–PAS)	74,410	79%	15%	6%				64,614	86.8%	952	1.3%
P013	Sik	Mansor Abd Rahman (BN–UMNO)	22,084	52.6%	Che Uda Che Nik (PR–PAS)	19,277	45.9%	2,807	Che Uda Che Nik (PR–PAS)	46,786	93%	2%		5%			41,992	89.8%	631	1.3%
P014	Merbok	Ismail Daut (BN–UMNO)	38,538	51.9%	Nor Azrina Surip (PR–PKR)	34,416	46.3%	4,122	Rashid Din (PR–PKR)	85,908	65%	17%	18%				74,294	86.5%	1,340	1.5%
P015	Sungai Petani	Johari Abdul (PR–PKR)	44,194	54.7%	Syamsyul Anuar Che Mey @ Ismail (BN–UMNO)	34,646	42.9%	9,548	Johari Abdul (PR–PKR)	93,176	59%	29%	12%				80,771	86.7%	959	1.0%
P015	Sungai Petani	Johari Abdul (PR–PKR)	44,194	54.7%	Ong Wei Sin (IND)	772	1.0%	9,548	Johari Abdul (PR–PKR)	93,176	59%	29%	12%				80,771	86.7%	959	1.0%
P015	Sungai Petani	Johari Abdul (PR–PKR)	44,194	54.7%	Suhaimi Hashim (KITA)	200	0.2%	9,548	Johari Abdul (PR–PKR)	93,176	59%	29%	12%				80,771	86.7%	959	1.0%
P016	Baling	Abdul Azeez Abdul Rahim (BN–UMNO)	43,504	52.5%	Najmi Ahmad (PR–PAS)	38,319	46.2%	5,185	Taib Azamudden Md Taib (PR–PAS)	93,168	89%	5%	5%				82,914	89.0%	1,091	1.2%
P017	Padang Serai	Surendran Nagarajan (PR–PKR)	34,151	53.0%	Heng Seai Kie (BN–MCA)	25,714	39.9%	8,437	Gobalakrishnan Nagapan (IND)	74,095	56%	23%	21%				64,387	86.9%	1,223	1.7%
P017	Padang Serai	Surendran Nagarajan (PR–PKR)	34,151	53.0%	Hamidi Abu Hassan (BERJASA)	2,630	4.1%	8,437	Gobalakrishnan Nagapan (IND)	74,095	56%	23%	21%				64,387	86.9%	1,223	1.7%
P017	Padang Serai	Surendran Nagarajan (PR–PKR)	34,151	53.0%	Gobalakrishnan Nagapan (IND)	390	0.6%	8,437	Gobalakrishnan Nagapan (IND)	74,095	56%	23%	21%				64,387	86.9%	1,223	1.7%
P017	Padang Serai	Surendran Nagarajan (PR–PKR)	34,151	53.0%	Othman Wawi (IND)	279	0.4%	8,437	Gobalakrishnan Nagapan (IND)	74,095	56%	23%	21%				64,387	86.9%	1,223	1.7%
P018	Kulim-Bandar Baharu	Abd. Aziz Sheikh Fadzir (BN–UMNO)	26,782	51.0%	Saifuddin Nasution Ismail (PR–PKR)	24,911	47.4%	1,871	Zulkifli Nordin (IND)	60,910	68%	19%	13%				52,532	86.2%	839	1.4%

== Kelantan ==
For more details on Pelan dan Helaian Mata (Scoresheet) Bahagian Pilihan Raya Persekutuan Kelantan, see footnote

#	Constituency	Winner	Votes	Votes %	Opponent(s)	Votes	Votes %	Majority	Incumbent	Eligible voters	Malay voters	Chinese voters	Indian voters	Others voters	Muslim Bumiputera voters	Non-Muslim Bumiputera voters	Voter turnout	Voter turnout %	Spoilt votes	Spoilt votes %
P019	Tumpat	Kamarudin Jaffar (PR–PAS)	46,191	55.8%	Mansor Salleh (BN–UMNO)	35,487	42.9%	10,704	Kamarudin Jaffar (PR–PAS)	98,632	93%	3%		4%			82,764	83.9%	1,086	1.1%
P020	Pengkalan Chepa	Izani Husin (PR–PAS)	34,617	63.2%	Dali Husin (BN–UMNO)	19,497	35.6%	15,120	Abdul Halim Abdul Rahman (PR–PAS)	64,409	98%	2%					54,797	85.1%	683	1.1%
P021	Kota Bharu	Takiyuddin Hassan (PR–PAS)	40,620	61.5%	Mohamad Fatmi Che Salleh (BN–UMNO)	24,650	37.3%	15,970	Wan Abdul Rahim Wan Abdullah (PR–PAS)	81,268	83%	16%	1%				66,084	81.3%	666	0.8%
P021	Kota Bharu	Takiyuddin Hassan (PR–PAS)	40,620	61.5%	Mohd Zakiman Abu Bakar (IND)	148	0.2%	15,970	Wan Abdul Rahim Wan Abdullah (PR–PAS)	81,268	83%	16%	1%				66,084	81.3%	666	0.8%
P022	Pasir Mas	Nik Mohamad Abduh Nik Abdul Aziz (PR–PAS)	33,431	55.8%	Ibrahim Ali (IND)	25,384	42.4%	8,047	Ibrahim Ali (IND)	71,965	97%	3%					59,930	83.3%	1,115	1.5%
P023	Rantau Panjang	Siti Zailah Mohd Yusoff (PR–PAS)	23,767	56.9%	Ghazali Ismail (BN–UMNO)	17,405	41.6%	6,362	Siti Zailah Mohd Yusoff (PR–PAS)	52,903	98%	1%		1%			41,804	79.0%	632	1.2%
P024	Kubang Kerian	Ahmad Baihaki Atiqullah (PR–PAS)	35,510	64.7%	Anuar Safian (BN–UMNO)	18,769	34.2%	16,741	Salahuddin Ayub (PR–PAS)	65,390	98%	2%					54,884	83.9%	605	0.9%
P025	Bachok	Ahmad Marzuk Shaary (PR–PAS)	35,419	49.5%	Awang Adek Hussin (BN–UMNO)	35,218	49.2%	201	Nasharudin Mat Isa (PR–PAS)	81,566	99%	1%					71,584	87.8%	947	1.2%
P026	Ketereh	Annuar Musa (BN–UMNO)	26,912	50.1%	Abdul Aziz Abdul Kadir (PR–PKR)	25,938	48.3%	974	Abdul Aziz Abdul Kadir (PR–PKR)	62,217	97%	2%		1%			53,726	86.4%	876	1.4%
P027	Tanah Merah	Ikmal Hisham Abdul Aziz (BN–UMNO)	26,505	53.1%	Nik Mahmood Nik Hassan (PR–PKR)	22,278	44.7%	4,227	Amran Abdul Ghani (PR–PKR)	58,237	95%	4%	1%				49,872	85.6%	876	1.5%
P027	Tanah Merah	Ikmal Hisham Abdul Aziz (BN–UMNO)	26,505	53.1%	Ahmad Fizal Che Harun (IND)	213	0.4%	4,227	Amran Abdul Ghani (PR–PKR)	58,237	95%	4%	1%				49,872	85.6%	876	1.5%
P028	Pasir Puteh	Nik Mazian Nik Mohamad (PR–PAS)	33,579	50.8%	Tuan Mustaffa Tuan Mat (BN–UMNO)	31,691	48.0%	1,888	Muhammad Husin (PR–PAS)	76,259	98%	1%		1%			66,040	86.6%	770	1.0%
P029	Machang	Ahmad Jazlan Yaakub (BN–UMNO)	25,660	50.1%	Wan Zawawi Wan Ismail (PR–PKR)	24,855	48.5%	805	Saifuddin Nasution Ismail (PR–PKR)	59,226	96%	4%					51,244	86.5%	729	1.2%
P030	Jeli	Mustapa Mohamed (BN–UMNO)	21,345	56.5%	Mohd Apandi Mohamad (PR–PAS)	16,009	42.4%	5,336	Mustapa Mohamed (BN–UMNO)	43,224	99%			1%			37,778	87.0%	424	1.0%
P031	Kuala Krai	Mohd Hatta Ramli (PR–PAS)	27,919	51.2%	Tuan Aziz Tuan Hamat (BN–UMNO)	25,876	47.5%	2,043	Mohd Hatta Ramli (PR–PAS)	63,101	94%	4%	1%				54,515	86.4%	720	1.1%
P032	Gua Musang	Tengku Razaleigh Hamzah (BN–UMNO)	21,367	61.0%	Wan Abdul Rahim Wan Abdullah (PR–PAS)	12,954	37.0%	8,413	Tengku Razaleigh Hamzah (BN–UMNO)	40,176	80%	7%		12%			35,033	87.2%	712	1.8%

== Terengganu ==
For more details on Pelan dan Helaian Mata (Scoresheet) Bahagian Pilihan Raya Persekutuan Terengganu, see footnote

#	Constituency	Winner	Votes	Votes %	Opponent(s)	Votes	Votes %	Majority	Incumbent	Eligible voters	Malay voters	Chinese voters	Indian voters	Others voters	Muslim Bumiputera voters	Non-Muslim Bumiputera voters	Voter turnout	Voter turnout %	Spoilt votes	Spoilt votes %
P033	Besut	Idris Jusoh (BN–UMNO)	35,232	56.1%	Riduan Mohamad Nor (PR–PAS)	26,890	42.8%	8,342	Abdullah Md Zin (BN–UMNO)	72,566	98%	2%					62,763	86.5%	641	0.9%
P034	Setiu	Che Mohamad Zulkifly Jusoh (BN–UMNO)	33,198	56.1%	Omar Sidek (PR–PAS)	25,255	42.7%	7,943	Mohd Jidin Shafee (BN–UMNO)	67,280	100%						59,138	87.9%	685	1.0%
P035	Kuala Nerus	Mohd Khairuddin Aman Razali (PR–PAS)	33,861	49.9%	Mohd Nasir Ibrahim Fikri (BN–UMNO)	33,251	49.0%	610	Mohd Nasir Ibrahim Fikri (BN–UMNO)	76,238	99%	1%					67,884	89.0%	772	1.0%
P036	Kuala Terengganu	Raja Kamarul Bahrin Shah Raja Ahmad (PR–PAS)	45,828	56.0%	Mohd Zubir Embong (BN–UMNO)	35,043	42.8%	10,785	Mohd Abdul Wahid Endut (PR–PAS)	94,406	89%	10%	1%				81,898	86.8%	845	0.9%
P036	Kuala Terengganu	Raja Kamarul Bahrin Shah Raja Ahmad (PR–PAS)	45,828	56.0%	Maimun Yusuf (IND)	182	0.2%	10,785	Mohd Abdul Wahid Endut (PR–PAS)	94,406	89%	10%	1%				81,898	86.8%	845	0.9%
P037	Marang	Abdul Hadi Awang (PR–PAS)	42,984	52.6%	Yahya Khatib Mohamad (BN–UMNO)	37,860	46.4%	5,124	Abdul Hadi Awang (PR–PAS)	90,795	98%	2%					81,649	89.9%	805	0.9%
P038	Hulu Terengganu	Jailani Johari (BN–UMNO)	31,940	56.5%	Kamaruzaman Abdullah (PR–PAS)	23,727	42.0%	8,213	Mohd Nor Othman (BN–UMNO)	63,543	99%	1%					56,490	88.9%	823	1.3%
P039	Dungun	Wan Hassan Mohd Ramli (PR–PAS)	35,348	51.9%	Rosli Mat Hassan (BN–UMNO)	31,406	46.2%	3,942	Matulidi Jusoh (BN–UMNO)	78,174	96%	4%					68,047	87.0%	909	1.2%
P039	Dungun	Wan Hassan Mohd Ramli (PR–PAS)	35,348	51.9%	Mazlan Harun (IND)	384	0.6%	3,942	Matulidi Jusoh (BN–UMNO)	78,174	96%	4%					68,047	87.0%	909	1.2%
P040	Kemaman	Ahmad Shabery Cheek (BN–UMNO)	45,525	56.9%	Kamarudin Chik (PR–PKR)	33,219	41.5%	12,306	Ahmad Shabery Cheek (BN–UMNO)	91,942	93%	6%	1%				79,971	87.0%	1,227	1.3%

== Penang ==
For more details on Pelan dan Helaian Mata (Scoresheet) Bahagian Pilihan Raya Persekutuan Pulau Pinang, see footnote

#	Constituency	Winner	Votes	Votes %	Opponent(s)	Votes	Votes %	Majority	Incumbent	Eligible voters	Malay voters	Chinese voters	Indian voters	Others voters	Muslim Bumiputera voters	Non-Muslim Bumiputera voters	Voter turnout	Voter turnout %	Spoilt votes	Spoilt votes %
P041	Kepala Batas	Reezal Merican Naina Merican (BN–UMNO)	25,128	53.8%	Afnan Hamimi Taib Azamudden (PR–PAS)	20,952	44.9%	4,176	Abdullah Ahmad Badawi (BN–UMNO)	51,635	76%	19%	4%				46,665	90.4%	585	1.1%
P042	Tasek Gelugor	Shabudin Yahaya (BN–UMNO)	24,393	50.8%	Abdul Rahman Maidin (PR–PAS)	21,351	44.5%	3,042	Nor Mohamed Yakcop (BN–UMNO)	54,042	78%	15%	7%				48,009	88.8%	675	1.2%
P042	Tasek Gelugor	Shabudin Yahaya (BN–UMNO)	24,393	50.8%	Mohd Shariff Omar (IND)	1,590	3.3%	3,042	Nor Mohamed Yakcop (BN–UMNO)	54,042	78%	15%	7%				48,009	88.8%	675	1.2%
P043	Bagan	Lim Guan Eng (PR–DAP)	46,466	77.8%	Chua Teik Siang (BN–MCA)	12,307	20.6%	34,159	Lim Guan Eng (PR–DAP)	68,503	15%	70%	15%				59,735	87.2%	634	0.9%
P043	Bagan	Lim Guan Eng (PR–DAP)	46,466	77.8%	Lim Kim Chu (PCM)	328	0.5%	34,159	Lim Guan Eng (PR–DAP)	68,503	15%	70%	15%				59,735	87.2%	634	0.9%
P044	Permatang Pauh	Anwar Ibrahim (PR–PKR)	37,090	58.6%	Mazlan Ismail (BN–UMNO)	25,369	40.1%	11,721	Anwar Ibrahim (PR–PKR)	71,699	70%	23%	6%				63,332	88.3%	672	0.9%
P044	Permatang Pauh	Anwar Ibrahim (PR–PKR)	37,090	58.6%	Abdullah Zawawi Samsudin (IND)	201	0.3%	11,721	Anwar Ibrahim (PR–PKR)	71,699	70%	23%	6%				63,332	88.3%	672	0.9%
P045	Bukit Mertajam	Steven Sim Chee Kiong (PR–DAP)	55,877	80.5%	Gui Guat Lye (BN–MCA)	12,814	18.5%	43,063	Chong Eng (PR–DAP)	78,996	19%	71%	10%				69,403	87.9%	712	0.9%
P046	Batu Kawan	Kasthuriraani Patto (PR–DAP)	36,636	73.1%	Gobalakrishnan Narayanasamy (BN–Gerakan)	10,674	21.3%	25,962	Ramasamy Palanisamy (PR–DAP)	57,500	21%	56%	23%				50,139	87.2%	723	1.3%
P046	Batu Kawan	Kasthuriraani Patto (PR–DAP)	36,636	73.1%	Huan Cheng Guan (PCM)	1,801	3.6%	25,962	Ramasamy Palanisamy (PR–DAP)	57,500	21%	56%	23%				50,139	87.2%	723	1.3%
P046	Batu Kawan	Kasthuriraani Patto (PR–DAP)	36,636	73.1%	Mohan Apparoo (IND)	305	0.6%	25,962	Ramasamy Palanisamy (PR–DAP)	57,500	21%	56%	23%				50,139	87.2%	723	1.3%
P047	Nibong Tebal	Mansor Othman (PR–PKR)	30,003	57.1%	Zainal Abidin Osman (BN–UMNO)	21,405	40.7%	8,598	Tan Tee Beng (IND)	59,345	45%	37%	18%				52,538	88.5%	833	1.4%
P047	Nibong Tebal	Mansor Othman (PR–PKR)	30,003	57.1%	Teng Kok Pheng (IND)	297	0.6%	8,598	Tan Tee Beng (IND)	59,345	45%	37%	18%				52,538	88.5%	833	1.4%
P048	Bukit Bendera	Zairil Khir Johari (PR–DAP)	45,591	77.2%	Teh Leong Meng (BN–Gerakan)	12,813	21.7%	32,778	Liew Chin Tong (PR–DAP)	71,085	14%	74%	11%				59,019	83.0%	615	0.9%
P049	Tanjong	Ng Wei Aik (PR–DAP)	35,510	82.8%	Ng Song Kheng (BN–Gerakan)	6,865	16.0%	28,645	Chow Kon Yeow (PR–DAP)	51,487	5%	86%	9%				42,870	83.3%	495	1.0%
P050	Jelutong	Jeff Ooi Chuan Aun (PR–DAP)	43,211	70.3%	Ng Fook On (BN–Gerakan)	17,461	28.4%	25,750	Jeff Ooi Chuan Aun (PR–DAP)	71,247	22%	67%	11%				61,441	86.2%	769	1.1%
P051	Bukit Gelugor	Karpal Singh Ram Singh (PR–DAP)	56,303	80.1%	Teh Beng Yeam (BN–MCA)	13,597	19.3%	42,706	Karpal Singh Ram Singh (PR–DAP)	81,897	14%	75%	10%				70,554	86.1%	654	0.8%
P052	Bayan Baru	Sim Tze Tzin (PR–PKR)	43,558	63.4%	Tang Heap Seng (BN–MCA)	24,251	35.3%	19,307	Zahrain Mohamed Hashim (IND)	79,155	39%	49%	11%				68,659	86.7%	850	1.1%
P053	Balik Pulau	Hilmi Yahaya (BN–UMNO)	22,318	51.1%	Muhammad Bakhtiar Wan Chik (PR–PKR)	20,779	47.5%	1,539	Mohd Yusmadi Mohd Yusoff (PR–PKR)	49,641	64%	32%	4%				43,709	88.1%	612	1.2%

== Perak ==
For more details on Pelan dan Helaian Mata (Scoresheet) Bahagian Pilihan Raya Persekutuan Perak, see footnote

#	Constituency	Winner	Votes	Votes %	Opponent(s)	Votes	Votes %	Majority	Incumbent	Eligible voters	Malay voters	Chinese voters	Indian voters	Others voters	Muslim Bumiputera voters	Non-Muslim Bumiputera voters	Voter turnout	Voter turnout %	Spoilt votes	Spoilt votes %
P054	Gerik	Hasbullah Osman (BN–UMNO)	16,415	60.6%	Norhayati Kasim (PR–PAS)	10,199	37.6%	6,216	Tan Lian Hoe (BN–Gerakan)	32,725	68%	16%		13%			27,108	82.8%	494	1.5%
P055	Lenggong	Shamsul Anuar Nasarah (BN–UMNO)	13,639	58.1%	Razman Zakaria (PR–PAS)	9,478	40.4%	4,161	Shamsul Anuar Nasarah (BN–UMNO)	27,950	82%	14%		2%			23,485	84.0%	368	1.3%
P056	Larut	Hamzah Zainudin (BN–UMNO)	22,184	55.6%	Mohd Fauzi Sa'ari (PR–PAS)	16,888	42.3%	5,296	Hamzah Zainudin (BN–UMNO)	46,577	89%	5%	6%				39,929	85.7%	579	1.2%
P056	Larut	Hamzah Zainudin (BN–UMNO)	22,184	55.6%	Raveendran M. Vallikana (IND)	278	0.7%	5,296	Hamzah Zainudin (BN–UMNO)	46,577	89%	5%	6%				39,929	85.7%	579	1.2%
P057	Parit Buntar	Mujahid Yusof Rawa (PR–PAS)	26,015	58.9%	Mua'amar Ghadafi Jamal Jamaludin (BN–UMNO)	17,539	39.7%	8,476	Mujahid Yusof Rawa (PR–PAS)	51,422	68%	27%	5%				44,172	85.9%	618	1.2%
P058	Bagan Serai	Noor Azmi Ghazali (BN–UMNO)	23,014	49.7%	Mohd Nor Monutty (PR–PKR)	21,874	47.2%	1,140	Mohsin Fadzli Samsuri (IND)	54,792	76%	14%	10%				46,313	84.5%	1,096	2.0%
P058	Bagan Serai	Noor Azmi Ghazali (BN–UMNO)	23,014	49.7%	Abdul Latif Masud (IND)	329	0.7%	1,140	Mohsin Fadzli Samsuri (IND)	54,792	76%	14%	10%				46,313	84.5%	1,096	2.0%
P059	Bukit Gantang	Idris Ahmad (PR–PAS)	30,563	50.2%	Ismail Saffian (BN–UMNO)	29,577	48.6%	986	Mohammad Nizar Jamaluddin (PR–PAS)	71,257	65%	25%	10%				60,888	85.4%	748	1.0%
P060	Taiping	Nga Kor Ming (PR–DAP)	37,275	58.5%	Tan Lian Hoe (BN–Gerakan)	25,530	40.0%	11,745	Nga Kor Ming (PR–DAP)	78,148	37%	48%	13%				63,749	81.6%	944	1.2%
P061	Padang Rengas	Mohamed Nazri Abdul Aziz (BN–UMNO)	13,005	53.8%	Meor Ahmad Isharra Ishak (PR–PKR)	10,775	44.5%	2,230	Mohamed Nazri Abdul Aziz (BN–UMNO)	28,518	76%	17%	7%				24,190	84.8%	410	1.4%
P062	Sungai Siput	Michael Jeyakumar Devaraj (PR–PKR)	21,593	51.9%	Devamany S. Krishnasamy (BN–MIC)	18,800	45.2%	2,793	Michael Jeyakumar Devaraj (PR–PKR)	51,596	33%	39%	21%				41,572	80.6%	982	1.9%
P062	Sungai Siput	Michael Jeyakumar Devaraj (PR–PKR)	21,593	51.9%	Nagalingam Singaravelloo (IND)	197	0.5%	2,793	Michael Jeyakumar Devaraj (PR–PKR)	51,596	33%	39%	21%				41,572	80.6%	982	1.9%
P063	Tambun	Ahmad Husni Hanadzlah (BN–UMNO)	42,093	55.3%	Siti Aishah Shaik Ismail (PR–PKR)	32,768	43.1%	9,325	Ahmad Husni Hanadzlah (BN–UMNO)	89,435	64%	22%	12%				76,057	85.0%	1,196	1.3%
P064	Ipoh Timor	Thomas Su Keong Siong (PR–DAP)	49,086	75.5%	Kathleen Wong Mei Yin (BN–MCA)	15,086	23.2%	34,000	Lim Kit Siang (PR–DAP)	81,818	14%	80%	5%				65,006	79.5%	834	1.0%
P065	Ipoh Barat	Kulasegaran Murugeson (PR–DAP)	45,420	72.2%	Cheng Wei Yee (BN–MCA)	16,382	26.0%	29,038	Kulasegaran Murugeson (PR–DAP)	77,761	14%	62%	23%				62,912	80.9%	875	1.1%
P065	Ipoh Barat	Kulasegaran Murugeson (PR–DAP)	45,420	72.2%	Kalwant Singh Sujan Singh (IND)	235	0.4%	29,038	Kulasegaran Murugeson (PR–DAP)	77,761	14%	62%	23%				62,912	80.9%	875	1.1%
P066	Batu Gajah	Sivakumar Varatharaju Naidu (PR–DAP)	53,770	76.7%	Loo Thin Tuck (BN–MCA)	15,360	21.9%	38,410	Fong Po Kuan (PR–DAP)	87,587	11%	74%	15%				70,096	80.1%	966	1.1%
P067	Kuala Kangsar	Wan Mohammad Khair-il Anuar Wan Ahmad (BN–UMNO)	14,218	50.4%	Khalil Idham Lim Abdullah (PR–PAS)	13,136	46.6%	1,082	Rafidah Aziz (BN–UMNO)	33,540	68%	24%	7%				28,208	84.1%	407	1.2%
P067	Kuala Kangsar	Wan Mohammad Khair-il Anuar Wan Ahmad (BN–UMNO)	14,218	50.4%	Kamilia Ibrahim (IND)	447	1.6%	1,082	Rafidah Aziz (BN–UMNO)	33,540	68%	24%	7%				28,208	84.1%	407	1.2%
P068	Beruas	Ngeh Koo Ham (PR–DAP)	21,939	55.5%	Chang Ko Youn (BN–Gerakan)	16,882	42.7%	5,057	Ngeh Koo Ham (PR–DAP)	49,205	33%	52%	15%				39,508	80.3%	687	1.4%
P069	Parit	Mohamad Zaim Abu Hassan (BN–UMNO)	16,253	56.9%	Muhammad Ismi Mat Taib (PR–PAS)	11,756	41.2%	4,497	Mohd Nizar Zakaria (BN–UMNO)	33,503	93%	3%	3%				28,541	85.2%	532	1.6%
P070	Kampar	Ko Chung Sen (PR–DAP)	26,863	54.7%	Lee Chee Leong (BN–MCA)	21,463	43.7%	5,400	Lee Chee Leong (BN–MCA)	63,619	29%	61%	9%				49,146	77.2%	820	1.3%
P071	Gopeng	Lee Boon Chye (PR–PKR)	47,558	58.5%	Tan Chin Meng (BN–MCA)	32,249	39.7%	15,309	Lee Boon Chye (PR–PKR)	97,092	43%	46%	9%				81,263	83.7%	1,456	1.5%
P072	Tapah	Saravanan Murugan (BN–MIC)	20,670	56.1%	Vasantha Kumar Krishnan (PR–PKR)	12,743	34.6%	7,927	Saravanan Murugan (BN–MIC)	45,485	46%	28%	13%				36,855	81.0%	1,052	2.3%
P072	Tapah	Saravanan Murugan (BN–MIC)	20,670	56.1%	Shaharuzzaman Bistamam (BERJASA)	2,053	5.6%	7,927	Saravanan Murugan (BN–MIC)	45,485	46%	28%	13%				36,855	81.0%	1,052	2.3%
P072	Tapah	Saravanan Murugan (BN–MIC)	20,670	56.1%	Ridzuan Bani (IND)	337	0.9%	7,927	Saravanan Murugan (BN–MIC)	45,485	46%	28%	13%				36,855	81.0%	1,052	2.3%
P073	Pasir Salak	Tajuddin Abdul Rahman (BN–UMNO)	24,875	57.4%	Mustaffa Kamil Ayub (PR–PKR)	17,489	40.3%	7,386	Tajuddin Abdul Rahman (BN–UMNO)	51,498	79%	14%	4%				43,372	84.2%	1,008	2.0%
P074	Lumut	Mohamad Imran Abdul Hamid (PR–PKR)	40,308	54.8%	Kong Cho Ha (BN–MCA)	32,140	43.7%	8,168	Kong Cho Ha (BN–MCA)	88,300	51%	35%	12%				73,581	83.3%	1,133	1.3%
P075	Bagan Datok	Ahmad Zahid Hamidi (BN–UMNO)	17,176	52.1%	Madhi Hasan (PR–PKR)	15,068	45.7%	2,108	Ahmad Zahid Hamidi (BN–UMNO)	39,924	55%	20%	24%				32,960	82.6%	716	1.8%
P076	Telok Intan	Seah Leong Peng (PR–DAP)	27,399	56.3%	Mah Siew Keong (BN–Gerakan)	20,086	41.3%	7,313	Manogaran Marimuthu (PR–DAP)	60,483	38%	42%	19%				48,649	80.4%	885	1.5%
P076	Telok Intan	Seah Leong Peng (PR–DAP)	27,399	56.3%	Moralingam Kannan (IND)	279	0.6%	7,313	Manogaran Marimuthu (PR–DAP)	60,483	38%	42%	19%				48,649	80.4%	885	1.5%
P077	Tanjong Malim	Ong Ka Chuan (BN–MCA)	28,225	53.0%	Tan Yee Kew (PR–PKR)	23,897	44.9%	4,328	Ong Ka Chuan (BN–MCA)	64,499	53%	27%	14%				53,237	82.5%	1,115	1.7%

== Pahang ==
For more details on Pelan dan Helaian Mata (Scoresheet) Bahagian Pilihan Raya Persekutuan Pahang, see footnote

#	Constituency	Winner	Votes	Votes %	Opponent(s)	Votes	Votes %	Majority	Incumbent	Eligible voters	Malay voters	Chinese voters	Indian voters	Others voters	Muslim Bumiputera voters	Non-Muslim Bumiputera voters	Voter turnout	Voter turnout %	Spoilt votes	Spoilt votes %
P078	Cameron Highlands	Palanivel K. Govindasamy (BN–MIC)	10,506	46.2%	Manogaran Marimuthu (PR–DAP)	10,044	44.2%	462	Devamany S. Krishnasamy (BN–MIC)	27,980	34%	32%	13%	21%			22,748	81.3%	877	3.1%
P078	Cameron Highlands	Palanivel K. Govindasamy (BN–MIC)	10,506	46.2%	Mohd Shokri Mahmood (BERJASA)	912	4.0%	462	Devamany S. Krishnasamy (BN–MIC)	27,980	34%	32%	13%	21%			22,748	81.3%	877	3.1%
P078	Cameron Highlands	Palanivel K. Govindasamy (BN–MIC)	10,506	46.2%	Alagu Thangarajoo (IND)	308	1.4%	462	Devamany S. Krishnasamy (BN–MIC)	27,980	34%	32%	13%	21%			22,748	81.3%	877	3.1%
P078	Cameron Highlands	Palanivel K. Govindasamy (BN–MIC)	10,506	46.2%	Kisho Kumar Kathirveloo (IND)	101	0.4%	462	Devamany S. Krishnasamy (BN–MIC)	27,980	34%	32%	13%	21%			22,748	81.3%	877	3.1%
P079	Lipis	Abdul Rahman Mohamad (BN–UMNO)	14,863	55.1%	Mohd Mahyudin Ghazal (PR–PAS)	11,394	42.2%	3,469	Mohamad Shahrum Osman (BN–UMNO)	32,324	76%	17%	6%				26,986	83.5%	426	1.3%
P079	Lipis	Abdul Rahman Mohamad (BN–UMNO)	14,863	55.1%	Aishaton Abu Bakar (IND)	303	1.1%	3,469	Mohamad Shahrum Osman (BN–UMNO)	32,324	76%	17%	6%				26,986	83.5%	426	1.3%
P080	Raub	Ariff Sabri Abdul Aziz (PR–DAP)	23,415	52.1%	Hoh Khai Mun (BN–MCA)	20,601	45.8%	2,814	Ng Yen Yen (BN–MCA)	54,214	50%	40%	6%				44,943	82.9%	927	1.7%
P081	Jerantut	Ahmad Nazlan Idris (BN–UMNO)	26,544	53.7%	Hamzah Jaafar (PR–PAS)	22,012	44.5%	4,532	Tengku Azlan Sultan Abu Bakar (BN–UMNO)	58,364	81%	14%	3%				49,461	84.7%	905	1.6%
P082	Indera Mahkota	Fauzi Abdul Rahman (PR–PKR)	30,584	56.1%	Wan Adnan Wan Mamat (BN–UMNO)	23,061	42.3%	7,523	Azan Ismail (PR–PKR)	64,219	65%	29%	6%				54,527	84.9%	689	1.1%
P082	Indera Mahkota	Fauzi Abdul Rahman (PR–PKR)	30,584	56.1%	Ponusamy Govindasamy (IND)	193	0.4%	7,523	Azan Ismail (PR–PKR)	64,219	65%	29%	6%				54,527	84.9%	689	1.1%
P083	Kuantan	Fuziah Salleh (PR–PKR)	25,834	54.1%	Mohamed Suffian Awang (BN–UMNO)	21,319	44.7%	4,515	Fuziah Salleh (PR–PKR)	56,280	63%	33%	4%				47,723	84.8%	570	1.0%
P084	Paya Besar	Abdul Manan Ismail (BN–UMNO)	23,747	58.4%	Murnie Hidayah Anuar (PR–PKR)	16,032	39.4%	7,715	Abdul Manan Ismail (BN–UMNO)	48,067	81%	15%	2%				40,694	84.7%	643	1.3%
P084	Paya Besar	Abdul Manan Ismail (BN–UMNO)	23,747	58.4%	Zahari Mamat (IND)	272	0.7%	7,715	Abdul Manan Ismail (BN–UMNO)	48,067	81%	15%	2%				40,694	84.7%	643	1.3%
P085	Pekan	Najib Razak (BN–UMNO)	51,278	75.2%	Fariz Musa (PR–PKR)	15,665	23.0%	35,613	Najib Razak (BN–UMNO)	80,260	88%	2%		9%			68,218	85.0%	1,275	1.6%
P086	Maran	Ismail Muttalib (BN–UMNO)	19,249	59.1%	Mujibur Rahman Ishak (PR–PAS)	12,774	39.2%	6,475	Ismail Muttalib (BN–UMNO)	38,436	90%	7%		2%			32,595	84.8%	572	1.5%
P087	Kuala Krau	Ismail Mohamed Said (BN–UMNO)	21,575	57.5%	Shahril Azman Abd Halim (PR–PAS)	15,370	40.9%	6,205	Ismail Mohamed Said (BN–UMNO)	43,003	90%	3%		5%			37,548	87.3%	603	1.4%
P088	Temerloh	Nasrudin Hassan (PR–PAS)	28,267	50.1%	Saifuddin Abdullah (BN–UMNO)	27,197	48.2%	1,070	Saifuddin Abdullah (BN–UMNO)	66,105	64%	24%	9%				56,441	85.4%	977	1.5%
P089	Bentong	Liow Tiong Lai (BN–MCA)	25,947	49.4%	Wong Tack (PR–DAP)	25,568	48.7%	379	Liow Tiong Lai (BN–MCA)	62,266	45%	44%	9%				52,503	84.3%	988	1.6%
P090	Bera	Ismail Sabri Yaakob (BN–UMNO)	21,669	50.6%	Zakaria Abdul Hamid (PR–PKR)	19,526	45.6%	2,143	Ismail Sabri Yaakob (BN–UMNO)	50,997	59%	32%		5%			42,830	84.0%	965	1.9%
P090	Bera	Ismail Sabri Yaakob (BN–UMNO)	21,669	50.6%	Mohd Wali Alang Ahamad (IND)	670	1.6%	2,143	Ismail Sabri Yaakob (BN–UMNO)	50,997	59%	32%		5%			42,830	84.0%	965	1.9%
P091	Rompin	Jamaluddin Jarjis (BN–UMNO)	30,040	65.5%	Nuridah Mohd Salleh (PR–PAS)	14,926	32.6%	15,114	Jamaluddin Jarjis (BN–UMNO)	53,596	87%	2%		9%			45,849	85.5%	883	1.6%

== Selangor ==
For more details on Pelan dan Helaian Mata (Scoresheet) Bahagian Pilihan Raya Persekutuan Selangor, see footnote

#	Constituency	Winner	Votes	Votes %	Opponent(s)	Votes	Votes %	Majority	Incumbent	Eligible voters	Malay voters	Chinese voters	Indian voters	Others voters	Muslim Bumiputera voters	Non-Muslim Bumiputera voters	Voter turnout	Voter turnout %	Spoilt votes	Spoilt votes %
P092	Sabak Bernam	Mohd Fasiah Mohd Fakeh (BN–UMNO)	16,510	52.1%	Abdul Aziz Bari (PR–PKR)	14,620	46.1%	1,890	Abdul Rahman Bakri (BN–UMNO)	37,318	81%	13%	5%				31,706	84.9%	576	1.5%
P093	Sungai Besar	Noriah Kasnon (BN–UMNO)	18,695	49.6%	Mohamed Salleh M Husin (PR–PAS)	18,296	48.6%	399	Noriah Kasnon (BN–UMNO)	42,837	66%	31%	2%				37,681	88.0%	690	1.6%
P094	Hulu Selangor	Kamalanathan Panchanathan (BN–MIC)	37,403	49.9%	Khalid Jaafar (PR–PKR)	33,989	45.4%	3,414	Kamalanathan Panchanathan (BN–MIC)	85,697	56%	23%	18%				74,947	87.4%	1,451	1.7%
P094	Hulu Selangor	Kamalanathan Panchanathan (BN–MIC)	37,403	49.9%	Radzali Mokhtar (IND)	1,105	1.5%	3,414	Kamalanathan Panchanathan (BN–MIC)	85,697	56%	23%	18%				74,947	87.4%	1,451	1.7%
P094	Hulu Selangor	Kamalanathan Panchanathan (BN–MIC)	37,403	49.9%	Edmund Santhara Kumar Ramanaidu (IND)	999	1.3%	3,414	Kamalanathan Panchanathan (BN–MIC)	85,697	56%	23%	18%				74,947	87.4%	1,451	1.7%
P095	Tanjong Karang	Noh Omar (BN–UMNO)	20,548	54.5%	Mohamad Rashdi Deraman (PR–PAS)	16,154	42.9%	4,394	Noh Omar (BN–UMNO)	42,333	72%	17%	10%				37,676	89.0%	634	1.5%
P095	Tanjong Karang	Noh Omar (BN–UMNO)	20,548	54.5%	Masrun Tamsi (IND)	340	0.9%	4,394	Noh Omar (BN–UMNO)	42,333	72%	17%	10%				37,676	89.0%	634	1.5%
P096	Kuala Selangor	Irmohizam Ibrahim (BN–UMNO)	27,500	49.6%	Dzulkefly Ahmad (PR–PAS)	27,040	48.7%	460	Dzulkefly Ahmad (PR–PAS)	62,298	64%	13%	22%				55,474	89.0%	934	1.5%
P097	Selayang	William Leong Jee Keen (PR–PKR)	52,343	56.7%	Donald Lim Siang Chai (BN–MCA)	34,385	37.2%	17,958	William Leong Jee Keen (PR–PKR)	105,895	45%	36%	17%				92,315	87.2%	1,435	1.4%
P097	Selayang	William Leong Jee Keen (PR–PKR)	52,343	56.7%	Mohd Hazizi Ab. Rahman (BERJASA)	4,152	4.5%	17,958	William Leong Jee Keen (PR–PKR)	105,895	45%	36%	17%				92,315	87.2%	1,435	1.4%
P098	Gombak	Mohamed Azmin Ali (PR–PKR)	54,827	51.4%	Rahman Ismail (BN–UMNO)	50,093	46.9%	4,734	Mohamed Azmin Ali (PR–PKR)	123,290	74%	13%	11%				106,747	86.6%	1,353	1.1%
P098	Gombak	Mohamed Azmin Ali (PR–PKR)	54,827	51.4%	Said Nazar Abu Baker (IND)	474	0.4%	4,734	Mohamed Azmin Ali (PR–PKR)	123,290	74%	13%	11%				106,747	86.6%	1,353	1.1%
P099	Ampang	Zuraida Kamarudin (PR–PKR)	41,969	58.8%	Rozaidah Talib (BN–UMNO)	28,691	40.2%	13,278	Zuraida Kamarudin (PR–PKR)	83,135	55%	34%	10%				71,398	85.9%	738	0.9%
P100	Pandan	Rafizi Ramli (PR–PKR)	48,183	65.9%	Lim Chin Yee (BN–MCA)	21,454	29.4%	26,729	Ong Tee Keat (BN–MCA)	83,857	44%	48%	7%				73,075	87.1%	1,023	1.2%
P100	Pandan	Rafizi Ramli (PR–PKR)	48,183	65.9%	Tan Yew Leng (IND)	2,415	3.3%	26,729	Ong Tee Keat (BN–MCA)	83,857	44%	48%	7%				73,075	87.1%	1,023	1.2%
P101	Hulu Langat	Che Rosli Che Mat (PR–PAS)	64,127	57.1%	Adzhaliza Mohd Nor (BN–UMNO)	46,860	41.7%	17,267	Che Rosli Che Mat (PR–PAS)	127,347	53%	34%	11%				112,322	88.2%	1,335	1.0%
P102	Serdang	Ong Kian Ming (PR–DAP)	79,238	67.1%	Yap Pian Hon (BN–MCA)	37,032	31.4%	42,206	Teo Nie Ching (PR–DAP)	133,139	39%	49%	11%				118,048	88.7%	1,778	1.3%
P103	Puchong	Gobind Singh Deo (PR–DAP)	62,938	66.7%	A. Kohilan Pillay (BN–Gerakan)	30,136	31.9%	32,802	Gobind Singh Deo (PR–DAP)	107,010	39%	44%	16%				94,335	88.1%	1,261	1.2%
P104	Kelana Jaya	Wong Chen (PR–PKR)	56,790	65.8%	Loh Seng Kok (BN–MCA)	27,963	32.4%	28,827	Loh Gwo Burne (PR–PKR)	101,236	38%	42%	18%				86,287	85.2%	1,171	1.1%
P104	Kelana Jaya	Wong Chen (PR–PKR)	56,790	65.8%	Toh Sin Wah (IND)	363	0.4%	28,827	Loh Gwo Burne (PR–PKR)	101,236	38%	42%	18%				86,287	85.2%	1,171	1.1%
P105	Petaling Jaya Selatan	Hee Loy Sian (PR–PKR)	41,062	63.0%	Sheah Kok Fah (BN–MCA)	21,846	33.5%	19,216	Hee Loy Sian (PR–PKR)	79,558	40%	42%	17%				65,185	81.9%	830	1.0%
P105	Petaling Jaya Selatan	Hee Loy Sian (PR–PKR)	41,062	63.0%	Ibrahim Khatib (IND)	1,447	2.2%	19,216	Hee Loy Sian (PR–PKR)	79,558	40%	42%	17%				65,185	81.9%	830	1.0%
P106	Petaling Jaya Utara	Tony Pua Kiam Wee (PR–DAP)	57,407	81.3%	Chew Hoong Ling (BN–MCA)	12,735	18.0%	44,672	Tony Pua Kiam Wee (PR–DAP)	85,401	14%	77%	7%				70,614	82.7%	472	0.6%
P107	Subang	Sivarasa K. Rasiah (PR–PKR)	66,268	58.8%	Prakash Rao Applanaidoo (BN–MIC)	39,549	35.1%	26,719	Sivarasa K. Rasiah (PR–PKR)	128,543	48%	38%	13%				112,618	87.6%	1,669	1.3%
P107	Subang	Sivarasa K. Rasiah (PR–PKR)	66,268	58.8%	Mohamad Ismail (BERJASA)	4,454	4.0%	26,719	Sivarasa K. Rasiah (PR–PKR)	128,543	48%	38%	13%				112,618	87.6%	1,669	1.3%
P107	Subang	Sivarasa K. Rasiah (PR–PKR)	66,268	58.8%	Nazaruddin Mohamed Ferdoos (IND)	460	0.4%	26,719	Sivarasa K. Rasiah (PR–PKR)	128,543	48%	38%	13%				112,618	87.6%	1,669	1.3%
P107	Subang	Sivarasa K. Rasiah (PR–PKR)	66,268	58.8%	Edros Abdullah (IND)	218	0.2%	26,719	Sivarasa K. Rasiah (PR–PKR)	128,543	48%	38%	13%				112,618	87.6%	1,669	1.3%
P108	Shah Alam	Khalid Samad (PR–PAS)	49,009	55.7%	Zulkifli Noordin (BN–UMNO)	38,070	43.3%	10,939	Khalid Samad (PR–PAS)	99,957	69%	15%	14%				87,942	88.0%	863	0.9%
P109	Kapar	Manivannan Gowindasamy (PR–PKR)	69,849	55.1%	Sakthivel Alagappan (BN–MIC)	46,059	36.4%	23,790	Manikavasagam Sundram (PR–PKR)	144,159	51%	34%	14%				126,709	87.9%	2,379	1.7%
P109	Kapar	Manivannan Gowindasamy (PR–PKR)	69,849	55.1%	Mohd Pathan Hussin (BERJASA)	6,289	5.0%	23,790	Manikavasagam Sundram (PR–PKR)	144,159	51%	34%	14%				126,709	87.9%	2,379	1.7%
P109	Kapar	Manivannan Gowindasamy (PR–PKR)	69,849	55.1%	Norhamzah Suratman (IND)	1,067	0.8%	23,790	Manikavasagam Sundram (PR–PKR)	144,159	51%	34%	14%				126,709	87.9%	2,379	1.7%
P109	Kapar	Manivannan Gowindasamy (PR–PKR)	69,849	55.1%	Mohd Nazri Abdul Aziz (IND)	835	0.7%	23,790	Manikavasagam Sundram (PR–PKR)	144,159	51%	34%	14%				126,709	87.9%	2,379	1.7%
P109	Kapar	Manivannan Gowindasamy (PR–PKR)	69,849	55.1%	Palaya Rengaiah (IND)	231	0.2%	23,790	Manikavasagam Sundram (PR–PKR)	144,159	51%	34%	14%				126,709	87.9%	2,379	1.7%
P110	Klang	Charles Anthony R. Santiago (PR–DAP)	53,719	63.9%	Teh Kim Poo (BN–MCA)	29,034	34.5%	24,685	Charles Anthony R. Santiago (PR–DAP)	97,073	32%	46%	20%				84,095	86.6%	1,342	1.4%
P111	Kota Raja	Siti Mariah Mahmud (PR–PAS)	59,106	63.9%	Murugesan Sinnandavar (BN–MIC)	29,711	32.1%	29,395	Siti Mariah Mahmud (PR–PAS)	105,909	44%	25%	29%				92,563	87.4%	1,102	1.0%
P111	Kota Raja	Siti Mariah Mahmud (PR–PAS)	59,106	63.9%	Uthayakumar Ponnusamy (IND)	2,364	2.6%	29,395	Siti Mariah Mahmud (PR–PAS)	105,909	44%	25%	29%				92,563	87.4%	1,102	1.0%
P111	Kota Raja	Siti Mariah Mahmud (PR–PAS)	59,106	63.9%	Azman Idrus (IND)	280	0.3%	29,395	Siti Mariah Mahmud (PR–PAS)	105,909	44%	25%	29%				92,563	87.4%	1,102	1.0%
P112	Kuala Langat	Abdullah Sani Abdul Hamid (PR–PKR)	40,983	52.2%	Sharuddin Omar (BN–UMNO)	35,625	45.4%	5,358	Abdullah Sani Abdul Hamid (PR–PKR)	88,474	52%	26%	17%				78,551	88.8%	1,523	1.7%
P112	Kuala Langat	Abdullah Sani Abdul Hamid (PR–PKR)	40,983	52.2%	Kottappan Suppaiah (IND)	426	0.5%	5,358	Abdullah Sani Abdul Hamid (PR–PKR)	88,474	52%	26%	17%				78,551	88.8%	1,523	1.7%
P113	Sepang	Mohamed Hanipa Maidin (PR–PAS)	36,800	49.1%	Mohd Zin Mohamed (BN–UMNO)	35,658	47.6%	1,142	Mohd Zin Mohamed (BN–UMNO)	84,362	57%	22%	16%				74,961	88.8%	1,226	1.4%
P113	Sepang	Mohamed Hanipa Maidin (PR–PAS)	36,800	49.1%	Suhaimi Mohd Ghazali (IND)	962	1.3%	1,142	Mohd Zin Mohamed (BN–UMNO)	84,362	57%	22%	16%				74,961	88.8%	1,226	1.4%
P113	Sepang	Mohamed Hanipa Maidin (PR–PAS)	36,800	49.1%	Hanapiah Mohamad (IND)	315	0.4%	1,142	Mohd Zin Mohamed (BN–UMNO)	84,362	57%	22%	16%				74,961	88.8%	1,226	1.4%

== Federal Territory of Kuala Lumpur ==
For more details on Pelan dan Helaian Mata (Scoresheet) Bahagian Pilihan Raya Persekutuan Wilayah Persekutuan Kuala Lumpur, see footnote

#	Constituency	Winner	Votes	Votes %	Opponent(s)	Votes	Votes %	Majority	Incumbent	Eligible voters	Malay voters	Chinese voters	Indian voters	Others voters	Muslim Bumiputera voters	Non-Muslim Bumiputera voters	Voter turnout	Voter turnout %	Spoilt votes	Spoilt votes %
P114	Kepong	Tan Seng Giaw (PR–DAP)	47,837	81.8%	Chandrakumanan Arumugam (BN–PPP)	7,530	12.9%	40,307	Tan Seng Giaw (PR–DAP)	68,035	4%	89%	6%				58,512	86.0%	388	0.6%
P114	Kepong	Tan Seng Giaw (PR–DAP)	47,837	81.8%	Yee Poh Ping (IND)	2,757	4.7%	40,307	Tan Seng Giaw (PR–DAP)	68,035	4%	89%	6%				58,512	86.0%	388	0.6%
P115	Batu	Chua Tian Chang (PR–PKR)	41,672	57.9%	Dominic Lau Hoe Chai (BN–Gerakan)	28,388	39.4%	13,284	Chua Tian Chang (PR–PKR)	85,402	44%	38%	16%				71,988	84.3%	606	0.7%
P115	Batu	Chua Tian Chang (PR–PKR)	41,672	57.9%	Hashim Abdul Karim (IND)	949	1.3%	13,284	Chua Tian Chang (PR–PKR)	85,402	44%	38%	16%				71,988	84.3%	606	0.7%
P115	Batu	Chua Tian Chang (PR–PKR)	41,672	57.9%	Nazariah Abbas (IND)	209	0.3%	13,284	Chua Tian Chang (PR–PKR)	85,402	44%	38%	16%				71,988	84.3%	606	0.7%
P115	Batu	Chua Tian Chang (PR–PKR)	41,672	57.9%	Atan Jasin (IND)	164	0.2%	13,284	Chua Tian Chang (PR–PKR)	85,402	44%	38%	16%				71,988	84.3%	606	0.7%
P116	Wangsa Maju	Tan Kee Kwong (PR–PKR)	31,641	54.4%	Mohd Shafei Abdullah (BN–UMNO)	26,130	44.9%	5,511	Wee Choo Keong (IND)	67,775	53%	36%	9%				58,146	85.8%	375	0.6%
P117	Segambut	Lim Lip Eng (PR–DAP)	41,383	64.6%	Jayanthi Devi Balaguru (BN–Gerakan)	22,184	34.6%	19,199	Lim Lip Eng (PR–DAP)	75,631	33%	53%	12%				64,052	84.7%	485	0.6%
P118	Setiawangsa	Ahmad Fauzi Zahari (BN–UMNO)	26,809	50.8%	Ibrahim Yaacob (PR–PKR)	25,419	48.2%	1,390	Zulhasnan Rafique (BN–UMNO)	62,309	56%	30%	11%				52,730	84.6%	502	0.8%
P119	Titiwangsa	Johari Abdul Ghani (BN–UMNO)	23,034	50.6%	Ahmad Zamri Asa'ad Khuzami (PR–PAS)	22,168	48.7%	866	Vacant (none)	55,282	68%	20%	10%				45,513	82.3%	311	0.6%
P120	Bukit Bintang	Fong Kui Lun (PR–DAP)	30,408	72.8%	Frankie Gan Joon Zin (BN–MCA)	11,009	26.4%	19,399	Fong Kui Lun (PR–DAP)	55,721	14%	73%	11%				41,772	75.0%	355	0.6%
P121	Lembah Pantai	Nurul Izzah Anwar (PR–PKR)	31,008	51.0%	Raja Nong Chik Raja Zainal Abidin (BN–UMNO)	29,161	47.9%	1,847	Nurul Izzah Anwar (PR–PKR)	72,396	55%	23%	20%				60,855	84.1%	519	0.7%
P121	Lembah Pantai	Nurul Izzah Anwar (PR–PKR)	31,008	51.0%	Rusli Baba (IND)	167	0.3%	1,847	Nurul Izzah Anwar (PR–PKR)	72,396	55%	23%	20%				60,855	84.1%	519	0.7%
P122	Seputeh	Teresa Kok Suh Sim (PR–DAP)	61,500	85.7%	Nicole Wong Siaw Ting (BN–MCA)	9,948	13.9%	51,552	Teresa Kok Suh Sim (PR–DAP)	85,976	5%	88%	6%				71,750	83.5%	302	0.4%
P123	Cheras	Tan Kok Wai (PR–DAP)	48,249	81.2%	Teoh Chee Hooi (BN–MCA)	10,840	18.2%	37,409	Tan Kok Wai (PR–DAP)	72,551	10%	82%	7%				59,404	81.9%	315	0.4%
P124	Bandar Tun Razak	Abdul Khalid Ibrahim (PR–PKR)	44,067	56.4%	Tan Kok Eng (BN–MCA)	32,235	41.2%	11,832	Abdul Khalid Ibrahim (PR–PKR)	90,993	53%	37%	9%				78,147	85.9%	861	0.9%
P124	Bandar Tun Razak	Abdul Khalid Ibrahim (PR–PKR)	44,067	56.4%	Mohamad Sukeri Abdul Samat (IND)	793	1.0%	11,832	Abdul Khalid Ibrahim (PR–PKR)	90,993	53%	37%	9%				78,147	85.9%	861	0.9%
P124	Bandar Tun Razak	Abdul Khalid Ibrahim (PR–PKR)	44,067	56.4%	Mokhtar Salahudin (IND)	191	0.2%	11,832	Abdul Khalid Ibrahim (PR–PKR)	90,993	53%	37%	9%				78,147	85.9%	861	0.9%

== Federal Territory of Putrajaya ==
For more details on Pelan dan Helaian Mata (Scoresheet) Bahagian Pilihan Raya Persekutuan Wilayah Persekutuan Putrajaya, see footnote

#	Constituency	Winner	Votes	Votes %	Opponent(s)	Votes	Votes %	Majority	Incumbent	Eligible voters	Malay voters	Chinese voters	Indian voters	Others voters	Muslim Bumiputera voters	Non-Muslim Bumiputera voters	Voter turnout	Voter turnout %	Spoilt votes	Spoilt votes %
P125	Putrajaya	Tengku Adnan Tengku Mansor (BN–UMNO)	9,943	69.0%	Husam Musa (PR–PAS)	4,402	30.5%	5,541	Tengku Adnan Tengku Mansor (BN–UMNO)	15,791	94%		3%	2%			14,418	91.3%	73	0.5%

== Negeri Sembilan ==
For more details on Pelan dan Helaian Mata (Scoresheet) Bahagian Pilihan Raya Persekutuan Negeri Sembilan, see footnote

#	Constituency	Winner	Votes	Votes %	Opponent(s)	Votes	Votes %	Majority	Incumbent	Eligible voters	Malay voters	Chinese voters	Indian voters	Others voters	Muslim Bumiputera voters	Non-Muslim Bumiputera voters	Voter turnout	Voter turnout %	Spoilt votes	Spoilt votes %
P126	Jelebu	Zainudin Ismail (BN–UMNO)	22,114	58.4%	Raj Munni Sabu (PR–PAS)	15,013	39.6%	7,101	Rais Yatim (BN–UMNO)	44,937	63%	26%	6%				37,883	84.3%	756	1.7%
P127	Jempol	Mohd Isa Abdul Samad (BN–UMNO)	31,124	56.9%	Wan Aishah Wan Ariffin (PR–PAS)	22,495	41.1%	8,629	Lilah Yasin (BN–UMNO)	65,213	60%	25%	13%				54,701	83.9%	1,082	1.7%
P128	Seremban	Loke Siew Fook (PR–DAP)	45,628	52.2%	Yeow Chai Thiam (BN–MCA)	33,075	37.9%	12,553	John Fernandez (IND)	102,305	44%	41%	14%				87,359	85.4%	1,486	1.5%
P128	Seremban	Loke Siew Fook (PR–DAP)	45,628	52.2%	Abdul Halim Abdullah (BERJASA)	6,866	7.9%	12,553	John Fernandez (IND)	102,305	44%	41%	14%				87,359	85.4%	1,486	1.5%
P128	Seremban	Loke Siew Fook (PR–DAP)	45,628	52.2%	John Fernandez (IND)	221	0.3%	12,553	John Fernandez (IND)	102,305	44%	41%	14%				87,359	85.4%	1,486	1.5%
P128	Seremban	Loke Siew Fook (PR–DAP)	45,628	52.2%	Bujang Abu (IND)	83	0.1%	12,553	John Fernandez (IND)	102,305	44%	41%	14%				87,359	85.4%	1,486	1.5%
P129	Kuala Pilah	Hasan Malek (BN–UMNO)	24,507	61.0%	Mohd Nazree Mohd Yunus (PR–PKR)	14,846	37.0%	9,661	Hasan Malek (BN–UMNO)	47,671	76%	17%	5%				40,147	84.2%	794	1.7%
P130	Rasah	Teo Kok Seong (PR–DAP)	49,272	65.1%	Teo Eng Kian (BN–MCA)	25,171	33.3%	24,101	Loke Siew Fook (PR–DAP)	88,403	28%	48%	22%				75,651	85.6%	1,208	1.4%
P131	Rembau	Khairy Jamaluddin Abu Bakar (BN–UMNO)	43,053	62.1%	Radzali A. Ghani (PR–PKR)	24,696	35.6%	18,357	Khairy Jamaluddin (BN–UMNO)	79,661	70%	12%	16%				69,291	87.0%	1,217	1.5%
P131	Rembau	Khairy Jamaluddin Abu Bakar (BN–UMNO)	43,053	62.1%	Abdul Aziz Hassan (IND)	325	0.5%	18,357	Khairy Jamaluddin (BN–UMNO)	79,661	70%	12%	16%				69,291	87.0%	1,217	1.5%
P132	Telok Kemang	Kamarul Bahrin Abbas (PR–PKR)	29,848	49.9%	Mogan Velayatham (BN–MIC)	28,269	47.2%	1,579	Kamarul Bahrin Abbas (PR–PKR)	70,524	42%	34%	21%				59,855	84.9%	1,344	1.9%
P132	Telok Kemang	Kamarul Bahrin Abbas (PR–PKR)	29,848	49.9%	Kamarudin Kumaravel Abdullah (IND)	394	0.7%	1,579	Kamarul Bahrin Abbas (PR–PKR)	70,524	42%	34%	21%				59,855	84.9%	1,344	1.9%
P133	Tampin	Shaziman Abu Mansor (BN–UMNO)	29,390	60.4%	Abdul Razakek Abdul Rahim (PR–PAS)	18,228	37.5%	11,162	Shaziman Abu Mansor (BN–UMNO)	57,268	61%	24%	13%				48,660	85.0%	1,042	1.8%

== Malacca ==
#	Constituency	Winner	Votes	Votes %	Opponent(s)	Votes	Votes %	Majority	Incumbent	Eligible voters	Malay voters	Chinese voters	Indian voters	Others voters	Muslim Bumiputera voters	Non-Muslim Bumiputera voters	Voter turnout	Voter turnout %	Spoilt votes	Spoilt votes %
P134	Masjid Tanah	Mas Ermieyati Samsudin (BN–UMNO)	27,688	69.7%	Mohd Nasaie Ismail (PR–PAS)	11,488	28.9%	16,200	Abu Seman Yusop (BN–UMNO)	45,952	82%	13%	4%				39,742	86.5%	566	1.2%
P135	Alor Gajah	Koh Nai Kwong (BN–MCA)	32,594	59.2%	Damian Yeo Shen Li (PR–DAP)	20,997	38.2%	11,597	Fong Chan Onn (BN–MCA)	63,591	59%	28%	13%				55,028	86.5%	1,437	2.2%
P136	Tangga Batu	Abu Bakar Mohamad Diah (BN–UMNO)	39,468	61.4%	Rahim Ali (PR–PKR)	23,835	37.1%	15,633	Idris Haron (BN–UMNO)	73,282	68%	25%		4%			64,288	87.7%	985	1.3%
P137	Bukit Katil	Shamsul Iskandar Md. Akin (PR–PKR)	46,357	52.6%	Mohd Ali Rustam (BN–UMNO)	40,624	46.1%	5,733	Md Sirat Abu (BN–UMNO)	99,438	53%	41%	6%				88,083	88.4%	1,102	1.1%
P138	Kota Melaka	Sim Tong Him (PR–DAP)	49,521	62.3%	Yee Kok Wah (BN–MCA)	28,775	36.2%	20,746	Sim Tong Him (PR–DAP)	92,322	36%	59%	4%				79,464	86.1%	1,168	1.3%
P139	Jasin	Ahmad Hamzah (BN–UMNO)	33,736	59.5%	Rahmat Yusof (PR–PKR)	21,973	38.7%	11,763	Ahmad Hamzah (BN–UMNO)	64,455	71%	18%	10%				56,710	88.8%	1,001	1.6%

== Johor ==
#	Constituency	Winner	Votes	Votes %	Opponent(s)	Votes	Votes %	Majority	Incumbent	Eligible voters	Malay voters	Chinese voters	Indian voters	Others voters	Muslim Bumiputera voters	Non-Muslim Bumiputera voters	Voter turnout	Voter turnout %	Spoilt votes	Spoilt votes %
P140	Segamat	Subramaniam Sathasivam (BN–MIC)	20,037	50.3%	Chua Jui Meng (PR–PKR)	18,820	47.3%	1,217	Subramaniam Sathasivam (BN–MIC)	47,009	44%	46%	10%				39,807	84.7%	950	2.0%
P141	Sekijang	Anuar Abdul Manap (BN–UMNO)	19,934	53.2%	Julailey Jemadi (PR–PKR)	16,927	45.2%	3,007	Baharum Mohamed (BN–UMNO)	43,066	56%	39%	5%				37,448	87.0%	587	1.4%
P142	Labis	Chua Tee Yong (BN–MCA)	15,821	49.5%	Ramakrishnan Suppiah (PR–DAP)	15,468	48.4%	353	Chua Tee Yong (BN–MCA)	37,714	36%	47%	15%				31,978	84.8%	689	1.8%
P143	Pagoh	Muhyiddin Yassin (BN–UMNO)	26,274	64.8%	Mohamad Rozali Jamil (PR–PAS)	13,432	33.1%	12,842	Muhyiddin Yassin (BN–UMNO)	46,793	64%	31%	4%				40,522	86.6%	816	1.7%
P144	Ledang	Hamim Samuri (BN–UMNO)	30,619	50.7%	Hassan Abdul Karim (PR–PKR)	28,652	47.5%	1,967	Hamim Samuri (BN–UMNO)	69,316	53%	41%	5%				60,348	87.1%	1,077	1.6%
P145	Bakri	Er Teck Hwa (PR–DAP)	31,118	53.4%	Lee Ching Yong (BN–MCA)	26,051	44.7%	5,067	Er Teck Hwa (PR–DAP)	67,202	44%	53%	2%				58,270	86.7%	1,101	1.6%
P146	Muar	Razali Ibrahim (BN–UMNO)	20,867	51.0%	Nor Hizwan Ahmad (PR–PKR)	19,221	47.0%	1,646	Razali Ibrahim (BN–UMNO)	48,208	62%	35%	1%				40,892	84.8%	804	1.7%
P147	Parit Sulong	Noraini Ahmad (BN–UMNO)	30,258	60.9%	Khairuddin Abdul Rahim (PR–PAS)	18,505	37.2%	11,753	Noraini Ahmad (BN–UMNO)	56,896	72%	23%		5%			49,715	87.4%	952	1.7%
P148	Ayer Hitam	Wee Ka Siong (BN–MCA)	22,045	58.4%	Hu Pang Chaw (PR–PAS)	14,735	39.0%	7,310	Wee Ka Siong (BN–MCA)	42,913	56%	38%	4%				37,747	88.0%	967	2.3%
P149	Sri Gading	Aziz Kaprawi (BN–UMNO)	22,453	56.4%	Mohd Khuzzan Abu Bakar (PR–PKR)	16,692	41.9%	5,761	Mohamad Aziz (BN–UMNO)	44,816	63%	34%		2%			39,818	88.8%	673	1.5%
P150	Batu Pahat	Mohd Idris Jusi (PR–PKR)	38,563	50.1%	Mohd Puad Zarkashi (BN–UMNO)	37,039	48.1%	1,524	Mohd Puad Zarkashi (BN–UMNO)	88,272	52%	46%		2%			77,047	87.3%	1,445	1.6%
P151	Simpang Renggam	Liang Teck Meng (BN–Gerakan)	19,754	57.0%	Suhaizan Kayat (PR–PAS)	14,048	40.5%	5,706	Liang Teck Meng (BN–Gerakan)	40,143	57%	33%	9%				34,670	86.4%	868	2.2%
P152	Kluang	Liew Chin Tong (PR–DAP)	40,574	54.0%	Hou Kok Chung (BN–MCA)	33,215	44.2%	7,359	Hou Kok Chung (BN–MCA)	86,732	39%	49%	10%				75,081	86.6%	1,292	1.5%
P153	Sembrong	Hishammuddin Hussein (BN–UMNO)	22,841	63.7%	Onn Abu Bakar (PR–PKR)	12,210	34.0%	10,631	Hishammuddin Hussein (BN–UMNO)	41,588	58%	31%	9%				35,860	86.2%	809	1.9%
P154	Mersing	Abdul Latiff Ahmad (BN–UMNO)	26,184	70.2%	Roslan Nikmat (PR–PAS)	10,437	28.0%	15,747	Abdul Latiff Ahmad (BN–UMNO)	44,497	79%	16%		5%			37,299	83.8%	678	1.5%
P155	Tenggara	Halimah Mohamed Sadique (BN–UMNO)	25,698	73.7%	Muhamad Said Jonit (PR–PAS)	8,502	24.4%	17,196	Halimah Mohamed Sadique (BN–UMNO)	39,694	72%	18%	7%				34,876	87.9%	676	1.7%
P156	Kota Tinggi	Noor Ehsanuddin Mohd Harun Narrashid (BN–UMNO)	30,373	82.4%	Onn Jaafar (PR–PAS)	5,799	15.7%	24,574	Syed Hamid Albar (BN–UMNO)	41,894	86%	11%	2%				36,868	88.0%	696	1.7%
P157	Pengerang	Azalina Othman Said (BN–UMNO)	26,992	81.9%	Tengku Intan Tengku Abdul Hamid (PR–PKR)	4,484	13.6%	22,508	Azalina Othman Said (BN–UMNO)	37,999	88%	10%		2%			32,969	86.8%	698	1.8%
P157	Pengerang	Azalina Othman Said (BN–UMNO)	26,992	81.9%	Mohd Azaman Johari (IND)	795	2.4%	22,508	Azalina Othman Said (BN–UMNO)	37,999	88%	10%		2%			32,969	86.8%	698	1.8%
P158	Tebrau	Khoo Soo Seang (BN–MCA)	39,985	50.1%	Steven Choong Shiau Yoon (PR–PKR)	38,218	47.9%	1,767	Teng Boon Soon (BN–MCA)	90,482	47%	38%	13%				79,754	88.1%	1,551	1.7%
P159	Pasir Gudang	Normala Abdul Samad (BN–UMNO)	43,834	49.6%	Ahmad Faidhi Saidi (PR–PKR)	42,899	48.5%	935	Mohamed Khaled Nordin (BN–UMNO)	101,041	47%	38%	11%				88,437	86.0%	1,704	1.9%
P160	Johor Bahru	Shahrir Abdul Samad (BN–UMNO)	44,509	55.8%	Md Hashim Hussein (PR–PKR)	34,014	42.6%	10,495	Shahrir Abdul Samad (BN–UMNO)	96,321	51%	43%	5%				79,807	82.8%	1,284	1.3%
P161	Pulai	Nur Jazlan Mohamed (BN–UMNO)	43,751	51.0%	Salahuddin Ayub (PR–PAS)	40,525	47.3%	3,226	Nur Jazlan Mohamed (BN–UMNO)	100,490	47%	41%	10%				85,763	85.3%	1,487	1.5%
P162	Gelang Patah	Lim Kit Siang (PR–DAP)	54,284	57.2%	Abdul Ghani Othman (BN–UMNO)	39,522	41.7%	14,762	Tan Ah Eng (BN–MCA)	106,726	34%	52%	12%				94,865	88.9%	1,059	1.0%
P163	Kulai	Teo Nie Ching (PR–DAP)	43,338	57.9%	Tay Chin Hein (BN–MCA)	29,888	39.9%	13,450	Ong Ka Ting (BN–MCA)	83,991	33%	56%	10%				74,896	89.2%	1,432	1.7%
P163	Kulai	Teo Nie Ching (PR–DAP)	43,338	57.9%	Surendiran Kuppayah (IND)	238	0.3%	13,450	Ong Ka Ting (BN–MCA)	83,991	33%	56%	10%				74,896	89.2%	1,432	1.7%
P164	Pontian	Ahmad Maslan (BN–UMNO)	27,804	65.0%	Haniff @ Ghazali Hosman (PR–PKR)	14,077	32.9%	13,727	Ahmad Maslan (BN–UMNO)	49,633	69%	28%		3%			42,752	86.1%	871	1.8%
P165	Tanjong Piai	Wee Jeck Seng (BN–MCA)	25,038	55.0%	Mahdzir Ibrahim (PR–DAP)	19,581	43.0%	5,457	Wee Jeck Seng (BN–MCA)	51,875	51%	47%		2%			45,537	87.8%	918	1.8%

== Federal Territory of Labuan ==
#	Constituency	Winner	Votes	Votes %	Opponent(s)	Votes	Votes %	Majority	Incumbent	Eligible voters	Malay voters	Chinese voters	Indian voters	Others voters	Muslim Bumiputera voters	Non-Muslim Bumiputera voters	Voter turnout	Voter turnout %	Spoilt votes	Spoilt votes %
P166	Labuan	Rozman Isli (BN–UMNO)	12,694	65.6%	Ibrahim Menudin (PR–PKR)	6,069	31.4%	6,625	Yussof Mahal (BN–UMNO)	24,474		23%			60%	14%	19,356	79.1%	207	0.8%
P166	Labuan	Rozman Isli (BN–UMNO)	12,694	65.6%	Hadnan Mohamad (PR–PAS)	386	2.0%	6,625	Yussof Mahal (BN–UMNO)	24,474		23%			60%	14%	19,356	79.1%	207	0.8%

== Sabah ==
#	Constituency	Winner	Votes	Votes %	Opponent(s)	Votes	Votes %	Majority	Incumbent	Eligible voters	Malay voters	Chinese voters	Indian voters	Others voters	Muslim Bumiputera voters	Non-Muslim Bumiputera voters	Voter turnout	Voter turnout %	Spoilt votes	Spoilt votes %
P167	Kudat	Abdul Rahim Bakri (BN–UMNO)	21,883	60.2%	Rahimah Majid (PR–PKR)	9,507	26.2%	12,376	Abdul Rahim Bakri (BN–UMNO)	47,249		11%			47%	40%	36,355	76.9%	919	1.9%
P167	Kudat	Abdul Rahim Bakri (BN–UMNO)	21,883	60.2%	Jutirim Galibai Galabi (STAR)	3,083	8.5%	12,376	Abdul Rahim Bakri (BN–UMNO)	47,249		11%			47%	40%	36,355	76.9%	919	1.9%
P167	Kudat	Abdul Rahim Bakri (BN–UMNO)	21,883	60.2%	Mojurip Diyun (SAPP)	963	2.6%	12,376	Abdul Rahim Bakri (BN–UMNO)	47,249		11%			47%	40%	36,355	76.9%	919	1.9%
P168	Kota Marudu	Maximus Johnity Ongkili (BN–PBS)	15,168	45.9%	Maijol Mahap (PR–PKR)	14,326	43.3%	842	Maximus Johnity Ongkili (BN–PBS)	42,197		2%			26%	71%	33,077	78.4%	911	2.2%
P168	Kota Marudu	Maximus Johnity Ongkili (BN–PBS)	15,168	45.9%	Majamis Timbong (STAR)	2,228	6.7%	842	Maximus Johnity Ongkili (BN–PBS)	42,197		2%			26%	71%	33,077	78.4%	911	2.2%
P168	Kota Marudu	Maximus Johnity Ongkili (BN–PBS)	15,168	45.9%	Yuntau Kolod (SAPP)	444	1.3%	842	Maximus Johnity Ongkili (BN–PBS)	42,197		2%			26%	71%	33,077	78.4%	911	2.2%
P169	Kota Belud	Abdul Rahman Dahlan (BN–UMNO)	21,768	50.1%	Isnaraissah Munirah Majilis (PR–PKR)	16,673	38.4%	5,095	Abdul Rahman Dahlan (BN–UMNO)	51,467		2%			59%	39%	43,423	84.4%	1,109	2.2%
P169	Kota Belud	Abdul Rahman Dahlan (BN–UMNO)	21,768	50.1%	Jalumin Bayogoh (STAR)	2,709	6.2%	5,095	Abdul Rahman Dahlan (BN–UMNO)	51,467		2%			59%	39%	43,423	84.4%	1,109	2.2%
P169	Kota Belud	Abdul Rahman Dahlan (BN–UMNO)	21,768	50.1%	Lamsil Amidsor (IND)	979	2.3%	5,095	Abdul Rahman Dahlan (BN–UMNO)	51,467		2%			59%	39%	43,423	84.4%	1,109	2.2%
P169	Kota Belud	Abdul Rahman Dahlan (BN–UMNO)	21,768	50.1%	Kanul Gindol (IND)	185	0.4%	5,095	Abdul Rahman Dahlan (BN–UMNO)	51,467		2%			59%	39%	43,423	84.4%	1,109	2.2%
P170	Tuaran	Wilfred Madius Tangau (BN–UPKO)	20,685	50.8%	Wilfred Bumburing (PR–PKR)	15,495	38.0%	5,190	Wilfred Bumburing (IND)	48,276		6%			44%	50%	40,748	84.4%	795	1.6%
P170	Tuaran	Wilfred Madius Tangau (BN–UPKO)	20,685	50.8%	Erveana Ansari Ali (IND)	2,264	5.6%	5,190	Wilfred Bumburing (IND)	48,276		6%			44%	50%	40,748	84.4%	795	1.6%
P170	Tuaran	Wilfred Madius Tangau (BN–UPKO)	20,685	50.8%	Samin Dulin (STAR)	1,509	3.7%	5,190	Wilfred Bumburing (IND)	48,276		6%			44%	50%	40,748	84.4%	795	1.6%
P171	Sepanggar	Jumat Idris (BN–UMNO)	22,845	52.6%	Jeffrey Kumin (PR–DAP)	13,403	30.9%	9,442	Eric Majimbun (SAPP)	53,374		19%			52%	26%	43,416	81.3%	1,167	2.2%
P171	Sepanggar	Jumat Idris (BN–UMNO)	22,845	52.6%	Chin Hon Kiong (SAPP)	4,070	9.4%	9,442	Eric Majimbun (SAPP)	53,374		19%			52%	26%	43,416	81.3%	1,167	2.2%
P171	Sepanggar	Jumat Idris (BN–UMNO)	22,845	52.6%	Daniel John Jambun (STAR)	1,931	4.4%	9,442	Eric Majimbun (SAPP)	53,374		19%			52%	26%	43,416	81.3%	1,167	2.2%
P172	Kota Kinabalu	Jimmy Wong Sze Phin (PR–DAP)	28,516	72.2%	Chin Tek Ming (BN–PBS)	9,557	24.2%	18,959	Hiew King Chew (PR–DAP)	50,516		70%			15%	13%	39,488	78.2%	506	1.0%
P172	Kota Kinabalu	Jimmy Wong Sze Phin (PR–DAP)	28,516	72.2%	Liew Hock Leong (STAR)	909	2.3%	18,959	Hiew King Chew (PR–DAP)	50,516		70%			15%	13%	39,488	78.2%	506	1.0%
P173	Putatan	Marcus Mojigoh (BN–UPKO)	17,465	58.7%	Joseph Lee Han Kyun (PR–DAP)	7,958	26.7%	9,507	Marcus Mojigoh (BN–UPKO)	37,490		19%			63%	15%	29,760	79.4%	665	1.8%
P173	Putatan	Marcus Mojigoh (BN–UPKO)	17,465	58.7%	Awang Ahmad Sah (STAR)	2,604	8.8%	9,507	Marcus Mojigoh (BN–UPKO)	37,490		19%			63%	15%	29,760	79.4%	665	1.8%
P173	Putatan	Marcus Mojigoh (BN–UPKO)	17,465	58.7%	Duli Mari (SAPP)	1,068	3.6%	9,507	Marcus Mojigoh (BN–UPKO)	37,490		19%			63%	15%	29,760	79.4%	665	1.8%
P174	Penampang	Ignatius Dorell Leiking (PR–PKR)	22,598	61.8%	Bernard Giluk Dompok (BN–UPKO)	12,382	33.9%	10,216	Bernard Giluk Dompok (BN–UPKO)	44,323		32%			16%	50%	36,553	82.5%	454	1.0%
P174	Penampang	Ignatius Dorell Leiking (PR–PKR)	22,598	61.8%	Melania Annol (STAR)	1,119	3.1%	10,216	Bernard Giluk Dompok (BN–UPKO)	44,323		32%			16%	50%	36,553	82.5%	454	1.0%
P175	Papar	Rosnah Abdul Rashid Shirlin (BN–UMNO)	21,196	63.9%	Mohammad Yahya Lampong (PR–PKR)	10,661	32.1%	10,535	Rosnah Abdul Rashid Shirlin (BN–UMNO)	38,771		9%			60%	30%	33,194	85.6%	499	1.3%
P175	Papar	Rosnah Abdul Rashid Shirlin (BN–UMNO)	21,196	63.9%	Balon Mujim (STAR)	838	2.5%	10,535	Rosnah Abdul Rashid Shirlin (BN–UMNO)	38,771		9%			60%	30%	33,194	85.6%	499	1.3%
P176	Kimanis	Anifah Aman (BN–UMNO)	13,754	59.5%	Jaafar Ismail (PR–PKR)	8,031	34.7%	5,723	Anifah Aman (BN–UMNO)	26,628		4%			60%	34%	23,128	86.9%	453	1.7%
P176	Kimanis	Anifah Aman (BN–UMNO)	13,754	59.5%	Jamil William Core (SAPP)	650	2.8%	5,723	Anifah Aman (BN–UMNO)	26,628		4%			60%	34%	23,128	86.9%	453	1.7%
P176	Kimanis	Anifah Aman (BN–UMNO)	13,754	59.5%	Lusin Balangon (STAR)	240	1.0%	5,723	Anifah Aman (BN–UMNO)	26,628		4%			60%	34%	23,128	86.9%	453	1.7%
P177	Beaufort	Azizah Mohd Dun (BN–UMNO)	12,827	49.4%	Lajim Ukin (PR–PKR)	12,155	46.8%	672	Lajim Ukin (IND)	30,097		8%			61%	30%	25,949	86.2%	559	1.9%
P177	Beaufort	Azizah Mohd Dun (BN–UMNO)	12,827	49.4%	Guan Dee Koh Hoi (STAR)	409	1.6%	672	Lajim Ukin (IND)	30,097		8%			61%	30%	25,949	86.2%	559	1.9%
P178	Sipitang	Sapawi Ahmad (BN–UMNO)	16,377	67.3%	Ramle Dua (PR–PKR)	6,908	28.4%	9,469	Sapawi Ahmad (BN–UMNO)	29,177		4%			58%	36%	24,329	83.4%	539	1.8%
P178	Sipitang	Sapawi Ahmad (BN–UMNO)	16,377	67.3%	Kamis Daming (SAPP)	505	2.1%	9,469	Sapawi Ahmad (BN–UMNO)	29,177		4%			58%	36%	24,329	83.4%	539	1.8%
P179	Ranau	Ewon Ebin (BN–UPKO)	15,434	49.2%	Jonathan Yasin (PR–PKR)	11,823	37.7%	3,611	Siringan Gubat (BN–UPKO)	39,053		2%			11%	87%	31,396	80.4%	666	1.7%
P179	Ranau	Ewon Ebin (BN–UPKO)	15,434	49.2%	Ulianah Situn (STAR)	2,559	8.2%	3,611	Siringan Gubat (BN–UPKO)	39,053		2%			11%	87%	31,396	80.4%	666	1.7%
P179	Ranau	Ewon Ebin (BN–UPKO)	15,434	49.2%	Yazid Sahjinan (IND)	914	2.9%	3,611	Siringan Gubat (BN–UPKO)	39,053		2%			11%	87%	31,396	80.4%	666	1.7%
P180	Keningau	Joseph Pairin Kitingan (BN–PBS)	15,818	43.8%	Geoffrey Gapari Kitingan (STAR)	11,900	33.0%	3,918	Joseph Pairin Kitingan (BN–PBS)	43,691		10%			18%	70%	36,098	82.6%	555	1.3%
P180	Keningau	Joseph Pairin Kitingan (BN–PBS)	15,818	43.8%	Stephen Sandor (PR–PKR)	7,825	21.7%	3,918	Joseph Pairin Kitingan (BN–PBS)	43,691		10%			18%	70%	36,098	82.6%	555	1.3%
P181	Tenom	Raime Unggi (BN–UMNO)	9,771	46.7%	Masdin Tumas (PR–PKR)	5,885	28.1%	3,886	Raime Unggi (BN–UMNO)	25,304		12%			21%	66%	20,926	82.7%	632	2.5%
P181	Tenom	Raime Unggi (BN–UMNO)	9,771	46.7%	Hasmin Abdullah (STAR)	2,449	11.7%	3,886	Raime Unggi (BN–UMNO)	25,304		12%			21%	66%	20,926	82.7%	632	2.5%
P181	Tenom	Raime Unggi (BN–UMNO)	9,771	46.7%	Jaineh Juaya (SAPP)	1,766	8.4%	3,886	Raime Unggi (BN–UMNO)	25,304		12%			21%	66%	20,926	82.7%	632	2.5%
P181	Tenom	Raime Unggi (BN–UMNO)	9,771	46.7%	Mutang Dawat (KITA)	423	2.0%	3,886	Raime Unggi (BN–UMNO)	25,304		12%			21%	66%	20,926	82.7%	632	2.5%
P182	Pensiangan	Joseph Kurup (BN–PBRS)	9,467	44.3%	Richard Sakian Gunting (PR–PKR)	7,723	36.1%	1,744	Joseph Kurup (BN–PBRS)	26,194		1%			12%	86%	21,379	81.6%	483	1.8%
P182	Pensiangan	Joseph Kurup (BN–PBRS)	9,467	44.3%	Martin Tomy (STAR)	3,554	16.6%	1,744	Joseph Kurup (BN–PBRS)	26,194		1%			12%	86%	21,379	81.6%	483	1.8%
P182	Pensiangan	Joseph Kurup (BN–PBRS)	9,467	44.3%	Fatimah Agitor (IND)	152	0.7%	1,744	Joseph Kurup (BN–PBRS)	26,194		1%			12%	86%	21,379	81.6%	483	1.8%
P183	Beluran	Ronald Kiandee (BN–UMNO)	13,174	69.7%	James Miki (PR–PKR)	3,186	16.8%	9,988	Ronald Kiandee (BN–UMNO)	24,688				3%	40%	56%	18,914	76.6%	552	2.2%
P183	Beluran	Ronald Kiandee (BN–UMNO)	13,174	69.7%	Raimon Lanjat (STAR)	1,460	7.7%	9,988	Ronald Kiandee (BN–UMNO)	24,688				3%	40%	56%	18,914	76.6%	552	2.2%
P183	Beluran	Ronald Kiandee (BN–UMNO)	13,174	69.7%	Kamaruddin Mustapha (IND)	542	2.9%	9,988	Ronald Kiandee (BN–UMNO)	24,688				3%	40%	56%	18,914	76.6%	552	2.2%
P184	Libaran	Juslie Ajirol (BN–UMNO)	19,584	61.2%	Mohd Serman Hassnar (PR–PKR)	7,998	25.0%	11,586	Juslie Ajirol (BN–UMNO)	39,772		21%			57%	15%	32,017	80.5%	714	1.8%
P184	Libaran	Juslie Ajirol (BN–UMNO)	19,584	61.2%	Sahar Saka (IND)	3,219	10.1%	11,586	Juslie Ajirol (BN–UMNO)	39,772		21%			57%	15%	32,017	80.5%	714	1.8%
P184	Libaran	Juslie Ajirol (BN–UMNO)	19,584	61.2%	Rosnah Unsari (STAR)	502	1.6%	11,586	Juslie Ajirol (BN–UMNO)	39,772		21%			57%	15%	32,017	80.5%	714	1.8%
P185	Batu Sapi	Linda Tsen Thau Lin (BN–PBS)	13,085	56.0%	Hamza A Abdullah (PR–PAS)	9,287	39.8%	3,798	Linda Tsen Thau Lin (BN–PBS)	30,199		33%			51%	8%	23,356	77.3%	574	1.9%
P185	Batu Sapi	Linda Tsen Thau Lin (BN–PBS)	13,085	56.0%	Saiful Bahari Rashada Ahmad (STAR)	410	1.8%	3,798	Linda Tsen Thau Lin (BN–PBS)	30,199		33%			51%	8%	23,356	77.3%	574	1.9%
P186	Sandakan	Stephen Wong Tien Fatt (PR–DAP)	14,226	51.0%	Liew Vui Keong (BN–LDP)	13,138	47.1%	1,088	Liew Vui Keong (BN–LDP)	37,058		53%			34%	8%	27,889	75.3%	525	1.4%
P187	Kinabatangan	Bung Moktar Radin (BN–UMNO)	13,377	67.0%	Abdullah Abdul Sani (PR–PKR)	3,646	18.3%	9,731	Bung Moktar Radin (BN–UMNO)	24,748				6%	42%	52%	19,960	80.7%	654	2.6%
P187	Kinabatangan	Bung Moktar Radin (BN–UMNO)	13,377	67.0%	Yambuya Parantis (STAR)	1,153	5.8%	9,731	Bung Moktar Radin (BN–UMNO)	24,748				6%	42%	52%	19,960	80.7%	654	2.6%
P187	Kinabatangan	Bung Moktar Radin (BN–UMNO)	13,377	67.0%	Ali Latip Taha (IND)	1,130	5.7%	9,731	Bung Moktar Radin (BN–UMNO)	24,748				6%	42%	52%	19,960	80.7%	654	2.6%
P188	Silam	Nasrun Mansur (BN–UMNO)	23,058	58.2%	Badrulamin Bahron (PR–PKR)	9,671	24.4%	13,387	Salleh Kalbi (BN–UMNO)	51,662		13%			64%	13%	39,606	76.7%	1,077	2.1%
P188	Silam	Nasrun Mansur (BN–UMNO)	23,058	58.2%	Dumi Masdal (IND)	4,959	12.5%	13,387	Salleh Kalbi (BN–UMNO)	51,662		13%			64%	13%	39,606	76.7%	1,077	2.1%
P188	Silam	Nasrun Mansur (BN–UMNO)	23,058	58.2%	Apas Saking (STAR)	841	2.1%	13,387	Salleh Kalbi (BN–UMNO)	51,662		13%			64%	13%	39,606	76.7%	1,077	2.1%
P189	Semporna	Mohd Shafie Apdal (BN–UMNO)	25,559	81.1%	Zamree Abdul Habi (PR–PKR)	4,654	14.8%	20,905	Mohd Shafie Apdal (BN–UMNO)	41,549		2%		2%	96%		31,523	75.9%	985	2.4%
P189	Semporna	Mohd Shafie Apdal (BN–UMNO)	25,559	81.1%	Badaruddin Mustapha (IND)	325	1.0%	20,905	Mohd Shafie Apdal (BN–UMNO)	41,549		2%		2%	96%		31,523	75.9%	985	2.4%
P190	Tawau	Yap Kain Ching (BN–PBS)	21,331	53.8%	Kong Hong Min (PR–PKR)	16,352	41.2%	4,979	Chua Soon Bui (SAPP)	51,538		38%		8%	50%		39,658	76.9%	789	1.5%
P190	Tawau	Yap Kain Ching (BN–PBS)	21,331	53.8%	Chua Soon Bui (SAPP)	633	1.6%	4,979	Chua Soon Bui (SAPP)	51,538		38%		8%	50%		39,658	76.9%	789	1.5%
P190	Tawau	Yap Kain Ching (BN–PBS)	21,331	53.8%	Ahmad Awang (IND)	553	1.4%	4,979	Chua Soon Bui (SAPP)	51,538		38%		8%	50%		39,658	76.9%	789	1.5%
P191	Kalabakan	Abdul Ghapur Salleh (BN–UMNO)	23,125	64.0%	Usman Madeaming (PR–PAS)	8,904	24.6%	14,221	Abdul Ghapur Salleh (BN–UMNO)	46,793		11%		12%	70%		36,132	77.2%	1,027	2.2%
P191	Kalabakan	Abdul Ghapur Salleh (BN–UMNO)	23,125	64.0%	Mohd Manuke (IND)	1,313	3.6%	14,221	Abdul Ghapur Salleh (BN–UMNO)	46,793		11%		12%	70%		36,132	77.2%	1,027	2.2%
P191	Kalabakan	Abdul Ghapur Salleh (BN–UMNO)	23,125	64.0%	Siamsir Borhan (IND)	891	2.5%	14,221	Abdul Ghapur Salleh (BN–UMNO)	46,793		11%		12%	70%		36,132	77.2%	1,027	2.2%
P191	Kalabakan	Abdul Ghapur Salleh (BN–UMNO)	23,125	64.0%	Malvine Reyes (STAR)	603	1.7%	14,221	Abdul Ghapur Salleh (BN–UMNO)	46,793		11%		12%	70%		36,132	77.2%	1,027	2.2%
P191	Kalabakan	Abdul Ghapur Salleh (BN–UMNO)	23,125	64.0%	Freddie Japat Simbol (IND)	137	0.4%	14,221	Abdul Ghapur Salleh (BN–UMNO)	46,793		11%		12%	70%		36,132	77.2%	1,027	2.2%
P191	Kalabakan	Abdul Ghapur Salleh (BN–UMNO)	23,125	64.0%	Yahya Zainal (IND)	132	0.4%	14,221	Abdul Ghapur Salleh (BN–UMNO)	46,793		11%		12%	70%		36,132	77.2%	1,027	2.2%

== Sarawak ==
#	Constituency	Winner	Votes	Votes %	Opponent(s)	Votes	Votes %	Majority	Incumbent	Eligible voters	Malay voters	Chinese voters	Indian voters	Others voters	Muslim Bumiputera voters	Non-Muslim Bumiputera voters	Voter turnout	Voter turnout %	Spoilt votes	Spoilt votes %
P192	Mas Gading	Anthony Nogeh Gumbek (BN–SPDP)	8,265	40.6%	Tiki Lafe (IND)	6,109	30.0%	2,156	Tiki Lafe (BN–SPDP)	25,771		19%			13%	68%	20,353	79.0%	224	0.9%
P192	Mas Gading	Anthony Nogeh Gumbek (BN–SPDP)	8,265	40.6%	Mordi Bimol (PR–DAP)	5,293	26.0%	2,156	Tiki Lafe (BN–SPDP)	25,771		19%			13%	68%	20,353	79.0%	224	0.9%
P192	Mas Gading	Anthony Nogeh Gumbek (BN–SPDP)	8,265	40.6%	Patrick Uren (STAR)	462	2.3%	2,156	Tiki Lafe (BN–SPDP)	25,771		19%			13%	68%	20,353	79.0%	224	0.9%
P193	Santubong	Wan Junaidi Tuanku Jaafar (BN–PBB)	24,655	84.4%	Zulrusdi Mohamad Hoi (PR–PKR)	3,719	12.7%	20,936	Wan Junaidi Tuanku Jaafar (BN–PBB)	37,017		8%			83%	9%	29,207	78.9%	394	1.1%
P193	Santubong	Wan Junaidi Tuanku Jaafar (BN–PBB)	24,655	84.4%	Affendi Jeman (IND)	233	0.8%	20,936	Wan Junaidi Tuanku Jaafar (BN–PBB)	37,017		8%			83%	9%	29,207	78.9%	394	1.1%
P193	Santubong	Wan Junaidi Tuanku Jaafar (BN–PBB)	24,655	84.4%	Mura Kadir (STAR)	206	0.7%	20,936	Wan Junaidi Tuanku Jaafar (BN–PBB)	37,017		8%			83%	9%	29,207	78.9%	394	1.1%
P194	Petra Jaya	Fadillah Yusof (BN–PBB)	29,559	77.8%	Ahmad Nazib Johari (PR–PKR)	8,116	21.4%	21,443	Fadillah Yusof (BN–PBB)	49,750		12%			79%	8%	37,996	76.4%	321	0.6%
P195	Bandar Kuching	Chong Chieng Jen (PR–DAP)	30,133	73.8%	Tan Kai (BN–SUPP)	10,491	25.7%	19,642	Chong Chieng Jen (PR–DAP)	53,336		91%			5%	3%	40,825	76.5%	201	0.4%
P196	Stampin	Julian Tan Kok Ping (PR–DAP)	41,663	63.7%	Yong Khoon Seng (BN–SUPP)	22,993	35.2%	18,670	Yong Khoon Seng (BN–SUPP)	84,732		73%			13%	13%	65,383	77.2%	488	0.6%
P196	Stampin	Julian Tan Kok Ping (PR–DAP)	41,663	63.7%	Soo Lina (STAR)	239	0.4%	18,670	Yong Khoon Seng (BN–SUPP)	84,732		73%			13%	13%	65,383	77.2%	488	0.6%
P197	Kota Samarahan	Rubiah Wang (BN–PBB)	24,202	76.8%	Abang Ahmad Kerdee Abang Masagus (PR–PAS)	6,801	21.6%	17,401	Sulaiman Abdul Rahman Taib (BN–PBB)	38,158		12%			65%	22%	31,531	82.6%	528	1.4%
P198	Mambong	James Dawos Mamit (BN–PBB)	20,461	62.8%	Willie Mongin (PR–PKR)	10,740	33.0%	9,721	James Dawos Mamit (BN–PBB)	42,344		27%			12%	61%	32,579	76.9%	674	1.6%
P198	Mambong	James Dawos Mamit (BN–PBB)	20,461	62.8%	Dripin Sakoi (STAR)	704	2.2%	9,721	James Dawos Mamit (BN–PBB)	42,344		27%			12%	61%	32,579	76.9%	674	1.6%
P199	Serian	Richard Riot Jaem (BN–SUPP)	19,494	73.5%	Edward Andrew Luwak (PR–DAP)	6,343	23.9%	13,151	Richard Riot Jaem (BN–SUPP)	33,713		11%			15%	75%	26,523	78.7%	296	0.9%
P199	Serian	Richard Riot Jaem (BN–SUPP)	19,494	73.5%	Johnny Aput (STAR)	390	1.5%	13,151	Richard Riot Jaem (BN–SUPP)	33,713		11%			15%	75%	26,523	78.7%	296	0.9%
P200	Batang Sadong	Nancy Shukri (BN–PBB)	13,277	85.5%	Mohamad Jolhi (PR–PAS)	2,017	13.0%	11,260	Nancy Shukri (BN–PBB)	19,839		6%			74%	21%	15,521	78.2%	227	1.1%
P201	Batang Lupar	Rohani Abdul Karim (BN–PBB)	15,625	75.4%	Abang Zulkifli Abang Engkeh (PR–PKR)	4,661	22.5%	10,964	Rohani Abdul Karim (BN–PBB)	27,360		3%			77%	20%	20,711	75.7%	425	1.6%
P202	Sri Aman	Masir Kujat (BN–PRS)	12,168	54.4%	Nicholas Mujah Ason (PR–PKR)	5,618	25.1%	6,550	Masir Kujat (BN–PRS)	29,789		17%			20%	63%	22,353	75.0%	224	0.8%
P202	Sri Aman	Masir Kujat (BN–PRS)	12,168	54.4%	Donald Lawan (IND)	3,867	17.3%	6,550	Masir Kujat (BN–PRS)	29,789		17%			20%	63%	22,353	75.0%	224	0.8%
P202	Sri Aman	Masir Kujat (BN–PRS)	12,168	54.4%	Wilfred Stephen (SWP)	476	2.1%	6,550	Masir Kujat (BN–PRS)	29,789		17%			20%	63%	22,353	75.0%	224	0.8%
P203	Lubok Antu	William Nyallau Badak (BN–PRS)	8,278	54.7%	Larry Sng Wei Shien (SWP)	4,187	27.7%	4,091	William Nyallau Badak (BN–PRS)	19,303		8%			18%	74%	15,138	78.4%	143	0.7%
P203	Lubok Antu	William Nyallau Badak (BN–PRS)	8,278	54.7%	Nicholas Bawin Anggat (PR–PKR)	2,530	16.7%	4,091	William Nyallau Badak (BN–PRS)	19,303		8%			18%	74%	15,138	78.4%	143	0.7%
P204	Betong	Douglas Uggah Embas (BN–PBB)	15,476	75.9%	Cecilia Siti Una @ Sittie Endek (PR–PKR)	4,589	22.5%	10,887	Douglas Uggah Embas (BN–PBB)	26,322		7%			50%	43%	20,380	77.4%	315	1.2%
P205	Saratok	William Mawan Ikom (BN–SPDP)	11,600	52.6%	Ali Biju (PR–PKR)	9,519	43.2%	2,081	Jelaing Mersat (BN–SPDP)	27,562		7%			44%	49%	22,058	80.0%	258	0.9%
P205	Saratok	William Mawan Ikom (BN–SPDP)	11,600	52.6%	Rosli Bin Lek @ Abg Roselie bin Abg Paleng (IND)	681	3.1%	2,081	Jelaing Mersat (BN–SPDP)	27,562		7%			44%	49%	22,058	80.0%	258	0.9%
P206	Tanjong Manis	Norah Abdul Rahman (BN–PBB)	12,535	87.4%	Jurina Mut (PR–PAS)	1,571	11.0%	10,964	Norah Abdul Rahman (BN–PBB)	19,215		5%			74%	20%	14,344	74.7%	238	1.2%
P207	Igan	Wahab Dolah (BN–PBB)	11,896	85.8%	Ajiji Fauzan (PR–PAS)	1,747	12.6%	10,149	Wahab Dolah (BN–PBB)	17,771		4%			81%	15%	13,865	78.0%	222	1.2%
P208	Sarikei	Wong Ling Biu (PR–DAP)	14,263	50.4%	Ding Kuong Hiing (BN–SUPP)	13,758	48.6%	505	Ding Kuong Hiing (BN–SUPP)	36,550		66%			11%	23%	28,298	77.4%	277	0.8%
P209	Julau	Joseph Salang Gandum (BN–PRS)	9,891	58.3%	Wong Judat (SWP)	3,936	23.2%	5,955	Joseph Salang Gandum (BN–PRS)	22,522		5%			12%	83%	16,957	75.3%	278	1.2%
P209	Julau	Joseph Salang Gandum (BN–PRS)	9,891	58.3%	Wong Hong Yu (PR–PKR)	2,852	16.8%	5,955	Joseph Salang Gandum (BN–PRS)	22,522		5%			12%	83%	16,957	75.3%	278	1.2%
P210	Kanowit	Aaron Ago Dagang (BN–PRS)	8,046	58.5%	Thomas Laja Besi (PR–PKR)	5,004	36.4%	3,042	Aaron Ago Dagang (BN–PRS)	19,433		12%			16%	72%	13,743	70.7%	276	1.4%
P210	Kanowit	Aaron Ago Dagang (BN–PRS)	8,046	58.5%	Ellison Ludan Anak Mu (SWP)	417	3.0%	3,042	Aaron Ago Dagang (BN–PRS)	19,433		12%			16%	72%	13,743	70.7%	276	1.4%
P211	Lanang	Alice Lau Kiong Yieng (PR–DAP)	26,613	59.3%	Tiong Thai King (BN–SUPP)	17,983	40.1%	8,630	Tiong Thai King (BN–SUPP)	57,143		72%			10%	18%	44,900	78.6%	304	0.5%
P212	Sibu	Oscar Ling Chai Yew (PR–DAP)	26,808	52.1%	Lau Lee Ming (BN–SUPP)	23,967	46.6%	2,841	Wong Ho Leng (PR–DAP)	64,601		65%			20%	15%	51,474	79.7%	496	0.8%
P212	Sibu	Oscar Ling Chai Yew (PR–DAP)	26,808	52.1%	Narawi Haron (IND)	203	0.4%	2,841	Wong Ho Leng (PR–DAP)	64,601		65%			20%	15%	51,474	79.7%	496	0.8%
P213	Mukah	Leo Michael Toyad (BN–PBB)	14,983	75.5%	Hai Bin Merawin @ Bonaventure (PR–DAP)	2,219	11.2%	12,764	Leo Michael Toyad (BN–PBB)	26,477		10%			75%	16%	19,838	74.9%	417	1.6%
P213	Mukah	Leo Michael Toyad (BN–PBB)	14,983	75.5%	Sylvester Ajah Subah @ Ajah Bin Subah (IND)	2,219	11.2%	12,764	Leo Michael Toyad (BN–PBB)	26,477		10%			75%	16%	19,838	74.9%	417	1.6%
P214	Selangau	Joseph Entulu Belaun (BN–PRS)	12,040	58.1%	Sng Chee Hua (SWP)	4,485	21.6%	7,555	Joseph Entulu Belaun (BN–PRS)	25,461		4%			13%	83%	20,725	81.4%	309	1.2%
P214	Selangau	Joseph Entulu Belaun (BN–PRS)	12,040	58.1%	Joshua Anak Jabing @ Joshua Jabeng (PR–PKR)	3,891	18.8%	7,555	Joseph Entulu Belaun (BN–PRS)	25,461		4%			13%	83%	20,725	81.4%	309	1.2%
P215	Kapit	Alexander Nanta Linggi (BN–PBB)	13,446	77.1%	Ramli Malaka (PR–DAP)	3,715	21.3%	9,731	Alexander Nanta Linggi (BN–PBB)	26,195		10%			22%	68%	17,432	66.5%	271	1.0%
P216	Hulu Rajang	Wilson Ugak Kumbong (BN–PRS)	9,117	61.8%	Abun Sui Anyit (PR–PKR)	3,283	22.3%	5,834	Billy Abit Joo (BN–PRS)	21,686				2%	20%	77%	14,742	68.0%	213	1.0%
P216	Hulu Rajang	Wilson Ugak Kumbong (BN–PRS)	9,117	61.8%	George Lagong (SWP)	2,129	14.4%	5,834	Billy Abit Joo (BN–PRS)	21,686				2%	20%	77%	14,742	68.0%	213	1.0%
P217	Bintulu	Tiong King Sing (BN–SPDP)	26,458	57.6%	John Brian Anthony Jeremy Guang (PR–DAP)	19,025	41.4%	7,433	Tiong King Sing (BN–SPDP)	59,893		28%			29%	44%	45,941	76.7%	458	0.8%
P218	Sibuti	Ahmad Lai Bujang (BN–PBB)	13,348	63.8%	Muhammad Zaid Tandang (PR–PAS)	7,282	34.8%	6,066	Ahmad Lai Bujang (BN–PBB)	28,351		22%			33%	44%	20,918	73.8%	288	1.0%
P219	Miri	Michael Teo Yu Keng (PR–PKR)	26,909	51.0%	Sebastian Ting Chiew Yew (BN–SUPP)	24,917	47.2%	1,992	Peter Chin Fah Kui (BN–SUPP)	71,170		57%			26%	17%	52,762	74.1%	630	0.9%
P219	Miri	Michael Teo Yu Keng (PR–PKR)	26,909	51.0%	Chong Kon Fatt (STAR)	306	0.6%	1,992	Peter Chin Fah Kui (BN–SUPP)	71,170		57%			26%	17%	52,762	74.1%	630	0.9%
P220	Baram	Anyi Ngau (BN–SPDP)	9,182	48.9%	Roland Engan (PR–PKR)	8,988	47.9%	194	Jacob Dungau Sagan (BN–SPDP)	29,385		9%			21%	70%	18,775	63.9%	242	0.8%
P220	Baram	Anyi Ngau (BN–SPDP)	9,182	48.9%	Patrick Sibat Sujang (IND)	363	1.9%	194	Jacob Dungau Sagan (BN–SPDP)	29,385		9%			21%	70%	18,775	63.9%	242	0.8%
P221	Limbang	Hasbi Habibollah (BN–PBB)	12,999	72.8%	Baru Bian (PR–PKR)	4,698	26.3%	8,301	Hasbi Habibollah (BN–PBB)	24,278		19%			45%	35%	17,859	73.6%	162	0.7%
P222	Lawas	Henry Sum Agong (BN–PBB)	9,928	70.6%	Baru Langup (PR–DAP)	3,898	27.7%	6,030	Henry Sum Agong (BN–PBB)	18,845		10%			43%	47%	14,072	74.7%	177	0.9%
P222	Lawas	Henry Sum Agong (BN–PBB)	9,928	70.6%	Alirahman Kamseh (STAR)	69	0.5%	6,030	Henry Sum Agong (BN–PBB)	18,845		10%			43%	47%	14,072	74.7%	177	0.9%
