= Frankie Gan =

Malaysian politician

Frankie Gan Joon Zin KMW
- 颜骏任

Personal details
- Born: 16 July 1966 (age 60) Malacca, Malaysia
- Party: Malaysian Chinese Association (MCA)
- Other political affiliations: Barisan Nasional (BN)
- Occupation: Politician

Chinese name
- Traditional Chinese: 顏駿任
- Simplified Chinese: 颜骏任
- Hanyu Pinyin: Yán Jùnrèn
- Hokkien POJ: Gân Chùn-jīm

Frankie Gan Joon Zin (颜骏任; born 16 July 1966) is a Malaysian politician and a member of the Malaysian Chinese Association (MCA), a major component party in the Barisan Nasional (BN) coalition. He is also a community leader in Bukit Bintang, Kuala Lumpur.

== NGO activity ==
Gan was the national treasurer for St. John Ambulance Malaysia (2001 to 2005). He is also the Secretary for the Pertubuhan Kesenian dan Warisan Masyarakat Malaysia Kuala Lumpur.

== The singing candidate ==
Gan is known for his love of singing, and was in the entertainment business when he was younger. In 2013, his video "Love Is In The Air" was widely viewed in Malaysia, and the respective political advertisement appeared on the Australian TV show Gruen Nation. The publicity from the video boosted Gan's political career, and he gained support from many Malaysian Chinese voters. In an act to woo voters, Gan began singing during his campaigns, and made an MTV Karaoke CD to be distributed to the public, including Tamil songs, Hakka songs and others. The public response was mixed.

== Election results ==
Parliament of Malaysia
Year	Constituency	Candidate	Votes	Pct	Opponent(s)	Votes	Pct	Ballots cast	Majority	Turnout
2013	P122 Bukit Bintang	Frankie Gan Joon Zin (MCA)	11,009	26.55%	Fong Kui Lun (DAP)	30,408	73.33%	41,824	19,399	75.06%

== Honours ==
Gan was awarded the Bintang Kesatria Mahkota Wilayah from Yang di-Pertuan Agong (King of Malaysia) in recognition of his community service.

- Federal Territory (Malaysia)
  - Officer of the Order of the Territorial Crown (KMW) (2009)
