= Members of the Dewan Rakyat, 13th Malaysian Parliament =

13th Parliament of Malaysia
←	12th Parliament	14th Parliament	→

Overview
- Legislative body: Parliament of Malaysia
- Jurisdiction: Malaysia
- Meeting place: Malaysian Houses of Parliament
- Term: 24 June 2013 – 7 April 2018
- Election: 2013 general election
- Government: Second Najib cabinet
- Website: www.parlimen.gov.my

Dewan Rakyat
- Members: 222
- Speaker: Pandikar Amin Mulia
- Deputy Speaker: Ronald Kiandee; Ismail Mohamed Said
- Secretary: Roosme Hamzah
- Prime Minister: Najib Razak
- Leader of the Opposition: Anwar Ibrahim (until 16 March 2015); Wan Azizah Wan Ismail
- Party control: Barisan Nasional

Sovereign
- Yang di-Pertuan Agong: Tuanku Abdul Halim Muadzam Shah (until 12 December 2016); Sultan Muhammad V

Sessions
- 1st: 24 June 2013 – 5 December 2013
- 2nd: 10 March 2014 – 27 November 2014
- 3rd: 9 March 2015 – 27 January 2016
- 4th: 7 March 2016 – 24 November 2016
- 5th: 6 March 2017 – 30 November 2017
- 6th: 5 March 2018 – 5 April 2018

This is a list of the members of the Dewan Rakyat (House of Representatives) of the 13th Parliament of Malaysia. The opposition coalition Pakatan Rakyat that contested the general elections in 2013 was dissolved after series of disagreements between two main parties, Democratic Action Party (DAP) and Pan-Malaysian Islamic Party (PAS). A new opposition coalition Pakatan Harapan was formed by the DAP, People's Justice Party (PKR) and newly formed party National Trust Party (AMANAH), consisting of ex-PAS members. Several ex-UMNO members have also formed their own party Malaysian United Indigenous Party (BERSATU) and have signed an electoral pact with Pakatan Harapan to contest the future general election and ensure straight fights against Barisan Nasional. On 20 March 2017 BERSATU officially became a member of Pakatan Harapan.

== Composition ==
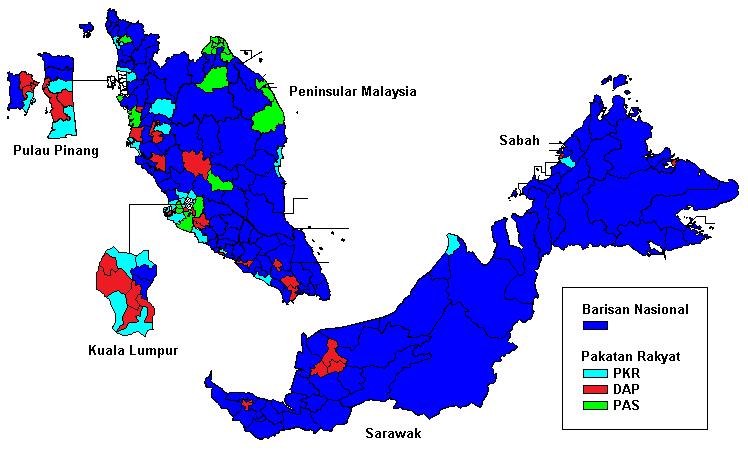
Members of Dewan Rakyat as elected in 2013 by federal constituency

Equal-area representation of members of Dewan Rakyat as elected in 2013 by federal constituency

Beginning of the 13th Parliament of Malaysia 24 June 2013
State and federal territories	# of seats	BN seats	DAP seats	PKR seats	PAS seats
Perlis	3	3	0	0	0
Kedah	15	10	0	4	1
Kelantan	14	5	0	0	9
Terengganu	8	4	0	0	4
Penang	13	3	7	3	0
Perak	24	12	7	3	2
Pahang	14	10	1	2	1
Selangor	22	5	4	9	4
Kuala Lumpur	11	2	5	4	0
Putrajaya	1	1	0	0	0
Negeri Sembilan	8	5	2	1	0
Malacca	6	4	1	1	0
Johor	26	21	4	1	0
Labuan	1	1	0	0	0
Sabah	25	22	2	1	0
Sarawak	31	25	5	1	0
Total	222	133	38	30	21

Beginning of the 13th Parliament of Malaysia 24 June 2013
State and federal territories	# of seats	BN seats	PR seats (informal)
Perlis	3	3	0
Kedah	15	10	5
Kelantan	14	5	9
Terengganu	8	4	4
Penang	13	3	10
Perak	24	12	12
Pahang	14	10	4
Selangor	22	5	17
Kuala Lumpur	11	2	9
Putrajaya	1	1	0
Negeri Sembilan	8	5	3
Malacca	6	4	2
Johor	26	21	5
Labuan	1	1	0
Sabah	25	22	3
Sarawak	31	25	6
Total	222	133	89

Equal-area representation of party changes in the Dewan Rakyat from 2013 to 2018

Dissolution of the 13th Parliament of Malaysia 7 April 2018
State and federal territories	# of seats	BN seats	PAS seats	DAP seats	PKR seats	PAN seats	WARISAN seats	PPBM seats	PSM seats	IND/OTH seats	VAC seats
Perlis	3	3	0	0	0	0	0	0	0	0	0
Kedah	15	10	0	0	4	1	0	0	0	0	0
Kelantan	14	5	7	0	1	1	0	0	0	0	0
Terengganu	8	4	3	0	0	1	0	0	0	0	0
Penang	13	3	0	7	3	0	0	0	0	0	0
Perak	24	13	1	6	2	1	0	0	1	0	0
Pahang	14	9	1	1	2	0	0	0	0	0	1
Selangor	22	5	1	4	9	3	0	0	0	0	0
Kuala Lumpur	11	2	0	5	3	0	0	0	0	1	0
Putrajaya	1	1	0	0	0	0	0	0	0	0	0
Negeri Sembilan	8	4	0	2	1	0	0	0	0	0	1
Malacca	6	4	0	0	1	0	0	0	0	1	0
Johor	26	20	0	4	1	0	0	1	0	0	0
Labuan	1	1	0	0	0	0	0	0	0	0	0
Sabah	25	21	0	2	0	0	2	0	0	0	0
Sarawak	31	25	0	5	1	0	0	0	0	0	0
Total	222	130	13	36	28	7	2	1	1	2	2

Dissolution of the 13th Parliament of Malaysia 7 April 2018
State and federal territories	# of seats	BN seats	PAS seats	PH seats (informal)	Others seats
Perlis	3	3	0	0	0
Kedah	15	10	0	5	0
Kelantan	14	5	7	2	0
Terengganu	8	4	3	1	0
Penang	13	3	0	10	0
Perak	24	13	1	9	1 List: Parti Sosialis Malaysia (1)
Pahang	14	9	1	3	1 List: Vacant seat (1)
Selangor	22	5	1	16	0
Kuala Lumpur	11	2	0	8	1 List: Independent (1)
Putrajaya	1	1	0	0	0
Negeri Sembilan	8	4	0	3	1 List: Vacant seat (1)
Malacca	6	4	0	1	1 List: Independent (1)
Johor	26	20	0	6	0
Labuan	1	1	0	0	0
Sabah	25	21	0	2	2 List: Sabah Heritage Party (2)
Sarawak	31	25	0	6	0
Total	222	130	13	72	7

== Seating arrangement ==
=== Old meeting hall in Dewan Rakyat ===
This is the seating arrangement based on the old meeting hall in previous interior, as of its last meeting on 24 November 2016 before meeting hall was moved to new meeting hall on the following year.

P009 Alor Setar	P070 Kampar	P145 Bakri	P219 Miri	P124 Bandar Tun Razak	Vacant	Vacant	Vacant	P209 Julau	P181 Tenom	P167 Kudat	Vacant	Vacant	P067 Kuala Kangsar	P093 Sungai Besar	P156 Kota Tinggi	P220 Baram	P034 Setiu	P054 Gerik
P150 Batu Pahat	P010 Kuala Kedah	P212 Sibu	P046 Batu Kawan	Vacant	Vacant	Vacant	P091 Rompin	P129 Kuala Pilah	P210 Kanowit	P011 Pendang	P126 Jelebu	P079 Lipis	P042 Tasek Gelugor	P135 Alor Gajah	P197 Kota Samarahan	P166 Labuan	P159 Pasir Gudang	P096 Kuala Selangor
	P074 Lumut	P208 Sarikei	Vacant	Vacant	P018 Kulim-Bandar Baharu	P118 Setiawangsa	P027 Tanah Merah	P204 Betong	P084 Paya Besar	P078 Cameron Highlands	P013 Sik	P141 Sekijang	P081 Jerantut	P014 Merbok	P092 Sabak Bernam	P171 Sepanggar	P002 Kangar
	P025 Bachok		P196 Stampin	Vacant	P016 Baling	P055 Lenggong	P147 Parit Sulong	P133 Tampin	P213 Mukah	P154 Mersing	P184 Libaran	P178 Sipitang	P207 Igan	P004 Langkawi	Vacant		P203 Lubok Antu
	P020 Pengkalan Chepa	P045 Bukit Mertajam		P174 Penampang	P205 Saratok	P151 Simpang Renggam	P173 Putatan	P217 Bintulu	P179 Ranau	P187 Kinabatangan	P041 Kepala Batas	P029 Machang	P202 Sri Aman	P192 Mas Gading		P001 Padang Besar	P069 Parit
	P039 Dungun	P051 Bukit Gelugor	P117 Segambut				P191 Kalabakan	P063 Tambun	P127 Jempol	P160 Johor Bahru	P134 Masjid Tanah				Deputy Minister (Vacant)	P185 Batu Sapi	P158 Tebrau
	P040 Kubang Kerian	P102 Serdang	P071 Gopeng			P165 Tanjong Piai		P032 Gua Musang	P180 Keningau	P026 Ketereh		P161 Pulai			P005 Jerlun	P218 Sibuti	P206 Tanjong Manis
	P028 Pasir Puteh	P186 Sandakan	P049 Tanjong		P019 Tumpat			E					(Senator)		P222 Lawas	P058 Bagan Serai	P221 Limbang
	P008 Pokok Sena	P138 Kota Melaka	P130 Rasah	P114 Kepong			F				D			(Senator)	P188 Silam	P216 Hulu Rajang	P139 Jasin
	P105 Petaling Jaya Selatan	P062 Sungai Siput	P083 Kuantan	P023 Rantau Panjang	P189 Semporna	G						C	P176 Kimanis	P131 Rembau	Vacant	(Senator)	P006 Kubang Pasu
	P017 Padang Serai	P104 Kelana Jaya	P052 Bayan Baru	P035 Kuala Nerus	P022 Pasir Mas	G			Sergeant-at-Arm			C	P090 Bera	(Senator)	P119 Titiwangsa	P149 Sri Gading	(Senator)
	P116 Wangsa Maju	P109 Kapar	P047 Nibong Tebal	P088 Temerloh	P059 Bukit Gantang	G						C	P040 Kemaman	P003 Arau	P095 Tanjong Karang	P155 Tenggara	P136 Tangga Batu
	P082 Indera Mahkota	P112 Kuala Langat	P101 Hulu Langat	P021 Kota Bharu	P037 Marang	G						C	P168 Kota Marudu	P033 Besut	P077 Tanjong Malim	P053 Balik Pulau	P215 Kapit
	P063 Ipoh Timor	P066 Batu Gajah	P060 Taiping	P115 Batu	P121 Lembah Pantai	H			the Mace			B	P030 Jeli	P125 Putrajaya	P157 Pengerang	P177 Beaufort	P086 Maran
	P211 Lanang	P172 Kota Kinabalu	P068 Beruas	P120 Bukit Bintang	P123 Cheras	H			the Mace			B	P153 Sembrong	P199 Serian	(Senator)	P142 Labis	P190 Tawau
	P050 Jelutong	P163 Kulai	P097 Selayang	P122 Seputeh	P143 Pagoh	H			the Mace			B	P061 Padang Rengas	P194 Petra Jaya	P007 Padang Terap	(Senator)	P038 Hulu Terengganu
	P036 Kuala Terengganu	P111 Kota Raja	P132 Telok Kemang	P064 Ipoh Barat	P098 Gombak	H			the Mace			B	P076 Telok Intan	P201 Batang Lupar	P193 Santubong	P198 Mambong	P094 Hulu Selangor
	P080 Raub	P015 Sungai Petani	P113 Sepang	P128 Seremban	P043 Bagan	I						A	P140 Segamat	P214 Selangau	P056 Larut	P164 Pontian	P144 Ledang
	P110 Klang	P100 Pandan	P108 Shah Alam	P195 Bandar Kuching	P057 Parit Buntar	I						A	P089 Bentong	(Senator)	P148 Ayer Hitam	P146 Muar	P073 Pasir Salak
	P048 Bukit Bendera	P152 Kluang	P106 Petaling Jaya Utara	P137 Bukit Katil	P162 Gelang Patah	I						A	P075 Bagan Datok (Deputy Prime Minister)	P182 Pensiangan	P200 Batang Sadong	P175 Papar	P087 Kuala Krau (Deputy Speaker)
	P031 Kuala Krai	P103 Puchong	P107 Subang	P099 Ampang	P044 Permatang Pauh (Opposition Leader)	I			Secretary			A	P085 Pekan (Prime Minister)	P012 Jerai	P169 Kota Belud	P072 Tapah	P183 Beluran (Deputy Speaker)
									Speaker
									Yang Di-Pertuan Agong

=== New meeting hall in Dewan Rakyat ===
This is the seating arrangement based on the new meeting hall in current interior as of its last meeting on 5 April 2018. In addition, there were two seats that is labelled as VACANT, namely Jelebu and Paya Besar. Both of this seats vacancy is due to the death of the incumbent Member of Parliament (MP) for both of this constituency, which happened on 6 December 2017 (Jelebu) and 12 February 2018 (Paya Besar) respectively.

Vacant	Vacant		Vacant	Vacant	Vacant	Vacant	Vacant	Vacant	Vacant	Vacant	Vacant	Vacant	Vacant	Vacant	Vacant		P206 Tanjong Manis	P067 Kuala Kangsar
Vacant	P138 Kota Melaka	P124 Bandar Tun Razak		P018 Kulim – Bandar Baharu	P118 Setiawangsa	P027 Tanah Merah	P166 Labuan	P042 Tasek Gelugor	P091 Rompin	P069 Parit	P054 Gerik	P034 Setiu	P220 Baram	P156 Kota Tinggi		P203 Lubok Antu	P002 Kangar	P093 Sungai Besar
	P008 Pokok Sena																P171 Sepanggar
	Vacant	P010 Kuala Kedah	P212 Sibu	P147 Parit Sulong	P055 Lenggong	P016 Baling	P221 Limbang	P181 Tenom	P084 Paya Besar (Vacant)	P167 Kudat	P210 Kanowit	P096 Kuala Selangor	P135 Alor Gajah	P197 Kota Samarahan	P185 Batu Sapi	P158 Tebrau	Vacant
	P219 Miri	P150 Batu Pahat														P079 Lipis	P092 Sabak Bernam
Vacant	P145 Bakri	P208 Sarikei	P046 Batu Kawan		P205 Saratok	P204 Betong	P216 Hulu Rajang	P151 Simpang Renggam	P154 Mersing	P209 Julau	P078 Cameron Highlands	P139 Jasin	P159 Pasir Gudang		P222 Lawas	P126 Jelebu (Vacant)	P081 Jerantut	Vacant
Vacant	P070 Kampar	P074 Lumut	P102 Serdang												P005 Jerlun	P058 Bagan Serai	P141 Sekijang	Vacant
Vacant	P009 Alor Setar	P196 Stampin	P050 Jelutong	P174 Penampang		P173 Putatan	P165 Tanjong Piai	P133 Tampin	P179 Ranau	P187 Kinabatangan	P011 Pendang	P217 Bintulu		P134 Masjid Tanah	(Senator)	P218 Sibuti	P013 Sik	Vacant
Vacant	Vacant	P045 Bukit Mertajam	P051 Bukit Gelugor	P116 Wangsa Maju										P006 Kubang Pasu	P192 Mas Gading	P001 Padang Besar	Vacant	Vacant
Vacant		P025 Bachok	P117 Segambut	P082 Indera Mahkota										Deputy Minister (Vacant)	P212 Sri Aman	P004 Langkawi		Vacant
		P020 Pengkalan Chepa	P071 Gopeng	P109 Kapar	P023 Rantau Panjang		P191 Kalabakan	P063 Tambun	P127 Jempol	P213 Mukah	P129 Kuala Pilah		P190 Tawau	P136 Tangga Batu	P029 Machang	P207 Igan
	Vacant	P039 Dungun	P049 Tanjong	P104 Kelana Jaya	P035 Kuala Nerus		P032 Gua Musang	P180 Keningau	P026 Ketereh	P160 Johor Bahru			P053 Balik Pulau	P215 Kapit	P041 Kepala Batas	P178 Sipitang	P014 Merbok
	Vacant	P024 Kubang Kerian	P130 Rasah	P019 Tumpat	P088 Temerloh	P189 Semporna	E		D		C	P177 Beaufort	P086 Maran	(Senator)	(Senator)	P184 Libaran	Vacant
	Vacant	P028 Pasir Puteh	P105 Petaling Jaya Selatan	P114 Kepong	P022 Pasir Mas	P059 Bukit Gantang	E		Sergeant-at-Arm		C	P142 Labis	P038 Hulu Terengganu	P149 Sri Gading	(Senator)	Vacant	Vacant
	Vacant	Vacant	P017 Padang Serai	P101 Hulu Langat	P021 Kota Bharu	P037 Marang	E				C	(Senator)	P094 Hulu Selangor	P155 Tenggara	P161 Pulai	P198 Silam	Vacant
		P111 Kota Raja	P211 Lanang	P163 Kulai	P122 Seputeh	P121 Lembah Pantai	F		the Mace		B	P168 Kota Marudu	P194 Petra Jaya	P148 Ayer Hitam	Vacant	P198 Mambong
		P083 Kuantan	P062 Ipoh Timor	P064 Batu Gajah	P186 Sandakan	P063 Ipoh Barat	F		the Mace		B	P030 Jeli	P201 Batang Lupar	P200 Batang Sadong	P119 Titiwangsa	P144 Ledang
	Vacant	P062 Sungai Siput	P047 Nibong Tebal	P068 Beruas	P097 Selayang	P123 Cheras	F		the Mace		B	P153 Sembrong	P214 Selangau	P169 Kota Belud	P095 Tanjong Karang	P073 Pasir Salak	Vacant
	Vacant	P052 Bayan Baru	P172 Kota Kinabalu	P060 Taiping	P115 Batu	P143 Pagoh	F		the Mace		B	P061 Padang Rengas	P170 Tuaran	P131 Rembau	P077 Tanjong Malim	P164 Pontian	Vacant
	Vacant	P112 Kuala Langat	P038 Kuala Terengganu	P132 Telok Kemang	P120 Bukit Bintang	P098 Gombak	G				A	P076 Telok Intan	P182 Pensiangan	(Senator)	P007 Padang Terap	P146 Muar	Vacant
	Vacant	P080 Raub	P152 Kluang	P106 Petaling Jaya Utara	P126 Seremban	P043 Bagan	G				A	P140 Segamat	P012 Jerai	P193 Santubong	P003 Arau	P175 Papar	Vacant
	Vacant	P110 Klang	P100 Pandan	P107 Subang	P195 Bandar Kuching	P057 Parit Buntar	G				A	P090 Bentong	P176 Kimanis	P033 Besut	P056 Larut	P072 Tapah	Vacant
		P048 Bukit Bendera	P016 Sungai Petani	P108 Shah Alam	P137 Bukit Katil	P162 Gelang Patah	G				A	P075 Bagan Datok (Deputy Prime Minister)	P090 Bera	P125 Putrajaya	(Senator)	P087 Kuala Krau (Deputy Speaker)
		P031 Kuala Krai	P103 Puchong	P113 Sepang	P099 Ampang	P044 Permatang Pauh (Opposition Leader)	G		Secretary		A	P085 Pekan (Prime Minister)	P040 Kemaman	P199 Serian	P157 Pengerang	P183 Beluran (Deputy Speaker)
									Speaker
									Yang Di-Pertuan Agong

== Elected members by state ==
Shortcut:

Perlis | Kedah | Kelantan | Terengganu | Pulau Pinang | Perak | Pahang | Selangor | Kuala Lumpur | Putrajaya | Negeri Sembilan | Melaka | Johor | Labuan | Sabah | Sarawak

Unless noted otherwise, the MPs served the entire term of the parliament (from 24 June 2013 to 7 April 2018).

=== Perlis ===
No.	Federal Constituency	Member	Party
BN 3
P001	Padang Besar	Zahidi Zainul Abidin	BN (UMNO)
P002	Kangar	Shaharuddin Ismail	BN (UMNO)
P003	Arau	Shahidan Kassim	BN (UMNO)

=== Kedah ===
No.	Federal Constituency	Member	Party
BN 10 | PKR 4 | PAN 1
P004	Langkawi	Nawawi Ahmad	BN (UMNO)
P005	Jerlun	Othman Aziz	BN (UMNO)
P006	Kubang Pasu	Mohd Johari Baharum	BN (UMNO)
P007	Padang Terap	Mahdzir Khalid	BN (UMNO)
P008	Pokok Sena	Mahfuz Omar (Note: Mahfuz Omar was elected as a PAS assemblymen in the general elections, quit his PAS membership and joined PAN.)	PH (AMANAH)
P009	Alor Star	Gooi Hsiao-Leung	PH (PKR)
P010	Kuala Kedah	Azman Ismail	PH (PKR)
P011	Pendang	Othman Abdul	BN (UMNO)
P012	Jerai	Jamil Khir Baharom	BN (UMNO)
P013	Sik	Mansor Abd Rahman	BN (UMNO)
P014	Merbok	Ismail Daut	BN (UMNO)
P015	Sungai Petani	Johari Abdul	PH (PKR)
P016	Baling	Abdul Azeez Abdul Rahim	BN (UMNO)
P017	Padang Serai	Surendran Nagarajan	PH (PKR)
P018	Kulim-Bandar Baharu	Abd. Aziz Sheikh Fadzir	BN (UMNO)

=== Kelantan ===
No.	Federal Constituency	Member	Party
PAS 7 | BN 5 | PKR 1 | PAN 1
P019	Tumpat	Kamarudin Jaffar (Note: Kamarudin Jaffar was elected as a Pakatan Rakyat MP in the general elections, resigned from PAS and joined PKR.)	PH (PKR)
P020	Pengkalan Chepa	Izani Husin	PAS
P021	Kota Bharu	Takiyuddin Hassan	PAS
P022	Pasir Mas	Nik Mohamad Abduh Nik Abdul Aziz	PAS
P023	Rantau Panjang	Siti Zailah Mohd Yusoff	PAS
P024	Kubang Kerian	Ahmad Baihaki Atiqullah	PAS
P025	Bachok	Ahmad Marzuk Shaary	PAS
P026	Ketereh	Annuar Musa	BN (UMNO)
P027	Tanah Merah	Ikmal Hisham Abdul Aziz	BN (UMNO)
P028	Pasir Puteh	Nik Mazian Nik Mohamad	PAS
P029	Machang	Ahmad Jazlan Yaakub	BN (UMNO)
P030	Jeli	Mustapa Mohamed	BN (UMNO)
P031	Kuala Krai	Mohd Hatta Ramli (Note: Mohd Hatta Ramli was elected as a PAS assemblymen in the general elections, quit his PAS membership and joined PAN.)	PH (AMANAH)
P032	Gua Musang	Tengku Razaleigh Hamzah	BN (UMNO)

=== Terengganu ===
No.	Federal Constituency	Member	Party
BN 4 | PAS 3 | PAN 1
P033	Besut	Idris Jusoh	BN (UMNO)
P034	Setiu	Che Mohamad Zulkifly Jusoh	BN (UMNO)
P035	Kuala Nerus	Mohd Khairuddin Aman Razali at-Takiri	PAS
P036	Kuala Terengganu	Raja Kamarul Bahrin Shah Raja Ahmad (Note: Raja Kamarul Bahrin Shah was elected as a PAS assemblymen in the general elections, quit his PAS membership and joined PAN.)	PH (AMANAH)
P037	Marang	Abdul Hadi Awang	PAS
P038	Hulu Terengganu	Jailani Johari	BN (UMNO)
P039	Dungun	Wan Hassan Mohd Ramli	PAS
P040	Kemaman	Ahmad Shabery Cheek	BN (UMNO)

=== Penang ===
No.	Federal Constituency	Member	Party
DAP 7 | BN 3 | PKR 3
P041	Kepala Batas	Reezal Merican Naina Merican	BN (UMNO)
P042	Tasek Gelugor	Shabudin Yahaya	BN (UMNO)
P043	Bagan	Lim Guan Eng	PH (DAP)
P044	Permatang Pauh	Wan Azizah Wan Ismail from 7 May 2015 (Note: Wan Azizah Wan Ismail was elected as a Pakatan Rakyat member of parliament in a by-election following the disqualification of MP Anwar Ibrahim due to his sodomy conviction.)	PH (PKR)
P044	Permatang Pauh	Anwar Ibrahim until 16 March 2015	PR (PKR)
P045	Bukit Mertajam	Steven Sim Chee Keong	PH (DAP)
P046	Batu Kawan	Kasthuriraani Patto	PH (DAP)
P047	Nibong Tebal	Mansor Othman	PH (PKR)
P048	Bukit Bendera	Zairil Khir Johari	PH (DAP)
P049	Tanjong	Ng Wei Aik	PH (DAP)
P050	Jelutong	Jeff Ooi Chuan Aun	PH (DAP)
P051	Bukit Gelugor	Ramkarpal Singh from 25 May 2014 (Note: Ramkarpal Singh was elected as a Pakatan Rakyat member of parliament on 25 May 2014 in a by-election following the death of MP Karpal Singh.)	PH (DAP)
P051	Bukit Gelugor	Karpal Singh until 17 April 2014	PR (DAP)
P052	Bayan Baru	Sim Tze Tzin	PH (PKR)
P053	Balik Pulau	Hilmi Yahaya	BN (UMNO)

=== Perak ===
No.	Federal Constituency	Member	Party
BN 13 | DAP 6 | PKR 2 | PAS 1 | PAN 1 | PSM 1
P054	Gerik	Hasbullah Osman	BN (UMNO)
P055	Lenggong	Shamsul Anuar Nasarah	BN (UMNO)
P056	Larut	Hamzah Zainudin	BN (UMNO)
P057	Parit Buntar	Mujahid Yusof Rawa (Note: Mujahid Yusof Rawa was elected as a PAS assemblymen in the general elections, quit his PAS membership and joined PAN.)	PH (AMANAH)
P058	Bagan Serai	Noor Azmi Ghazali	BN (UMNO)
P059	Bukit Gantang	Idris Ahmad	PAS
P060	Taiping	Nga Kor Ming	PH (DAP)
P061	Padang Rengas	Mohamed Nazri Abdul Aziz	BN (UMNO)
P062	Sungai Siput	Michael Jeyakumar Devaraj (Note: Jeyakumar is a member of the Socialist Party of Malaysia (PSM) but was elected to Parliament on the ticket of the People's Justice Party in the Pakatan Rakyat opposition coalition.)	PSM
P063	Tambun	Ahmad Husni Hanadzlah	BN (UMNO)
P064	Ipoh Timor	Su Keong Siong	PH (DAP)
P065	Ipoh Barat	M. Kulasegaran	PH (DAP)
P066	Batu Gajah	Sivakumar Varatharaju Naidu	PH (DAP)
P067	Kuala Kangsar	Mastura Mohd Yazid from 18 June 2016 (Note: Elected in a by-election following the death of assemblyman Wan Mohammad Khair-il Anuar Wan Ahmad.)	BN (UMNO)
P067	Kuala Kangsar	Wan Mohammad Khair-il Anuar Wan Ahmad until 5 May 2016	BN (UMNO)
P068	Beruas	Ngeh Koo Ham	PH (DAP)
P069	Parit	Mohd Zaim Abu Hassan	BN (UMNO)
P070	Kampar	Ko Chung Sen	PH (DAP)
P071	Gopeng	Lee Boon Chye	PH (PKR)
P072	Tapah	Saravanan Murugan	BN (MIC)
P073	Pasir Salak	Tajuddin Abdul Rahman	BN (UMNO)
P074	Lumut	Mohamad Imran Abdul Hamid	PH (PKR)
P075	Bagan Datok	Ahmad Zahid Hamidi	BN (UMNO)
P076	Telok Intan	Mah Siew Keong from 31 May 2014 (Note: Mah Siew Keong was elected as a Barisan Nasional assemblymen on 31 May 2014 in a by-election following the death of assemblyman Seah Leong Peng.)	BN (Gerakan)
P076	Telok Intan	Seah Leong Peng until 1 May 2014	PR (DAP)
P077	Tanjong Malim	Ong Ka Chuan	BN (MCA)

=== Pahang ===
No.	Federal Constituency	Member	Party
BN 8 | PKR 2 | DAP 1 | PAS 1 | IND 1 | VAC 1
P078	Cameron Highlands	Palanivel Govindasamy (Note: Palanivel Govindasamy was elected as a Barisan Nasional MP in the general elections in 2013, had lost MIC membership on 25 June 2015 after being disqualified by the party.)	IND
P079	Lipis	Abdul Rahman Mohamad	BN (UMNO)
P080	Raub	Mohd Ariff Sabri Abd Aziz	PH (DAP)
P081	Jerantut	Ahmad Nazlan Idris	BN (UMNO)
P082	Indera Mahkota	Fauzi Abdul Rahman	PH (PKR)
P083	Kuantan	Fuziah Salleh	PH (PKR)
P084	Paya Besar	Vacant since 12 February 2018 (Note: Abdul Manan Ismail was elected as a Barisan Nasional MP in the general elections in 2013, died from an accident on February 13, 2018 but his death did not necessitate a by-election.)	VAC
P084	Paya Besar	Abdul Manan Ismail until 12 February 2018	BN (UMNO)
P085	Pekan	Najib Razak	BN (UMNO)
P086	Maran	Ismail Muttalib	BN (UMNO)
P087	Kuala Krau	Ismail Mohamed Said (Deputy Speaker)	BN (UMNO)
P088	Temerloh	Nasrudin Hassan	PAS
P089	Bentong	Liow Tiong Lai	BN (MCA)
P090	Bera	Ismail Sabri Yaakob	BN (UMNO)
P091	Rompin	Hasan Arifin from 5 May 2015 (Note: Hasan Arifin was elected as a Barisan Nasional assemblymen on 5 May 2015 in a by-election following the death of assemblyman Jamaluddin Jarjis.)	BN (UMNO)
P091	Rompin	Jamaluddin Jarjis until 4 April 2015	BN (UMNO)

=== Selangor ===
No.	Federal Constituency	Member	Party
PKR 9 | BN 5 | DAP 4 | PAN 3 | PAS 1
P092	Sabak Bernam	Mohd Fasiah Mohd Fakeh	BN (UMNO)
P093	Sungai Besar	Budiman Mohd Zohdi from 18 June 2016 (Note: Budiman Mohd Zohdi was elected as a Barisan Nasional assemblymen on 18 June 2016 in a by-election following the death of assemblyman Noriah Kasnon.)	BN (UMNO)
P093	Sungai Besar	Noriah Kasnon until 5 May 2016	BN (UMNO)
P094	Hulu Selangor	Kamalanathan Panchanathan	BN (MIC)
P095	Tanjong Karang	Noh Omar	BN (UMNO)
P096	Kuala Selangor	Irmohizam Ibrahim	BN (UMNO)
P097	Selayang	William Leong Jee Keen	PH (PKR)
P098	Gombak	Mohamed Azmin Ali	PH (PKR)
P099	Ampang	Zuraida Kamarudin	PH (PKR)
P100	Pandan	Rafizi Ramli	PH (PKR)
P101	Hulu Langat	Che Rosli Che Mat	PAS
P102	Serdang	Ong Kian Ming	PH (DAP)
P103	Puchong	Gobind Singh Deo	PH (DAP)
P104	Kelana Jaya	Wong Chen	PH (PKR)
P105	Petaling Jaya Selatan	Hee Loy Sian	PH (PKR)
P106	Petaling Jaya Utara	Tony Pua Kiam Wee	PH (DAP)
P107	Subang	Sivarasa K. Rasiah	PH (PKR)
P108	Shah Alam	Khalid Abdul Samad (Note: Khalid Abdul Samad was elected as a PAS assemblymen in the general elections, quit his PAS membership and joined PAN.)	PH (AMANAH)
P109	Kapar	Manivannan Gowindasamy	PH (PKR)
P110	Klang	Charles Anthony R. Santiago	PH (DAP)
P111	Kota Raja	Siti Mariah Mahmud (Note: Siti Mariah Mahmud was elected as a PAS assemblymen in the general elections, quit his PAS membership and joined PAN.)	PH (AMANAH)
P112	Kuala Langat	Abdullah Sani Abdul Hamid	PH (PKR)
P113	Sepang	Mohamed Hanipa Maidin (Note: Mohamed Hanipa Maidin was elected as a PAS assemblymen in the general elections, quit his PAS membership and joined PAN.)	PH (AMANAH)

=== Federal Territory of Kuala Lumpur ===
No.	Federal Constituency	Member	Party
DAP 5 | PKR 3 | BN 2 | IND 1
P114	Kepong	Tan Seng Giaw	PH (DAP)
P115	Batu	Chua Tian Chang	PH (PKR)
P116	Wangsa Maju	Tan Kee Kwong	PH (PKR)
P117	Segambut	Lim Lip Eng	PH (DAP)
P118	Setiawangsa	Ahmad Fauzi Zahari	BN (UMNO)
P119	Titiwangsa	Johari Abdul Ghani	BN (UMNO)
P120	Bukit Bintang	Fong Kui Lun	PH (DAP)
P121	Lembah Pantai	Nurul Izzah Anwar	PH (PKR)
P122	Seputeh	Teresa Kok Suh Sim	PH (DAP)
P123	Cheras	Tan Kok Wai	PH (DAP)
P124	Bandar Tun Razak	Abdul Khalid Ibrahim (Note: Abdul Khalid Ibrahim was elected as a PR MP in the general elections in 2013, sacked from his PKR membership on 9 August 2014.)	IND

=== Federal Territory of Putrajaya ===
No.	Federal Constituency	Member	Party
BN 1
P125	Putrajaya	Tengku Adnan Tengku Mansor	BN (UMNO)

=== Negeri Sembilan ===
No.	Federal Constituency	Member	Party
BN 4 | DAP 2 | PKR 1 | VAC 1
P126	Jelebu	Vacant since 6 December 2017 (Note: Zainudin Ismail was elected as a Barisan Nasional MP in the general elections in 2013, died from a brain tumour on December 6, 2017, but his death did not necessitate a by-election.)	VAC
P126	Jelebu	Zainuddin Ismail until 6 December 2017	BN (UMNO)
P127	Jempol	Mohd Isa Abdul Samad	BN (UMNO)
P128	Seremban	Loke Siew Fook	PH (DAP)
P129	Kuala Pilah	Hasan Malek	BN (UMNO)
P130	Rasah	Teo Kok Seong	PH (DAP)
P131	Rembau	Khairy Jamaluddin Abu Bakar	BN (UMNO)
P132	Telok Kemang	Kamarul Baharin Abbas	PH (PKR)
P133	Tampin	Shaziman Abu Mansor	BN (UMNO)

=== Malacca ===
No.	Federal Constituency	Member	Party
BN 4 | PKR 1 | IND 1
P134	Masjid Tanah	Mas Ermieyati Samsudin	BN (UMNO)
P135	Alor Gajah	Koh Nai Kwong	BN (MCA)
P136	Tangga Batu	Abu Bakar Mohamad Diah	BN (UMNO)
P137	Bukit Katil	Shamsul Iskandar Mohd Akin	PH (PKR)
P138	Kota Melaka	Sim Tong Him (Note: Sim Tong Him was elected as a PR assemblymen in the general elections in 2013, quit his DAP membership on 12 February 2017 and became an independent.)	IND
P139	Jasin	Ahmad Hamzah	BN (UMNO)

=== Johor ===
No.	Federal Constituency	Member	Party
BN 20 | DAP 4 | PKR 1 | PPBM 1
P140	Segamat	Subramaniam Sathasivam	BN (MIC)
P141	Sekijang	Anuar Abdul Manap	BN (UMNO)
P142	Labis	Chua Tee Yong	BN (MCA)
P143	Pagoh	Muhyiddin Yassin (Note: Muhyiddin Yassin was elected as a BN MP in the general elections in 2013 and sacked from his UMNO membership on 24 June 2016, later joining newly formed PPBM)	PH (BERSATU)
P144	Ledang	Hamim Samuri	BN (UMNO)
P145	Bakri	Er Teck Hwa	PH (DAP)
P146	Muar	Razali Ibrahim	BN (UMNO)
P147	Parit Sulong	Noraini Ahmad	BN (UMNO)
P148	Ayer Hitam	Wee Ka Siong	BN (MCA)
P149	Sri Gading	Aziz Kaprawi	BN (UMNO)
P150	Batu Pahat	Mohd Idris Jusi	PH (PKR)
P151	Simpang Renggam	Liang Teck Meng	BN (Gerakan)
P152	Kluang	Liew Chin Tong	PH (DAP)
P153	Sembrong	Hishammuddin Hussein	BN (UMNO)
P154	Mersing	Abdul Latiff Ahmad	BN (UMNO)
P155	Tenggara	Halimah Mohd Sadique	BN (UMNO)
P156	Kota Tinggi	Noor Ehsanuddin Mohd Harun Narrashid	BN (UMNO)
P157	Pengerang	Azalina Othman Said	BN (UMNO)
P158	Tebrau	Khoo Soo Seang	BN (MCA)
P159	Pasir Gudang	Normala Abdul Samad	BN (UMNO)
P160	Johor Bahru	Shahrir Abdul Samad	BN (UMNO)
P161	Pulai	Nur Jazlan Mohamed	BN (UMNO)
P162	Gelang Patah	Lim Kit Siang	PH (DAP)
P163	Kulai	Teo Nie Ching	PH (DAP)
P164	Pontian	Ahmad Maslan	BN (UMNO)
P165	Tanjong Piai	Wee Jeck Seng	BN (MCA)

=== Federal Territory of Labuan ===
No.	Federal Constituency	Member	Party
BN 1
P166	Labuan	Rozman Isli	BN (UMNO)

=== Sabah ===
No.	Federal Constituency	Member	Party
BN 21 | DAP 2 | WARISAN 2
P167	Kudat	Abdul Rahim Bakri	BN (UMNO)
P168	Kota Marudu	Maximus Johnity Ongkili	BN (PBS)
P169	Kota Belud	Abdul Rahman Dahlan	BN (UMNO)
P170	Tuaran	Wilfred Madius Tangau	BN (UPKO)
P171	Sepanggar	Jumat Idris	BN (UMNO)
P172	Kota Kinabalu	Jimmy Wong Sze Phin	PH (DAP)
P173	Putatan	Marcus Mojigoh	BN (UPKO)
P174	Penampang	Ignatius Dorrel Leiking (Note: Ignatius Dorrel Leiking was elected as a PR MP in the general elections in 2013, resigned from PKR membership on 22 September 2016 and became an independent, after which he joined a new Sabah-based party, Sabah Heritage Party.)	WARISAN
P175	Papar	Rosnah Abdul Rashid Shirlin	BN (UMNO)
P176	Kimanis	Anifah Aman	BN (UMNO)
P177	Beaufort	Azizah Mohd Dun	BN (UMNO)
P178	Sipitang	Sapawi Ahmad	BN (UMNO)
P179	Ranau	Ewon Ebin	BN (UPKO)
P180	Keningau	Joseph Pairin Kitingan	BN (PBS)
P181	Tenom	Raime Unggi	BN (UMNO)
P182	Pensiangan	Joseph Kurup	BN (PBRS)
P183	Beluran	Ronald Kiandee (Deputy Speaker)	BN (UMNO)
P184	Libaran	Juslie Ajirol	BN (UMNO)
P185	Batu Sapi	Linda Tsen Thau Lin	BN (PBS)
P186	Sandakan	Wong Tien Fatt	PH (DAP)
P187	Kinabatangan	Bung Moktar Radin	BN (UMNO)
P188	Silam	Nasrun Mansur	BN (UMNO)
P189	Semporna	Mohd Shafie Apdal (Note: Mohd Shafie Apdal was elected as a BN MP in the general elections in 2013, resigned from UMNO membership on 4 July 2016 and became an independent, after which he joined a new Sabah-based party, Sabah Heritage Party.)	WARISAN
P190	Tawau	Mary Yap Kain Ching	BN (PBS)
P191	Kalabakan	Abdul Ghapur Salleh	BN (UMNO)

=== Sarawak ===
No.	Federal Constituency	Member	Party
BN 23 | DAP 5 | PKR 1 | IND 2
P192	Mas Gading	Nogeh Gumbek	BN (PDP)
P193	Santubong	Wan Junaidi Tuanku Jaafar	BN (PBB)
P194	Petra Jaya	Fadillah Yusof	BN (PBB)
P195	Bandar Kuching	Chong Chieng Jen	PH (DAP)
P196	Stampin	Julian Tan Kok Ping	PH (DAP)
P197	Kota Samarahan	Rubiah Wang	BN (PBB)
P198	Mambong	James Dawos Mamit	BN (PBB)
P199	Serian	Richard Riot Jaem	BN (SUPP)
P200	Batang Sadong	Nancy Shukri	BN (PBB)
P201	Batang Lupar	Rohani Abdul Karim	BN (PBB)
P202	Sri Aman	Masir Kujat	BN (PRS)
P203	Lubok Antu	William Nyallau Badak (Note: William Nyallau Badak was elected as a BN MP in the general elections in 2013, was sacked by his party PRS on 22 April 2018 and became an independent.)	IND
P204	Betong	Douglas Uggah Embas	BN (PBB)
P205	Saratok	William Mawan Ikom (Note: William Mawan Ikom who was elected as a BN MP in the general elections in 2013, resigned from his SPDP membership on 15 May 2014 and joined Teras, an independent party friendly to Barisan Nasional.)	BN (PBB)
P206	Tanjong Manis	Norah Abdul Rahman	BN (PBB)
P207	Igan	Wahab Dolah	BN (PBB)
P208	Sarikei	Wong Ling Biu	PH (DAP)
P209	Julau	Joseph Salang Gandum	BN (PRS)
P210	Kanowit	Aaron Ago Dagang	BN (PRS)
P211	Lanang	Alice Lau Kiong Yieng	PH (DAP)
P212	Sibu	Oscar Ling Chai Yew	PH (DAP)
P213	Mukah	Leo Michael Toyad	BN (PBB)
P214	Selangau	Joseph Entulu Belaun (Note: Joseph Entulu Belaun was elected as a BN MP in the general elections in 2013, was sacked by his party PRS on 22 April 2018 and became an independent.)	IND
P215	Kapit	Alexander Nanta Linggi	BN (PBB)
P216	Hulu Rajang	Wilson Ugak Kumbong	BN (PRS)
P217	Bintulu	Tiong King Sing	BN (PDP)
P218	Sibuti	Ahmad Lai Bujang	BN (PBB)
P219	Miri	Michael Teo Yu Keng	PH (PKR)
P220	Baram	Anyi Ngau	BN (PDP)
P221	Limbang	Hasbi Habibollah	BN (PBB)
P222	Lawas	Henry Sum Agong	BN (PBB)
