= Suhaili Abdul Rahman =

Malaysian politician

Yang Berhormat Dato' Indera Suhaili Abdul Rahman SIMP DIMP PGDK ASDK JP MP
- سهيلي عبد الرحمن

Member of the Malaysian Parliament for Labuan
- Incumbent
- Assumed office 19 November 2022
- Preceded by: Rozman Isli (BN–UMNO)
- Majority: 708 (2022)
- In office 29 November 1999 – 8 March 2008
- Preceded by: Abdul Mulok Awang Damit (BN–UMNO)
- Succeeded by: Yussof Mahal (BN–UMNO)
- Majority: 6,515 (1999); 7,901 (2004)

Member of the Supreme Leadership Council of the Malaysian United Indigenous Party
- In office 23 August 2020 – 7 November 2023
- President: Muhyiddin Yassin

Faction represented in Dewan Rakyat
- 1999–2008: Barisan Nasional
- 2022–2024: Perikatan Nasional
- 2024–: Independent

Personal details
- Born: Kampung Ganggarak, Labuan, Crown Colony of North Borneo (now Malaysia)
- Party: United Malays National Organisation (UMNO) (1982−2010) Malaysian United Indigenous Party (BERSATU) (2018−2024); Independent (2024-current)
- Other political affiliations: Barisan Nasional (BN) (1982−2010); Pakatan Harapan (PH) (2018–2020); Perikatan Nasional (PN) (2020−2023)
- Spouses: Datin Indera Fatimah Wanchi (died 28 October 2008); Datin Indera Suraya Hamdi
- Children: 6
- Occupation: Politician

Suhaili bin Abdul Rahman is a Malaysian politician who has served as the Member of Parliament (MP) for Labuan from November 1999 to March 2008 and again since November 2022. He was one of the founding-members of BERSATU Sabah, and also was a Former Member of the Supreme Council, Chairman of Federal Territories, Division Chief of Labuan of the Malaysian United Indigenous Party (BERSATU), a component party of the Perikatan Nasional (PN) and formerly Pakatan Harapan (PH) coalitions and was a member and Division Chief of Labuan of the United Malays National Organisation (UMNO), a component party of the Barisan Nasional (BN) coalition. Currently, he is an independent politician since his BERSATU membership ended on 12 June 2024.

== Political career ==
=== Support for Prime Minister Anwar Ibrahim and Chief Minister of Sabah Hajiji Noor ===
On 30 October 2023, SuhaIli, the Labuan MP of the PN opposition coalition, declared his support for the government and leadership of Prime Minister Anwar Ibrahim. His support for Anwar and his government strengthened the two-thirds majority support in the Dewan Rakyat they commanded by increasing the MPs supporting his government from 148 to 149. He is the second opposition MP to do so after Kuala Kangsar MP Iskandar Dzulkarnain Abdul Khalid. In addition to Anwar, Suhaili did so for Chief Minister of Sabah Hajiji Noor. He added that the declaration was decided to take the hardships and grievances of the Labuan people into consideration who were burdened by rising costs of living as well as persistent water and power disruptions while stressing his loyalty to his party BERSATU and his readiness for any possible disciplinary actions from his party. Suhaili clarified that his decision was also totally voluntary, free from external pressure and driven by a sincere desire to benefit the Labuan people.

== Election results ==
Parliament of Malaysia
Year	Constituency	Candidate	Votes	Pct	Opponent(s)	Votes	Pct	Ballots cast	Majority	Turnout
1999	P145 Labuan	Suhaili Abdul Rahman (UMNO)	8,687	71.34%	Teo Boon Heng (PBS)	2,172	17.84%	14,159	6,515	65.51%
1999	P145 Labuan	Suhaili Abdul Rahman (UMNO)	8,687	71.34%	Asbullah Mohd. Salleh (PAS)	1,318	10.82%	14,159	6,515	65.51%
2004	P166 Labuan	Suhaili Abdul Rahman (UMNO)	11,087	77.68%	Matusin Abdul Rahman (PAS)	3,186	22.32%	14,761	7,901	67.08%
2022	P166 Labuan	Suhaili Abdul Rahman (BERSATU)	8,124	28.56%	Bashir Alias (UMNO)	7,416	26.07%	28,762	708	63.95%
2022	P166 Labuan	Suhaili Abdul Rahman (BERSATU)	8,124	28.56%	Rozman Isli (WARISAN)	7,310	25.70%	28,762	708	63.95%
2022	P166 Labuan	Suhaili Abdul Rahman (BERSATU)	8,124	28.56%	Ramli Tahir (AMANAH)	5,307	18.65%	28,762	708	63.95%
2022	P166 Labuan	Suhaili Abdul Rahman (BERSATU)	8,124	28.56%	Dayang Rusimah (PBM)	202	0.71%	28,762	708	63.95%
2022	P166 Labuan	Suhaili Abdul Rahman (BERSATU)	8,124	28.56%	Ramle Mat Daly (PEJUANG)	90	0.32%	28,762	708	63.95%

== Honours ==
=== Honours of Malaysia ===
- Malaysia
  - Recipient of the 17th Yang di-Pertuan Agong Installation Medal (2024)
- Malacca
  - Justice of the Peace (JP) (2000)
- Pahang
  - Knight Grand Companion of the Order of the Crown of Pahang (SIMP) – formerly Dato', now Dato' Indera (2001)
  - Knight Companion of the Order of the Crown of Pahang (DIMP) – Dato' (1998)
- Sabah
  - Commander of the Order of Kinabalu (PGDK) – Datuk (2025)
  - Companion of the Order of Kinabalu (ASDK)
