= Mastura Mohd Yazid =

Malaysian politician

Yang Berbahagia Datuk Mastura Mohd Yazid PMW
- مستورة محمد يزيد
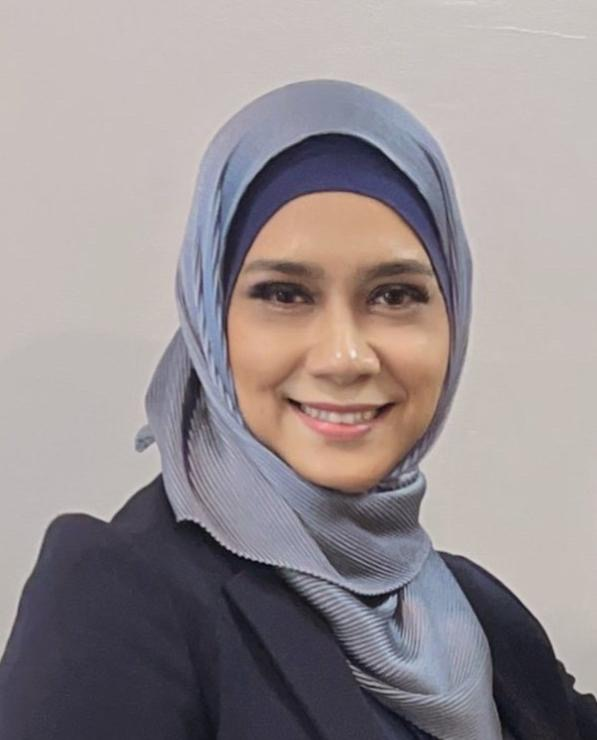

Deputy Minister in the Prime Minister's Department (Special Functions)
- In office 30 August 2021 – 24 November 2022
- Monarch: Abdullah
- Prime Minister: Ismail Sabri Yaakob
- Minister: Abdul Latiff Ahmad
- Preceded by: Herself
- Succeeded by: Position abolished
- Constituency: Kuala Kangsar
- In office 10 March 2020 – 16 August 2021
- Monarch: Abdullah
- Prime Minister: Muhyiddin Yassin
- Minister: Mohd Redzuan Md Yusof
- Preceded by: Position established
- Succeeded by: Herself
- Constituency: Kuala Kangsar

Member of the Malaysian Parliament for Kuala Kangsar
- In office 18 June 2016 – 19 November 2022
- Preceded by: Wan Mohammad Khair-il Anuar (BN–UMNO)
- Succeeded by: Iskandar Dzulkarnain Abdul Khalid (PN–BERSATU)
- Majority: 6,969 (2016); 731 (2018)

Faction represented in Dewan Rakyat
- 2016–2022: Barisan Nasional

Personal details
- Born: Mastura binti Mohd Yazid Kota Bharu, Kelantan, Federation of Malaya (now Malaysia)
- Citizenship: Malaysian
- Party: United Malays National Organisation (UMNO)
- Other political affiliations: Barisan Nasional (BN)
- Spouse: Wan Mohammad Khair-il Anuar
- Relations: Tan Sri Mohd Yazid Baba (Father)
- Children: 4
- Education: University of Kent
- Occupation: Politician
- Website: www.masturayazid.com

Mastura binti Mohd Yazid (Jawi مستورة بنت محمد يزيد) is a Malaysian politician who served as the Deputy Minister in the Prime Minister's Department in charge of Special Functions for the second term in the Barisan Nasional (BN) administration under former Prime Minister Ismail Sabri Yaakob and former Minister Abdul Latiff Ahmad from August 2021 to the collapse of the BN administration in November 2022 and the first term in the Perikatan Nasional (PN) administration under former Prime Minister Muhyiddin Yassin and former Minister Mohd Redzuan Md Yusof from March 2020 to the collapse of the PN administration in August 2021 as well as the Member of Parliament (MP) for Kuala Kangsar from June 2016 to November 2022.

== Education ==
Mastura graduated with a Bachelor of Laws in Honors from the University of Kent, United Kingdom in 1984. The following year, she continued her studies at the Law School Education Law Council at the Inns of Court, London. 3 years later, she obtained a degree in Shariah Law and Practice at International Islamic University. In 2013, she received a Bachelor of Psychology in Open University of Malaysia.

== Career ==
Mastura began her career as an advocate and solicitor in 1986. She practiced law at her family's legal firm, Yazid Baba & Partners, run by her father Yazid Baba, the former Negeri Sembilan state assemblymen of Terentang (1974-1986). She has also been a translator since 2007.

== Politics ==
Mastura is a Member of the UMNO Women's Committee of the Telok Kemang Division, Negeri Sembilan. She often helps her husband Wan Mohammad Khair-il Anuar Wan Ahmad do charity work and dedicated to the people of Kuala Kangsar. In addition, Mastura is also active as a member of the Perak State Charity and Welfare Agency (BAIDURI).

=== Member of Parliament for Kuala Kangsar (2016–2022) ===
In 2016, Mastura was elected as the MP of Kuala Kangsar after she successfully defended the seat in the by-election triggered by the death of the incumbent MP, who was also her husband. In the 2018 general election, she was re-elected once again albeit with a decreased majority. In 2022 general election, she was dropped by the party to contest and instead nominate caretaker Member of the Perak State Legislative Assembly (MLA) for Bukit Chandan Maslin Sham Razman for the Kuala Kangsar federal seat.

=== Deputy Minister in the Prime Minister's Department in charge of Special Functions (2020–2021 & 2021–2022) ===
The 2020–2022 Malaysian political crisis overthrew the democratically elected Pakatan Harapan (PH) government in February 2020 and formed the Perikatan Nasional (PN) government in March 2020 led by Prime Minister Muhyiddin Yassin. Muhyiddin appointed Mastura as Deputy Minister in the Prime Minister's Department in charge of Special Functions on 10 March 2020. The PN government collapsed in August 2021, she lost the position as a result. The BN government led by Prime Minister Ismail Sabri Yaakob was then returned to replace the PN government, she was reappointed to the position by Ismail Sabri on 30 August 2021, along with many other ministers and deputy ministers in the PN government that were reappointed. As Mastura did not contest in the 2022 general election and stepping down as an MP, she also stepped down from the position and left the government.

== Personal life ==
Mastura is a widow of the late Wan Mohammad Khair-il Anuar Wan Ahmad. Her husband died on May 5, 2016, as a result of a helicopter crash in Sarawak.

Mastura is the mother of four sons - Wan Emir Astar, Wan Imar Izzat, Wan Iskandar and Wan Muhammad Ammar. Her eldest son, Wan Emir Astar was married with Malaysian actress and TV presenter, Mira Filzah.

== Election results ==
Parliament of Malaysia
| Year | Constituency | Candidate | Votes | Pct | Opponent(s) | Votes | Pct | Ballots cast | Majority | Turnout |
|---|---|---|---|---|---|---|---|---|---|---|
| 2016 | P067 Kuala Kangsar | Mastura Mohd Yazid (UMNO) | 12,653 | 54.37% | Najihatussalehah Ahmad (PAS) | 5,684 | 24.42% | 23,523 | 6,969 | 71.39% |
| 2016 | P067 Kuala Kangsar | Mastura Mohd Yazid (UMNO) | 12,653 | 54.37% | Ahmad Termizi Ramli (AMANAH) | 4,883 | 20.98% | 23,523 | 6,969 | 71.39% |
| 2016 | P067 Kuala Kangsar | Mastura Mohd Yazid (UMNO) | 12,653 | 54.37% | Izat Bukhary Ismail Bukhary (IND) | 54 | 0.23% | 23,523 | 6,969 | 71.39% |
| 2018 | P067 Kuala Kangsar | Mastura Mohd Yazid (UMNO) | 12,102 | 40.26% | Ahmad Termizi Ramli (AMANAH) | 11,371 | 37.83% | 30,701 | 731 | 83.08% |
| 2018 | P067 Kuala Kangsar | Mastura Mohd Yazid (UMNO) | 12,102 | 40.26% | Khalil Idham Lim Abdullah (PAS) | 6,583 | 21.90% | 30,701 | 731 | 83.08% |

== Honour ==
- Federal Territory (Malaysia)
  - Commander of the Order of the Territorial Crown (PMW) – Datuk (2021)
