= Supermax (Malaysia) =

Malaysian manufacturing company

Supermax Corporation Berhad
- Company type: Public limited company
- Traded as: MYX: 7106
- ISIN: MYL7106OO007
- Founded: 1987
- Founders: Stanley Thai Kim Sim; Cheryl Tan Bee Geok
- Headquarters: Lot 38, Putra Industrial Park, Bukit Rahman Putra, 47000 Sungai Buloh, Selangor, Malaysia
- Key people: Rafidah Aziz, Chairman; Stanley Thai Kim Sim, Group Managing Director; Cheryl Tan Bee Geok, Group Executive Director
- Website: www.supermax.com.my

Supermax Corporation Berhad (MYX: 7106) started as a trader and exporter of latex gloves in 1987 before venturing into manufacturing in 1989. It is Malaysia's largest Own Brand Manufacturer and the world's second largest producer of rubber gloves.

The Supermax Group was founded by Dato' Seri Stanley Thai and his wife Datin Seri Cheryl Tan in 1987 as a trading business distributing latex gloves.

Supermax has succeeded in establishing its own brands with a strong presence in Canada, the U.S., the United Kingdom and Brazil. Almost 100% of its production is exported to medical and dental buyers.

Its main competitors are Kimberly-Clark, Ansell, Allegiance and Microflex.

In 2020 during the COVID-19 pandemic, strong demand for rubber gloves sent Supermax's share prices on a five-fold jump. Founder Thai Kim Sim recorded an estimated net worth of $1 billion at the stock high in early June 2020.

In November 2020, the company donated a total of RM75 million to the Government’s COVID-19 fund set up to battle the pandemic.

In October 2021, United States banned imports from Supermax citing forced labour. A month after, Canada terminated its contracts.

On 15 June 2022, the Government Pension Fund of Norway placed Supermax under observation due to "unacceptable risk that the company contributes to serious violations of human rights".

== Controversies ==
In November 2021, Canada ends contract with Malaysia's Supermax over labor allegations. Based on the seriousness of the allegations and expected timelines for the final audit results, the government of Canada has decided, and Supermax Healthcare Canada has agreed, to terminate by mutual consent the two existing contracts for the supply of nitrile gloves.

In June 2022, Norway's sovereign wealth fund, Norges Bank Investment Management, put Supermax under observation for two years, citing allegations of unacceptable risk that the company contributes to serious violations of human rights.

== Subsidiaries ==
- Supermax Glove Manufacturing Sdn Bhd
- Maxter Glove Manufacturing Sdn Bhd
- Maxwell Glove Manufacturing Bhd
- Supermax Latex Products Sdn Bhd
- Supermax International Sdn Bhd
- Supermax Energy Sdn Bhd
- Supermax Healthcare Canada
- Supermax Global Ltd (Bermuda)
- White Oak Global Property Ltd (USA)
