= Hilir Padas =

Sabah constituency

Defunct federal constituency
- Legislature: Dewan Rakyat
- Constituency created: 1974
- Constituency abolished: 1986
- First contested: 1974
- Last contested: 1982

Hilir Padas was a federal constituency in Sabah, Malaysia, that was represented in the Dewan Rakyat from 1974 to 1986.

The federal constituency was created in the 1974 redistribution and was mandated to return a single member to the Dewan Rakyat under the first past the post voting system.

== History ==
It was abolished in 1986 when it was redistributed.

=== Representation history ===
Members of Parliament for Hilir Padas
Parliament	No	Years	Member	Party	Vote Share
Constituency created from Labuan-Beaufort
4th	P126	1974-1978	Mohammad Taufeck Asneh (محمد تاوفيچق اسنيه)	BN (USNO)	Uncontested
5th	P126	1978-1982	Mohammad Taufeck Asneh (محمد تاوفيچق اسنيه)	BN (USNO)	6,668; 50.28%
6th	P126	1982-1986	Mohammed Yussof Yakob (محمد يوسسوف ياقوب)	Independent	8,761; 53.36%
Constituency abolished, split into Kimanis, Limbawang and Labuan

=== State constituency ===
Parliamentary constituency	State constituency					
Parliamentary constituency	1967–1974	1974–1985	1985–1995	1995–2004	2004–2020	2020–present
Hilir Padas		Klias				
Hilir Padas		Labuan				
Hilir Padas		Lumadan				

=== Historical boundaries ===
State Constituency	Area
State Constituency	1974
Klias	Kampung Tempurong; Kampung Tenggilung; Klias; Kuala Penyu; Membakut
Labuan	Menumbok; Pohon Batu; Tanjung Aru; Timbalai; Victoria
Lumadan	Beaufort; Halogilat; Kampung Lingkungan; Lumadan; Weston

== Election results ==
Malaysian general election, 1982: Hilir Padas
Party	Candidate	Votes	%	∆%
Independent	Mohammed Yussof Yakob	8,761	53.36	▲53.36
BN	Omar Mohamed Beldram	7,659	46.64	▼3.64
Total valid votes		16,420	100.00	
Total rejected ballots		261		
Unreturned ballots		0		
Turnout		16,681	70.38	▲0.46
Registered electors		23,700		
Majority		1,102	6.72	▲6.16
Independent gain from BN		Swing		?

Malaysian general election, 1978: Hilir Padas
Party	Candidate	Votes	%	∆%
BN	Mohammad Taufeck Asneh	6,668	50.28	▲50.28
Independent	Norsuadah Basah	6,595	49.72	▲49.72
Total valid votes		13,263	100.00	
Total rejected ballots		1,005		
Unreturned ballots		0		
Turnout		14,268	69.92	
Registered electors		20,406		
Majority		73	0.56	
BN hold		Swing		

Malaysian general election, 1974: Hilir Padas
Party	Candidate	Votes	%
On the nomination day, Mohammad Taufeck Asneh won uncontested.
BN	Mohammad Taufeck Asneh		
Total valid votes			100.00
Total rejected ballots			
Unreturned ballots			
Turnout			
Registered electors		15,112	
Majority			
This was a new constituency created.
