= Bashir Alias =

Malaysian politician

Yang Berbahagia Datuk Bashir Alias DPSM AMN
- بشير ألياس

Senator Appointed by the Yang di-Pertuan Agong

Representing Labuan
- In office 22 June 2020 – 3 November 2022
- Monarch: Abdullah
- Prime Minister: Muhyiddin Yassin (2020–2021); Ismail Sabri Yaakob (2021–2022)
- Succeeded by: Anifah Aman

Senator Appointed by the Yang di-Pertuan Agong
- In office 5 June 2017 – 4 June 2020
- Monarchs: Muhammad V (2017–2019); Abdullah (2019–2020)
- Prime Minister: Najib Razak (2017–2018); Mahathir Mohamad (2018–2020); Muhyiddin Yassin (2020)

Other Positions
- 2016–2018: Chairman of Labuan Corporation Advisory Council (1st term)
- 2020–2022: Chairman of Labuan Corporation Advisory Council (2nd term)

Faction represented in Dewan Negara
- 2017–2022: Barisan Nasional

Personal details
- Born: Bashir Haji Alias; 1966 (age 59–60) Labuan, Sabah, Malaysia (now a Federal Territory)
- Party: United Malays National Organization (UMNO)
- Other political affiliations: Barisan Nasional (BN); Muafakat Nasional (MN)

Datuk Bashir bin Haji Alias (born 1966) is a Malaysian politician who had served as a Member of the Senate of Malaysia for the first term from 2017 until 2020 and for his second term, he represented Labuan from 2020 until his resignation in 2022 to contest in the 2022 general election. He is the Division Chief of Labuan of the United Malays National Organization (UMNO), a component party of the Barisan Nasional (BN) coalition. He was firstly appointed as the Chairman of the Labuan Corporation Advisory Council in 2016 to 2018 to replace the late Yunus Kurus, a former Senator in his own right. Then he was reappointed again for a second term, serving from 2020 to 2022 to replace Rozman Isli, who crossed the floor from UMNO to WARISAN.

== Election results ==
Parliament of Malaysia
Year	Constituency	Candidate	Votes	Pct	Opponent(s)	Votes	Pct	Ballots cast	Majority	Turnout
2022	P166 Labuan	Bashir Alias (UMNO)	7,416	26.07%	Suhaili Abdul Rahman (BERSATU)	8,124	28.56%	28,762	708	63.95%
2022	P166 Labuan	Bashir Alias (UMNO)	7,416	26.07%	Rozman Isli (WARISAN)	7,310	25.70%	28,762	708	63.95%
2022	P166 Labuan	Bashir Alias (UMNO)	7,416	26.07%	Ramli Tahir (AMANAH)	5,307	18.65%	28,762	708	63.95%
2022	P166 Labuan	Bashir Alias (UMNO)	7,416	26.07%	Dayang Rusimah (PBM)	202	0.71%	28,762	708	63.95%
2022	P166 Labuan	Bashir Alias (UMNO)	7,416	26.07%	Ramle Mat Daly (PEJUANG)	90	0.32%	28,762	708	63.95%

== Honours ==
- Malaysia
  - Member of the Order of the Defender of the Realm (AMN) (2006)
- Malacca
  - Companion Class II of the Exalted Order of Malacca (DPSM) – Datuk (2011)
