= Yussof Mahal =

Malaysian politician (born 1957)

Yang Berbahagia Datuk Yussof Mahal DMSM AMN
- يوسف محل

Member of the Malaysian Parliament for Labuan
- In office 2008–2013
- Preceded by: Suhaili Abdul Rahman
- Succeeded by: Rozman Isli

Personal details
- Born: 1 May 1956 Labuan, Crown Colony of North Borneo
- Died: 12 December 2025 (aged 69) Labuan, Federal Territories, Malaysia
- Party: United Malays National Organisation (UMNO)
- Other political affiliations: Barisan Nasional (BN); Perikatan Nasional (PN); Muafakat Nasional (MN)
- Spouse: Isfahani Ishak
- Children: Yusani; Saiful Ysfazil; Siti Anizah; Mohamad Safuan
- Education: Universiti Teknologi Malaysia
- Occupation: Politician
- Website: yussofmahal.blogspot.com

Yussof bin Mahal (1 May 1956 – 12 December 2025) was the Member of the Parliament of Malaysia for the Labuan constituency, representing the United Malays National Organisation (UMNO), a component party of Barisan Nasional (BN) coalition, for one term from 2008 to 2013.

== Family ==
Yussof was married to Isfahani Ishak, with the couple having four children.

== Political career ==
Yussof was elected to federal Parliament for the Labuan constituency in the 2008 election. He replaced fellow UMNO member Suhaili Abdul Rahman who was dropped by the party following a factional dispute. Yussof himself was replaced as UMNO's candidate for the 2013 election, by Rozman Isli.

== Election results ==
Parliament of Malaysia
Year	Constituency	Candidate	Votes	Pct	Opponent(s)	Votes	Pct	Ballots cast	Majority	Turnout
2008	P166 Labuan	Yussof Mahal (UMNO)	10,471	74.00%	Lau Seng Kiat (IND)	2,014	14.23%	14,149	8,457	68.08%
2008	P166 Labuan	Yussof Mahal (UMNO)	10,471	74.00%	Matusin Abdul Rahman (PAS)	1,106	7.82%	14,149	8,457	68.08%

== Honours ==
- Malaysia
  - Member of the Order of the Defender of the Realm (AMN) (2002)
- Malacca
  - Companion Class I of the Exalted Order of Malacca (DMSM) – Datuk (2004)
