= Wan Mohammad Khair-il Anuar =

Malaysian politician

Yang Berbahagia Datuk Wan Mohammad Khair-il Anuar PJN AMP
- وان محمد خيرالأنور وان أحمد

Member of the Malaysian Parliament for Kuala Kangsar
- In office 5 May 2013 – 5 May 2016
- Preceded by: Rafidah Aziz (BN–UMNO)
- Succeeded by: Mastura Mohd Yazid (BN–UMNO)
- Majority: 1,082 (2013)

Member of the Perak State Legislative Assembly for Bukit Chandan
- In office 8 March 2008 – 5 May 2013
- Preceded by: Ahmad Jaffar (BN–UMNO)
- Succeeded by: Maslin Sham Razman (BN–UMNO)
- Majority: 1,694 (2008)

Personal details
- Born: Wan Mohammad Khair-il Anuar bin Wan Ahmad; 16 January 1960 Kuala Kangsar, Perak, Federation of Malaya (now Malaysia)
- Died: 5 May 2016 (aged 56) Near Betong, Sarawak, Malaysia
- Resting place: Al-Ghufran Royal Mausoleum, Kuala Kangsar, Perak
- Citizenship: Malaysian
- Party: United Malays National Organisation (UMNO) (–2016)
- Other political affiliations: Barisan Nasional (BN) (–2016)
- Spouse: Mastura Mohd Yazid
- Children: 4 sons
- Education: Kingston University

Datuk Wan Mohammad Khair-il Anuar bin Wan Ahmad (16 January 1960 – 5 May 2016) was a Malaysian politician, architect, and entrepreneur who served as the Member of Parliament (MP) for Kuala Kangsar from May 2013 to his death after three years in May 2016. He also served as the Chairman of Malaysian Palm Oil Board (MPOB). He was a native of Kuala Kangsar. Wan Khair-il Anuar was a member of the United Malays National Organisation (UMNO) in the Barisan Nasional (BN) coalition.

== Education ==
Wan Khair-il Anuar received his primary education in Sekolah Kebangsaan Clifford, Kuala Kangsar from 1967 to 1972. During his secondary education, he went to three different schools: Sekolah Menengah Clifford, Sekolah Menengah Anderson and Sungai Petani Science School (Boarding School) in Kedah.

With an excellent achievement during his secondary education, Wan Khair-il Anuar was sent by the government to further his studies in architecture abroad. His first stop was the City College Plymouth, where he obtained distinction in his "A level" program. Then, he was accepted to the Kingston University where he was awarded a BA (Hons) Architecture and Master in Architecture.

== Professional career ==
In 1990, Wan Khair-il Anuar set up an architecture firm, which is based in Kuala Lumpur. Wan Khair-il Anuar was also appointed as Chairman of Malaysian Palm Oil Board (MPOB). He has also been a board member of Damansara Realty Berhad, a public listed company.

Wan Khair-il Anuar was inducted into various professional organizations. In 1990, he became a member of Pertubuhan Arkitek Malaysia (PAM), followed by Royal Institute of British Architects (RIBA) in 1992 and Institut Perekabentuk Dalaman Malaysia (IPDM) in 1995.

== Political career ==
- Committee Members of UMNO Youth's Kuala Kangsar Division: 1989–1993
- Head of UMNO Youth's Branch: 1989–2002
- Head of UMNO Youth's Kuala Kangsar Division: 1998–2001
- Deputy Chairman of UMNO's Informative Youth Malaysia: 1999–2000
- Exco of UMNO Youth Malaysia: 2000–2004
- Head of UMNO Bukit Chandan's Branch: 2002
- Deputy Head of UMNO Kuala Kangsar Division: 2004–2012
- Members of State Legislative Assembly Bukit Chandan: 2008–2012
- Head of UMNO Kuala Kangsar Division: 2013–2016

== Death ==
Wan Khair-il Anuar was killed in a helicopter crash near Sebuyau, Sarawak. He was travelling with several other government officials from Betong to Kuching on 5 May 2016 during election when the helicopter lost contact with ground officials. Debris were found near Batang Lupar river the following day. The crash also involved Tan Sri Dato' Hajjah Noriah Kasnon, the Deputy Minister of Plantation Industries and Commodities and member of parliament for Sungai Besar, Selangor. Wan Mohammad Khair-il Anuar's remains were flown back to Perak and he was laid to rest at the Al-Ghufran Royal Mausoleum near Ubudiah Mosque, Kuala Kangsar.

His widow, Mastura Mohd Yazid who was picked by BN to re-contest the Kuala Kangsar by-election, had successfully defended the seat to succeed him as the new MP of Kuala Kangsar.

== Election results ==
Perak State Legislative Assembly
Year	Constituency	Candidate	Votes	Pct	Opponent(s)	Votes	Pct	Ballots cast	Majority	Turnout
2008	N34 Bukit Chandan	Wan Khair-il Anuar (UMNO)	5,850	55.62%	Zulkifli Ibrahim (PKR)	4,156	39.51%	10,518	1,694	74.01%

Parliament of Malaysia
Year	Constituency	Candidate	Votes	Pct	Opponent(s)	Votes	Pct	Ballots cast	Majority	Turnout
2013	P067 Kuala Kangsar	Wan Khair-il Anuar (UMNO)	14,218	50.40%	Khalil Idham Lim Abdullah (PAS)	13,136	46.44%	28,283	1,082	84.33%
2013	P067 Kuala Kangsar	Wan Khair-il Anuar (UMNO)	14,218	50.40%	Kamilia Ibrahim (IND)	447	1.58%	28,283	1,082	84.33%

== Honours ==
- Malaysia
  - Commander of the Order of Meritorious Service (PJN) – Datuk (2016 – Posthumously)
- Perak
  - Member of the Order of the Perak State Crown (AMP) (1999)
