= Rafidah Aziz =

Malaysian politician

Yang Berbahagia Tan Sri Dato' Seri Rafidah Aziz PMN SPMP SPMT DGSM PNBS DPMS AMN
- رفيدة بنت عزيز
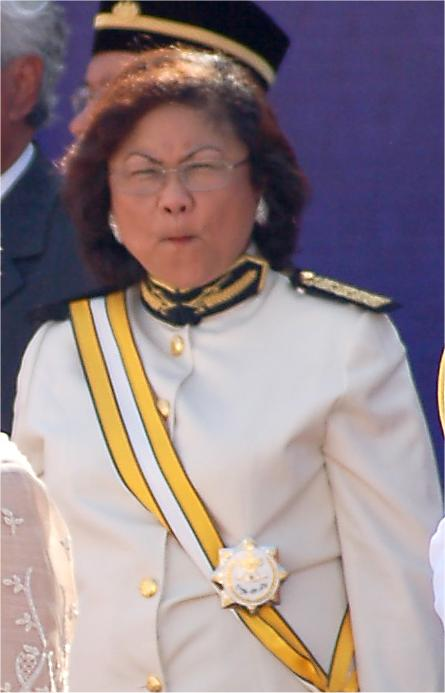
- Rafidah in 2007

Minister of International Trade and Industry
- In office 27 October 1990 – 18 March 2008
- Monarchs: Azlan Shah; Ja'afar; Salahuddin; Sirajuddin; Mizan Zainal Abidin
- Prime Minister: Mahathir Mohamad; Abdullah Ahmad Badawi
- Deputy: Chua Jui Meng (1990–1995); Kerk Choo Ting (1995–2004); Ahmad Husni Hanadzlah (2004–2008); Mah Siew Keong (2004–2006); Ng Lip Yong (2006–2008)
- Preceded by: Herself as Minister of Trade and Industry
- Succeeded by: Muhyiddin Yassin
- Constituency: Kuala Kangsar

Minister of Trade and Industry
- In office 20 May 1987 – 26 October 1990
- Monarchs: Iskandar; Azlan Shah
- Prime Minister: Mahathir Mohamad
- Deputy: Kok Wee Kiat
- Preceded by: Tengku Razaleigh Hamzah
- Succeeded by: Herself (International Trade and Industry); Sulaiman Daud (Domestic Trade)
- Constituency: Kuala Kangsar

Minister of Public Enterprises
- In office 29 July 1980 – 20 May 1987
- Monarchs: Ahmad Shah; Iskandar
- Prime Minister: Hussein Onn; Mahathir Mohamad
- Deputy: Daud Taha (1986–1987)
- Preceded by: Abdul Manan Othman
- Succeeded by: Napsiah Omar
- Constituency: Selayang; Kuala Kangsar

Women Chief of United Malay National Organisation
- In office 16 January 2000 – 26 March 2009
- President: Mahathir Mohamad; Abdullah Ahmad Badawi
- Preceded by: Siti Zaharah Sulaiman
- Succeeded by: Shahrizat Abdul Jalil
- In office 24 April 1987 – 9 October 1996
- President: Mahathir Mohamad
- Preceded by: Aishah Ghani
- Succeeded by: Siti Zaharah Sulaiman

Member of the Malaysian Parliament for Kuala Kangsar
- In office 22 April 1982 – 5 May 2013
- Preceded by: Yong Fatimah Mohd. Razali (BN–UMNO)
- Succeeded by: Wan Mohammad Khair-il Anuar Wan Ahmad (BN–UMNO)
- Majority: 8,556 (1982); 9,598 (1986); 7,994 (1990); 10,649 (1995); 2,774 (1999); 6,191 (2004); 1,458 (2008)

Member of the Malaysian Parliament for Selayang
- In office 22 July 1978 – 21 April 1982
- Preceded by: Rosemary Chow Poh Kheng (BN–MCA)
- Succeeded by: Rahmah Othman (BN–UMNO)
- Majority: 21,270 (1978)

Personal details
- Born: Rafidah binti Aziz; 4 November 1943 (age 82) Kuala Kangsar, Perak, Japanese occupation of Malaya (now Malaysia)
- Party: United Malays National Organisation (UMNO) (until 2018); Independent (since 2018)
- Other political affiliations: Barisan Nasional (BN) (until 2018)
- Education: University of Malaya
- Occupation: Politician

Rafidah binti Aziz (Jawi: رفيدة بنت عزيز; born 4 November 1943) is a Malaysian politician who was Member of Parliament (MP) for the Selayang from 1978 to 1982 and Kuala Kangsar constituency from 1982 to 2013. Born in Kuala Kangsar, Perak, Rafidah was Minister of International Trade and Industry from 1987 to 2008. As minister, she was the chairman of MATRADE beginning in 1991. She was a veteran politician from United Malays National Organisation (UMNO) of Barisan Nasional (BN) until 2018.

== Early career ==
Rafidah graduated with a Bachelor of Arts degree in Economics in 1966 and a master's degree in Economics in 1970 from the University of Malaya. She then began her career as a tutor and lecturer in the Faculty of Economics, University of Malaya from 1966 to 1976.

== Political career ==
Rafidah was an active member in the Malaysian political scene, having previously been appointed as a Member of the Malaysian Parliament. She was appointed as Senator in 1974 and resigned to contest in the General Elections in 1978. She served as Member of Parliament in the Selayang Constituency (from 1978 to 1982) and Kuala Kangsar Constituency (from 1982 to 2013). She served in the UMNO Supreme Council for 38 years since winning a seat in the council in 1975. She is Malaysia's longest-serving Trade Minister, having served in that capacity from 1987 to 2008. Previously, she also hold the portfolio of Minister of Public Enterprises from 1980 to 1987 and Deputy Minister of Finance from 1977 to 1980. In 1976, she was appointed as Parliamentary Secretary in the Ministry of Public Enterprises.

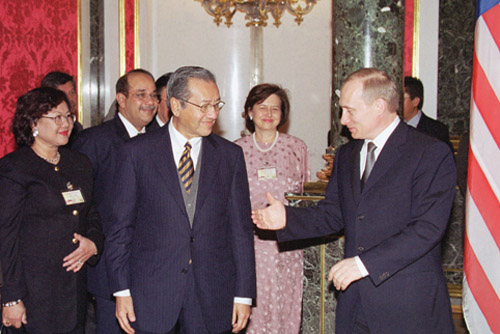
Rafidah with Mahathir Mohamad and Vladimir Putin in 2002

Rafidah was the head of United Malays National Organisation's Woman Wing (Wanita UMNO in Malay) from 1999 to 2009, before losing out in the 2009 UMNO General Assembly election to Shahrizat Abdul Jalil after seeking re-election for another term. She is holding the title of the longest serving woman MP in Malaysia from 1978 to 2013 for 35 years.

In 2006, Rafidah was accused of corruption related to the issuance of Approved Permits (AP) for importing foreign vehicles by former Prime Minister Mahathir Mohamad in his series of criticisms against the Government of Malaysia. Mahathir had also criticised then Prime Minister Abdullah Ahmad Badawi's handling of the Approved Permits (AP) issue, expressing his surprise that Rafidah was still retained as a Cabinet member although two people on the list of persons issued with highest number of APs were linked to her.

In March 2008, following the general election held in that month, Rafidah was dropped from cabinet, despite winning her parliamentary seat when other ministers had lost theirs. After thirty-two years in government service, and twenty years as a minister, she described herself as being "blessed and content." When asked if she was saddened, she said that she wished Prime Minister Abdullah Ahmad Badawi had told her earlier on not to contest the election.

In 2018, she was fired from UMNO ahead of the 2018 general election which saw the failure of the party and BN to maintain the power as a ruling government for the first time in history.

== Post political career ==
Rafidah was the Non-Executive Independent Chairman and Director of AirAsia X since March 3, 2011, until her resignation on March 9, 2026. She was also the Chairman of Supermax Corporation Berhad from June 16, 2015 until her resignation on April 16, 2018.

On 5 May 2018, UMNO had announced it had fired three party veterans including Rafidah with Daim Zainuddin and Rais Yatim for supporting the opposition, Pakatan Harapan then. However she claimed she had ceased being a member of UMNO since almost a decade ago.

Rafidah was appointed one of the members Economic Action Council (EAC) by the new PH government on 11 February 2019.

== Election results ==
Parliament of Malaysia
Year	Constituency	Candidate	Votes	Pct	Opponent(s)	Votes	Pct	Ballots cast	Majority	Turnout
1978	P077 Selayang	Rafidah Aziz (UMNO)	38,627	66.65%	Zainal Rampak (DAP)	17,357	29.95%		21,270	
1978	P077 Selayang	Rafidah Aziz (UMNO)	38,627	66.65%	Zainuddin Karim (PEKEMAS)	1,973	3.40%		21,270	
1982	P052 Kuala Kangsar	Rafidah Aziz (UMNO)	12,159	65.27%	Harikrishnan Vallappan (DAP)	3,603	19.34%	19,156	8,556	72.19%
1982	P052 Kuala Kangsar	Rafidah Aziz (UMNO)	12,159	65.27%	Muhammad Harun (PAS)	2,867	15.39%	19,156	8,556	72.19%
1986	P061 Kuala Kangsar	Rafidah Aziz (UMNO)	16,196	71.05%	Ab Aziz Ishak (PAS)	6,598	28.95%	23,452	9,598	63.94%
1990	P061 Kuala Kangsar	Rafidah Aziz (UMNO)	16,548	65.92%	Jamaluddin Mohd Din (S46)	8,554	34.08%	25,926	7,994	68.84%
1995	P064 Kuala Kangsar	Rafidah Aziz (UMNO)	15,393	76.44%	Abdul Kahlid Mohd Nasir (S46)	4,744	23.56%	20,989	10,649	65.56%
1999	P064 Kuala Kangsar	Rafidah Aziz (UMNO)	12,074	56.49%	Asmuni Awi (PAS)	9,300	43.51%	21,886	2,774	64.69%
2004	P067 Kuala Kangsar	Rafidah Aziz (UMNO)	12,938	65.73%	Mohammad Nizar Jamaluddin (PAS)	6,747	34.27%	20,184	6,191	71.09%
2008	P067 Kuala Kangsar	Rafidah Aziz (UMNO)	10,735	53.64%	Khairuddin Abd Malik (PAS)	9,277	46.36%	20,773	1,458	73.34%

== Awards and recognitions ==
Rafidah was the main recipient of the Nona Superwoman Award in 2018.

== Honours ==
=== Honours of Malaysia ===
- Malaysia
  - Member of the Order of the Defender of the Realm (AMN) (1973)
  - Commander of the Order of the Defender of the Realm (PMN) – Tan Sri (2008)
- Selangor
  - Commander of the Order of the Crown of Selangor (DPMS) – Datin Paduka (1979)
- Perak
  - Grand Commander of the Order of the Perak State Crown (SPMP) – Dato' Seri (1989)
- Terengganu
  - Grand Commander of the Order of the Crown of Terengganu (SPMT) – Dato' (1998)
- Sarawak
  - Grand Commander of the Most Exalted Order of the Star of Sarawak (PNBS) – Dato Sri (2003)
- Malacca
  - Grand Commander of the Exalted Order of Malacca (DGSM) – Datuk Seri (2007)

=== Foreign honours ===
- Chile
  - Grand Cross of the Order of Bernardo O'Higgins (1994)
