= 2016 Kuala Kangsar by-election =

- 18 June 2016

Constituency of Kuala Kangsar
- Registered: 32,949
- Turnout: 71.39%
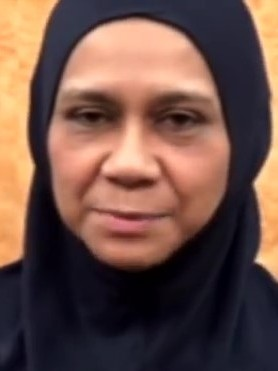
		PAS	AMANAH
Candidate	Mastura Mohd Yazid	Najihatussalehah Ahmad	Ahmad Termizi Ramli
Party	Barisan Nasional (UMNO)	Gagasan Sejahtera (PAS)	Pakatan Harapan (AMANAH)
Popular vote	12,653	5,684	4,883
Percentage	54.37%	24.42%	20.98%
Swing	▲03.23%	▼22.83%	N/A
MP before election
Wan Mohammad Khair-il Anuar
Barisan Nasional (UMNO)
Elected MP
Mastura Mohd Yazid
Barisan Nasional (UMNO)

A by-election was held for the Dewan Rakyat seat of P67 Kuala Kangsar, a parliamentary seat located in the state of Perak, Malaysia on 18 June 2016 following the nomination day on 5 June 2016. The seat fell vacant after death of member of parliament Wan Mohammad Khair-il Anuar Wan Ahmad, who died in a helicopter crash on May 5, 2016 while campaigning in the Sarawak state election. In the 2013 general election, Wan Mohammad Khair-il Anuar Wan Ahmad won the seat with a majority of 1,082 votes beating Khalil Idham Lim Abdullah of Pan-Malaysian Islamic Party (PAS) and independent candidate Kamilia Ibrahim. This by-election was held concurrently with the Sungai Besar by-election for the same reason.

The Barisan Nasional candidate for Kuala Kangsar was United Malays National Organisation (UMNO) member Mastura Mohd Yazid who is the widow of the former MP Wan Mohammad Khair-il Anuar Wan Ahmad. The PAS candidate chosen was Najihatussalehah Ahmad. The opposition coalition Pakatan Harapan chose National Trust Party (AMANAH) vice chairman Ahmad Termizi Ramli as their candidate. Izat Bukhary Ismail Bukhary joined the race as an independent on the nomination day.

== Results ==
Mastura Mohd Yazid managed to retain the seat for Barisan Nasional with a majority of 6,969 votes beating 3 other candidates.

Malaysian general by-election, 18 June 2016: Kuala Kangsar The by-election was called due to the death of incumbent, Wan Mohammad Khair-il Anuar Wan Ahmad.
Party	Candidate	Votes	%	∆%
BN	Mastura Mohd Yazid	12,653	54.37	▲3.23
PAS	Najihatussalehah Ahmad	5,684	24.42	▼22.83
Amanah	Ahmad Termizi Ramli	4,883	20.98	N/A
Independent	Izat Bukhary Ismail Bukhary	54	0.23	N/A
Total valid votes		23,274	100.00	
Total rejected ballots		239		
Unreturned ballots		10		
Turnout		23,523	71.39	
Registered electors		32,949		
Majority		6,969	29.95	
BN hold		Swing		
Source(s) "Pilihan Raya Kecil P.067 Kuala Kangsar". Election Commission of Malaysia. "Federal Government Gazette - Notice of Contested Election - By-election of the Dewan Rakyat of P.067 Kuala Kangsar for the State of Perak [P.U. (B) 271/2016]" (PDF). Attorney General's Chambers of Malaysia. 6 June 2016. Archived from the original (PDF) on 2017-06-13. "Federal Government Gazette - Results of Contested Election and Statement of the Poll after the Official Addition of Votes for the By-election of P.067 Kuala Kangsar [P. U. (B) 298/2016]" (PDF). Attorney General's Chambers of Malaysia. 23 June 2016. Archived from the original (PDF) on 2017-03-27.
