= Labuan (federal constituency) =

Federal constituency of Sabah, Malaysia

Labuan (P166)
Labuan constituency

Federal constituency
- Legislature: Dewan Rakyat
- MP: Suhaili Abdul Rahman; Independent
- Constituency created: 1984
- First contested: 1986
- Last contested: 2022

Demographics
- Population (2020): 95,120
- Electors (2022): 44,484
- Area (km²): 96
- Pop. density (per km²): 990.8

Labuan is a federal constituency representing the Federal Territory of Labuan, Malaysia, that has been represented in the Dewan Rakyat since 1986.

The federal constituency was created from parts of the Hilir Padas constituency in the 1984 redistribution and is mandated to return a single member to the Dewan Rakyat under the first past the post voting system.

== Demographics ==
https://live.chinapress.com.my/ge15/parliament/LABUAN

Ethnic breakdown of Labuan's electorate as of 2022
1. Sabah Bumiputera (49.2%)
2. Malay-Muslim Bumiputera (32.6%)
3. Chinese (16.9%)
4. Other ethnicities (1.21%)

As of 2020, Labuan has a population of 95,120 people.

Age breakdown of Labuan's electorate as of 2022
1. 18-20 (7.25%)
2. 21-29 (23.6%)
3. 30-39 (24.5%)
4. 40-49 (15.6%)
5. 50-59 (13.0%)
6. 60-69 (10.4%)
7. 70-79 (3.94%)
8. 80-89 (1.19%)
9. above 90 (0.46%)
Gender breakdown of Labuan's electorate as of 2022
1. Male (52.3%)
2. Female (47.7%)

== History ==
=== Polling districts ===
According to the gazette issued on 31 October 2022, the Labuan constituency has a total of 17 polling districts.

Polling District	Code	Location
Kubong	166/00/01	SK Lubok Temiang
Layangan	166/00/02	SK Layang-Layangan
Lajau	166/00/03	Kolej Vokasional Labuan; SMK Lajau
Ganggarak	166/00/04	Kolej Matrikulasi Labuan
Lada	166/00/05	SK Sungai Lada
Benuwa	166/00/06	SK Bebuloh; SK Sungai Bedaun
Lapangan Terbang	166/00/07	SK Pantai
Victoria Utara	166/00/08	SMK Labuan
Victoria Selatan	166/00/09	SMK Pekan II WP Labuan
Ramsay	166/00/10	SJK (C) Chi Wen
Rancha-Rancha	166/00/11	SK Rancha-Rancha
Kerupang	166/00/12	SK Kerupang
Kampong Batu Arang	166/00/13	SK Pekan I WP Labuan; SMK Pantai Labuan
Patau-Patau	166/00/14	SK Patau-Patau
Sungai Keling	166/00/15	SJK (C) Chung Hwa
Bukit Kalam	166/00/16	SK Bukit Kallam; SMK Mutiara
Tanjung Aru	166/00/17	SK Tanjung Aru

=== Representation history ===
Members of Parliament for Labuan
Parliament	No	Years	Member	Party	Vote Share
Constituency created from Hilir Padas
7th	P133	1986–1990	Abdul Mulok Awang Damit (عبد الملوك أواڠ داميت)	Independent	2,448; 30.28%
8th	P133	1990–1995	Abdul Mulok Awang Damit (عبد الملوك أواڠ داميت)	BN (UMNO)	7,130; 59.69%
9th	P145	1995–1999	Abdul Mulok Awang Damit (عبد الملوك أواڠ داميت)	BN (UMNO)	9,076; 69.79%
10th	P145	1999–2004	Suhaili Abdul Rahman (سهيلي عبدالرحمن)	BN (UMNO)	8,687; 71.34%
11th	P166	2004–2008	Suhaili Abdul Rahman (سهيلي عبدالرحمن)	BN (UMNO)	11,087; 77.68%
12th	P166	2008–2013	Yussof Mahal (يوسف محل)	BN (UMNO)	10,471; 77.04%
13th	P166	2013–2018	Rozman Isli (روزمن إسلي)	BN (UMNO)	12,694; 66.29%
14th	P166	2018	Rozman Isli (روزمن إسلي)	BN (UMNO)	10,164; 47.59%
14th	P166	2018–2022	Rozman Isli (روزمن إسلي)	WARISAN	10,164; 47.59%
15th	P166	2022–2024	Suhaili Abdul Rahman (سهيلي عبدالرحمن)	PN (BERSATU)	8,124; 28.56%
15th	P166	2024–present	Suhaili Abdul Rahman (سهيلي عبدالرحمن)	Independent	8,124; 28.56%

=== Local governments & postcodes ===
No.	Local Government	Postcode
P166	Labuan Corporation	87500 Labuan

== Election results ==
Malaysian general election, 2022
Party	Candidate	Votes	%	∆%
PN	Suhaili Abdul Rahman	8,124	28.56	▲28.56
BN	Bashir Alias	7,416	26.07	▼21.52
Heritage	Rozman Isli	7,310	25.70	▼15.10
PH	Ramli Tahir	5,307	18.65	▲18.65
PBM	Dayang Rusimah @ Raynie Mohd Din	202	0.71	▲0.71
PEJUANG	Ramle Mat Daly	90	0.32	▲0.32
Total valid votes		28,449	100.00	
Total rejected ballots		246		
Unreturned ballots		67		
Turnout		28,762	63.95	▼12.68
Registered electors		44,484		
Majority		708	2.49	▼4.30
PN gain from BN		Swing		?
Source(s) https://lom.agc.gov.my/ilims/upload/portal/akta/outputp/1753256/PUB%20618%20(2022)%20-%20WP%20LABUAN.pdf

Malaysian general election, 2018
Party	Candidate	Votes	%	∆%
BN	Rozman Isli	10,164	47.59	▼18.70
Sabah Heritage Party	Noor Halim Zaini	8,714	40.80	▲40.80
PAS	Ahmad Junid @ Junit Mohd Aling @ Aling	1,555	7.28	▲5.26
Sabah People's Hope Party	Siti Zaleha Ibrahim	925	4.33	▲4.33
Total valid votes		21,358	100.00	
Total rejected ballots		302		
Unreturned ballots		69		
Turnout		21,729	76.63	▼2.54
Registered electors		28,356		
Majority		1,450	6.79	▼27.81
BN hold		Swing		
Source(s) "His Majesty's Government Gazette - Notice of Contested Election, Parliament for the Federal Territory of Labuan [P.U. (B) 245/2018]" (PDF). Attorney General's Chambers of Malaysia. 3 May 2018. "Federal Government Gazette - Results of Contested Election and Statements of the Poll after the Official Addition of Votes, Parliamentary Constituencies for the Federal Territory of Labuan [P.U. (B) 319/2018]" (PDF). Attorney General's Chambers of Malaysia. 28 May 2018.

Malaysian general election, 2013
Party	Candidate	Votes	%	∆%
BN	Rozman Isli	12,694	66.29	▲66.29
PKR	Ibrahim Menudin	6,069	31.69	▲31.69
PAS	Hadnan Mohamad	386	2.02	▼6.12
Total valid votes		19,149	100.00	
Total rejected ballots		207		
Unreturned ballots		21		
Turnout		19,377	79.17	▲11.09
Registered electors		24,474		
Majority		6,625	34.60	▼27.62
BN hold		Swing		
Source(s) "Federal Government Gazette - Notice of Contested Election, Parliament for the Federal Territory of Labuan [P.U. (B) 182/2013]" (PDF). Attorney General's Chambers of Malaysia. 26 April 2013. Archived from the original (PDF) on 2017-03-28. "Federal Government Gazette - Results of Contested Election and Statements of the Poll after the Official Addition of Votes, Parliamentary Constituencies for the Federal Territory of Labuan [P.U. (B) 223/2013]" (PDF). Attorney General's Chambers of Malaysia. 22 May 2013. Archived from the original (PDF) on 2017-03-28.

Malaysian general election, 2008
Party	Candidate	Votes	%	∆%
BN	Yussof Mahal	10,471	77.04	▼0.64
Independent	Lau Seng Kiat	2,014	14.82	▲14.82
PAS	Matusin Abdul Rahman	1,106	8.14	▼14.18
Total valid votes		13,591	100.00	
Total rejected ballots		311		
Unreturned ballots		247		
Turnout		14,149	68.08	▲1.00
Registered electors		20,783		
Majority		8,457	62.22	▲6.86
BN hold		Swing		

Malaysian general election, 2004
Party	Candidate	Votes	%	∆%
BN	Suhaili Abdul Rahman	11,087	77.68	▲6.34
PAS	Matusin Abdul Rahman	3,186	22.32	▲11.50
Total valid votes		14,273	100.00	
Total rejected ballots		488		
Unreturned ballots		0		
Turnout		14,761	67.08	▲1.57
Registered electors		22,006		
Majority		7,901	55.36	▲1.86
BN hold		Swing		

Malaysian general election, 1999
Party	Candidate	Votes	%	∆%
BN	Suhaili Abdul Rahman	8,687	71.34	▲1.55
PBS	Teo Boon Heng @ Raymond	2,172	17.84	▼12.37
PAS	Asbullah Mohd. Salleh	1,318	10.82	▲10.28
Total valid votes		12,177	100.00	
Total rejected ballots		176		
Unreturned ballots		1,806		
Turnout		14,159	65.51	▼3.68
Registered electors		21,611		
Majority		6,515	53.50	▲13.92
BN hold		Swing		

Malaysian general election, 1995
Party	Candidate	Votes	%	∆%
BN	Abdol Mulok @ Mollee Awang Damit	9,076	69.79	▲10.10
PBS	Sahlih Sirin	3,929	30.21	▲30.21
Total valid votes		13,005	100.00	
Total rejected ballots		353		
Unreturned ballots		649		
Turnout		14,007	69.19	▼4.71
Registered electors		20,243		
Majority		5,147	39.58	▲9.76
BN hold		Swing		

Malaysian general election, 1990
Party	Candidate	Votes	%	∆%
BN	Abdol Mulok @ Mollee Awang Damit	7,130	59.69	▲31.68
Independent	Zaini Mohd Isa	3,568	29.87	▲29.87
Independent	Harris Annuar @ David Tan	1,248	10.45	▲10.45
Total valid votes		11,946	100.00	
Total rejected ballots		165		
Unreturned ballots		0		
Turnout		12,111	73.90	▲6.83
Registered electors		16,388		
Majority		3,562	29.82	▲27.55
BN gain from Independent		Swing		?

Malaysian general election, 1986
Party	Candidate	Votes	%
Independent	Abdol Mulok @ Mollee Awang Damit	2,448	30.28
BN	Isli Siput @ Ali	2,265	28.01
Independent	Ahmad Shah Hussein Tambakau	1,995	24.68
Independent	Abdul Ghani Mat Jair	780	9.65
BERJAYA	Mohamedian Mudzaffar @ Mohd Din Ja'far	597	7.38
Total valid votes		8,085	100.00
Total rejected ballots		78	
Unreturned ballots		0	
Turnout		8,163	67.07
Registered electors		12,171	
Majority		183	2.27
This was a new constituency created out of Hilir Padas which went to Independent in the previous election.
