= Limbawang =

Federal constituency in Sabah, Malaysia

Sabah constituency

Defunct federal constituency
- Legislature: Dewan Rakyat
- Constituency created: 1984
- Constituency abolished: 1995
- First contested: 1986
- Last contested: 1990

Limbawang was a federal constituency in Sabah, Malaysia, that was represented in the Dewan Rakyat from 1986 to 1995.

The federal constituency was created in the 1984 redistribution and was mandated to return a single member to the Dewan Rakyat under the first past the post voting system.

== History ==
It was abolished in 1995 when it was redistributed.

=== Representation history ===
Members of Parliament for Limbawang
Parliament	No	Years	Member	Party	Vote Share
Constituency created from Hilir Padas and Ulu Padas
7th	P148	1986-1987	Abdul Hamid Mustapha (عبدالحميد مصطفى)	BN (USNO)	4,240; 50.54%
7th	P148	1987-1990	Mustapha Harun (داتو مصطفى داتو هارون)	BN (USNO)	4,704; 50.62%
8th	P148	1990-1995	Mustapha Harun (داتو مصطفى داتو هارون)	BN (UMNO)	7,092; 56.41%
Constituency abolished, split into Beaufort and Sipitang

=== State constituency ===
Parliamentary constituency	State constituency					
Parliamentary constituency	1967–1974	1974–1985	1985–1995	1995–2004	2004–2020	2020–present
Limbawang			Klias			
Limbawang			Lumadan			

=== Historical boundaries ===
State Constituency	Area
State Constituency	1984
Klias	Beaufort; Kampung Nukahan; Kampung Sinuko; Klias; Limbawang
Lumadan	Padas; Pukau; Lingkungan; Lumadan; Weston

== Election results ==
Malaysian general election, 1990: Limbawang
Party	Candidate	Votes	%	∆%
BN	Mustapha Harun	7,092	56.41	▲5.79
Independent	Jusri Sahat	5,192	41.30	▲41.30
DAP	Shi Bo Nguan	288	2.29	▲2.29
Total valid votes		12,572	100.00	
Total rejected ballots		139		
Unreturned ballots		0		
Turnout		12,711	69.02	▲7.02
Registered electors		18,416		
Majority		1,900	15.11	▼4.20
BN hold		Swing		

Malaysian general by-election, 18 April 1987: Limbawang Upon the death of incumbent, Abdul Hamid Mustapha
Party	Candidate	Votes	%	∆%
BN	Mustapha Harun	4,704	50.62	▲50.62
Independent	Mohamad Lamrih @ Mohamad Ramli Mohamad Said	2,910	31.31	▲31.31
BERJAYA	Mohamad Yussof Yaakub	1,679	18.07	▲18.07
Total valid votes		9,293	100.00	
Total rejected ballots		107		
Unreturned ballots		0		
Turnout		9,400	61.98	▲5.54
Registered electors		15,165		
Majority		1,794	19.31	▼2.88
BN hold		Swing		

Malaysian general election, 1986: Limbawang
Party	Candidate	Votes	%
BN	Abdul Hamid Mustapha	4,240	50.54
Independent	Taufick Ruschi	2,378	28.35
Independent	Yusof Yacob	1,771	21.11
Total valid votes		8,389	100.00
Total rejected ballots		156	
Unreturned ballots		0	
Turnout		8,545	56.44
Registered electors		15,139	
Majority		1,862	22.19
This was a new constituency created.
