= Rozman Isli =

Malaysian politician

Yang Berbahagia Datuk Rozman Isli PMW ASDK PPN

Member of the Malaysian Parliament for Labuan
- In office 5 May 2013 – 19 November 2022
- Preceded by: Yussof Mahal (BN–UMNO)
- Succeeded by: Suhaili Abdul Rahman (PN–BERSATU)
- Majority: 6,625 (2018); 1,450 (2013)

Personal details
- Born: 28 May 1963 (age 63) Labuan, Crown Colony of North Borneo
- Citizenship: Malaysian
- Party: United Malays National Organisation (UMNO) (–2018); Heritage Party (WARISAN) (since 2018)
- Other political affiliations: Barisan Nasional (BN) (–2018)
- Parent: Isli Siput @ Mohd Ali (father)
- Occupation: Politician

Rozman Isli (born 28 May 1963) is a Malaysian politician who was the Member of Parliament (MP) for Labuan from May 2013 to November 2022. He is a member and Division Chief of Labuan of the Heritage Party (WARISAN) and was a member of the United Malays National Organisation (UMNO), a component party of the Barisan Nasional (BN) coalition. He was elected in the 2013 and 2018 general elections on the BN ticket. However, in October 2018, he left BN and UMNO for WARISAN. On 31 March 2019, he won the party position of the Labuan WARISAN Division Chief by a walkover. He also was Chairman of the Labuan Corporation Advisory Council from 2018 to 2020.

== Election results ==
Parliament of Malaysia
| Year | Constituency | Candidate | Votes | Pct | Opponent(s) | Votes | Pct | Ballots cast | Majority | Turnout |
|---|---|---|---|---|---|---|---|---|---|---|
| 2013 | P166 Labuan | Rozman Isli (UMNO) | 12,694 | 66.29% | Ibrahim Menudin (PKR) | 6,069 | 31.69% | 19,377 | 6,625 | 79.17% |
| 2013 | P166 Labuan | Rozman Isli (UMNO) | 12,694 | 66.29% | Hadnan Mohamad (PAS) | 386 | 2.02% | 19,377 | 6,625 | 79.17% |
| 2018 | P166 Labuan | Rozman Isli (UMNO) | 10,164 | 47.59% | Noor Halim Zaini (WARISAN) | 8,714 | 40.80% | 21,729 | 1,450 | 76.63% |
| 2018 | P166 Labuan | Rozman Isli (UMNO) | 10,164 | 47.59% | Ahmad Junid @ Junit Mohd Aling @ Aling (PAS) | 1,555 | 7.28% | 21,729 | 1,450 | 76.63% |
| 2018 | P166 Labuan | Rozman Isli (UMNO) | 10,164 | 47.59% | Siti Zaleha Ibrahim (PHRS) | 925 | 4.33% | 21,729 | 1,450 | 76.63% |
| 2022 | P166 Labuan | Rozman Isli (WARISAN) | 7,310 | 25.70% | Suhaili Abdul Rahman (BERSATU) | 8,124 | 28.56% | 28,449 | 708 | 63.95% |
| 2022 | P166 Labuan | Rozman Isli (WARISAN) | 7,310 | 25.70% | Bashir Alias (UMNO) | 7,416 | 26.07% | 28,449 | 708 | 63.95% |
| 2022 | P166 Labuan | Rozman Isli (WARISAN) | 7,310 | 25.70% | Ramli Tahir (AMANAH) | 5,307 | 18.65% | 28,449 | 708 | 63.95% |
| 2022 | P166 Labuan | Rozman Isli (WARISAN) | 7,310 | 25.70% | Dayang Rusimah (PBM) | 202 | 0.71% | 28,449 | 708 | 63.95% |
| 2022 | P166 Labuan | Rozman Isli (WARISAN) | 7,310 | 25.70% | Ramle Mat Daly (PEJUANG) | 90 | 0.32% | 28,449 | 708 | 63.95% |

== Honours ==
- Malaysia
  - Medal of the Order of the Defender of the Realm (PPN) (2007)
- Sabah
  - Companion of the Order of Kinabalu (ASDK) (2009)
  - Commander of the Order of the Territorial Crown (PMW) – Datuk (2014)
