= Mohamad Imran Abdul Hamid =

Malaysian politician

First Admiral (Rtd) Mohamad Imran Abdul Hamid PAT SMS PCM KAT KMN ACM AMS PPS PPA PJM
- محمد عمران بن عبدالحميد

Faction represented in Dewan Rakyat
- 2013–2018: People's Justice Party

Faction represented in Dewan Negara
- 2018–2021: Pakatan Harapan

Personal details
- Born: Mohamad Imran bin Abdul Hamid; 1953 (age 72–73)
- Citizenship: Malaysian
- Party: People's Justice Party (PKR)
- Other political affiliations: Pakatan Harapan (PH); Pakatan Rakyat (PR)
- Spouse: Che Saleha Che Abdul Rahman
- Children: 6 (1 son, 5 daughters)
- Occupation: Politician
- Profession: Senior Royal Malaysian Navy Officer

Military service
- Allegiance: Malaysia; Yang di-Pertuan Agong
- Branch/service: Royal Malaysian Navy
- Rank: First Admiral (Malay: Laksamana Pertama)
- Commands: KD Pelanduk

First Admiral (Rtd) Mohamad Imran bin Abdul Hamid (Jawi: محمد عمران بن عبدالحميد) is a Malaysian politician. He is a member of the People's Justice Party (PKR), a component party of Pakatan Harapan (PH) coalition.

Imran was the Member of Parliament (MP) for Lumut for one term from 2013 to 2018 after winning the parliamentary seat in the 2013 general election. He contested the Perak State Legislative Assembly seat of Bukit Chandan instead in the 2018 general election but lost. Later he was appointed as a Senator in the Upper House Dewan Negara of the Parliament of Malaysia for the term 27 August 2018 to 26 August 2021.

== Controversy ==
In 2019, Imran had proposed a sexual harassment law to 'protect men' from being seduced into committing sexual crimes and to 'ensure men are safe and the country is peaceful', during the debate on Syarie Legal Profession (Federal Territories) Bill 2019 at the Dewan Negara. He immediately received a lot of protest from many who were upset with his disgusting unthoughtful and insensitive suggestion including his own party, PKR's president, Anwar Ibrahim who ask him to retract his proposal. He apologised 'a million times' for his big mistake that hurts the feelings of many women and also insulted the men and retract his proposal on the next day.

== Election results ==
Parliament of Malaysia
Year	Constituency	Candidate	Votes	Pct	Opponent(s)	Votes	Pct	Ballots cast	Majority	Turnout
2013	P074 Lumut	Mohamad Imran Abdul Hamid (PKR)	40,308	55.64%	Kong Cho Ha (MCA)	32,140	44.36%	73,753	8,168	83.53%

Perak State Legislative Assembly
Year	Constituency	Candidate	Votes	Pct	Opponent(s)	Votes	Pct	Ballots cast	Majority	Turnout
2018	N34 Bukit Chandan	Mohamad Imran Abdul Hamid (PKR)	5,465	38.66%	Maslin Sham Razman (UMNO)	5,929	41.94%	14,390	464	83.13%
2018	N34 Bukit Chandan	Mohamad Imran Abdul Hamid (PKR)	5,465	38.66%	Intan Norhani Mohd Basir (PAS)	2,743	19.40%	14,390	464	83.13%

== Honours ==
- Malaysia
  - Officer of the Order of the Defender of the Realm (KMN) (1995)
  - Recipient of the Loyal Service Medal (PPS)
  - Recipient of the General Service Medal (PPA)
- Malaysian Armed Forces
  - Warrior of the Most Gallant Order of Military Service (PAT)
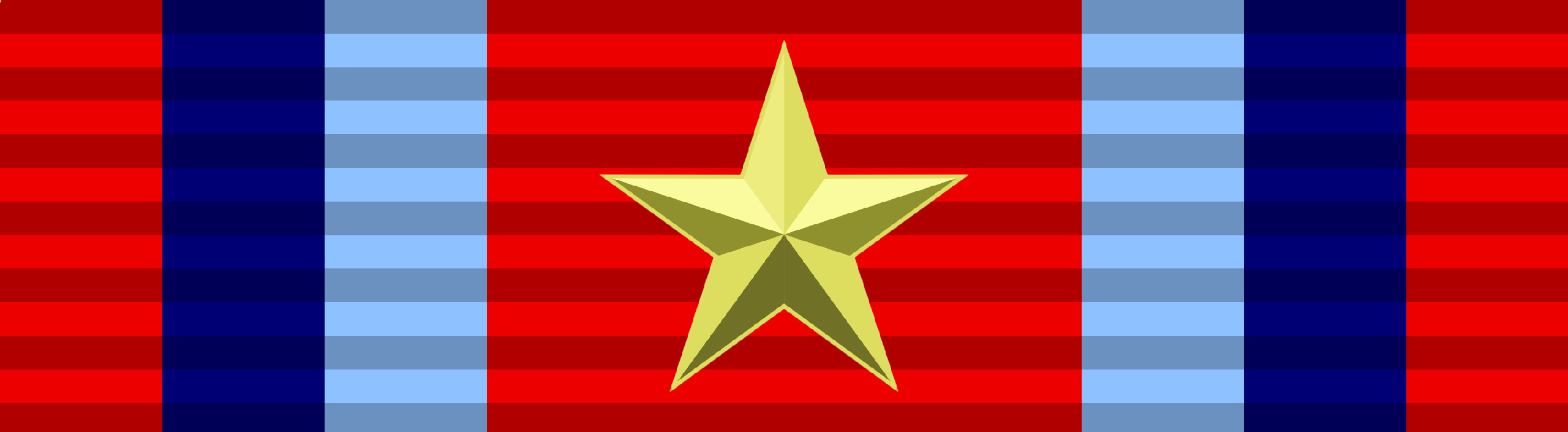
  - Officer of the Most Gallant Order of Military Service (KAT)
  - Recipient of the Malaysian Service Medal (PJM)
- Perak
  - Commander of the Order of Cura Si Manja Kini (PCM) (2003)
  - Member of the Order of Cura Si Manja Kini (ACM) (2001)
- Selangor
  - Companion of the Order of the Crown of Selangor (SMS) (2006)
  - Member of the Order of the Crown of Selangor (AMS) (1997)

== See also ==
- Lumut (federal constituency)
- List of people who have served in both Houses of the Malaysian Parliament
