= Iskandar Dzulkarnain Abdul Khalid =

Malaysian politician

Yang Berhormat Dato' Iskandar Dzulkarnain Abdul Khalid DIMP PMW MP
- إسكندر ذوالقرنين عبد الخالد

Member of the Malaysian Parliament for Kuala Kangsar
- Incumbent
- Assumed office 19 November 2022
- Preceded by: Mastura Mohd Yazid (BN–UMNO)
- Majority: 3,566 (2022)

Senator Elected by the Perak State Legislative Assembly
- In office 20 December 2021 – 5 November 2022 Serving with Shamsuddin Abdul Ghafar
- Monarch: Abdullah
- Prime Minister: Ismail Sabri Yaakob
- Preceded by: Ismail Yusop & Nga Hock Cheh
- Succeeded by: Mujahid Yusof Rawa

Personal details
- Born: 2 November 1976 (age 49)
- Party: Malaysian United Indigenous Party (BERSATU) (2018–2024); Independent (2024–present)
- Other political affiliations: Pakatan Harapan (PH) (2018–2020); Perikatan Nasional (PN) (2020–2024)
- Education: Edith Cowan University

Iskandar Dzulkarnain bin Abdul Khalid is a Malaysian politician who has served as the Member of Parliament (MP) for Kuala Kangsar since November 2022 and had served as a Senator from 2021 until 2022. He was a member of the Malaysian United Indigenous Party (BERSATU), a component party of the Perikatan Nasional (PN) coalition. Currently, he is an independent politician since his BERSATU membership ended on 12 June 2024.

== Political career ==
He was elected as Senator to represent Perak State Legislative Assembly for the 2021 to 2024 parliamentary tenure, but he resigned to contest in the 2022 Malaysian general election. He was also the Political Secretary of former Menteri Besar of Perak, Ahmad Faizal Azumu, He also became a member of the BERSATU Supreme Leadership Council on 23 August 2020 following the annual general election for the 2019 to 2022 tenure.

On 12 October 2023 Iskandar Dzulkarnain declared his support on current government led by Prime Minister Anwar Ibrahim. However, he is still loyal to his own party, BERSATU. He stated that the move is to ease the burden faced by his constituents over the rising cost of living.

== Election results ==
Parliament of Malaysia
Year	Constituency	Candidate	Votes	Pct	Opponent(s)	Votes	Pct	Ballots cast	Majority	Turnout
2022	P067 Kuala Kangsar	Iskandar Dzulkarnain Abdul Khalid (BERSATU)	14,380	40.22%	Maslin Sham Razman (UMNO)	10,814	30.25%	36,232	3,566	77.11%
2022	P067 Kuala Kangsar	Iskandar Dzulkarnain Abdul Khalid (BERSATU)	14,380	40.22%	Ahmad Termizi Ramli (AMANAH)	10,356	28.96%	36,232	3,566	77.11%
2022	P067 Kuala Kangsar	Iskandar Dzulkarnain Abdul Khalid (BERSATU)	14,380	40.22%	Yusmalia Mohamad Yusof (PEJUANG)	204	0.57%	36,232	3,566	77.11%

== Honours ==
=== Honours of Malaysia ===
- Malaysia
  - Recipient of the 17th Yang di-Pertuan Agong Installation Medal
- Federal Territory (Malaysia)
  - Commander of the Order of the Territorial Crown (PMW) – Datuk (2022)
- Pahang
  - Knight Companion of the Order of the Crown of Pahang (DIMP) – Dato' (2014)
