= Kuala Kangsar (federal constituency) =

Federal constituency in Perak, Malaysia

Kuala Kangsar (P067)
Perak constituency

Federal constituency
- Legislature: Dewan Rakyat
- MP: Iskandar Dzulkarnain Abdul Khalid; Independent
- Constituency created: 1958
- First contested: 1959
- Last contested: 2022

Demographics
- Population (2020): 51,789
- Electors (2022): 46,985
- Area (km²): 576
- Pop. density (per km²): 89.9

Kuala Kangsar is a federal constituency in Kuala Kangsar District, Perak, Malaysia, that has been represented in the Dewan Rakyat since 1959.

The federal constituency was created in the 1958 redistribution and is mandated to return a single member to the Dewan Rakyat under the first past the post voting system.

== Demographics ==
Ethnic breakdown of Kuala Kangsar's electorate as of 2022
1. Malay (71.6%)
2. Chinese (21.0%)
3. Indian (6.40%)
4. Other ethnicities (1.00%)

As of 2020, Kuala Kangsar has a population of 51,789 people.

Age breakdown of Kuala Kangsar's electorate as of 2022
1. 18–20 (5.35%)
2. 21–29 (19.7%)
3. 30–39 (21.9%)
4. 40–49 (17.3%)
5. 50–59 (14.2%)
6. 60–69 (12.0%)
7. 70–79 (6.28%)
8. 80–89 (2.17%)
9. above 90 (0.62%)
Gender breakdown of Kuala Kangsar's electorate as of 2022
1. Male (49.4%)
2. Female (50.6%)

== History ==
=== Polling districts ===
According to the federal gazette issued on 31 October 2022, the Kuala Kangsar constituency is divided into 26 polling districts.

State constituency	Polling Districts	Code	Location
Bukit Chandan (N34）	Kampong Talang	067/34/01	SMJK Tsung Wah
Bukit Chandan (N34）	Jalan Dato Sagor	067/34/02	SMJK Tsung Wah
Bukit Chandan (N34）	Jalan Kangsar	067/34/03	SMK Clifford
Bukit Chandan (N34）	Kampong Pajak Potong	067/34/04	SJK (C) Tsung Wah
Bukit Chandan (N34）	Bukit Resident	067/34/05	SMK Raja Perempuan Kelsom
Bukit Chandan (N34）	Bukit Chandan	067/34/06	SK Raja Perempuan Muzwin
Bukit Chandan (N34）	Jalan Datoh	067/34/07	SJK (C) Tsung Wah
Bukit Chandan (N34）	Kampng Sayong Lembah	067/34/08	SMK Sayong
Bukit Chandan (N34）	Bendang Kering	067/34/09	SK Bendang Kering
Bukit Chandan (N34）	Menora	067/34/10	SK Menora
Bukit Chandan (N34）	Senggang	067/34/11	SK Senggang
Bukit Chandan (N34）	Seberang Manong	067/34/12	SRA Rakyat Insaniah
Bukit Chandan (N34）	Bekor	067/34/13	SK Bekor
Manong (N35)	Taman Bunga Raya	067/35/01	SRA Rakyat Nurul Islamiah
Manong (N35)	Talang Hulu	067/35/02	SK Talang
Manong (N35)	Jalan Baharu	067/35/03	SMK Raja Muda Musa
Manong (N35)	Bendang Panjang	067/35/04	SRA Rakyat Ummul Khairiah
Manong (N35)	Jerlun	067/35/05	SJK (C) Jerlun
Manong (N35)	Kampong Mesjid	067/35/06	SK Sultan Abdul Aziz
Manong (N35)	Kampong Ketior	067/35/07	SK Sultan Abdul Aziz
Manong (N35)	Ulu Kenas	067/35/08	SK Ulu Kenas
Manong (N35)	Lempor	067/35/09	SK Lempor
Manong (N35)	Kampong Jeliang	067/35/10	SK Jeliang
Manong (N35)	Manong	067/35/11	SK Manong
Manong (N35)	Kampong Semat	067/35/12	Dewan Orang Ramai Kampong Semat
Manong (N35)	Ulu Piol	067/35/13	SK Ulu Piol

=== Representation history ===
Members of Parliament for Kuala Kangsar
Parliament	No	Years	Member	Party	Vote Share
Constituency created from Sungei Perak Ulu
Parliament of the Federation of Malaya
1st	P047	1959–1963	Abdullah Abdul Raof (عبدالله عبدالرااوف)	Alliance (UMNO)	8,367; 44.68%
Parliament of Malaysia
1st	P047	1963–1964	Abdullah Abdul Raof (عبدالله عبدالرااوف)	Alliance (UMNO)	8,367; 44.68%
2nd	P047	1964–1969	Megat Khas Megat Omar (مڬت خاص مڬت عمر)	Alliance (UMNO)	11,309; 50.46%
		1969–1971	Parliament was suspended		
3rd	P047	1971–1973	Mohamed Ghazali Jawi (محمد غزالي جاوي)	Alliance (UMNO)	12,580; 57.99%
3rd	P047	1973–1974	Mohamed Ghazali Jawi (محمد غزالي جاوي)	BN (UMNO)	12,580; 57.99%
4th	P052	1974–1978	Oon Zariah Abu Bakar (اون زاريه ابو بكر)	BN (UMNO)	9,063; 62.91%
5th	P052	1978–1982	Yong Fatimah Mohd. Razali (يوڠ فاطمه محمد. غزالي)	BN (UMNO)	9,059; 52.55%
6th	P052	1982–1986	Rafidah Aziz (رفيدة بنت عزيز)	BN (UMNO)	12,159; 65.27%
7th	P061	1986–1990	Rafidah Aziz (رفيدة بنت عزيز)	BN (UMNO)	16,196; 71.05%
8th	P061	1990–1995	Rafidah Aziz (رفيدة بنت عزيز)	BN (UMNO)	16,548; 65.92%
9th	P064	1995–1999	Rafidah Aziz (رفيدة بنت عزيز)	BN (UMNO)	15,393; 76.44%
10th	P064	1999–2004	Rafidah Aziz (رفيدة بنت عزيز)	BN (UMNO)	12,074; 56.49%
11th	P067	2004–2008	Rafidah Aziz (رفيدة بنت عزيز)	BN (UMNO)	12,938; 65.73%
12th	P067	2008–2013	Rafidah Aziz (رفيدة بنت عزيز)	BN (UMNO)	10,735; 53.64%
13th	P067	2013–2016	Wan Mohammad Khair-il Anuar Wan Ahmad (وان محمد خيرالأنور وان أحمد)	BN (UMNO)	14,218; 51.14%
13th	P067	2016–2018	Mastura Mohd Yazid (مستورة بنت محمد يزيد)	BN (UMNO)	12,653; 54.37%
14th	P067	2018–2022	Mastura Mohd Yazid (مستورة بنت محمد يزيد)	BN (UMNO)	12,102; 40.26%
15th	P067	2022–2024	Iskandar Dzulkarnain Abdul Khalid (إسكندر ذلكرناءين عبدالخالد)	PN (BERSATU)	14,380; 40.22%
15th	P067	2024–present	Iskandar Dzulkarnain Abdul Khalid (إسكندر ذلكرناءين عبدالخالد)	Independent	14,380; 40.22%

=== State constituency ===
Parliamentary constituency	State constituency						
Parliamentary constituency	1955–1959*	1959–1974	1974–1986	1986–1995	1995–2004	2004–2018	2018–present
Kuala Kangsar				Batu Hampar			
Kuala Kangsar			Bukit Chandan				
Kuala Kangsar			Manong		Manong		
Kuala Kangsar		Padang Rengas					
Kuala Kangsar		Senggang					

=== Historical boundaries ===
State Constituency	Area					
State Constituency	1959	1974	1984	1994	2003	2018
Batu Hampar			Jerlun; Kampung Ketiong Luar; Kampung Simpang Tiga; Kampung Sungai Nyior; Kampung Ulu Kenas			
Bukit Chandan		Bukit Chandan; Jerlun; Kota Lama Kiri; Kuala Kangsar; Talang	Bekor; Bukit Chandan; Kampung Chopin; Kampung Simpang Tiga; Senggang	Bekor; Bukit Chandan; Kampung Chopin; Kuala Kangsar; Senggang	Bekor; Bukit Chandan; Kampung Sayong; Kuala Kangsar; Senggang	
Manong		Jerlun; Kampung Ketiong Luar; Kampung Simpang Tiga; Kampung Ulu Kenas; Manong		Jerlun; Kampung Ketiong Luar; Kampung Simpang Tiga; Kampung Ulu Kenas; Manong	Jerlun; Kampung Ketiong Luar; Kampung Ulu Kenas; Manong; Talang	
Padang Rengas	Kampung Changkat Gohor; Kampung Lempor; Kota Lama Kiri; Lubok Merbau; Padang Rengas					
Senggang	Jerlun; Kampung Simpang Tiga; Kampung Ulu Kenas; Kuala Kangsar; Manong					

=== Current state assembly members ===
No.	State Constituency	Member	Coalition (Party)
N34	Bukit Chandan	Hashim Bujang	PN (BERSATU)
N35	Manong	Burhanuddin Ahmad	PN (PAS)

=== Local governments & postcodes ===
No.	State Constituency	Local Government	Postcode
N34	Bukit Chandan	Kuala Kangsar Municipal Council	32800 Parit; 33000, 33010, 33040 Kuala Kangsar; 33700 Padang Rengas; 33800 Manong
N35	Manong	Kuala Kangsar Municipal Council	32800 Parit; 33000, 33010, 33040 Kuala Kangsar; 33700 Padang Rengas; 33800 Manong

== Election results ==
Malaysian general election, 2022
Party	Candidate	Votes	%	∆%
PN	Iskandar Dzulkarnain Abdul Khalid	14,380	40.22	▲40.22
BN	Maslin Sham Razman	10,814	30.25	▼10.01
PH	Ahmad Termizi Ramli	10,356	28.96	▲28.96
PEJUANG	Yusmalia Mohamad Yusof	204	0.57	▲0.57
Total valid votes		35,754	100.00	
Total rejected ballots		443		
Unreturned ballots		35		
Turnout		36,232	77.11	▼7.97
Registered electors		46,985		
Majority		3,566	9.97	▲7.54
PN gain from BN		Swing		?
Source(s) https://lom.agc.gov.my/ilims/upload/portal/akta/outputp/1753277/PUB610%20PARLIMEN%20PERAK.pdf

Malaysian general election, 2018
Party	Candidate	Votes	%	∆%
BN	Mastura Mohd Yazid	12,102	40.26	▼14.11
PKR	Ahmad Termizi Ramli	11,371	37.83	▲37.83
PAS	Khalil Idham Lim Abdullah	6,583	21.90	▼2.52
Total valid votes		30,056	100.00	
Total rejected ballots		511		
Unreturned ballots		134		
Turnout		30,701	83.08	▲11.69
Registered electors		36,954		
Majority		731	2.43	▼27.52
BN hold		Swing		
Source(s) "His Majesty's Government Gazette - Notice of Contested Election, Parliament for the State of Perak [P.U. (B) 237/2018]" (PDF). Attorney General's Chambers of Malaysia. 3 May 2018. "Federal Government Gazette - Results of Contested Election and Statements of the Poll after the Official Addition of Votes, Parliamentary Constituencies for the State of Perak [P.U. (B) 311/2018]" (PDF). Attorney General's Chambers of Malaysia. 28 May 2018.

Malaysian general by-election, 18 June 2016 The by-election was called due to the death of incumbent, Wan Mohammad Khair-il Anuar Wan Ahmad.
Party	Candidate	Votes	%	∆%
BN	Mastura Mohd Yazid	12,653	54.37	▲3.23
PAS	Najihatussalehah Ahmad	5,684	24.42	▼22.83
Amanah	Ahmad Termizi Ramli	4,883	20.98	▲20.98
Independent	Izat Bukhary Ismail Bukhary	54	0.23	▲0.23
Total valid votes		23,274	100.00	
Total rejected ballots		239		
Unreturned ballots		10		
Turnout		23,523	71.39	▲12.94
Registered electors		32,949		
Majority		6,969	29.95	▲26.06
BN hold		Swing		
Source(s) "Pilihan Raya Kecil P.067 Kuala Kangsar". Election Commission of Malaysia. Archived from the original on 2018-09-19. "Federal Government Gazette - Notice of Contested Election - By-election of the Dewan Rakyat of P.067 Kuala Kangsar for the State of Perak [P.U. (B) 271/2016]" (PDF). Attorney General's Chambers of Malaysia. 6 June 2016. Archived from the original (PDF) on 2017-06-13. "Federal Government Gazette - Results of Contested Election and Statement of the Poll after the Official Addition of Votes for the By-election of P.067 Kuala Kangsar [P. U. (B) 298/2016]" (PDF). Attorney General's Chambers of Malaysia. 23 June 2016. Archived from the original (PDF) on 2017-03-27.

Malaysian general election, 2013
Party	Candidate	Votes	%	∆%
BN	Wan Mohammad Khair-il Anuar Wan Ahmad	14,218	51.14	▼2.50
PAS	Khalil Idham Lim Abdullah	13,136	47.25	▲0.89
Independent	Kamilia Ibrahim	447	1.61	▲1.61
Total valid votes		27,801	100.00	
Total rejected ballots		407		
Unreturned ballots		75		
Turnout		28,283	84.33	▲10.99
Registered electors		33,540		
Majority		1,082	3.89	▼6.39
BN hold		Swing		
Source(s) "Federal Government Gazette - Notice of Contested Election, Parliament for the State of Perak [P.U. (B) 174/2013]" (PDF). Attorney General's Chambers of Malaysia. 26 April 2013. Archived from the original (PDF) on 2019-12-29. "Federal Government Gazette - Results of Contested Election and Statements of the Poll after the Official Addition of Votes, Parliamentary Constituencies for the State of Perak [P.U. (B) 215/2013]" (PDF). Attorney General's Chambers of Malaysia. 22 May 2013.

Malaysian general election, 2008
Party	Candidate	Votes	%	∆%
BN	Rafidah Aziz	10,735	53.64	▼12.09
PAS	Khairuddin Abd Malik	9,277	46.36	▲12.09
Total valid votes		20,012	100.00	
Total rejected ballots		373		
Unreturned ballots		388		
Turnout		20,773	73.34	▲2.25
Registered electors		28,325		
Majority		1,458	10.28	▼21.18
BN hold		Swing		

Malaysian general election, 2004
Party	Candidate	Votes	%	∆%
BN	Rafidah Aziz	12,938	65.73	▲9.24
PAS	Mohammad Nizar Jamaluddin	6,747	34.27	▼9.24
Total valid votes		19,685	100.00	
Total rejected ballots		373		
Unreturned ballots		126		
Turnout		20,184	71.09	▲6.40
Registered electors		28,392		
Majority		6,191	31.46	▲18.48
BN hold		Swing		

Malaysian general election, 1999
Party	Candidate	Votes	%	∆%
BN	Rafidah Aziz	12,074	56.49	▼19.95
PAS	Asmuni Awi	9,300	43.51	▲43.51
Total valid votes		21,374	100.00	
Total rejected ballots		434		
Unreturned ballots		78		
Turnout		21,886	64.69	▼0.87
Registered electors		33,832		
Majority		2,774	12.98	▼39.90
BN hold		Swing		

Malaysian general election, 1995
Party	Candidate	Votes	%	∆%
BN	Rafidah Aziz	15,393	76.44	▲10.52
S46	Abdul Khalid Mohd. Nasir	4,744	23.56	▼10.52
Total valid votes		20,137	100.00	
Total rejected ballots		736		
Unreturned ballots		116		
Turnout		20,989	65.56	▼3.28
Registered electors		32,014		
Majority		10,649	52.88	▲21.04
BN hold		Swing		

Malaysian general election, 1990
Party	Candidate	Votes	%	∆%
BN	Rafidah Aziz	16,548	65.92	▼5.13
S46	Jamaluddin Mohd Din	8,554	34.08	▲34.08
Total valid votes		25,102	100.00	
Total rejected ballots		824		
Unreturned ballots		0		
Turnout		25,926	68.84	▲4.90
Registered electors		37,659		
Majority		7,994	31.84	▼10.26
BN hold		Swing		

Malaysian general election, 1986
Party	Candidate	Votes	%	∆%
BN	Rafidah Aziz	16,196	71.05	▲5.78
PAS	Ab Aziz Ishak	6,598	28.95	▲13.56
Total valid votes		22,794	100.00	
Total rejected ballots		658		
Unreturned ballots		0		
Turnout		23,452	63.94	▼8.25
Registered electors		36,681		
Majority		9,598	42.10	▲3.83
BN hold		Swing		

Malaysian general election, 1982
Party	Candidate	Votes	%	∆%
BN	Rafidah Aziz	12,159	65.27	▲12.72
DAP	Harikrishnan Vallappan	3,603	19.34	▼5.38
PAS	Muhammad Harun	2,867	15.39	▼7.34
Total valid votes		18,629	100.00	
Total rejected ballots		527		
Unreturned ballots		0		
Turnout		19,156	72.19	▼2.24
Registered electors		26,535		
Majority		8,556	45.93	▲18.10
BN hold		Swing		

Malaysian general election, 1978
Party	Candidate	Votes	%	∆%
BN	Yong Fatimah Mohd. Razali	9,059	52.55	▼10.36
DAP	Kok Kean Fatt @ Chin Ken Fatt	4,261	24.72	▼1.84
PAS	Baharuddin Abdul Latif	3,919	22.73	▲22.73
Total valid votes		17,239	100.00	
Total rejected ballots		592		
Unreturned ballots		0		
Turnout		17,831	74.43	▲5.65
Registered electors		23,958		
Majority		4,798	27.83	▼8.52
BN hold		Swing		

Malaysian general election, 1974
Party	Candidate	Votes	%	∆%
BN	Oon Zariah Abu Bakar	9,063	62.91	▲62.91
DAP	Kok Kean Fatt @ Chin Ken Fatt	3,826	26.56	▲26.56
PEKEMAS	Abdul Raffor Abdul Hamid	1,517	10.53	▲10.53
Total valid votes		14,406	100.00	
Total rejected ballots		532		
Unreturned ballots		0		
Turnout		14,938	68.78	▼1.62
Registered electors		21,720		
Majority		5,237	36.35	▲20.37
BN gain from Alliance		Swing		?

Malaysian general election, 1969
Party	Candidate	Votes	%	∆%
Alliance	Mohamed Ghazali Jawi	12,580	57.99	▲7.53
PMIP	Abdul Mutalib Mohd Tahir	9,113	42.01	▲19.08
Total valid votes		21,693	100.00	
Total rejected ballots		1,587		
Unreturned ballots		0		
Turnout		23,280	70.40	▼7.92
Registered electors		33,067		
Majority		3,467	15.98	▼11.55
Alliance hold		Swing		

Malaysian general election, 1964
Party	Candidate	Votes	%	∆%
Alliance	Megat Khas Megat Omar	11,309	50.46	▲5.78
PMIP	Ahmad Zawawi Ibrahim	5,139	22.93	▼6.87
Socialist Front	Fathil Khalid	3,028	13.51	▲13.51
Independent	S. Underwood	2,209	9.86	▲9.86
UDP	Syed Osman Jamalullail	725	3.24	▲3.24
Total valid votes		22,410	100.00	
Total rejected ballots		863		
Unreturned ballots		0		
Turnout		23,273	78.32	▲7.01
Registered electors		29,714		
Majority		6,170	27.53	▲12.65
Alliance hold		Swing		

Malaysian general election, 1959
Party	Candidate	Votes	%
Alliance	Abdullah Abdul Raof	8,367	44.68
PMIP	Syed Nordin Husein	5,581	29.80
Socialist Front	Omar Nordin	4,780	25.52
Total valid votes		18,728	100.00
Total rejected ballots		146	
Unreturned ballots		0	
Turnout		18,874	71.31
Registered electors		26,466	
Majority		2,786	14.88
This was a new constituency created.
