= Microflex =

Microflex Corporation is an American manufacturer of disposable gloves. It was founded in 1987 in San Francisco. In 1995, the company moved its headquarters to Reno, Nevada.

Microflex products are used across a broad variety of industries, including Healthcare, Laboratory, Dental, Automotive, Emergency Medical Services and Food Service.

It is a subsidiary of BarrierSafe Solutions International. Microflex was acquired by Ansell in 2013.
