= Maslin Sham Razman =

Malaysian politician

Yang Berbahagia Datuk Maslin Sham Razman PMW PMP AMP KMN
- مسلين شام رزمن

Member of the Perak State Legislative Assembly for Bukit Chandan
- In office 5 May 2013 – 19 November 2022
- Preceded by: Wan Mohammad Khair-il Anuar (BN–UMNO)
- Succeeded by: Hashim Bujang (PN–BERSATU)
- Majority: 959 (2013); 464 (2018)

Personal details
- Born: Maslin Sham bin Razman
- Citizenship: Malaysian
- Party: UMNO
- Other political affiliations: Barisan Nasional
- Spouse: Faridah Kamaruddin
- Education: Universiti Utara Malaysia
- Occupation: Civil engineer Businessman; Politician

Maslin Sham bin Razman is a Malaysian politician from UMNO. He is the Member of Perak State Legislative Assembly for Bukit Chandan from 2013 to November 2022.

== Early career ==
He was a Director of a computer software company before joining politics.

== Political career ==
He is the Chief of UMNO Kuala Kangsar branch and Deputy Chairman of KSK Parlimen Kuala Kangsar.

== Election results ==
Perak State Legislative Assembly
Year	Constituency	Candidate	Votes	Pct	Opponent(s)	Votes	Pct	Ballots cast	Majority	Turnout
2013	N34 Bukit Chandan	Maslin Sham Razman (UMNO)	7,050	52.33%	Fathmawaty Salim (PKR)	6,091	45.21%	13,471	959	84.30%
2013	N34 Bukit Chandan	Maslin Sham Razman (UMNO)	7,050	52.33%	Jahiddin Isa (IND)	55	0.41%	13,471	959	84.30%
2018	N34 Bukit Chandan	Maslin Sham Razman (UMNO)	5,929	34.25%	Mohamad Imran Abdul Hamid (PKR)	5,465	31.57%	14,882	464	85.97%
2018	N34 Bukit Chandan	Maslin Sham Razman (UMNO)	5,929	34.25%	Intan Norhani Mohamad Basir (PAS)	2,743	15.85%	14,882	464	85.97%

Parliament of Malaysia
Year	Constituency	Candidate	Votes	Pct	Opponent(s)	Votes	Pct	Ballots cast	Majority	Turnout
2022	P067 Kuala Kangsar	Maslin Sham Razman (UMNO)	10,814	30.25%	Iskandar Dzulkarnain Abdul Khalid (BERSATU)	14,380	30.25%	36,232	3,566	77.11%
2022	P067 Kuala Kangsar	Maslin Sham Razman (UMNO)	10,814	30.25%	Ahmad Termizi Ramli (AMANAH)	10,356	28.96%	36,232	3,566	77.11%
2022	P067 Kuala Kangsar	Maslin Sham Razman (UMNO)	10,814	30.25%	Yusmalia Mohamad Yusof (PEJUANG)	204	0.57%	36,232	3,566	77.11%

== Honours ==
- Malaysia
  - Officer of the Order of the Defender of the Realm (KMN) (2015)
- Federal Territory (Malaysia)
  - Commander of the Order of the Territorial Crown (PMW) – Datuk (2022)
- Perak
  - Commander of the Order of the Perak State Crown (PMP) (2012)
  - Member of the Order of the Perak State Crown (AMP) (2009)
