= Bukit Chandan =

State constituency in Perak, Malaysia

Bukit Chandan (N34)
Perak constituency

State constituency
- Legislature: Perak State Legislative Assembly
MLA
Hashim Bujang
PN
- Constituency created: 1974
- First contested: 1974
- Last contested: 2022

Demographics
- Electors (2022): 22,194

Bukit Chandan is a state constituency in Perak, Malaysia, that has been represented in the Perak State Legislative Assembly since 1974.

The state constituency was created in the 1974 redistribution and is mandated to return a single member to the Perak State Legislative Assembly under the first past the post voting system.

== Demographics ==
Ethnic breakdown of Bukit Chandan's electorate as of 2022
1. Malay (68.9%)
2. Chinese (21.5%)
3. Indian (6.33%)
4. Other ethnicities (3.20%)

== History ==
2004–2016: The constituency contains the polling districts of Jalan Kangsar, Jalan Datoh, Jalan Dato Sagor, Kampong Talang, Kampong Pajak Potong, Kampong Sayong Lembah, Bukit Resident, Bukit Chandan, Bendang Kering, Menora, Senggang, Seberang Manong, Bekor.

2016–present: The constituency contains the polling districts of Jalan Kangsar, Jalan Datoh, Jalan Dato Sagor, Kampong Talang, Kampong Pajak Potong, Kampong Sayong Lembah, Bukit Resident, Bukit Chandan, Bendang Kering, Menora, Senggang, Seberang Manong, Bekor.

=== Polling districts ===
According to the federal gazette issued on 31 October 2022, the Bukit Chandan constituency is divided into 13 polling districts.

State constituency	Polling Districts	Code	Location
Bukit Chandan (N34）	Kampong Talang	067/34/01	SMJK Tsung Wah
Bukit Chandan (N34）	Jalan Dato Sagor	067/34/02	SMJK Tsung Wah
Bukit Chandan (N34）	Jalan Kangsar	067/34/03	SMK Clifford
Bukit Chandan (N34）	Kampong Pajak Potong	067/34/04	SJK (C) Tsung Wah
Bukit Chandan (N34）	Bukit Resident	067/34/05	SMK Raja Perempuan Kelsom
Bukit Chandan (N34）	Bukit Chandan	067/34/06	SK Raja Perempuan Muzwin
Bukit Chandan (N34）	Jalan Datoh	067/34/07	SJK (C) Tsung Wah
Bukit Chandan (N34）	Kampng Sayong Lembah	067/34/08	SMK Sayong
Bukit Chandan (N34）	Bendang Kering	067/34/09	SK Bendang Kering
Bukit Chandan (N34）	Menora	067/34/10	SK Menora
Bukit Chandan (N34）	Senggang	067/34/11	SK Senggang
Bukit Chandan (N34）	Seberang Manong	067/34/12	SRA Rakyat Insaniah
Bukit Chandan (N34）	Bekor	067/34/13	SK Bekor

=== Representation history ===
Members of the Legislative Assembly for Bukit Chandan
Assembly	No	Years	Member	Party
Constituency created from Senggang and Padang Renggas
4th	N17	1974-1978	Ahmad Zainal	BN (UMNO)
5th	N17	1978-1982	Wong Yee Kao (黃意高)	BN (MCA)
6th	N17	1982-1986	Shaari Mohamed Noor	BN (UMNO)
7th	N25	1986-1990	Megat Tajuddin Megat Ahmad	BN (UMNO)
8th	N25	1990-1995	Megat Tajuddin Megat Ahmad	BN (UMNO)
9th	N29	1995-1999	Ahmad Jaafar	BN (UMNO)
10th	N29	1999-2004	Ahmad Jaafar	BN (UMNO)
11th	N34	2004-2008	Ahmad Jaafar	BN (UMNO)
12th	N34	2008-2013	Wan Mohammad Khair-il Anuar Wan Ahmad	BN (UMNO)
13th	N34	2013-2018	Maslin Sham Razman	BN (UMNO)
14th	N34	2018-2022	Maslin Sham Razman	BN (UMNO)
15th	N34	2022–present	Hashim Bujang	PN (BERSATU)

== Election results ==
Perak state election, 2022: Bukit Chandan
Party	Candidate	Votes	%	∆%
PN	Hashim Bujang	6,550	38.43	▲38.43
BN	Azizul Rahim	5,386	31.60	▼10.34
PH	Amir Sabri	5,108	29.97	▲29.97
Total valid votes		17,044	100.00	
Total rejected ballots		211		
Unreturned ballots		36		
Turnout		17,291	77.91	▼8.06
Registered electors		22,194		
Majority		1,164	6.83	▲3.55
PN gain from BN		Swing		?

Perak state election, 2018: Bukit Chandan
Party	Candidate	Votes	%	∆%
BN	Maslin Sham Razman	5,929	41.94	▼11.49
PKR	Mohamad Imran Abdul Hamid	5,465	38.66	▲38.66
PAS	Intan Norhani Mohamad Basir	2,743	19.40	▲19.40
Total valid votes		14,137	98.24	
Total rejected ballots		253	1.46	
Unreturned ballots		492	2.84	
Turnout		14,882	85.97	▲1.67
Registered electors		17,311		
Majority		464	3.28	▼3.99
BN hold		Swing		
Source(s) "RESULTS OF CONTESTED ELECTION AND STATEMENTS OF THE POLL AFTER THE OFFICIAL ADDITION OF VOTES".

Perak state election, 2013: Bukit Chandan
Party	Candidate	Votes	%	∆%
BN	Maslin Sham Razman	7,050	53.43	▼5.03
PKR	Fathmawaty Salim	6,091	46.16	▲4.62
Independent	Jahiddin Isa	55	0.42	▲0.42
Total valid votes		13,196	97.96	
Total rejected ballots		238	1.77	
Unreturned ballots		37	0.27	
Turnout		13,471	84.30	▲10.29
Registered electors		15,979		
Majority		959	7.27	▼9.65
BN hold		Swing		
Source(s) "Federal Government Gazette - Notice of Contested Election, State Legislative Assembly for the State of Perak [P.U. (B) 190/2013]" (PDF). Attorney General's Chambers of Malaysia. 26 April 2013. "Federal Government Gazette - Results of Contested Election and Statements of the Poll after the Official Addition of Votes, State Constituencies for the State of Perak [P.U. (B) 231/2013]" (PDF). Attorney General's Chambers of Malaysia. 22 May 2013.

Perak state election, 2008: Bukit Chandan
Party	Candidate	Votes	%	∆%
BN	Wan Mohammad Khair-il Anuar Wan Ahmad	5,850	58.46	▼9.53
PKR	Zulkifly Ibrahim	4,156	41.54	▲9.53
Total valid votes		10,006	95.13	
Total rejected ballots		178	1.69	
Unreturned ballots		334	3.18	
Turnout		10,518	74.01	▲2.82
Registered electors		14,211		
Majority		1,694	16.92	▼19.06
BN hold		Swing		

Perak state election, 2004: Bukit Chandan
Party	Candidate	Votes	%	∆%
BN	Ahmad Jaafar	6,826	67.99	▲10.69
PKR	Mustaffa Kamil Ayub	3,213	32.01	▼10.69
Total valid votes		10,039	97.57	
Total rejected ballots		227	2.21	
Unreturned ballots		23	0.22	
Turnout		10,289	71.19	▲8.38
Registered electors		14,452		
Majority		3,613	35.98	▲21.38
BN hold		Swing		

Perak state election, 1999: Bukit Chandan
Party	Candidate	Votes	%	∆%
BN	Ahmad Jaafar	6,016	57.30	▼21.10
PKR	Che Mat Padali	4,483	42.70	▲21.10
Total valid votes		10,499	97.29	
Total rejected ballots		256	2.37	
Unreturned ballots		37	0.34	
Turnout		10,792	63.81	▼0.59
Registered electors		16,914		
Majority		1,533	14.60	▲42.20
BN hold		Swing		

Perak state election, 1995: Bukit Chandan
Party	Candidate	Votes	%	∆%
BN	Ahmad Jaafar	8,123	78.40	▲17.72
S46	Yahya Kamaruzzaman	2,238	21.60	▼17.72
Total valid votes		10,361	96.93	
Total rejected ballots		256	2.39	
Unreturned ballots		72	0.67	
Turnout		10,689	64.40	▼1.81
Registered electors		16,599		
Majority		5,885	56.80	▲35.75
BN hold		Swing		

Perak state election, 1990: Bukit Chandan
Party	Candidate	Votes	%	∆%
BN	Megat Tajuddin Megat Ahmad	7,844	60.68	▼8.73
S46	Mohd Noor Othman	5,149	39.63	▲39.63
Total valid votes		12,993	96.37	
Total rejected ballots		490	3.63	
Unreturned ballots		0	0.00	
Turnout		13,483	66.21	▲2.87
Registered electors		20,364		
Majority		2,695	21.05	▼17.77
BN hold		Swing		

Perak state election, 1986: Bukit Chandan
Party	Candidate	Votes	%	∆%
BN	Megat Tajuddin Megat Ahmad	8,337	69.41	▲10.62
PAS	Mohd Nor @ Md Noor Abdullah	3,675	30.59	▲17.17
Total valid votes		12,012	97.07	
Total rejected ballots		363	2.93	
Unreturned ballots		0		
Turnout		12,375	63.34	▼7.14
Registered electors		19,537		
Majority		4,662	38.82	▲7.82
BN hold		Swing		

Perak state election, 1982: Bukit Chandan
Party	Candidate	Votes	%	∆%
BN	Shaari Mohamed Noor	7,268	58.79	▲11.92
DAP	Fong Chee Wee	3,435	27.79	▼0.14
PAS	Hashim Mat Noor	1,659	13.42	▲11.81
Total valid votes		12,362	98.00	
Total rejected ballots		252	2.00	
Unreturned ballots		0		
Turnout		12,614	70.48	
Registered electors		17,898		
Majority		3,833	31.00	▲12.03
BN hold		Swing		

Perak state election, 1978: Bukit Chandan
Party	Candidate	Votes	%	∆%
BN	Shafie Mat Saman	2,965	52.04	▼20.40
PAS	Zabidin Alang Othman	2,039	35.79	▲35.79
DAP	Ahmad Mohd. Nasir	693	12.16	▼1.41
Total valid votes		5,697	100.00	
Total rejected ballots		228		
Unreturned ballots		0		
Turnout		5,925	78.18	▲7.63
Registered electors		7,579		
Majority		926	16.25	▼42.21
BN hold		Swing		

Perak state election, 1974: Bukit Chandan
Party	Candidate	Votes	%
BN	Shafie Mat Saman	3,425	72.44
PEKEMAS	Fathil Khalid	661	13.98
DAP	Mohamed Noor Nasir	642	13.58
Total valid votes		4,728	100.00
Total rejected ballots		317	
Unreturned ballots		0	
Turnout		5,045	70.55
Registered electors		7,151	
Majority		2,764	58.46
This was a new constituency created.
