= Results of the 2004 Malaysian general election by parliamentary constituency =

These are the election results of the 2004 Malaysian general election by parliamentary constituency. Held on 21 March 2004, the 11th general election resulted in a victory for the Barisan Nasional (BN) with 63.8% of the vote. This led to BN taking 198 of the 219 seats in parliament.

These members of parliament (MPs) represented their constituency from the first sitting of 11th Malaysian Parliament to its dissolution.

The parliamentary election deposit was set at RM 10,000 per candidate. Similar to previous elections, the election deposit will be forfeited if the particular candidate had failed to secure at least 12.5% or one-eighth of the votes.

== Perlis ==
#	Constituency	Winner	Votes	Votes %	Opponent(s)	Votes	Votes %	Majority	Incumbent	Eligible voters	Malay voters	Chinese voters	Indian voters	Others voters	Muslim Bumiputera voters	Non-Muslim Bumiputera voters	Voter turnout	Voter turnout %	Spoilt votes	Spoilt votes %
P001	Padang Besar	Azmi Khalid (BN–UMNO)	18,323	64.4%	Wan Kharizal Wan Khazim (BA–PAS)	9,058	31.8%	9,265	Azmi Khalid (BN–UMNO)	33,899	84%	11%		3%			28,453	83.9%	672	2.4%
P002	Kangar	Mohd Radzi Sheikh Ahmad (BN–UMNO)	22,498	68.0%	Ishar Saad (BA–PAS)	9,950	30.1%	12,548	Abdul Hamid Pawanteh (BN–UMNO)	40,516	79%	18%	2%				33,095	81.7%	548	1.7%
P003	Arau	Syed Razlan Syed Putra Jamalullail (BN–UMNO)	17,367	54.2%	Haron Din (BA–PAS)	14,124	44.1%	3,243	Mastika Junaidah Husin (BN–UMNO)	38,067	87%	9%		2%			32,062	84.2%	533	1.7%

== Kedah ==
#	Constituency	Winner	Votes	Votes %	Opponent(s)	Votes	Votes %	Majority	Incumbent	Eligible voters	Malay voters	Chinese voters	Indian voters	Others voters	Muslim Bumiputera voters	Non-Muslim Bumiputera voters	Voter turnout	Voter turnout %	Spoilt votes	Spoilt votes %
P004	Langkawi	Abu Bakar Taib (BN–UMNO)	16,510	72.3%	Zubir Ahmad (BA–PAS)	5,738	25.1%	10,772	Abu Bakar Taib (BN–UMNO)	27,980	90%	7%	3%				22,844	81.6%	560	2.5%
P005	Jerlun	Abdul Rahman Ariffin (BN–UMNO)	19,123	51.9%	Idris Ahmad (BA–PAS)	16,981	46.1%	2,142	Abu Bakar Othman (BA–PAS)	44,148	90%	9%					36,822	83.4%	718	2.0%
P006	Kubang Pasu	Mohd Johari Baharum (BN–UMNO)	26,657	65.7%	Abdul Isa Ismail (BA–PAS)	12,945	31.9%	13,712	Mahathir Mohamad (BN–UMNO)	49,594	84%	10%	4%				40,602	81.9%	919	2.3%
P007	Padang Terap	Ghazali Ibrahim (BN–UMNO)	14,776	52.6%	Zawawi Ahmad (BA–PAS)	12,604	44.9%	2,172	Zawawi Ahmad (BA–PAS)	32,412	92%	2%		6%			28,094	86.7%	693	2.5%
P008	Pokok Sena	Abdul Rahman Ibrahim (BN–UMNO)	29,740	56.1%	Mahfuz Omar (BA–PAS)	22,440	42.3%	7,300	Mahfuz Omar (BA–PAS)	66,072	78%	19%	3%				53,035	80.3%	855	1.6%
P009	Alor Setar	Chor Chee Heung (BN–MCA)	28,379	65.6%	Siti Nor Abdul Hamid (BA–PKR)	13,864	32.1%	14,515	Chor Chee Heung (BN–MCA)	57,313	58%	36%	5%				43,257	75.5%	828	1.9%
P010	Kuala Kedah	Hashim Jahaya (BN–UMNO)	36,707	57.1%	Mohamad Sabu (BA–PAS)	26,493	41.2%	10,214	Mohamad Sabu (BA–PAS)	78,791	77%	21%	2%				64,332	81.7%	1,023	1.6%
P011	Pendang	Mohd Hayati Othman (BA–PAS)	24,430	49.7%	Md Rozai Shafian (BN–UMNO)	24,380	49.6%	50	Othman Abdul (BN–UMNO)	57,180	88%	7%		5%			49,193	86.0%	383	0.8%
P012	Jerai	Badruddin Amiruldin (BN–UMNO)	30,154	59.2%	Che Din Arshad (BA–PAS)	19,749	38.8%	10,405	New constituency	63,886	77%	16%	6%				50,918	79.7%	1,015	2.0%
P013	Sik	Wan Azmi Wan Ariffin (BN–UMNO)	15,357	48.5%	Azizan Abdul Razak (BA–PAS)	15,038	47.5%	319	Shahnon Ahmad (BA–PAS)	37,036	92%	2%		5%			31,682	85.5%	1,287	4.1%
P014	Merbok	Zainuddin Maidin (BN–UMNO)	29,607	65.8%	Saiful Izham Ramli (BA–PKR)	14,162	31.5%	15,445	Daim Zainuddin (BN–UMNO)	57,922	63%	19%	18%				44,981	77.7%	1,142	2.5%
P015	Sungai Petani	Mahadzir Mohd Khir (BN–UMNO)	36,067	64.8%	Zamri Yusuf (BA–PKR)	18,565	33.4%	17,502	Mahadzir Mohd Khir (BN–UMNO)	70,920	58%	31%	11%				55,639	78.5%	1,007	1.8%
P016	Baling	Mashitah Ibrahim (BN–UMNO)	32,661	52.5%	Taib Azamudden Md Taib (BA–PAS)	28,432	45.7%	4,229	Taib Azamudden Md Taib (BA–PAS)	74,698	87%	6%	5%				62,202	83.2%	1,109	1.8%
P017	Padang Serai	Lim Bee Kau (BN–MCA)	26,269	60.7%	Saifuddin Nasution Ismail (BA–PKR)	15,953	36.8%	10,316	Lim Bee Kau (BN–MCA)	53,925	53%	24%	23%				43,307	80.3%	1,075	2.5%
P018	Kulim-Bandar Baharu	Abdul Kadir Sheikh Fadzir (BN–UMNO)	22,556	58.2%	Alwi Mohamed Yusop (BA–PKR)	14,558	37.5%	7,998	Abdul Kadir Sheikh Fadzir (BN–UMNO)	50,024	67%	21%	12%				38,789	77.5%	1,181	3.0%

== Kelantan ==
#	Constituency	Winner	Votes	Votes %	Opponent(s)	Votes	Votes %	Majority	Incumbent	Eligible voters	Malay voters	Chinese voters	Indian voters	Others voters	Muslim Bumiputera voters	Non-Muslim Bumiputera voters	Voter turnout	Voter turnout %	Spoilt votes	Spoilt votes %
P019	Tumpat	Kamarudin Jaffar (BA–PAS)	27,919	50.7%	Mat Nawawi Mat Jusoh (BN–UMNO)	26,099	47.4%	1,820	Kamarudin Jaffar (BA–PAS)	70,810	92%	3%		4%			55,090	77.8%	1,072	2.0%
P020	Pengkalan Chepa	Abdul Halim Abdul Rahman (BA–PAS)	20,621	57.1%	Nik Mohd Zain Omar (BN–UMNO)	14,399	39.8%	6,222	Nik Mohd. Amar Nik Abdullah (BA–PAS)	44,844	97%	2%					36,135	80.6%	818	2.3%
P021	Kota Bharu	Zaid Ibrahim (BN–UMNO)	23,831	51.0%	Nik Mahmood Nik Hassan (BA–PKR)	22,108	47.3%	1,723	Ramli Ibrahim (BA–PKR)	61,409	79%	19%					46,707	76.1%	768	1.6%
P022	Pasir Mas	Ismail Noh (BA–PAS)	17,526	42.3%	Ahmed Rahim Abdul Rahman (BN–UMNO)	16,275	39.3%	1,251	Ismail Noh (BA–PAS)	52,771	96%	4%					41,395	78.4%	1,396	3.4%
P022	Pasir Mas	Ismail Noh (BA–PAS)	17,526	42.3%	Ibrahim Ali (IND)	6,198	15.0%	1,251	Ismail Noh (BA–PAS)	52,771	96%	4%					41,395	78.4%	1,396	3.4%
P023	Rantau Panjang	Abdul Fatah Haron (BA–PAS)	15,027	49.9%	Mohd Daud Hamat (BN–UMNO)	14,295	47.5%	732	Abdul Fatah Haron (BA–PAS)	40,956	98%						30,088	73.5%	701	2.3%
P024	Kubang Kerian	Salahuddin Ayub (BA–PAS)	21,430	55.7%	Ahmad Rusli Iberahim (BN–UMNO)	15,803	41.1%	5,627	Husam Musa (BA–PAS)	47,148	98%	2%					38,458	81.6%	1,225	3.2%
P025	Bachok	Awang Adek Hussin (BN–UMNO)	25,194	52.5%	Wan Nik Wan Yusoff (BA–PAS)	21,922	45.7%	3,272	Wan Nik Wan Yusoff (BA–PAS)	55,319	98%						48,009	86.8%	893	1.9%
P026	Ketereh	Md Alwi Che Ahmad (BN–UMNO)	20,024	52.4%	Muhamad Mustafa (BA–PKR)	17,136	44.9%	2,888	New constituency	46,493	97%	2%					38,187	82.1%	751	2.0%
P027	Tanah Merah	Shaari Hassan (BN–UMNO)	16,107	52.1%	Saupi Daud (BA–PKR)	13,580	43.9%	2,527	Saupi Daud (BA–PKR)	37,665	93%	5%					30,915	82.1%	788	2.6%
P028	Pasir Puteh	Kalthom Othman (BA–PAS)	27,018	52.3%	Che Min Che Ahmad (BN–UMNO)	23,208	44.9%	3,810	Alwi Jusoh (BA–PAS)	57,308	98%	2%					51,676	90.2%	1,184	2.3%
P029	Machang	Sazmi Miah (BN–UMNO)	17,464	49.3%	Mohd Yusof Mohd Noor (BA–PAS)	17,329	49.0%	135	Mohd Yusof Mohd Noor (BA–PAS)	43,874	95%	5%					35,392	80.7%	599	1.7%
P030	Jeli	Mustapa Mohamed (BN–UMNO)	16,960	62.9%	Mohd Apandi Mohamad (BA–PAS)	9,607	35.6%	7,353	Mohd Apandi Mohamad (BA–PAS)	32,729	99%						26,961	82.4%	394	1.5%
P031	Kuala Krai	Mohammad Razali Che Mamat (BN–UMNO)	19,148	52.2%	Wan Abdul Rahim Wan Abdullah (BA–PAS)	16,732	45.6%	2,416	Mohamed Nasir Che Daud (BA–PAS)	45,259	92%	6%	2%				36,667	81.0%	785	2.1%
P032	Gua Musang	Tengku Razaleigh Hamzah (BN–UMNO)	13,570	64.4%	Zulkefli Mohamed (BA–PAS)	6,972	33.1%	6,598	Tengku Razaleigh Hamzah (BN–UMNO)	26,137	82%	9%		9%			21,076	80.6%	534	2.5%

== Terengganu ==
#	Constituency	Winner	Votes	Votes %	Opponent(s)	Votes	Votes %	Majority	Incumbent	Eligible voters	Malay voters	Chinese voters	Indian voters	Others voters	Muslim Bumiputera voters	Non-Muslim Bumiputera voters	Voter turnout	Voter turnout %	Spoilt votes	Spoilt votes %
P033	Besut	Abdullah Md Zin (BN–UMNO)	26,087	58.8%	Nasharuddin Mat Isa (BA–PAS)	17,587	39.6%	8,500	Hassan Mohamed (BA–PAS)	51,284	98%	2%					44,357	86.5%	683	1.5%
P034	Setiu	Mohd Yusof Majid (BN–UMNO)	23,079	57.1%	Che Ghani Che Ambak (BA–PAS)	16,383	40.5%	6,696	Che Ghani Che Ambak (BA–PAS)	48,161	99%						40,412	83.9%	714	1.8%
P035	Kuala Nerus	Che Azmi Abd Rahman (BN–UMNO)	24,895	53.5%	Mohd Shukrimun Shamsuddin (BA–PAS)	20,798	44.7%	4,097	Mohd Shukrimun Shamsuddin (BA–PAS)	52,468	99%						46,546	88.7%	713	1.5%
P036	Kuala Terengganu	Razali Ismail (BN–UMNO)	30,994	50.9%	Syed Azman Syed Ahmad Nawawi (BA–PAS)	29,061	47.7%	1,933	Syed Azman Syed Ahmad Nawawi (BA–PAS)	72,259	88%	12%					60,939	84.3%	790	1.3%
P037	Marang	Abdul Rahman Bakar (BN–UMNO)	28,076	49.1%	Abdul Hadi Awang (BA–PAS)	27,913	48.8%	163	Abdul Hadi Awang (BA–PAS)	64,367	98%	2%					57,186	88.8%	866	1.5%
P038	Hulu Terengganu	Tengku Putera Tengku Awang (BN–UMNO)	23,815	58.7%	Muhyiddin Abdul Rashid (BA–PAS)	16,055	39.6%	7,760	Muhyiddin Abdul Rashid (BA–PAS)	45,258	99%						40,559	89.6%	633	1.6%
P039	Dungun	Rosli Mat Hassan (BN–UMNO)	26,398	52.6%	Mustafa Ali (BA–PAS)	21,502	42.8%	4,896	Mustafa Ali (BA–PAS)	55,711	95%	5%					50,206	90.1%	708	1.4%
P040	Kemaman	Ahmad Shabery Cheek (BN–UMNO)	36,517	62.5%	Abd Rahman Yusof (BA–PKR)	20,635	35.3%	15,882	Abdul Rahman Yusof (BA–PKR)	66,416	91%	8%					58,461	88.0%	1,036	1.8%

== Penang ==
#	Constituency	Winner	Votes	Votes %	Opponent(s)	Votes	Votes %	Majority	Incumbent	Eligible voters	Malay voters	Chinese voters	Indian voters	Others voters	Muslim Bumiputera voters	Non-Muslim Bumiputera voters	Voter turnout	Voter turnout %	Spoilt votes	Spoilt votes %
P041	Kepala Batas	Abdullah Ahmad Badawi (BN–UMNO)	25,403	76.2%	Abdul Khalid Rasid (BA–PAS)	7,281	21.8%	18,122	Abdullah Ahmad Badawi (BN–UMNO)	39,622	74%	22%	4%				33,356	84.2%	672	2.0%
P042	Tasek Gelugor	Mohd Shariff Omar (BN–UMNO)	22,011	63.7%	Mujahid Yusof Rawa (BA–PAS)	11,828	34.2%	10,183	Mohd Shariff Omar (BN–UMNO)	41,615	77%	15%	7%				34,551	83.0%	620	1.8%
P043	Bagan	Lim Hock Seng (DAP)	23,095	53.0%	Lim Chien Aun (BN–MCA)	19,473	44.7%	3,622	Lim Hock Seng (BA–DAP)	57,322	15%	71%	14%				43,542	76.0%	961	2.2%
P044	Permatang Pauh	Wan Azizah Wan Ismail (BA–PKR)	21,737	49.7%	Pirdaus Ismail (BN–UMNO)	21,147	48.4%	590	Wan Azizah Wan Ismail (BA–PKR)	54,041	68%	26%	6%				43,734	80.9%	665	1.5%
P045	Bukit Mertajam	Chong Eng (DAP)	26,215	57.7%	Ma Kok Ben (BN–MCA)	17,651	38.8%	8,564	Chong Eng (BA–DAP)	58,736	19%	73%	9%				45,442	77.4%	1,148	2.5%
P046	Batu Kawan	Huan Cheng Guan (BN–Gerakan)	17,097	52.5%	Law Choo Kiang (BA–PKR)	8,099	24.9%	8,998	New constituency	43,055	21%	56%	23%				32,559	75.6%	811	2.5%
P046	Batu Kawan	Huan Cheng Guan (BN–Gerakan)	17,097	52.5%	Tanasekharan Autherapady (DAP)	6,552	20.1%	8,998	New constituency	43,055	21%	56%	23%				32,559	75.6%	811	2.5%
P047	Nibong Tebal	Zainal Abidin Osman (BN–UMNO)	18,823	58.1%	Goh Kheng Huat (DAP)	12,818	39.5%	6,005	Goh Kheng Huat (BA–DAP)	41,161	44%	41%	16%				32,413	78.8%	751	2.3%
P048	Bukit Bendera	Chia Kwang Chye (BN–Gerakan)	28,281	60.4%	Zulkifli Mohd Noor (DAP)	17,564	37.5%	10,717	Chia Kwang Chye (BN–Gerakan)	65,126	14%	74%	11%				46,843	71.9%	998	2.1%
P049	Tanjong	Chow Kon Yeow (DAP)	21,652	54.4%	Ooi Swee Hing (BN–Gerakan)	17,424	43.8%	4,228	Chow Kon Yeow (BA–DAP)	57,902	5%	86%	9%				39,793	68.7%	717	1.8%
P050	Jelutong	Lee Kah Choon (BN–Gerakan)	24,988	57.4%	Gooi Seong Kin (DAP)	17,518	40.2%	7,470	Lee Kah Choon (BN–Gerakan)	59,641	20%	68%	12%				43,538	73.0%	1,002	2.3%
P051	Bukit Gelugor	Karpal Singh Ram Singh (DAP)	22,529	50.5%	Lim Boo Chang (BN–MCA)	21,268	47.7%	1,261	New constituency	60,123	16%	74%	10%				44,618	74.2%	793	1.8%
P052	Bayan Baru	Wong Kam Hoong (BN–MCA)	29,430	71.7%	Ong Peng Cheow (BA–PKR)	10,579	25.8%	18,851	Wong Kam Hoong (BN–MCA)	55,407	40%	48%	12%				41,020	74.0%	1,010	2.5%
P053	Balik Pulau	Hilmi Yahaya (BN–UMNO)	21,114	70.7%	Rohana Ariffin (BA–PKR)	8,177	27.4%	12,937	Mohd. Zain Omar (BN–UMNO)	38,611	59%	36%	4%				29,855	77.4%	564	1.9%

== Perak ==
#	Constituency	Winner	Votes	Votes %	Opponent(s)	Votes	Votes %	Majority	Incumbent	Eligible voters	Malay voters	Chinese voters	Indian voters	Others voters	Muslim Bumiputera voters	Non-Muslim Bumiputera voters	Voter turnout	Voter turnout %	Spoilt votes	Spoilt votes %
P054	Gerik	Wan Hashim Wan Teh (BN–UMNO)	12,293	71.3%	Ramli Tusin (BA–PAS)	4,213	24.4%	8,080	Khamsiyah Yeop (BN–UMNO)	24,646	67%	20%		8%			17,247	70.0%	737	4.3%
P055	Lenggong	Khamsiyah Yeop (BN–UMNO)	10,924	66.1%	Zulkifli Abu (BA–PAS)	5,292	32.0%	5,632	New constituency	23,159	78%	18%	2%				16,531	71.4%	295	1.8%
P056	Larut	Raja Ahmad Zainuddin Raja Omar (BN–UMNO)	18,421	61.0%	Kamaruddin Awang Basir (BA–PAS)	10,983	36.4%	7,438	Raja Ahmad Zainuddin Raja Omar (BN–UMNO)	40,150	86%	7%	7%				30,177	75.2%	756	2.5%
P057	Parit Buntar	Abdul Hamid Zainal Abidin (BN–UMNO)	19,317	55.9%	Hasan Mohamed Ali (BA–PAS)	14,619	42.3%	4,698	Hasan Mohamed Ali (BA–PAS)	44,797	67%	28%	5%				34,566	77.2%	590	1.7%
P058	Bagan Serai	Zainal Abidin Zin (BN–UMNO)	19,827	56.5%	Ahmad Awang (BA–PAS)	14,213	40.5%	5,614	Zainal Abidin Zin (BN–UMNO)	47,745	73%	16%	11%				35,066	73.4%	982	2.8%
P059	Bukit Gantang	Tan Lian Hoe (BN–Gerakan)	16,846	60.8%	Lo' Lo' Mohd Ghazali (BA–PAS)	10,144	36.6%	6,702	Abdullah Fadzil Che Wan (BN–UMNO)	53,880	63%	28%	10%				27,699	51.4%	655	2.4%
P060	Taiping	M. Kayveas (BN–PPP)	20,129	44.9%	Ong Chee Keng (DAP)	17,957	40.1%	2,172	Kerk Choo Ting (BN–Gerakan)	65,046	32%	53%	14%				44,821	68.9%	1,337	3.0%
P060	Taiping	M. Kayveas (BN–PPP)	20,129	44.9%	Annah Dorai Pakiri (BA–PKR)	4,371	9.8%	2,172	Kerk Choo Ting (BN–Gerakan)	65,046	32%	53%	14%				44,821	68.9%	1,337	3.0%
P061	Padang Rengas	Mohamed Nazri Abdul Aziz (BN–UMNO)	9,214	65.7%	Mohd Zolkafli Yahaya (BA–PKR)	4,442	31.7%	4,772	Mohamed Nazri Abdul Aziz (BN–UMNO)	24,863	73%	20%	7%				14,025	56.4%	323	2.3%
P062	Sungai Siput	Samy Vellu Sangalimuthu (BN–MIC)	18,797	60.9%	Michael Jeyakumar Devaraj (BA–PKR)	8,562	27.7%	10,235	Samy Vellu Sangalimuthu (BN–MIC)	46,783	31%	41%	23%				30,863	66.0%	583	1.9%
P062	Sungai Siput	Samy Vellu Sangalimuthu (BN–MIC)	18,797	60.9%	Samugam Ponmugam Ponnan (DAP)	2,864	9.3%	10,235	Samy Vellu Sangalimuthu (BN–MIC)	46,783	31%	41%	23%				30,863	66.0%	583	1.9%
P063	Tambun	Ahmad Husni Hanadzlah (BN–UMNO)	31,824	66.9%	Khairuddin Abdul Malek (BA–PAS)	14,464	30.4%	17,360	Ahmad Husni Hanadzlah (BN–UMNO)	65,219	63%	24%	12%				47,572	72.9%	1,280	2.7%
P064	Ipoh Timor	Lim Kit Siang (DAP)	28,851	58.7%	Thong Fah Chong (BN–MCA)	19,077	38.8%	9,774	Thong Fah Chong (BN–MCA)	73,333	9%	86%	5%				49,175	67.1%	933	1.9%
P065	Ipoh Barat	Kulasegaran Murugeson (DAP)	22,935	49.0%	Ho Cheong Sing (BN–MCA)	22,337	47.8%	598	Ho Cheong Sing (BN–MCA)	68,394	13%	64%	23%				46,768	68.4%	1,015	2.2%
P066	Batu Gajah	Fong Po Kuan (DAP)	28,662	56.3%	Ong Ka Chuan (BN–MCA)	20,735	40.7%	7,927	Fong Po Kuan (BA–DAP)	73,148	10%	79%	11%				50,952	69.7%	771	1.5%
P067	Kuala Kangsar	Rafidah Aziz (BN–UMNO)	11,305	64.7%	Mohammad Nizar Jamaluddin (BA–PAS)	5,748	32.9%	5,557	Rafidah Aziz (BN–UMNO)	28,391	65%	27%	7%				17,484	61.6%	305	1.7%
P068	Beruas	Lim Keng Yaik (BN–Gerakan)	15,867	54.1%	Nga Hock Cheh (DAP)	11,303	38.6%	4,564	Lim Keng Yaik (BN–Gerakan)	42,173	32%	55%	13%				29,318	69.5%	1,103	3.8%
P069	Parit	Nasarudin Hashim (BN–UMNO)	12,808	59.5%	Muhammad Ismi Mat Taib (BA–PAS)	8,112	37.7%	4,696	Mat Basir Rahmat (BA–PAS)	28,916	91%	4%	4%				21,532	74.5%	483	2.2%
P070	Kampar	Hew See Tong (BN–MCA)	23,129	60.3%	Liew Ah Kim (DAP)	13,655	35.6%	9,474	Hew See Tong (BN–MCA)	60,874	26%	64%	10%				38,326	63.0%	1,542	4.0%
P071	Gopeng	Ting Chew Peh (BN–MCA)	29,660	62.8%	Lee Boon Chye (BA–PKR)	15,400	32.6%	14,260	Ting Chew Peh (BN–MCA)	68,466	42%	48%	9%				47,214	69.0%	1,323	2.8%
P072	Tapah	S Veerasingam (BN–MIC)	16,945	66.0%	Mohd Radzi Othman (BA–PAS)	7,359	28.7%	9,586	S Veerasingam (BN–MIC)	38,899	44%	34%	13%				25,681	66.0%	956	3.7%
P073	Pasir Salak	Ramli Ngah Talib (BN–UMNO)	19,422	62.2%	Muhaimin Sulam (BA–PAS)	10,875	34.8%	8,547	Ramli Ngah Talib (BN–UMNO)	42,959	79%	15%	5%				31,216	72.7%	919	2.9%
P074	Lumut	Kong Cho Ha (BN–MCA)	27,415	54.6%	Mustaffa Kamil Ayub (BA–PKR)	15,801	31.5%	11,614	Kong Cho Ha (BN–MCA)	68,522	47%	41%	11%				50,179	73.2%	1,477	2.9%
P075	Bagan Datok	Ahmad Zahid Hamidi (BN–UMNO)	17,049	75.3%	Ayyathurai Achutaraman (BA–PKR)	4,510	19.9%	12,539	Ahmad Zahid Hamidi (BN–UMNO)	34,182	57%	20%	23%				22,634	66.2%	1,075	4.8%
P076	Telok Intan	Mah Siew Keong (BN–Gerakan)	18,665	53.5%	Wu Him Ven (DAP)	8,829	25.3%	9,836	Mah Siew Keong (BN–Gerakan)	53,063	35%	45%	20%				34,877	65.7%	1,255	3.6%
P076	Telok Intan	Mah Siew Keong (BN–Gerakan)	18,665	53.5%	Gobalakrishnan Nagapan (BA–PKR)	6,128	17.6%	9,836	Mah Siew Keong (BN–Gerakan)	53,063	35%	45%	20%				34,877	65.7%	1,255	3.6%
P077	Tanjong Malim	Loke Yuen Yow (BN–MCA)	24,025	68.8%	Shamsuddin Abdul Rahman (BA–PKR)	9,489	27.2%	14,536	Loke Yuen Yow (BN–MCA)	52,743	49%	32%	16%				34,906	66.2%	1,275	3.7%

== Pahang ==
#	Constituency	Winner	Votes	Votes %	Opponent(s)	Votes	Votes %	Majority	Incumbent	Eligible voters	Malay voters	Chinese voters	Indian voters	Others voters	Muslim Bumiputera voters	Non-Muslim Bumiputera voters	Voter turnout	Voter turnout %	Spoilt votes	Spoilt votes %
P078	Cameron Highlands	Devamany S. Krishnasamy (BN–MIC)	10,226	67.3%	Apalasamy Jataliah (DAP)	3,966	26.1%	6,260	New constituency	23,061	36%	33%		16%			15,202	65.9%	1,010	6.6%
P079	Lipis	Mohamad Shahrum Osman (BN–UMNO)	13,870	66.4%	Mohd Zai Mustafa (BA–PAS)	6,246	29.9%	7,624	Amihamzah Ahmad (BN–UMNO)	28,083	73%	20%	7%				20,875	74.3%	528	2.5%
P080	Raub	Ng Yen Yen (BN–MCA)	20,472	62.9%	Choong Siew Oon (DAP)	10,720	32.9%	9,752	Ng Yen Yen (BN–MCA)	44,543	48%	44%	7%				32,546	73.1%	1,280	3.9%
P081	Jerantut	Tengku Azlan Sultan Abu Bakar (BN–UMNO)	21,349	58.6%	Hamzah Jaafar (BA–PAS)	12,892	35.4%	8,457	Tengku Azlan Sultan Abu Bakar (BN–UMNO)	46,059	80%	15%	3%				36,444	79.1%	776	2.1%
P082	Indera Mahkota	Wan Adnan Wan Mamat (BN–UMNO)	25,177	67.5%	Dzulkifli Ismail (BA–PKR)	10,948	29.4%	14,229	New constituency	47,455	65%	28%	6%				37,296	78.6%	801	2.2%
P083	Kuantan	Fu Ah Kiow (BN–MCA)	21,324	62.2%	Fuziah Salleh (BA–PKR)	12,177	35.5%	9,147	Mohd Khalil Yaakob (BN–UMNO)	45,935	58%	37%	5%				34,290	74.7%	543	1.6%
P084	Paya Besar	Siti Zaharah Sulaiman (BN–UMNO)	20,474	70.6%	Saari Sungib (BA–PKR)	7,956	27.4%	12,518	Siti Zaharah Sulaiman (BN–UMNO)	37,440	78%	19%	2%				29,001	77.5%	564	1.9%
P085	Pekan	Najib Razak (BN–UMNO)	31,956	77.9%	Zakaria Dahlan (BA–PAS)	9,034	22.0%	22,922	Najib Razak (BN–UMNO)	52,687	89%	3%		6%			41,046	77.9%	56	0.1%
P086	Maran	Ismail Muttalib (BN–UMNO)	15,725	63.1%	Tuan Ibrahim Tuan Man (BA–PAS)	8,483	34.1%	7,242	Muhammad Abdullah (BN–UMNO)	31,860	89%	8%	2%				24,910	78.2%	569	2.3%
P087	Kuala Krau	Ismail Mohamed Said (BN–UMNO)	16,021	63.6%	Musaniff Ab Rahman (BA–PAS)	8,670	34.4%	7,351	New constituency	31,404	89%	4%		4%			25,179	80.2%	487	1.9%
P088	Temerloh	Mohd Sarit Yusoh (BN–UMNO)	24,633	65.6%	Idris Omar (BA–PAS)	12,026	32.0%	12,607	Mohd Sarit Yusoh (BN–UMNO)	49,984	62%	27%	9%				37,543	75.1%	884	2.4%
P089	Bentong	Liow Tiong Lai (BN–MCA)	27,144	70.2%	Abu Bakar Lebai Sudin (DAP)	10,305	26.6%	16,839	Liow Tiong Lai (BN–MCA)	52,665	41%	49%	9%				38,689	73.5%	1,000	2.6%
P090	Bera	Ismail Sabri Yaakob (BN–UMNO)	16,714	55.9%	Abdul Wahab Ismail (BA–PAS)	12,244	41.0%	4,470	New constituency	40,631	58%	35%	5%				29,874	73.5%	889	3.0%
P091	Rompin	Jamaluddin Jarjis (BN–UMNO)	19,359	65.4%	Sukri Ahmad (BA–PAS)	10,009	33.8%	9,350	Jamaluddin Jarjis (BN–UMNO)	38,319	89%	3%		6%			29,585	79.0%	217	2.3%

== Selangor ==
#	Constituency	Winner	Votes	Votes %	Opponent(s)	Votes	Votes %	Majority	Incumbent	Eligible voters	Malay voters	Chinese voters	Indian voters	Others voters	Muslim Bumiputera voters	Non-Muslim Bumiputera voters	Voter turnout	Voter turnout %	Spoilt votes	Spoilt votes %
P092	Sabak Bernam	Mat Yasir Ikhsan (BN–UMNO)	13,826	59.9%	Badrul Amin Bahron (BA–PKR)	8,478	36.7%	5,348	Zainal Dahlan (BN–UMNO)	30,862	80%	14%	6%				23,087	74.8%	776	3.4%
P093	Sungai Besar	Noriah Kasnon (BN–UMNO)	15,337	63.6%	Sallehen Mukhyi (BA–PAS)	7,988	33.1%	7,349	New constituency	31,001	66%	32%	2%				24,120	77.8%	795	3.3%
P094	Hulu Selangor	Palanivel K. Govindasamy (BN–MIC)	27,807	65.3%	Ismail Kamus (BA–PAS)	13,324	31.3%	14,483	Palanivel K. Govindasamy (BN–MIC)	58,533	50%	29%	19%				42,592	72.8%	1,406	3.3%
P095	Tanjong Karang	Noh Omar (BN–UMNO)	17,750	65.3%	Abdul Ghani Samsudin (BA–PAS)	8,742	32.1%	9,008	Noh Omar (BN–UMNO)	35,816	70%	18%	13%				27,196	75.9%	704	2.6%
P096	Kuala Selangor	Mohd Daud Tarihep (BN–UMNO)	22,001	70.4%	Raja Kamaruddin Raja Abdul Wahid (BA–PKR)	8,339	26.7%	13,662	Jamaluddin Adnan (BN–UMNO)	41,712	60%	17%	23%				31,231	74.9%	866	2.8%
P097	Selayang	Chan Kong Choy (BN–MCA)	36,343	71.2%	Koh Swe Yong (BA–PKR)	13,117	25.7%	23,226	Chan Kong Choy (BN–MCA)	71,152	44%	39%	17%				51,033	71.7%	1,444	2.8%
P098	Gombak	Rahman Ismail (BN–UMNO)	39,870	59.2%	Mohd Hatta Ramli (BA–PAS)	26,663	39.6%	13,207	Zaleha Ismail (BN–UMNO)	92,225	74%	14%	11%				67,358	73.0%	691	1.0%
P099	Ampang	Rozaidah Talib (BN–UMNO)	33,214	70.0%	Xavier Jayakumar Arulanandam (BA–PKR)	13,482	28.4%	19,732	New constituency	66,626	55%	35%	10%				47,479	71.3%	710	1.5%
P100	Pandan	Ong Tee Keat (BN–MCA)	26,721	66.8%	Iskandar Abdul Samad (BA–PAS)	12,609	31.5%	14,112	New constituency	57,884	52%	42%	5%				40,024	69.2%	632	1.6%
P101	Hulu Langat	Markiman Kobiran (BN–UMNO)	40,937	66.9%	Yeop Adlan Che Rose (BA–PAS)	18,160	29.7%	22,777	Badrul Hisham Abdul Aziz (BN–UMNO)	79,999	52%	37%	10%				61,209	76.5%	1,625	2.7%
P102	Serdang	Yap Pian Hon (BN–MCA)	34,495	57.6%	Wong Kok Yew (DAP)	23,215	38.8%	11,280	Yap Pian Hon (BN–MCA)	78,837	34%	54%	11%				59,850	75.9%	2,038	3.4%
P103	Puchong	Loo Yeng Peng (BN–Gerakan)	21,291	52.6%	Azmi Jamion (BA–PAS)	9,409	23.2%	11,882	New constituency	59,694	47%	36%	16%				40,496	67.8%	533	1.3%
P103	Puchong	Loo Yeng Peng (BN–Gerakan)	21,291	52.6%	Wong Choong Yun (DAP)	9,185	22.7%	11,882	New constituency	59,694	47%	36%	16%				40,496	67.8%	533	1.3%
P104	Kelana Jaya	Loh Seng Kok (BN–MCA)	35,846	70.6%	Syed Shahir Syed Mohamed (BA–PKR)	14,275	28.1%	21,571	New constituency	72,518	42%	38%	19%				50,803	70.1%	627	1.2%
P105	Petaling Jaya Selatan	Donald Lim Siang Chai (BN–MCA)	35,054	70.5%	Sivarasa Rasiah (BA–PKR)	13,638	27.4%	21,416	Donald Lim Siang Chai (BN–MCA)	73,503	37%	47%	16%				49,738	67.7%	1,008	2.0%
P106	Petaling Jaya Utara	Chew Mei Fun (BN–MCA)	32,422	61.8%	Ronnie Liu Tian Khiew (DAP)	19,379	36.9%	13,043	Chew Mei Fun (BN–MCA)	75,935	15%	77%	7%				52,460	69.1%	619	1.2%
P107	Subang	Karnail Singh Nijhar (BN–MIC)	32,941	63.3%	Mohd Nasir Hashim (BA–PKR)	17,481	33.6%	15,460	Karnail Singh Nijhar (BN–MIC)	68,739	49%	34%	16%				52,017	75.7%	1,063	2.0%
P108	Shah Alam	Abdul Aziz Shamsuddin (BN–UMNO)	32,417	61.9%	Khalid Samad (BA–PAS)	19,007	36.3%	13,410	Mohd Zin Mohamed (BN–UMNO)	69,170	66%	17%	17%				52,336	75.7%	699	1.3%
P109	Kapar	Komala Devi M. Perumal (BN–MIC)	44,007	58.1%	Ang Hiok Gai (BA–PKR)	29,419	38.8%	14,588	Komala Devi M. Perumal (BN–MIC)	104,185	49%	38%	13%				75,789	72.7%	2,356	3.1%
P110	Klang	Tan Yee Kew (BN–MCA)	32,138	61.5%	Wong Ang Peng (DAP)	18,857	36.1%	13,281	Tan Yee Kew (BN–MCA)	74,062	33%	47%	19%				52,265	70.6%	1,215	2.3%
P111	Kota Raja	Vigneswaran Sanasee (BN–MIC)	24,376	54.5%	Siti Mariah Mahmud (BA–PAS)	16,137	36.1%	8,239	New constituency	58,374	50%	21%	28%				44,758	76.7%	627	1.4%
P111	Kota Raja	Vigneswaran Sanasee (BN–MIC)	24,376	54.5%	Krisnasamy Thevarayan (IND)	3,608	8.1%	8,239	New constituency	58,374	50%	21%	28%				44,758	76.7%	627	1.4%
P112	Kuala Langat	Shafie Salleh (BN–UMNO)	34,118	70.1%	Zulkifli Noordin (BA–PKR)	12,623	25.9%	21,495	Shafie Salleh (BN–UMNO)	63,151	52%	27%	19%				48,694	77.1%	1,387	2.9%
P113	Sepang	Mohd Zin Mohamed (BN–UMNO)	30,755	71.4%	Mohamed Makki Ahmad (PR–PAS)	11,918	27.7%	18,837	Seripah Noli Syed Hussin (BN–UMNO)	58,296	55%	24%	19%				43,054	73.9%	315	0.7%

== Federal Territory of Kuala Lumpur ==
#	Constituency	Winner	Votes	Votes %	Opponent(s)	Votes	Votes %	Majority	Incumbent	Eligible voters	Malay voters	Chinese voters	Indian voters	Others voters	Muslim Bumiputera voters	Non-Muslim Bumiputera voters	Voter turnout	Voter turnout %	Spoilt votes	Spoilt votes %
P114	Kepong	Tan Seng Giaw (DAP)	23,282	51.8%	Ma Woei Chyi (BN–Gerakan)	21,428	47.7%	1,854	Tan Seng Giaw (BA–DAP)	60,273	4%	91%	5%				44,956	74.6%	212	0.5%
P115	Batu	Ng Lip Yong (BN–Gerakan)	28,718	62.1%	Chua Tian Chang (BA–PKR)	17,201	37.2%	11,517	Ng Lip Yong (BN–Gerakan)	67,652	42%	41%	16%				46,228	68.3%	309	0.7%
P116	Wangsa Maju	Yew Teong Look (BN–MCA)	23,135	62.1%	Sahri Bahari (BA–PKR)	12,950	34.8%	10,185	Zulhasnan Rafique (BN–UMNO)	50,682	53%	38%	8%				37,254	73.5%	340	0.9%
P117	Segambut	Tan Kee Kwong (BN–Gerakan)	28,061	69.7%	Kuan Perk Siong (DAP)	11,093	27.6%	16,968	Tan Kee Kwong (BN–Gerakan)	57,349	35%	49%	15%				40,261	70.2%	640	1.6%
P118	Setiawangsa	Zulhasnan Rafique (BN–UMNO)	27,757	76.8%	Abdul Rashid Hassan Basri (BA–PAS)	8,088	22.4%	19,669	New constituency	51,536	52%	36%	10%				36,137	70.1%	292	0.8%
P119	Titiwangsa	Astaman Abdul Aziz (BN–UMNO)	22,910	65.5%	Mohamad Noor Mohamad (BA–PAS)	11,095	31.7%	11,815	Suleiman Mohamed (BN–UMNO)	52,017	64%	24%	11%				34,980	67.3%	189	0.5%
P120	Bukit Bintang	Fong Kui Lun (DAP)	19,103	47.8%	Tan Chew Mooi (BN–MCA)	18,799	47.1%	304	Fong Kui Lun (BA–DAP)	65,112	13%	76%	11%				39,938	61.3%	499	1.3%
P120	Bukit Bintang	Fong Kui Lun (DAP)	19,103	47.8%	Wee Choo Keong (MDP)	1,107	2.8%	304	Fong Kui Lun (BA–DAP)	65,112	13%	76%	11%				39,938	61.3%	499	1.3%
P120	Bukit Bintang	Fong Kui Lun (DAP)	19,103	47.8%	Billi Lim Peng Soon (IND)	132	0.3%	304	Fong Kui Lun (BA–DAP)	65,112	13%	76%	11%				39,938	61.3%	499	1.3%
P121	Lembah Pantai	Shahrizat Abdul Jalil (BN–UMNO)	26,474	69.7%	Sanusi Osman (BA–PKR)	11,186	29.5%	15,288	Shahrizat Abdul Jalil (BN–UMNO)	56,562	53%	26%	20%				37,958	67.1%	213	0.6%
P122	Seputeh	Teresa Kok Suh Sim (DAP)	28,921	62.2%	Chin Yen Foo (BN–MCA)	17,418	37.4%	11,503	Teresa Kok Suh Sim (BA–DAP)	74,702	5%	89%	5%				46,532	62.3%	164	0.4%
P123	Cheras	Tan Kok Wai (DAP)	26,940	62.4%	Lee Boon Kok (BN–MCA)	15,970	37.0%	10,970	Tan Kok Wai (BA–DAP)	67,794	9%	83%	7%				43,200	63.7%	236	0.6%
P124	Bandar Tun Razak	Tan Chai Ho (BN–MCA)	33,223	66.4%	Rosli Ibrahim (BA–PKR)	15,696	31.4%	17,527	Tan Chai Ho (BN–MCA)	67,241	51%	40%	8%				50,015	74.4%	600	1.2%

== Putrajaya ==
#	Constituency	Winner	Votes	Votes %	Opponent(s)	Votes	Votes %	Majority	Incumbent	Eligible voters	Malay voters	Chinese voters	Indian voters	Others voters	Muslim Bumiputera voters	Non-Muslim Bumiputera voters	Voter turnout	Voter turnout %	Spoilt votes	Spoilt votes %
P125	Putrajaya	Tengku Adnan Tengku Mansor (BN–UMNO)	4,086	87.6%	Abdul Rahman Othman (BA–PKR)	540	11.6%	3,546	New constituency	5,079	95%	2%	3%				4,662	91.8%	28	0.6%

== Negeri Sembilan ==
#	Constituency	Winner	Votes	Votes %	Opponent(s)	Votes	Votes %	Majority	Incumbent	Eligible voters	Malay voters	Chinese voters	Indian voters	Others voters	Muslim Bumiputera voters	Non-Muslim Bumiputera voters	Voter turnout	Voter turnout %	Spoilt votes	Spoilt votes %
P126	Jelebu	Rais Yatim (BN–UMNO)	20,650	75.2%	Rosli Yaakop (BA–PAS)	5,870	21.4%	14,780	Rais Yatim (BN–UMNO)	37,716	61%	30%	7%				27,470	72.8%	860	3.1%
P127	Jempol	Mohd Isa Abdul Samad (BN–UMNO)	26,360	71.8%	Mohamad Fozi Mohd Zin (BA–PAS)	9,280	25.3%	17,080	Mohd. Khalid Mohd. Yunus (BN–UMNO)	50,553	57%	29%	14%				36,690	72.6%	1,050	2.9%
P128	Seremban	Hon Choon Kim (BN–MCA)	36,542	61.8%	Choong Yen Loong (DAP)	20,306	34.3%	16,236	Hon Choon Kim (BN–MCA)	81,704	39%	48%	12%				59,172	72.4%	2,190	3.7%
P129	Kuala Pilah	Hasan Malek (BN–UMNO)	22,105	69.6%	Annuar Mohd Salleh (BA–PKR)	8,763	27.6%	13,342	Napsiah Omar (BN–UMNO)	43,094	75%	18%	5%				31,778	73.7%	910	2.9%
P130	Rasah	Goh Siow Huat (BN–MCA)	25,009	52.0%	Chan Su Sann (DAP)	20,446	42.5%	4,563	Goh Siow Huat (BN–MCA)	65,152	27%	52%	21%				48,055	73.8%	1,294	2.7%
P131	Rembau	Firdaus Muhammad Rom Harun (BN–UMNO)	28,664	71.9%	Dzulkefly Ahmad (BA–PAS)	10,008	25.1%	18,656	New constituency	53,537	70%	15%	15%				39,866	74.5%	1,114	2.8%
P132	Telok Kemang	Sothinathan Sinna Goundar (BN–MIC)	28,494	69.2%	Ab Manap Sahardin (BA–PKR)	10,717	26.0%	17,777	Sothinathan Sinna Goundar (BN–MIC)	56,459	37%	38%	24%				41,189	73.0%	1,489	3.6%
P133	Tampin	Shaziman Abu Mansor (BN–UMNO)	23,936	77.8%	Abdul Razakek Abdul Rahim (BA–PAS)	5,852	19.0%	18,084	Shaziman Abu Mansor (BN–UMNO)	41,571	50%	34%	14%				30,778	74.0%	951	3.1%

== Malacca ==
#	Constituency	Winner	Votes	Votes %	Opponent(s)	Votes	Votes %	Majority	Incumbent	Eligible voters	Malay voters	Chinese voters	Indian voters	Others voters	Muslim Bumiputera voters	Non-Muslim Bumiputera voters	Voter turnout	Voter turnout %	Spoilt votes	Spoilt votes %
P134	Masjid Tanah	Abu Seman Yusop (BN–UMNO)	24,188	78.5%	Muhamad Burok (BA–PAS)	5,789	18.8%	18,399	New constituency	39,005	80%	15%	4%				30,807	79.0%	745	2.4%
P135	Alor Gajah	Fong Chan Onn (BN–MCA)	29,920	76.0%	Goh Leong San (DAP)	7,372	18.7%	22,548	Abu Seman Yusop (BN–UMNO)	51,588	55%	32%	13%				39,343	76.3%	1,941	4.9%
P136	Tangga Batu	Idris Haron (BN–UMNO)	33,039	76.9%	Shamsul Iskandar Md. Akin (BA–PKR)	8,595	20.0%	24,444	New constituency	53,291	67%	27%	4%				42,965	80.6%	1,321	3.1%
P137	Bukit Katil	Mohd Ruddin Abdul Ghani (BN–UMNO)	39,491	74.3%	Khalid Jaafar (PR–PKR)	12,239	23.0%	27,252	New constituency	66,034	51%	42%	6%				53,149	80.5%	1,334	2.5%
P138	Kota Melaka	Wong Nai Chee (BN–MCA)	31,217	48.5%	Kerk Kim Hock (DAP)	30,998	48.1%	219	Kerk Kim Hock (BA–DAP)	82,781	31%	64%	4%				64,391	77.8%	1,959	3.0%
P139	Jasin	Mohammad Said Yusof (BN–UMNO)	31,198	73.6%	Jasme Tompang (BA–PAS)	9,864	23.3%	21,334	Abu Zahar Ithnin (BN–UMNO)	53,218	68%	21%	11%				42,406	79.7%	1,249	3.0%

== Johor ==
#	Constituency	Winner	Votes	Votes %	Opponent(s)	Votes	Votes %	Majority	Incumbent	Eligible voters	Malay voters	Chinese voters	Indian voters	Others voters	Muslim Bumiputera voters	Non-Muslim Bumiputera voters	Voter turnout	Voter turnout %	Spoilt votes	Spoilt votes %
P140	Segamat	Subramaniam Sathasivam (BN–MIC)	17,953	62.0%	Pang Hok Liong (DAP)	10,144	35.0%	7,809	Subramaniam Sinniah (BN–MIC)	40,983	41%	48%	12%				28,974	70.7%	876	3.0%
P141	Sekijang	Baharum Mohamed (BN–UMNO)	19,628	80.4%	Zulkaply Salleh (BA–PKR)	4,786	19.6%	14,842	New constituency	33,594	54%	40%	6%				24,414	72.7%	0	0.0%
P142	Labis	Chua Soi Lek (BN–MCA)	16,469	71.4%	Tee Gey Yan (DAP)	5,740	24.9%	10,729	Ling Liong Sik (BN–MCA)	32,518	35%	49%	15%				23,073	71.0%	839	3.6%
P143	Pagoh	Muhyiddin Yassin (BN–UMNO)	23,679	80.2%	Mohamad Awang (BA–PAS)	4,932	16.7%	18,747	Muhyiddin Yassin (BN–UMNO)	40,172	62%	33%	4%				29,534	73.5%	881	3.0%
P144	Ledang	Hamim Samuri (BN–UMNO)	30,967	74.3%	Kasim Ibrahim (BA–PAS)	9,296	22.3%	21,671	Hashim Ismail (BN–UMNO)	57,175	53%	43%	4%				41,684	72.9%	1,362	3.3%
P145	Bakri	Chua Jui Meng (BN–MCA)	29,320	71.6%	Azhari Ismail (DAP)	10,261	25.1%	19,059	Chua Jui Meng (BN–MCA)	55,438	44%	54%	2%				40,939	73.9%	1,177	2.9%
P146	Muar	Razali Ibrahim (BN–UMNO)	21,116	70.9%	Mohamad Taib (BA–PAS)	7,701	25.9%	13,415	Robia Kosai (BN–UMNO)	42,130	62%	36%	2%				29,770	70.7%	872	2.9%
P147	Parit Sulong	Syed Hood Syed Edros (BN–UMNO)	26,974	70.8%	Suhaizan Kayat (BA–PAS)	9,788	25.7%	17,186	Ruhanie Ahmad (BN–UMNO)	50,134	72%	27%					38,116	76.0%	1,244	3.3%
P148	Ayer Hitam	Wee Ka Siong (BN–MCA)	20,065	79.6%	Mohd Zamri Mat Taksis (BA–PAS)	4,302	17.1%	15,763	New constituency	32,804	56%	40%	4%				25,218	76.9%	851	3.4%
P149	Sri Gading	Mohamad Aziz (BN–UMNO)	21,512	80.2%	Ahmad Faidi Saidi (BA–PKR)	5,316	19.8%	16,196	Mohamad Aziz (BN–UMNO)	35,807	66%	32%	2%				26,828	74.9%	0	0.0%
P150	Batu Pahat	Junaidy Abd Wahab (BN–UMNO)	38,982	77.6%	Mohamed Hanipa Maidin (BA–PAS)	9,880	19.7%	29,102	Siam Kasrin (BN–UMNO)	68,415	53%	45%	2%				50,234	73.4%	1,372	2.7%
P151	Simpang Renggam	Kerk Choo Ting (BN–Gerakan)	18,997	76.3%	Atan Gombang (BA–PAS)	4,842	19.5%	14,155	New constituency	34,240	54%	35%	11%				24,888	72.7%	907	3.6%
P152	Kluang	Hoo Seong Chang (BN–MCA)	33,001	66.5%	Ng Lam Hua (DAP)	14,303	28.8%	18,698	Hoo Seong Chang (BN–MCA)	67,475	36%	54%	9%				49,662	73.6%	1,477	3.0%
P153	Sembrong	Hishammuddin Hussein (BN–UMNO)	19,575	85.4%	Onn Jaafar (BA–PAS)	2,597	11.3%	16,978	New constituency	30,767	50%	39%	10%				22,932	74.6%	760	3.3%
P154	Mersing	Abdul Latiff Ahmad (BN–UMNO)	19,222	78.5%	Idris Tukachil (BA–PAS)	4,649	19.0%	14,573	Abdul Latiff Ahmad (BN–UMNO)	33,890	76%	21%	2%				24,484	72.3%	613	2.5%
P155	Tenggara	Adham Baba (BN–UMNO)	19,706	85.5%	Salleh Farmin (BA–PAS)	2,618	11.3%	17,088	Hishammuddin Hussein (BN–UMNO)	29,819	74%	18%	7%				23,056	77.3%	640	2.8%
P156	Kota Tinggi	Syed Hamid Albar (BN–UMNO)	0		Unopposed	0		0	Syed Hamid Albar (BN–UMNO)	33,262	83%	14%	3%							
P157	Pengerang	Azalina Othman Said (BN–UMNO)	0		Unopposed	0		0	New constituency	30,957	85%	14%								
P158	Tebrau	Teng Boon Soon (BN–MCA)	32,071	81.7%	Yaakob Mohd Yusof (BA–PAS)	6,060	15.4%	26,011	Mohd. Ali Hassan (BN–UMNO)	52,644	51%	35%	14%				39,261	74.6%	1,101	2.8%
P159	Pasir Gudang	Mohamed Khaled Nordin (BN–UMNO)	38,123	82.6%	A Razak Ahmad (BA–PKR)	7,002	15.2%	31,121	New constituency	61,171	47%	40%	12%				46,178	75.5%	907	2.0%
P160	Johor Bahru	Shahrir Abdul Samad (BN–UMNO)	54,073	86.6%	Atan Ahmad (BA–PAS)	7,281	11.7%	46,792	Mohamed Khaled Nordin (BN–UMNO)	91,108	50%	44%	5%				62,455	68.6%	1,100	1.8%
P161	Pulai	Nur Jazlan Mohamed (BN–UMNO)	42,406	83.2%	Nasir Wahab (BA–PAS)	7,480	14.7%	34,926	Abdul Kadir Annuar (BN–UMNO)	73,256	53%	38%	9%				50,948	69.6%	1,002	2.0%
P162	Gelang Patah	Tan Ah Eng (BN–MCA)	41,001	78.4%	Song Sing Kwee (BA–PKR)	9,335	17.8%	31,666	Chang See Ten (BN–MCA)	70,023	33%	55%	11%				52,297	74.7%	1,903	3.6%
P163	Kulai	Lim Si Cheng (BN–MCA)	32,278	66.7%	Ong Kow Meng (DAP)	14,134	29.2%	18,144	New constituency	62,273	32%	59%	9%				48,377	77.7%	1,935	4.0%
P164	Pontian	Hasni Mohammad (BN–UMNO)	26,667	79.7%	Hassan Abdul Karim (BA–PKR)	5,509	16.5%	21,158	Ong Ka Ting (BN–MCA)	44,377	68%	31%					33,460	75.4%	1,167	3.5%
P165	Tanjong Piai	Ong Ka Ting (BN–MCA)	28,046	82.6%	Tan Hang Meng (DAP)	4,431	13.1%	23,615	New constituency	44,575	51%	48%					33,938	76.1%	1,461	4.3%

== Federal Territory of Labuan ==
#	Constituency	Winner	Votes	Votes %	Opponent(s)	Votes	Votes %	Majority	Incumbent	Eligible voters	Malay voters	Chinese voters	Indian voters	Others voters	Muslim Bumiputera voters	Non-Muslim Bumiputera voters	Voter turnout	Voter turnout %	Spoilt votes	Spoilt votes %
P166	Labuan	Suhaili Abdul Rahman (BN–UMNO)	11,087	75.1%	Matusin Abdul Rahman (BA–PAS)	3,186	21.6%	7,901	Suhaili Abdul Rahman (BN–UMNO)	22,006			1%	12%	62%	25%	14,761	67.1%	488	3.3%

== Sabah ==
#	Constituency	Winner	Votes	Votes %	Opponent(s)	Votes	Votes %	Majority	Incumbent	Eligible voters	Malay voters	Chinese voters	Indian voters	Others voters	Muslim Bumiputera voters	Non-Muslim Bumiputera voters	Voter turnout	Voter turnout %	Spoilt votes	Spoilt votes %
P167	Kudat	Abdul Rahim Bakri (BN–UMNO)	13,236	54.2%	Abdul Rahman Sedik (IND)	6,488	26.5%	6,748	New constituency	37,089		15%			54%	31%	24,442	65.9%	1,061	4.3%
P167	Kudat	Abdul Rahim Bakri (BN–UMNO)	13,236	54.2%	Abdul Razak Abdul Salam (IND)	2,375	9.7%	6,748	New constituency	37,089		15%			54%	31%	24,442	65.9%	1,061	4.3%
P167	Kudat	Abdul Rahim Bakri (BN–UMNO)	13,236	54.2%	Asbiah Anggar (IND)	1,282	5.2%	6,748	New constituency	37,089		15%			54%	31%	24,442	65.9%	1,061	4.3%
P168	Kota Marudu	Maximus Johnity Ongkili (BN–PBS)	10,457	56.1%	Anthony Mandiau (IND)	7,268	39.0%	3,189	New constituency	28,111		3%			27%	70%	18,626	66.3%	901	4.8%
P169	Kota Belud	Salleh Said Keruak (BN–UMNO)	19,185	61.7%	James Bagah (IND)	8,956	28.8%	10,229	Salleh Said Keruak (BN–UMNO)	41,065		2%			59%	39%	31,100	75.7%	1,091	3.5%
P169	Kota Belud	Salleh Said Keruak (BN–UMNO)	19,185	61.7%	Jainin Giau (SETIA)	1,586	5.1%	10,229	Salleh Said Keruak (BN–UMNO)	41,065		2%			59%	39%	31,100	75.7%	1,091	3.5%
P170	Tuaran	Wilfred Madius Tangau (BN–UPKO)	17,722	65.0%	Ansari Abdullah (BA–PKR)	8,555	31.4%	9,167	Wilfred Madius Tangau (BN–UPKO)	39,338		8%			44%	49%	27,258	69.3%	981	3.6%
P171	Sepanggar	Eric Majimbun (BN–SAPP)	16,426	60.9%	Saidatul Badru Said (BA–PKR)	5,201	19.3%	11,225	New constituency	21,988		22%			49%	29%	26,990	63.7%	361	3.5%
P172	Kota Kinabalu	Yee Moh Chai (BN–PBS)	16,047	63.8%	Hiew King Chew (DAP)	5,187	20.6%	10,860	New constituency	43,121		78%			12%	9%	25,151	58.3%	294	1.2%
P172	Kota Kinabalu	Yee Moh Chai (BN–PBS)	16,047	63.8%	Christina Liew Chin Jin (BA–PKR)	3,511	14.0%	10,860	New constituency	43,121		78%			12%	9%	25,151	58.3%	294	1.2%
P173	Putatan	Marcus Mojigoh (BN–UPKO)	13,816	65.0%	Awang Ahmad Sah (BA–PKR)	5,984	28.2%	7,832	New constituency	34,123		24%			63%	13%	21,252	62.3%	725	3.4%
P174	Penampang	Donald Peter Mojuntin (BN–UPKO)	16,032	73.9%	Jomilon Mojuntin (DAP)	3,325	15.3%	12,707	Philip Benedict Lasimbang (BN–UPKO)	32,832		33%			11%	55%	21,680	66.0%	436	2.0%
P174	Penampang	Donald Peter Mojuntin (BN–UPKO)	16,032	73.9%	Joseph Sulaiman (IND)	960	4.4%	12,707	Philip Benedict Lasimbang (BN–UPKO)	32,832		33%			11%	55%	21,680	66.0%	436	2.0%
P174	Penampang	Donald Peter Mojuntin (BN–UPKO)	16,032	73.9%	Blaise Mosidin (BA–PKR)	927	4.3%	12,707	Philip Benedict Lasimbang (BN–UPKO)	32,832		33%			11%	55%	21,680	66.0%	436	2.0%
P175	Papar	Rosnah Abdul Rashid Shirlin (BN–UMNO)	0		Unopposed	0		0	Osu Sukam (BN–UMNO)	31,275		12%			63%	25%				
P176	Kimanis	Anifah Aman (BN–UMNO)	9,655	63.8%	Awang Tengah Awang Amin (BA–PKR)	4,547	30.1%	5,108	New constituency	21,576		7%			68%	25%	15,126	70.1%	500	3.3%
P177	Beaufort	Azizah Mohd Dun (BN–UMNO)	0		Unopposed	0		0	Anifah Aman (BN–UMNO)	26,461		12%			63%	26%				
P178	Sipitang	Yusof Yacob (BN–UMNO)	0		Unopposed	0		0	Yusof Yacob (BN–UMNO)	23,542		5%			81%	14%				
P179	Ranau	Bernard Giluk Dompok (BN–UPKO)	7,547	38.3%	Ruhimin Adzim (IND)	6,160	31.3%	1,387	New constituency	27,986		3%			39%	58%	19,699	70.4%	775	3.9%
P179	Ranau	Bernard Giluk Dompok (BN–UPKO)	7,547	38.3%	Karim Adam (IND)	3,310	16.8%	1,387	New constituency	27,986		3%			39%	58%	19,699	70.4%	775	3.9%
P179	Ranau	Bernard Giluk Dompok (BN–UPKO)	7,547	38.3%	Japiril Suhaimin (IND)	1,609	8.2%	1,387	New constituency	27,986		3%			39%	58%	19,699	70.4%	775	3.9%
P180	Keningau	Joseph Pairin Kitingan (BN–PBS)	0		Unopposed	0		0	Joseph Pairin Kitingan (PBS)	34,510		11%			24%	65%				
P181	Tenom	Raime Unggi (BN–UMNO)	8,032	57.1%	Laimun Laikin (IND)	5,628	40.0%	2,404	Rizalman Abdullah (BN–UMNO)	20,417		17%			25%	57%	14,063	68.9%	396	2.8%
P182	Pensiangan	Bernard S. Maraat (BN–PBRS)	5,880	47.9%	Martin Tommy (IND)	5,272	43.0%	608	New constituency	18,075		2%			12%	85%	12,271	67.9%	562	4.6%
P182	Pensiangan	Bernard S. Maraat (BN–PBRS)	5,880	47.9%	Razali Suffian Koroh (SETIA)	557	4.5%	608	New constituency	18,075		2%			12%	85%	12,271	67.9%	562	4.6%
P183	Beluran	Ronald Kiandee (BN–UMNO)	0		Unopposed	0		0	Ronald Kiandee (BN–UMNO)	18,960		2%			61%	37%				
P184	Libaran	Juslie Ajirol (BN–UMNO)	13,140	79.7%	Raj Munni Sabu (BA–PKR)	2,471	15.0%	10,669	Juslie Ajirol (BN–UMNO)	26,888		23%			72%	5%	16,484	61.3%	804	4.9%
P185	Batu Sapi	Edmund Chong Ket Wah (BN–PBS)	0		Unopposed	0		0	New constituency	26,504		37%			60%	2%				
P186	Sandakan	Chong Hon Min (IND)	9,538	50.7%	Liew Vui Keong (BN–LDP)	8,208	43.7%	1,330	Lau Ngan Siew (BN–LDP)	33,208		61%			35%	4%	18,798	56.6%	385	2.1%
P186	Sandakan	Chong Hon Min (IND)	9,538	50.7%	Liew Teck Khen (PASOK)	543	2.9%	1,330	Lau Ngan Siew (BN–LDP)	33,208		61%			35%	4%	18,798	56.6%	385	2.1%
P187	Kinabatangan	Bung Moktar Radin (BN–UMNO)	0		Unopposed	0		0	Bung Moktar Radin (BN–UMNO)	19,441					92%	6%				
P188	Silam	Samsu Baharom Abdul Rahman (BN–UMNO)	16,613	68.8%	Shamsuri Baharuddin (BA–PKR)	5,865	24.3%	10,748	Railey Jeffrey (BN–UMNO)	40,362		14%			72%	12%	24,141	59.8%	1,517	6.3%
P189	Semporna	Mohd Shafie Apdal (BN–UMNO)	13,970	73.2%	Madjalis Lais (IND)	1,704	8.9%	12,266	Mohd Shafie Apdal (BN–UMNO)	33,772		3%			93%	5%	19,086	56.5%	770	4.0%
P189	Semporna	Mohd Shafie Apdal (BN–UMNO)	13,970	73.2%	Aldani Landi (IND)	1,162	6.1%	12,266	Mohd Shafie Apdal (BN–UMNO)	33,772		3%			93%	5%	19,086	56.5%	770	4.0%
P189	Semporna	Mohd Shafie Apdal (BN–UMNO)	13,970	73.2%	Noraidah Abdul Salleh (IND)	764	4.0%	12,266	Mohd Shafie Apdal (BN–UMNO)	33,772		3%			93%	5%	19,086	56.5%	770	4.0%
P189	Semporna	Mohd Shafie Apdal (BN–UMNO)	13,970	73.2%	Mohd Abdul Wahab Pg Abdullah (BA–PKR)	676	3.5%	12,266	Mohd Shafie Apdal (BN–UMNO)	33,772		3%			93%	5%	19,086	56.5%	770	4.0%
P190	Tawau	Shim Paw Fatt (BN–SAPP)	0		Unopposed	0		0	Shim Paw Fatt (BN–SAPP)	41,143		44%			51%	4%				
P191	Kalabakan	Abdul Ghapur Salleh (BN–UMNO)	0		Unopposed	0		0	New constituency	34,617		13%			78%	8%				

== Sarawak ==
#	Constituency	Winner	Votes	Votes %	Opponent(s)	Votes	Votes %	Majority	Incumbent	Eligible voters	Malay voters	Chinese voters	Indian voters	Others voters	Muslim Bumiputera voters	Non-Muslim Bumiputera voters	Voter turnout	Voter turnout %	Spoilt votes	Spoilt votes %
P192	Mas Gading	Tiki Lafe (BN–SPDP)	10,579	56.4%	Patau Rubis (SNAP)	7,867	41.9%	2,712	Tiki Lafe (BN–SPDP)	28,800		19%			13%	68%	18,755	65.1%	218	1.2%
P193	Santubong	Wan Junaidi Tuanku Jaafar (BN–PBB)	12,590	84.5%	Idris Bohari (IND)	2,030	13.6%	10,560	Rohani Abdul Karim (BN–PBB)	23,238		8%			83%	9%	14,902	64.1%	244	1.6%
P194	Petra Jaya	Fadillah Yusof (BN–PBB)	18,236	75.4%	Wan Zainal Abidin Wan Senusi (BA–PKR)	5,420	22.4%	12,816	Sulaiman Daud (BN–PBB)	39,365		12%			79%	8%	24,195	61.5%	292	1.2%
P195	Bandar Kuching	Chong Chieng Jen (DAP)	17,914	51.6%	Wee Kok Tiong (BN–SUPP)	15,873	45.8%	2,041	Song Swee Guan (BN–SUPP)	55,012		91%			5%	3%	34,693	63.1%	577	1.7%
P196	Stampin	Yong Khoon Seng (BN–SUPP)	21,155	59.1%	Voon Lee Shan (DAP)	13,424	37.5%	7,731	Yong Khoon Seng (BN–SUPP)	59,809		73%			13%	13%	35,806	59.9%	529	1.5%
P197	Kota Samarahan	Abdul Taib Mahmud (BN–PBB)	0		Unopposed	0		0	Abdul Taib Mahmud (BN–PBB)	27,628		12%			65%	22%				
P198	Mambong	James Dawos Mamit (BN–PBB)	15,368	69.6%	Mangan Ngandok (STAR)	6,270	28.4%	9,098	James Dawos Mamit (BN–PBB)	35,650		27%			12%	61%	22,089	62.0%	451	2.0%
P199	Serian	Richard Riot Jaem (BN–SUPP)	13,960	74.7%	Henry Ginai Langgie (IND)	4,265	22.8%	9,695	Richard Riot Jaem (BN–SUPP)	31,601		11%			15%	75%	18,686	59.1%	372	2.0%
P200	Batang Sadong	Adenan Satem (BN–PBB)	10,767	90.0%	Adam Ahid (BA–PAS)	1,035	8.6%	9,732	Sukinam Domo (BN–PBB)	18,496		6%			74%	21%	11,969	64.7%	167	1.4%
P201	Batang Lupar	Rohani Abdul Karim (BN–PBB)	0		Unopposed	0		0	Wan Junaidi Tuanku Jaafar (BN–PBB)	19,027		3%			77%	20%				
P202	Sri Aman	Jimmy Donald Lim (BN–PBDS)	9,679	62.4%	Cobbold Lusoi (IND)	5,311	34.3%	4,368	Jimmy Donald Lim (BN–PRS)	28,015		17%			20%	63%	15,500	55.3%	316	2.0%
P203	Lubok Antu	Jawah Gerang (BN–PBDS)	6,962	57.4%	William Nyallau Badak (IND)	4,927	40.6%	2,035	Jawah Gerang (BN–PRS)	17,647		8%			18%	74%	12,139	68.8%	232	1.9%
P204	Betong	Douglas Uggah Embas (BN–PBB)	11,618	84.9%	Abang Zulkifli Abang Engkeh (SNAP)	1,895	13.8%	9,723	Douglas Uggah Embas (BN–PBB)	20,737		7%			50%	43%	13,689	66.0%	176	1.3%
P205	Saratok	Jelaing Mersat (BN–SPDP)	11,995	71.9%	Edmond Stanley Jugol (SNAP)	4,450	26.7%	7,545	Peter Tinggom Kamarau (BN–SNAP)	24,607		7%			44%	49%	16,684	67.8%	229	1.4%
P206	Kuala Rajang	Wahab Dolah (BN–PBB)	0		Unopposed	0		0	Mohd Effendi Norwawi (BN–PBB)	17,052		5%			74%	20%				
P207	Sarikei	Law Hieng Ding (BN–SUPP)	15,485	69.8%	Ngu Tieng Hai (IND)	3,886	17.5%	11,599	Law Hieng Ding (BN–SUPP)	35,880		66%			11%	23%	22,173	61.8%	237	1.1%
P207	Sarikei	Law Hieng Ding (BN–SUPP)	15,485	69.8%	Ling Bit Tiing (IND)	1,667	7.5%	11,599	Law Hieng Ding (BN–SUPP)	35,880		66%			11%	23%	22,173	61.8%	237	1.1%
P207	Sarikei	Law Hieng Ding (BN–SUPP)	15,485	69.8%	Junak Jawek (IND)	864	3.9%	11,599	Law Hieng Ding (BN–SUPP)	35,880		66%			11%	23%	22,173	61.8%	237	1.1%
P208	Julau	Joseph Salang Gandum (BN–PBDS)	8,388	57.8%	Ambrose Labang Jamba (IND)	5,700	39.3%	2,688	Joseph Salang Gandum (BN–PRS)	19,765		5%			12%	83%	14,521	73.5%	176	1.2%
P209	Kanowit	Aaron Ago Dagang (BN–PBDS)	6,438	58.4%	Frederick Bungsu Jantan (IND)	4,381	39.7%	2,057	Leo Moggie Irok (BN–PRS)	18,181		12%			16%	72%	11,022	60.6%	185	1.7%
P210	Lanang	Tiong Thai King (BN–SUPP)	14,895	58.7%	David Wong Kee Woan (DAP)	10,174	40.1%	4,721	Tiong Thai King (BN–SUPP)	40,100		72%			10%	18%	25,374	63.3%	252	1.0%
P211	Sibu	Robert Lau Hoi Chew (BN–SUPP)	20,501	53.6%	Wong Ho Leng (DAP)	17,161	44.9%	3,340	Robert Lau Hoi Chew (BN–SUPP)	60,832		65%			20%	15%	38,216	62.8%	430	1.1%
P212	Mukah	Leo Michael Toyad (BN–PBB)	11,829	79.7%	Mohamad @ Latip Rahman (IND)	2,651	17.9%	9,178	Leo Michael Toyad (BN–PBB)	25,853		10%			75%	16%	14,849	57.4%	341	2.3%
P213	Selangau	Joseph Entulu Belaun (BN–PBDS)	7,876	63.6%	Liman Sujang (SNAP)	4,260	34.4%	3,616	Joseph Mauh Ikeh (BN–PRS)	20,459		4%			13%	83%	12,376	60.5%	237	1.9%
P214	Kapit	Alexander Nanta Linggi (BN–PBB)	0		Unopposed	0		0	Alexander Nanta Linggi (BN–PBB)	23,330		10%			22%	68%				
P215	Hulu Rajang	Billy Abit Joo (BN–PBDS)	6,949	66.7%	Bendindang Manjah (SNAP)	3,283	31.5%	3,666	Billy Abit Joo (BN–PRS)	17,185				2%	20%	77%	10,416	60.6%	171	1.6%
P216	Bintulu	Tiong King Sing (BN–SPDP)	20,225	63.1%	Chiew Chiu Sing (DAP)	8,958	27.9%	11,267	Tiong King Sing (BN–SPDP)	49,374		28%			29%	44%	32,067	65.0%	288	0.9%
P216	Bintulu	Tiong King Sing (BN–SPDP)	20,225	63.1%	Lau Hing Kii (SNAP)	2,583	8.1%	11,267	Tiong King Sing (BN–SPDP)	49,374		28%			29%	44%	32,067	65.0%	288	0.9%
P217	Miri	Peter Chin Fah Kui (BN–SUPP)	0		Unopposed	0		0	Peter Chin Fah Kui (BN–SUPP)	74,266		57%			26%	17%				
P218	Baram	Jacob Dungau Sagan (BN–SPDP)	7,551	63.1%	Kebing Wan (SNAP)	4,241	35.4%	3,310	Jacob Dungau Sagan (BN–SPDP)	25,361		9%			21%	70%	11,973	47.2%	165	1.4%
P219	Bukit Mas	Henry Sum Agong (BN–PBB)	0		Unopposed	0		0	Henry Sum Agong (BN–PBB)	35,865		57%			26%	17%				
