= List of female cabinet ministers of Malaysia =

The Cabinet of Malaysia has had 18 female cabinet ministers. 32 female deputy ministers and 14 female parliamentary secretaries has had assist the Ministers.

== Ministers ==
No.	Minister	Position	Year Appointed	Administration
1	Fatimah Hashim	Minister of Social Welfare	1969	Tunku Abdul Rahman
(1)	Fatimah Hashim	Minister of Social Welfare	1970	Abdul Razak Hussein
2	Aishah Ghani	Minister of General Welfare	1973	Abdul Razak Hussein
(2)	Aishah Ghani	Minister of General Welfare	1976	Hussein Onn
3	Rafidah Aziz	Minister of Public Enterprises	1980	Hussein Onn
(2)	Aishah Ghani	Minister of General Welfare	1981	Mahathir Mohamad
(3)	Rafidah Aziz	Minister of Public Enterprises	1981	Mahathir Mohamad
4	Napsiah Omar	Minister of Public Enterprises	1987	Mahathir Mohamad
(3)	Rafidah Aziz	Minister of Commerce and Industry	1987	Mahathir Mohamad
(4)	Napsiah Omar	Minister of National Unity and Social Development	1990	Mahathir Mohamad
(3)	Rafidah Aziz	Minister of International Trade and Industry	1990	Mahathir Mohamad
5	Zaleha Ismail	Minister of National Unity and Social Development	1995	Mahathir Mohamad
6	Siti Zaharah Sulaiman	Minister in the Prime Minister's Department	1999	Mahathir Mohamad
(6)	Siti Zaharah Sulaiman	Minister of National Unity and Social Development	1999	Mahathir Mohamad
7	Shahrizat Abdul Jalil	Minister of Women and Family Development	2001	Mahathir Mohamad
(3)	Rafidah Aziz	Minister of International Trade and Industry	2003	Abdullah Ahmad Badawi
(7)	Shahrizat Abdul Jalil	Minister of Women, Family and Community Development	2003	Abdullah Ahmad Badawi
(6)	Siti Zaharah Sulaiman	Minister of National Unity and Social Development	2003	Abdullah Ahmad Badawi
8	Azalina Othman Said	Minister of Youth and Sports	2004	Abdullah Ahmad Badawi
(8)	Azalina Othman Said	Minister of Tourism	2008	Abdullah Ahmad Badawi
9	Ng Yen Yen	Minister of Women, Family and Community Development	2008	Abdullah Ahmad Badawi
(9)	Ng Yen Yen	Minister of Tourism	2009	Najib Razak
(7)	Shahrizat Abdul Jalil	Minister of Women, Family and Community Development	2009	Najib Razak
10	Nancy Shukri	Minister in the Prime Minister's Department	2013	Najib Razak
11	Rohani Abdul Karim	Minister of Women, Family and Community Development	2013	Najib Razak
(8)	Azalina Othman Said	Minister in the Prime Minister's Department	2015	Najib Razak
12	Wan Azizah Wan Ismail	Deputy Prime Minister	2018	Mahathir Mohamad
(12)	Wan Azizah Wan Ismail	Minister of Women and Family Development	2018	Mahathir Mohamad
13	Zuraida Kamaruddin	Minister of Housing and Local Government	2018	Mahathir Mohamad
14	Rina Harun	Minister of Rural Development	2018	Mahathir Mohamad
15	Yeo Bee Yin	Minister of Energy, Technology, Science, Climate Change and Environment	2018	Mahathir Mohamad
16	Teresa Kok	Minister of Primary Industries	2018	Mahathir Mohamad
(10)	Nancy Shukri	Minister of Tourism, Arts and Culture	2020	Muhyiddin Yassin
(13)	Zuraida Kamaruddin	Minister of Housing and Local Government	2020	Muhyiddin Yassin
(14)	Rina Harun	Minister of Women and Family Development	2020	Muhyiddin Yassin
17	Halimah Mohamed Sadique	Minister of National Unity	2020	Muhyiddin Yassin
18	Noraini Ahmad	Minister of Higher Education	2020	Muhyiddin Yassin
(10)	Nancy Shukri	Minister of Tourism, Arts and Culture	2021	Ismail Sabri Yaakob
(18)	Noraini Ahmad	Minister of Higher Education	2021	Ismail Sabri Yaakob
(13)	Zuraida Kamaruddin	Minister of Plantation Industries and Commodities	2021	Ismail Sabri Yaakob
(14)	Rina Harun	Minister of Women, Family and Community Development	2021	Ismail Sabri Yaakob
(17)	Halimah Mohamed Sadique	Minister of National Unity	2021	Ismail Sabri Yaakob
(8)	Azalina Othman Said	Minister in the Prime Minister's Department	2022	Anwar Ibrahim
(10)	Nancy Shukri	Minister of Women, Family and Community Development	2022	Anwar Ibrahim
19	Hannah Yeoh	Minister of Youth and Sports	2022	Anwar Ibrahim
20	Fadhlina Sidek	Minister of Education	2022	Anwar Ibrahim
21	Zaliha Mustafa	Minister of Health	2022	Anwar Ibrahim

== Deputy ministers ==
No.	Deputy Minister	Position	Year Appointed	Administration
1	Rafidah Aziz	Deputy Minister of Finance	1977	Hussein Onn
2	Napsiah Omar	Deputy Minister of Housing and Local Government	1982	Mahathir Mohamad
3	Rahmah Othman	Deputy Minister of Information	1982	Mahathir Mohamad
4	Rosemary Chow Poh Kheng	Deputy Minister of Culture, Youth and Sports	1982	Mahathir Mohamad
5	Shariffah Dorah Syed Mohammed	Deputy Minister in the Prime Minister's Department	1982	Mahathir Mohamad
(3)	Rahmah Othman	Deputy Minister of Transport	1984	Mahathir Mohamad
6	Siti Zaharah Sulaiman	Deputy Minister in the Prime Minister's Department	1986	Mahathir Mohamad
7	Teng Gaik Kwan	Deputy Minister of Youth and Sports	1987	Mahathir Mohamad
8	Zaleha Ismail	Deputy Minister of Transport	1987	Mahathir Mohamad
(6)	Siti Zaharah Sulaiman	Deputy Minister of Public Enterprises	1990	Mahathir Mohamad
(6)	Siti Zaharah Sulaiman	Deputy Minister of Health	1995	Mahathir Mohamad
(7)	Teng Gaik Kwan	Deputy Minister of Culture, Arts and Tourism	1995	Mahathir Mohamad
9	Siti Zainabon Abu Bakar	Deputy Minister of Primary Industries	1995	Mahathir Mohamad
10	Shahrizat Abdul Jalil	Deputy Minister in the Prime Minister's Department	1999	Mahathir Mohamad
11	Ng Yen Yen	Deputy Minister of Culture, Arts and Tourism	1999	Mahathir Mohamad
(11)	Ng Yen Yen	Deputy Minister of Finance	2001	Mahathir Mohamad
(11)	Ng Yen Yen	Deputy Minister of Finance	2003	Abdullah Ahmad Badawi
12	Azizah Mohd Dun	Deputy Minister of Housing and Local Government	2004	Abdullah Ahmad Badawi
13	Khamsiyah Yeop	Deputy Minister of Entrepreneur and Co-operatives Development	2004	Abdullah Ahmad Badawi
14	Mashitah Ibrahim	Deputy Minister in the Prime Minister's Department	2008	Abdullah Ahmad Badawi
15	Maznah Mazlan	Deputy Minister of Natural Resources and Environment	2008	Abdullah Ahmad Badawi
16	Noraini Ahmad	Deputy Minister of Human Resources	2008	Abdullah Ahmad Badawi
17	Noriah Kasnon	Deputy Minister of Women, Family and Community Development	2008	Abdullah Ahmad Badawi
18	Rohani Abdul Karim	Deputy Minister of Agriculture and Agro-based Industry	2008	Abdullah Ahmad Badawi
19	Tan Lian Hoe	Deputy Minister of Information	2008	Abdullah Ahmad Badawi
20	Chew Mei Fun	Deputy Minister of Women, Family and Community Development	2009	Najib Razak
21	Heng Seai Kie	Deputy Minister of Information, Communications, Arts and Culture	2009	Najib Razak
(14)	Mashitah Ibrahim	Deputy Minister in the Prime Minister's Department	2009	Najib Razak
(15)	Maznah Mazlan	Deputy Minister of Human Resources	2009	Najib Razak
(17)	Noriah Kasnon	Deputy Minister of Energy, Green Technology and Water	2009	Najib Razak
(18)	Rohani Abdul Karim	Deputy Minister of Agriculture and Agro-based Industry	2009	Najib Razak
22	Rosnah Abdul Rashid Shirlin	Deputy Minister of Health	2009	Najib Razak
(19)	Tan Lian Hoe	Deputy Minister of Domestic Trade and Consumer Affairs	2009	Najib Razak
(21)	Heng Seai Kie	Deputy Minister of Women, Family and Community Development	2010	Najib Razak
(18)	Rohani Abdul Karim	Deputy Minister of Domestic Trade, Co-operatives and Consumerism	2010	Najib Razak
(19)	Tan Lian Hoe	Deputy Minister of Domestic Trade, Co-operatives and Consumerism	2010	Najib Razak
(12)	Azizah Mohd Dun	Deputy Minister of Women, Family and Community Development	2013	Najib Razak
23	Halimah Mohamed Sadique	Deputy Minister of Urban Wellbeing, Housing and Local Government	2013	Najib Razak
24	Mary Yap Kain Ching	Deputy Minister of Education	2013	Najib Razak
(17)	Noriah Kasnon	Deputy Minister of Plantation Industries and Commodities	2013	Najib Razak
(22)	Rosnah Abdul Rashid Shirlin	Deputy Minister of Works	2013	Najib Razak
(24)	Mary Yap Kain Ching	Deputy Minister of Higher Education	2015	Najib Razak
25	Mas Ermieyati Samsudin	Deputy Minister of Tourism and Culture	2015	Najib Razak
26	Fuziah Salleh	Deputy Minister in the Prime Minister's Department for Religious Affairs	2018	Mahathir Mohamad
27	Hannah Yeoh	Deputy Minister of Women, Family and Community Development	2018	Mahathir Mohamad
28	Teo Nie Ching	Deputy Minister of Education	2018	Mahathir Mohamad
29	Isnaraissah Munirah Majilis	Deputy Minister of Energy, Technology, Science, Climate Change and Environment	2018	Mahathir Mohamad
(25)	Mas Ermieyati Samsudin	Deputy Minister of Entrepreneur Development And Co-operatives	2020	Muhyiddin Yassin
30	Hanifah Hajar Taib	Deputy Minister in the Prime Minister's Department (Sabah and Sarawak Affairs)	2020	Muhyiddin Yassin
31	Mastura Mohd Yazid	Deputy Minister in the Prime Minister's Department (Special Functions	2020	Muhyiddin Yassin
32	Siti Zailah Mohd Yusoff	Deputy Minister of Women, Family and Community Development	2020	Muhyiddin Yassin
(31)	Mastura Mohd Yazid	Deputy Minister in the Prime Minister's Department (Special Functions)	2021	Ismail Sabri Yaakob
(25)	Mas Ermieyati Samsudin	Deputy Minister in the Prime Minister's Department (Parliament and Law)	2021	Ismail Sabri Yaakob
(30)	Hanifah Hajar Taib	Deputy Minister in the Prime Minister's Department (Sabah and Sarawak Affairs)	2021	Ismail Sabri Yaakob
(32)	Siti Zailah Mohd Yusoff	Deputy Minister of Women, Family and Community Development	2021	Ismail Sabri Yaakob
(30)	Hanifah Hajar Taib	Deputy Minister of Economy	2022	Anwar Ibrahim
(26)	Fuziah Salleh	Deputy Minister of Domestic Trade and Costs of Living	2022	Anwar Ibrahim
(28)	Teo Nie Ching	Deputy Minister of Communications and Digital	2022	Anwar Ibrahim
33	Lim Hui Ying	Deputy Minister of Education	2022	Anwar Ibrahim
34	Saraswathy Kandasami	Deputy Minister of Entrepreneur Development and Cooperatives	2022	Anwar Ibrahim
35	Rubiah Wang	Deputy Minister of Rural and Regional Development	2022	Anwar Ibrahim
36	Siti Aminah Aching	Deputy Minister of Plantation and Commodities	2022	Anwar Ibrahim
37	Aiman Athirah Sabu	Deputy Minister of Women, Family and Community Development	2022	Anwar Ibrahim

== Parliamentary secretaries ==
No.	Parliamentary secretaries	Position	Year Appointed	Administration
1	Rosemary Chow Poh Kheng	Parliamentary Secretary to the Minister of Health	1980	Hussein Onn
(1)	Rosemary Chow Poh Kheng	Parliamentary Secretary to the Minister of Health	1981	Mahathir Mohamad
2	Shariffah Dorah Syed Mohammed	Parliamentary Secretary to the Minister of Lands and Regional Development	1981	Mahathir Mohamad
3	Teng Gaik Kwan	Parliamentary Secretary to the Minister of Health	1986	Mahathir Mohamad
4	Zaleha Ismail	Parliamentary Secretary to the Minister of Lands and Regional Development	1986	Mahathir Mohamad
5	Shahrizat Abdul Jalil	Parliamentary Secretary to the Minister of Youth and Sports	1995	Mahathir Mohamad
6	Ainon Khairiyah Mohd. Abas	Parliamentary Secretary to the Minister of Lands and Co-operatives Development	1999	Mahathir Mohamad
7	Khamsiyah Yeop	Parliamentary Secretary to the Prime Minister's Department	1999	Mahathir Mohamad
8	Robia Kosai	Parliamentary Secretary to the Minister of Lands and Co-operatives Development	1999	Mahathir Mohamad
9	Rohani Abdul Karim	Parliamentary Secretary to the Minister of Rural Development	1999	Mahathir Mohamad
10	Mastika Junaidah Husin	Parliamentary Secretary to the Minister of Women and Family Development	2001	Mahathir Mohamad
(7)	Khamsiyah Yeop	Parliamentary Secretary to the Prime Minister's Department	2003	Abdullah Ahmad Badawi
(10)	Mastika Junaidah Husin	Parliamentary Secretary to the Minister of Women and Family Development	2003	Abdullah Ahmad Badawi
(8)	Robia Kosai	Parliamentary Secretary to the Minister of Lands and Co-operatives Development	2003	Abdullah Ahmad Badawi
(9)	Rohani Abdul Karim	Parliamentary Secretary to the Minister of Rural Development	2003	Abdullah Ahmad Badawi
11	Chew Mei Fun	Parliamentary Secretary to the Minister of Women, Family and Community Development	2004	Abdullah Ahmad Badawi
12	Mashitah Ibrahim	Parliamentary Secretary to the Prime Minister's Department	2004	Abdullah Ahmad Badawi
13	Noriah Kasnon	Parliamentary Secretary to the Minister of Information	2004	Abdullah Ahmad Badawi
14	P. Komala Devi	Parliamentary Secretary to the Minister of Education	2004	Abdullah Ahmad Badawi
(9)	Rohani Abdul Karim	Parliamentary Secretary to the Minister of Agriculture and Agro-based Industry	2004	Abdullah Ahmad Badawi

== See also ==
- List of the first female holders of political offices in Asia
