= Baharuddin =

Baharuddin may refer to:

== First name ==
- Baharuddin Abdul Latif, Malaysian politician
- Baharuddin Lopa (1935-2001), Indonesian Minister of Justice and Human Rights

== Surname ==
- Hasnul Baharuddin, Malaysian politician

== Places ==
- Baharuddin Siregar Stadium, a multi-use stadium in Lubuk Pakam, Indonesia
