= Wan Mohamed Wan Teh =

Malaysian politician

Yang Berbahagia Dato' Seri Haji Wan Mohamed Wan Teh SPCM PCM PJK JP
- وان محمد وان تيه

7th Menteri Besar of Perak
- In office 1 October 1977 – 1 March 1983
- Preceded by: Mohamed Ghazali Jawi
- Succeeded by: Ramli Ngah Talib

Personal details
- Born: Wan Mohamed bin Wan Teh; 1929 Gerik, Perak
- Died: 25 August 1993 (aged 63–64) Gerik, Perak
- Citizenship: Malaysian
- Party: UMNO
- Other political affiliations: Barisan Nasional
- Relations: Wan Hashim Wan Teh (brother)
- Education: Malay College Kuala Kangsar
- Occupation: Politician

Wan Mohamed bin Wan Teh (1929 – 25 August 1993) was the 7th Menteri Besar of Perak from 1 October 1977 to 1 March 1983. He was also the Member of Perak State Legislative Assembly for Grik from 1969 to 1974, Temengor from 1974 to 1978 and Kenering from 1978 to 1983.

== Personal life ==
Wan Mohammed was born to Haji Wan Teh and Hajah Kalsom in 1929 at Kampung Ulu Kenderong, Gerik, Perak. His brother, Wan Hashim Wan Teh was the Member of Parliament for Gerik from 2004 to 2008 whilst another brother, Wan Zahidi Wan Teh was the Mufti of the Federal Territories from 2006 to 2014 and the current Mufti of Perak since 2022.

== Politics ==
When Wan Mohammed was 17 years old, he had joined some assemblies of Malayan Union in Kuala Kangsar. He joined UMNO in 1951 and joined the Kuala Kangsar branch. Wan Mohammed was chosen as the candidate to participate in the 1969 Malaysian general election for the Grik state seat. He won the seat and was unopposed in the 1974 Malaysian general election. He was chosen as an EXCO after that.

In 1977, Ghazali Jawi resigned from the post of Menteri Besar of Perak. Wan Mohamed was subsequently appointed as the Menteri Besar of Perak to replace Ghazali Jawi. His first mission was to fix the relationship between UMNO and the royal family, if not many problems cannot be solved as the Sultan has controls over Islamic issues and the land in Perak.

There are a few people from Orang-Orang Besar Perak had influenced Sultan Idris Shah that Wan Mohammed was a Malay of Pattani descent. Not long after that, he was forced to quit as the Menteri Besar of Perak.

== Death ==
Wan Mohammed died of lung cancer on 25 August 1993 in his own house.

== Election results ==
Perak State Legislative Assembly
| Year | Constituency | Candidate | Votes | Pct | Opponent(s) | Votes | Pct | Ballots cast | Majority | Turnout |
|---|---|---|---|---|---|---|---|---|---|---|
| 1969 | N01 Grik | Wan Mohamed Wan Teh (UMNO) | 6,687 | 72.41% | Md Arif Yaacob (PMIP) | 2,548 | 27.59% | 10,170 | 4,139 | 78.18% |
| 1974 | N01 Temengor | Wan Mohamed Wan Teh (UMNO) | Unopposed | | | | | | | |
| 1978 | N02 Kenering | Wan Mohamed Wan Teh (UMNO) | | | | | | | | |
| 1982 | N02 Kenering | Wan Mohamed Wan Teh (UMNO) | | | | | | | | |

== Honours ==
- Perak
  - Knight Grand Commander of the Order of Cura Si Manja Kini (SPCM) (1978)
  - Commander of the Order of Cura Si Manja Kini (PCM) (1976)
  - Recipient of the Meritorious Service Medal (PJK)
  - Justice of the Peace (JP)
