= Razman Zakaria =

Malaysian politician

Yang Berhormat Tuan Razman Zakaria MLA
- رازمان زكريا

State Leader of the Opposition of Perak
- Incumbent
- Assumed office 9 December 2022; Suspended : 16 April 2025 – 15 October 2025
- Monarch: Nazrin Shah
- Menteri Besar: Saarani Mohamad
- Preceded by: Abdul Aziz Bari
- Constituency: Gunong Semanggol

Member of the Perak State Executive Council
- In office 15 December 2020 – 21 November 2022
- Monarch: Nazrin Shah
- Menteri Besar: Saarani Mohamad
- Portfolio: Plantations, Agriculture and Food Industry
- Preceded by: Abdul Yunus Jamahri
- Succeeded by: Mohd Zolkafly Harun
- Constituency: Gunong Semanggol
- In office 31 March 2020 – 5 December 2020
- Monarch: Nazrin Shah
- Menteri Besar: Ahmad Faizal Azumu
- Portfolio: Education, Human Capital Development, Non-Governmental Organisations and Civil Community
- Preceded by: Abdul Aziz Bari (Education); Howard Lee Chuan How (Human Capital Development); Hasnul Zulkarnain Abdul Munaim (Non-Governmental Organisations); Sivanesan Achalingam (Civil Community)
- Succeeded by: Ahmad Saidi Mohamad Daud (Education and Human Capital Development); Wan Norashikin Wan Noordin (Non-Governmental Organisation); Abdul Yunus Jamahri (Civil Community)
- Constituency: Gunong Semanggol

Member of the Perak State Legislative Assembly for Gunong Semanggol
- Incumbent
- Assumed office 9 May 2018; Suspended : 16 April 2025 – 15 October 2025
- Preceded by: Mohd Zawawi Abu Hassan (PAS)
- Majority: 1,903 (2018); 7,466 (2022)

Personal details
- Born: Razman bin Zakaria; 16 February 1960 (age 66) Perak, Malaysia
- Citizenship: Malaysian
- Party: Malaysian Islamic Party (PAS)
- Other political affiliations: Gagasan Sejahtera (GS) (2016–2020); Perikatan Nasional (PN) (since 2020)
- Occupation: Politician

Razman bin Zakaria (born 16 February 1960) is a Malaysian politician who has served as State Leader of the Opposition of Perak since December 2022 and Member of the Perak State Legislative Assembly (MLA) for Gunong Semanggol since May 2018. He served as Member of the Perak State Executive Council (EXCO) in the Perikatan Nasional (PN) state administration under former Menteri Besar Ahmad Faizal Azumu briefly from March 2020 to the collapse of the PN administration in December 2020 and again from in the Barisan Nasional (BN) state administration under Menteri Besar Saarani Mohamad from December 2020 to November 2022. He is a member of the Malaysian Islamic Party (PAS), a component party of the PN coalition, and was the party's State Commissioner in Perak until his suspension from the role in 2025. He has been suspended as both the State Leader of the Opposition of Perak and Gunong Semanggol MLA since 16 April 2025 for six months. His suspension is set to expire on 15 October 2025. He also holds the role of Deputy Chairman of PN in the state. An opposition leader, he is known for making defamatory, misleading and false statements.

== Election results ==
Parliament of Malaysia
Year	Constituency	Candidate	Votes	Pct	Opponent(s)	Votes	Pct	Ballots cast	Majority	Turnout
2013	P055 Lenggong	Razman Zakaria (PAS)	9,832	42.53%	Shamsul Anuar Nasarah (UMNO)	13,285	57.47%	23,736	3,453	84.92%

Perak State Legislative Assembly
Year	Constituency	Candidate	Votes	Pct	Opponent(s)	Votes	Pct	Ballots cast	Majority	Turnout
2018	N11 Gunong Semanggol	Razman Zakaria (PAS)	7,444	45.10%	Zaini Cha (UMNO)	5,541	33.57%	16,505	1,903	80.47%
2018	N11 Gunong Semanggol	Razman Zakaria (PAS)	7,444	45.10%	Ismail Ali (BERSATU)	3,520	21.33%	16,505	1,903	80.47%
2022	N11 Gunong Semanggol	Razman Zakaria (PAS)	12,825	59.29%	Nazirul Jamaluddin (UMNO)	5,359	24.77%	21,631	7,466	78.96%
2022	N11 Gunong Semanggol	Razman Zakaria (PAS)	12,825	59.29%	Sheikh Khuzaifah (AMANAH)	3,447	15.94%	21,631	7,466	78.96%
