= Wan Hashim Wan Teh =

Malaysian politician

Yang Berbahagia Dato' Wan Hashim Wan Teh DPMP JSM JP
- وان هاشم وان تيه

Member of the Malaysian Parliament for Gerik
- In office 21 March 2004 – 8 March 2008
- Preceded by: Khamsiyah Yeop (BN–UMNO)
- Succeeded by: Tan Lian Hoe (BN–Gerakan)
- Majority: 8,397 (2004)

Personal details
- Born: Wan Hashim bin Wan Teh
- Citizenship: Malaysian
- Party: UMNO
- Other political affiliations: Barisan Nasional
- Relations: Wan Zahidi Wan Teh (brother); Wan Abdul Hamid Wan Teh (brother); Wan Mohamed Wan Teh (brother)
- Parent(s): Wan Teh (father); Kalsom (mother)
- Occupation: Politician

Wan Hashim bin Wan Teh is a Malaysian politician from UMNO. He was the Member of Parliament for Gerik from 2004 to 2008.

== Early career ==
He was former lecturer of UKM before he became a politician. He is now the dean of Faculty of Defence Management Studies of National Defence University of Malaysia.

== Political career ==
In 2004, he was nominated to compete 2004 Malaysian general election for Gerik and won the seat against the PAS candidate, Ramli Tusin.

== Election results ==
Parliament of Malaysia
Year	Constituency	Candidate	Votes	Pct	Opponent(s)	Votes	Pct	Ballot cast	Majority	Turnout
2004	P054 Gerik	Wan Hashim Wan Teh (UMNO)	12,621	74.92%	Ramli Tusin (PAS)	4,224	25.08%	18,702	8,397	75.88%

== Honours ==
- Malaysia
  - Companion of the Order of Loyalty to the Crown of Malaysia (JSM) (1999)
- Perak
  - Knight Commander of the Order of the Perak State Crown (DPMP) – Dato' (1991)
  - Justice of the Peace of Perak (JP) (2009)
