= Fathul Huzir Ayob =

Malaysian politician

Yang Berhormat Tuan Fathul Huzir Ayob MP

Member of the Malaysian Parliament for Gerik
- Incumbent
- Assumed office 19 November 2022
- Preceded by: Hasbullah Osman (BN–UMNO)
- Majority: 1,377 (2022)

Personal details
- Born: Fathul Huzir bin Ayob Gerik, Perak, Malaysia
- Party: Malaysian United Indigenous Party (BERSATU) (–2026); Parti Wawasan Negara (WAWASAN) (2026–present)
- Other political affiliations: Perikatan Nasional (PN)

Fathul Huzir bin Ayob is a Malaysian politician who has served as the Member of Parliament (MP) for Gerik since November 2022. He was a member of Malaysian United Indigenous Party (BERSATU), a component party of the Perikatan Nasional (PN) coalition. He was Division Secretary of BERSATU of Gerik prior to his resignation in October 2023.

== Health ==
=== Speech difficulties ===
On 20 February 2023, Fathul Huzir suffered some speech difficulties during his parliamentary debates. He started his speech in a normal manner but was seen physically uncomfortable about five minutes into his speech, fidgeting his necktie and loosening it, covering his mouth with his right hand as well as slurring some of his words while carrying on his speech. Deputy Speaker of the Dewan Rakyat Ramli Mohd Nor then intervened asking him whether he could continue. Several MPs present in the Dewan Rakyat chamber like Bayan Baru MP Sim Tze Tzin, Kota Melaka MP Khoo Poay Tiong and Puncak Borneo MP Willie Mongin reacted worryingly to the situation and asked if he was alright and for space as well as medical assistance for him. Ramli then called the Sergeant-at-Arms to assist Fathul to the doctor. He was then pushed in a wheelchair heading towards Parliament clinic and was accompanied by Deputy Prime Minister Fadillah Yusof.

== Election results ==
Parliament of Malaysia
Year	Constituency	Candidate	Votes	Pct	Opponent(s)	Votes	Pct	Ballots cast	Majority	Turnout
2022	P054 Gerik	Fathul Huzir Ayob (BERSATU)	15,105	43.64%	Asyraf Wajdi Dusuki (UMNO)	13,728	39.66%	35,282	1,377	74.15%
2022	P054 Gerik	Fathul Huzir Ayob (BERSATU)	15,105	43.64%	Ahmad Tarmizi Mohd Jam (DAP)	5,779	16.70%	35,282	1,377	74.15%

== Honours ==
=== Honours of Malaysia ===
- Malaysia
  - Recipient of the 17th Yang di-Pertuan Agong Installation Medal (2024)

== See also ==
- Gerik (federal constituency)
