= Hasbullah Osman =

Malaysian politician (1957–2020)

Yang Berbahagia Dato' Hasbullah Osman DPMP AMP JP
- حسب الله عثمان

Chairman of the Syarikat Perumahan Negara Berhad
- In office 11 May 2020 – 16 November 2020
- Minister: Zuraida Kamaruddin
- Chief Executive Officer: Mastura Azlina Mohammad (Acting)
- Preceded by: Mohammad Mentek
- Succeeded by: Haniza Mohamed Talha

Member of the Malaysian Parliament for Gerik
- In office 5 May 2013 – 16 November 2020
- Preceded by: Tan Lian Hoe (BN–Gerakan)
- Succeeded by: Fathul Huzir Ayob (PN–BERSATU)
- Majority: 6,216 (2013); 5,528 (2018)

Member of the Perak State Legislative Assembly for Temengor
- In office 21 March 2004 – 5 May 2013
- Preceded by: Mokhtarudin Mohd Kaya (BN–UMNO)
- Succeeded by: Salbiah Mohamed (BN–UMNO)
- Majority: 4,990 (2004); 4,617 (2008)

Personal details
- Born: Hasbullah bin Osman; 17 February 1957 Gerik, Perak, Federation of Malaya (now Malaysia)
- Died: 16 November 2020 (aged 63) Raub, Pahang, Malaysia
- Resting place: Kampung Padang Muslim Cemetery, Gerik, Perak
- Citizenship: Malaysian
- Party: United Malays National Organisation (UMNO)
- Other political affiliations: Barisan Nasional (BN)
- Spouse: Rosmawati Arifin Zaini Abu Bakar
- Children: 8
- Education: Maktab Perguruan Persekutuan, Gelugor, Penang
- Occupation: Teacher

Hasbullah bin Osman (17 February 1957 – 16 November 2020) was a Malaysian politician who served as Chairman of the Syarikat Perumahan Negara Berhad (SPNB) from May 2020, Member of Parliament (MP) for Gerik from May 2013 to his death in November 2020 and Member of the Perak State Legislative Assembly (MLA) for Temengor from March 2004 to May 2013. He was a member of the United Malays National Organisation, a component party of the Barisan Nasional (BN) coalition.

== Death ==
On 16 November 2020, Hasbullah died from a heart attack. He was 63 years old.

== Election results ==
Perak State Legislative Assembly
Year	Constituency	Candidate	Votes	Pct	Opponent(s)	Votes	Pct	Ballots cast	Majority	Turnout
2004	N02 Temengor	Hasbullah Osman (UMNO)	7,180	76.63%	Mohamad Aun Yob Abas (PKR)	2,190	23.37%	9,839	4,990	74.38%
2008	N02 Temengor	Hasbullah Osman (UMNO)	7,578	71.90%	Moon Akau (PKR)	2,961	28.10%	10,910	4,617	75.52%

Parliament of Malaysia
Year	Constituency	Candidate	Votes	Pct	Opponent(s)	Votes	Pct	Ballots cast	Majority	Turnout
2013	P054 Gerik	Hasbullah Osman (UMNO)	16,415	61.68%	Norhayati Kasim (PAS)	10,199	38.32%	27,414	6,216	83.77%
2018	P054 Gerik	Hasbullah Osman (UMNO)	13,243	48.49%	Mohd Dahalan Ismail (PAS)	7,715	28.25%	28,032	5,528	78.08%
2018	P054 Gerik	Hasbullah Osman (UMNO)	13,243	48.49%	Ibrahim Mohd Hanafiah (PPBM)	6,353	23.26%	28,032	5,528	78.08%

== Honours ==
- Perak
  - Knight Commander of the Order of the Perak State Crown (DPMP) – Dato' (2005)
  - Member of the Order of the Perak State Crown (AMP) (1991)
