= Gunong Semanggol =

Political subdivision in Malaysia

Gunong Semanggol (N11)
Perak constituency

State constituency
- Legislature: Perak State Legislative Assembly
MLA
Razman Zakaria
PN
- Constituency created: 1959
- First contested: 1959
- Last contested: 2022

Demographics
- Electors (2022): 27,396

Gunong Semanggol is a state constituency in Perak, Malaysia, that has been represented in the Perak State Legislative Assembly.

== Demographics ==
Ethnic breakdown of Gunong Semanggol's electorate as of 2022
1. Malay (86.6%)
2. Chinese (8.81%)
3. Indian (4.02%)
4. Other ethnicities (0.56%)

== History ==
=== Polling districts ===
According to the federal gazette issued on 31 October 2022, the Gunong Semanggol constituency is divided into 14 polling districts.

| State constituency | Polling Districts | Code | Location |
|---|---|---|---|
| Gunong Semanggol (N11） | Batu 6 Bukit Merah | 058/11/01 | SRA Rakyat Al-Ammar |
| Gunong Semanggol (N11） | Bukit Merah | 058/11/02 | SK Bukit Merah |
| Gunong Semanggol (N11） | Pondok Tanjong Barat | 058/11/03 | SK Pondok Tanjong |
| Gunong Semanggol (N11） | Kampong Selamat | 058/11/04 | SK Kampong Selamat |
| Gunong Semanggol (N11） | Gunong Semanggol | 058/11/05 | SK Gunong Semanggol |
| Gunong Semanggol (N11） | Kubu Gajah | 058/11/06 | SRA Rakyat Nurul Islamiah |
| Gunong Semanggol (N11） | Kampong Tua | 058/11/07 | SK Haji Dahalan |
| Gunong Semanggol (N11） | Padang Lalang | 058/11/08 | SK Tebuk Pancur |
| Gunong Semanggol (N11） | Railway Line | 058/11/09 | SJK (C) Alor Pongsu |
| Gunong Semanggol (N11） | Parit Haji Taib | 058/11/10 | SK Parit Haji Taib |
| Gunong Semanggol (N11） | Mesjid Tinggi | 058/11/11 | SRA Rakyat Al Akhlak Al Islamiah |
| Gunong Semanggol (N11） | Kota Bandung | 058/11/12 | SK Dato' Mas'ud |
| Gunong Semanggol (N11） | Bagan Serai | 058/11/13 | SMK Bagan Serai |
| Gunong Semanggol (N11） | Main Road Bagan Serai | 058/11/14 | SJK (C) Tong Wah |

=== Representation history ===
Members of the Legislative Assembly for Gunong Semanggol
| Assembly | No | Years | Name | Party |
Constituency created
| 1st | N08 | 1959-1964 | Baharuddin Abdul Latif | PMIP |
| 2nd | N08 | 1964-1969 | Ahmad Yusof | Alliance (UMNO) |
| | | 1969-1971 | Assembly dissolved | |
| 3rd | N08 | 1969-1971 | Ahmad Yusof | Alliance (UMNO) |
| 3rd | N08 | 1971-1974 | Ahmad Yusof | BN (UMNO) |
| 4th | N08 | 1974-1978 | Baharuddin Abdul Latif | BN (PAS) |
| 5th | N08 | 1978-1982 | Zainal Abidin Zin | BN (UMNO) |
| 6th | N08 | 1982-1986 | Shamsudin Man | BN (UMNO) |
| 7th | N08 | 1986-1990 | Shamsudin Man | BN (UMNO) |
| 8th | N08 | 1990-1995 | Shamsudin Man | BN (UMNO) |
| 9th | N09 | 1995-1999 | Saikidol Mohamad Noor | BN (UMNO) |
| 10th | N09 | 1999-2004 | Sabran Asmawi | PAS |
| 11th | N11 | 2004-2008 | Abd Muhaimin Rahman Nazri | BN (UMNO) |
| 12th | N11 | 2008-2013 | Ramli Tusin | PR (PAS) |
| 13th | N11 | 2013-2018 | Mohd Zawawi Abu Hassan | PR (PAS) |
| 14th | N11 | 2018-2020 | Razman Zakaria | PAS |
| 14th | N11 | 2020-2022 | Razman Zakaria | PN (PAS) |
| 15th | N11 | 2022–present | Razman Zakaria | PN (PAS) |

== Election results ==
Perak state election, 2022: Gunong Semanggol
| Party | Candidate | Votes | % | ∆% |
|---|---|---|---|---|
| PN | Razman Zakaria | 12,825 | 59.29 | ▲59.29 |
| BN | Nazirul Jamaluddin | 5,359 | 24.77 | ▼8.81 |
| PH | Sheikh Khuzaifah Sheikh Abu Bakar | 3,447 | 15.94 | ▲15.94 |
| Total valid votes | | 21,978 | 100.00 | |
| Total rejected ballots | | 315 | | |
| Unreturned ballots | | 32 | | |
| Turnout | | 22,325 | 80.22 | ▼1.82 |
| Registered electors | | 27,396 | | |
| Majority | | 7,466 | 34.52 | ▲23.60 |
| PN hold | | Swing | | |

Perak state election, 2018: Gunong Semanggol
| Party | Candidate | Votes | % | ∆% |
|---|---|---|---|---|
| PAS | Razman Zakaria | 7,444 | 45.10 | ▼9.26 |
| BN | Zaini Cha | 5,541 | 33.58 | ▼11.62 |
| PKR | Ismail Ali | 3,520 | 21.33 | ▲21.33 |
| Total valid votes | | 16,505 | 98.09 | |
| Total rejected ballots | | 258 | 1.53 | |
| Unreturned ballots | | 63 | 0.37 | |
| Turnout | | 16,826 | 82.04 | ▼3.36 |
| Registered electors | | 20,510 | | |
| Majority | | 1,903 | 10.92 | ▲1.76 |
| PAS hold | | Swing | | |
Source(s) "RESULTS OF CONTESTED ELECTION AND STATEMENTS OF THE POLL AFTER THE OFFICIAL ADDITION OF VOTES". Archived from the original on 2023-04-28.

Perak state election, 2013: Gunong Semanggol
| Party | Candidate | Votes | % | ∆% |
|---|---|---|---|---|
| PAS | Mohd Zawawi Abu Hassan | 8,354 | 54.36 | ▼4.38 |
| BN | Ustaz Hj. Zulkarnain Ismail | 6,949 | 45.20 | ▲3.94 |
| Independent | Halidi Wahab | 71 | 0.46 | ▲0.46 |
| Total valid votes | | 15,374 | 98.40 | |
| Total rejected ballots | | 224 | 1.43 | |
| Unreturned ballots | | 26 | 0.17 | |
| Turnout | | 15,624 | 85.40 | ▲6.48 |
| Registered electors | | 18,287 | | |
| Majority | | 1,405 | 9.16 | ▼8.32 |
| PAS hold | | Swing | | |
Source(s) "KEPUTUSAN PILIHAN RAYA UMUM DEWAN UNDANGAN NEGERI". Archived from the original on 2022-03-17.

Perak state election, 2008: Gunong Semanggol
| Party | Candidate | Votes | % | ∆% |
|---|---|---|---|---|
| PAS | Ramli Tusin | 6,959 | 58.74 | ▲9.14 |
| BN | Abd Muhaimin Rahman Nazri | 4,889 | 41.26 | ▼9.14 |
| Total valid votes | | 11,848 | 95.24 | |
| Total rejected ballots | | 285 | 2.29 | |
| Unreturned ballots | | 307 | 2.47 | |
| Turnout | | 12,440 | 78.92 | ▲4.00 |
| Registered electors | | 15,763 | | |
| Majority | | 2,070 | 17.48 | ▲16.68 |
| PAS gain from BN | | Swing | | ? |
Source(s) "KEPUTUSAN PILIHAN RAYA UMUM DEWAN UNDANGAN NEGERI PERAK BAGI TAHUN 2008".

Perak state election, 2004: Gunong Semanggol
| Party | Candidate | Votes | % | ∆% |
|---|---|---|---|---|
| BN | Abd Muhaimin Rahman Nazri | 5,930 | 50.40 | ▲2.70 |
| PAS | Sabran Asmawi | 5,836 | 49.60 | ▼2.70 |
| Total valid votes | | 11,766 | 97.88 | |
| Total rejected ballots | | 220 | 1.83 | |
| Unreturned ballots | | 35 | 0.29 | |
| Turnout | | 12,021 | 74.92 | ▲7.74 |
| Registered electors | | 16,045 | | |
| Majority | | 94 | 0.80 | ▼3.80 |
| BN gain from PAS | | Swing | | ? |
Source(s) "KEPUTUSAN PILIHAN RAYA UMUM DEWAN UNDANGAN NEGERI PERAK BAGI TAHUN 2004".

Perak state election, 1999: Gunong Semanggol
| Party | Candidate | Votes | % | ∆% |
|---|---|---|---|---|
| PAS | Sabran Asmawi | 8,448 | 52.30 | ▲13.08 |
| BN | Saikidol Mohammad Noor | 7,705 | 47.70 | ▼13.08 |
| Total valid votes | | 16,153 | 96.90 | |
| Total rejected ballots | | 475 | 2.85 | |
| Unreturned ballots | | 41 | 0.25 | |
| Turnout | | 16,669 | 67.18 | ▼1.64 |
| Registered electors | | 24,814 | | |
| Majority | | 743 | 4.60 | ▼16.96 |
| PAS gain from BN | | Swing | | ? |
Source(s) "KEPUTUSAN PILIHAN RAYA UMUM DEWAN UNDANGAN NEGERI PERAK BAGI TAHUN 1999".

Perak state election, 1995: Gunong Semanggol
| Party | Candidate | Votes | % | ∆% |
|---|---|---|---|---|
| BN | Saikidol Mohammad Noor | 9,249 | 60.78 | ▲5.88 |
| PAS | Abdul Halim Mohd. Ali | 5,968 | 39.22 | ▼5.88 |
| Total valid votes | | 15,217 | 95.96 | |
| Total rejected ballots | | 560 | 3.53 | |
| Unreturned ballots | | 81 | 0.51 | |
| Turnout | | 15,858 | 68.82 | ▼3.76 |
| Registered electors | | 23,044 | | |
| Majority | | 3,281 | 21.56 | ▲11.76 |
| BN hold | | Swing | | |
Source(s) "KEPUTUSAN PILIHAN RAYA UMUM DEWAN UNDANGAN NEGERI PERAK BAGI TAHUN 1999".

Perak state election, 1990: Gunong Semanggol
| Party | Candidate | Votes | % | ∆% |
|---|---|---|---|---|
| BN | Shamsudin Man | 8,077 | 54.90 | ▼4.02 |
| PAS | Abdul Halim Ali | 6,636 | 45.10 | ▲4.02 |
| Total valid votes | | 14,713 | 96.00 | |
| Total rejected ballots | | 613 | 4.00 | |
| Unreturned ballots | | 0 | 0 | |
| Turnout | | 15,326 | 72.58 | ▲2.87 |
| Registered electors | | 21,117 | | |
| Majority | | 1,441 | 9.80 | ▼8.04 |
| BN hold | | Swing | | |
Source(s) "KEPUTUSAN PILIHAN RAYA UMUM DEWAN UNDANGAN NEGERI PERAK BAGI TAHUN 1990".

Perak state election, 1986: Gunong Semanggol
| Party | Candidate | Votes | % | ∆% |
|---|---|---|---|---|
| BN | Shamsudin Man | 8,366 | 58.92 | ▲0.17 |
| PAS | Subki Latif | 5,781 | 41.08 | ▼0.17 |
| Total valid votes | | 14,147 | 100.00 | |
| Total rejected ballots | | 602 | | |
| Unreturned ballots | | 0 | | |
| Turnout | | 14,749 | 69.71 | ▼5.74 |
| Registered electors | | 21,157 | | |
| Majority | | 2,585 | 18.27 | ▲0.33 |
| BN hold | | Swing | | |
Source(s) "KEPUTUSAN PILIHAN RAYA UMUM DEWAN UNDANGAN NEGERI PERAK BAGI TAHUN 1986".

Perak state election, 1982: Gunong Semanggol
| Party | Candidate | Votes | % | ∆% |
|---|---|---|---|---|
| BN | Samsudin Man | 6,413 | 58.97 | ▲0.65 |
| PAS | Safian Md Nor | 4,462 | 41.03 | ▲0.77 |
| Total valid votes | | 10,875 | 100.00 | |
| Total rejected ballots | | 357 | | |
| Unreturned ballots | | 0 | | |
| Turnout | | 11,232 | 75.45 | ▼0.57 |
| Registered electors | | 14,887 | | |
| Majority | | 1,951 | 17.94 | ▼0.12 |
| BN hold | | Swing | | |

Perak state election, 1978: Gunong Semanggol
| Party | Candidate | Votes | % |
|---|---|---|---|
| BN | Zainal Abidin Zin | 5,939 | 58.32 |
| PAS | Baharuddin Abdul Latif | 4,100 | 40.26 |
| DAP | Idham Affandi Ahmad | 144 | 1.41 |
| Total valid votes | | 10,183 | 100.00 |
| Total rejected ballots | | 465 | |
| Unreturned ballots | | 0 | |
| Turnout | | 10,648 | 76.02 |
| Registered electors | | 14,007 | |
| Majority | | 1,839 | 18.06 |
| BN hold | | Swing | |

Perak state election, 1974: Gunong Semanggol
| Party | Candidate | Votes | % | ∆% |
|---|---|---|---|---|
On the nomination day, Baharuddin Abdul Latif won uncontested.
| BN | Baharuddin Abdul Latif | | | |
| Total valid votes | | | | |
| Total rejected ballots | | | | |
| Unreturned ballots | | | | |
| Turnout | | | | |
| Registered electors | | 13,120 | | |
| Majority | | | | |
| BN hold | | Swing | | - |

Perak state election, 1969: Gunong Semanggol
| Party | Candidate | Votes | % | ∆% |
|---|---|---|---|---|
| Alliance | Ahmad Yusof | 5,679 | 54.83 | ▼3.23 |
| PMIP | Baharuddin Abdul Latif | 4,679 | 45.17 | ▲5.58 |
| Total valid votes | | 10,358 | 100.00 | |
| Total rejected ballots | | 797 | | |
| Unreturned ballots | | 0 | | |
| Turnout | | 11,155 | 76.69 | ▼3.53 |
| Registered electors | | 14,546 | | |
| Majority | | 1,000 | 9.65 | ▼8.81 |
| Alliance hold | | Swing | | |

Perak state election, 1964: Gunong Semanggol
| Party | Candidate | Votes | % | ∆% |
|---|---|---|---|---|
| Alliance | Ahmad Yusof | 5,390 | 58.06 | ▲8.31 |
| PMIP | Baharuddin Abdul Latif | 3,676 | 39.60 | ▼10.66 |
| UDP | Maturidi Zakaria | 218 | 2.35 | ▲2.35 |
| Total valid votes | | 9,284 | 100.00 | |
| Total rejected ballots | | 327 | | |
| Unreturned ballots | | 0 | | |
| Turnout | | 9,611 | 80.22 | ▲15.56 |
| Registered electors | | 11,981 | | |
| Majority | | 1,714 | 18.46 | ▲17.96 |
| Alliance gain from PMIP | | Swing | | - |

Perak state election, 1959: Gunong Semanggol
| Party | Candidate | Votes | % |
|---|---|---|---|
| PMIP | Baharuddin Abdul Latif | 3,392 | 50.25 |
| Alliance | Ramli Omar | 3,358 | 49.75 |
| Total valid votes | | 6,750 | 100.00 |
| Total rejected ballots | | 221 | |
| Unreturned ballots | | 0 | |
| Turnout | | 6,971 | 64.66 |
| Registered electors | | 10,781 | |
| Majority | | 34 | 0.50 |
This was a new constituency created.
