= Baharuddin Abdul Latif =

Malaysian politician

Ustaz Haji Baharuddin Abdul Latif
- بحرالدين عبداللطيف

Member of the Perak State Legislative Assembly for Gunong Semanggol
- In office 1959–1964
- Succeeded by: Ahmad Yusof (UMNO)

Personal details
- Born: 1927 Gunong Semanggol, Perak
- Died: 11 December 2001 (aged 73–74) Hospital Tawakkal, Kuala Lumpur
- Party: PAS
- Spouse: Fatimah Hassan
- Relations: Subky Abdul Latif (brother)
- Occupation: Politician

Baharuddin bin Abdul Latif was a Malaysian politician from PAS. He was the Member of Perak State Legislative Assembly for Gunong Semanggol from 1959 to 1964 and from 1974 to 1978. He was one of the founders and was the General-Secretary of PAS.

== Family ==
Baharuddin was the brother of Subky Abdul Latif. He was married to Ustazah Fatimah Hassan and had 12 children.

== Activist ==
Before establishing PAS, Baharuddin was active in Angkatan Pemuda Insaf (API) together with Pak Sako, Burhanuddin Helmi dan Aishah Ghani.

== Death ==
Baharuddin died at the age of 74 on 11 December 2001 in Hospital Tawakkal due to shingles.

== Books ==
- Baharuddin b. Hj. Abd. Latif (1994). Rencana-rencana sekitar perjuangan PAS, 1951-1987: Islam memanggil. Gunung Semanggol: Pustaka Abrar. ISBN 9839999907.
