= Ramli Tusin =

Malaysian politician

Member of the Perak State Legislative Assembly for Gunong Semanggol
- In office 2008–2013
- Preceded by: Abd Muhaimin Abd Rahman Nazri
- Succeeded by: Mohd Zawawi Abu Hassan

Personal details
- Party: PAS

Ramli bin Tusin is a Malaysian politician from PAS. He was the Member of Perak State Legislative Assembly for Gunung Semanggol from 2008 to 2013. In 2004 Malaysian general election, he contested for the Gerik parliamentary seat but lost to the BN candidate, Datuk Dr Wan Hashim Wan Teh.

== Election results ==
Parliament of Malaysia
| Year | Constituency | Candidate | Votes | Pct | Opponent(s) | Votes | Pct | Ballots cast | Majority | Turnout |
|---|---|---|---|---|---|---|---|---|---|---|
| 2004 | P054 Gerik | Ramli Tusin (PAS) | 4,224 | 25.08% | Wan Hashim Wan Teh (UMNO) | 12,621 | 74.92% | 8,397 | 18,702 | 75.88% |

Perak State Legislative Assembly
| Year | Constituency | Candidate | Votes | Pct | Opponent(s) | Votes | Pct | Ballots cast | Majority | Turnout |
|---|---|---|---|---|---|---|---|---|---|---|
| 2008 | N11 Gunong Semanggol | Ramli Tusin (PAS) | 6,959 | 55.94% | Abdul Muhaimin Abdul Rahman Nazri (UMNO) | 4,889 | 39.30% | 12,440 | 2,070 | 78.92% |
