= Gerik (federal constituency) =

Federal constituency in Perak, Malaysia

Gerik (P054)
Perak constituency

Federal constituency
- Legislature: Dewan Rakyat
- MP: Fathul Huzir Ayob; PN
- Constituency created: 1974
- First contested: 1974
- Last contested: 2022

Demographics
- Population (2020): 56,810
- Electors (2022): 47,565
- Area (km²): 4,521
- Pop. density (per km²): 12.6

Gerik is a federal constituency in Hulu Perak District, Perak, Malaysia, that has been represented in the Dewan Rakyat since 1974.

The federal constituency was created in the 1974 redistribution and is mandated to return a single member to the Dewan Rakyat under the first past the post voting system.

== Demographics ==
Ethnic breakdown of Gerik's electorate as of 2022
1. Malay (72.0%)
2. Chinese (13.6%)
3. Other ethnicities (9.60%)
4. Indian (4.80%)

As of 2020, Gerik has a population of 56,810 people.

Age breakdown of Gerik's electorate as of 2022
1. 18-20 (6.95%)
2. 21-29 (24.8%)
3. 30-39 (24.7%)
4. 40-49 (16.1%)
5. 50-59 (12.3%)
6. 60-69 (9.40%)
7. 70-79 (4.02%)
8. 80-89 (1.44%)
9. above 90 (0.28%)
Gender breakdown of Gerik's electorate as of 2022
1. Male (52.5%)
2. Female (47.5%)

== History ==
=== Polling districts ===
According to the federal gazette issued on 31 October 2022, the Gerik constituency is divided into 22 polling districts.

State constituency	Polling districts	Code	Location
Pengkalan Hulu (N01)	Kuak Hulu	054/01/01	SK Kuak Hulu
Pengkalan Hulu (N01)	Ayer Panas	054/01/02	SK Ayer Panas; SK (FELDA) Lepang Nenering
Pengkalan Hulu (N01)	Kuak Luar	054/01/03	SK Kuak Luar
Pengkalan Hulu (N01)	Pekan Kroh	054/01/04	SK Keroh
Pengkalan Hulu (N01)	Kampong Selarong	054/01/05	SK Bekuai
Pengkalan Hulu (N01)	Tasek	054/01/06	SK Tasek
Pengkalan Hulu (N01)	Klian Intan	054/01/07	SK Klian Intan
Pengkalan Hulu (N01)	Kampong Pahit	054/02/08	SK Pahit
Pengkalan Hulu (N01)	Kampong Lalang	054/01/09	SK Kampong Lalang
Pengkalan Hulu (N01)	Kampong Plang	054/01/10	SK Plang
Temengor (N02)	Krunei	054/02/01	SK Kerunai
Temengor (N02)	Pekan Grik Barat	054/02/02	SK Sri Adika Raja
Temengor (N02)	Batu Dua	054/02/03	SJK (C) Kg. Bahru Batu Dua
Temengor (N02)	Pekan Grik Timor	054/02/04	SJK (C) Chung Wa
Temengor (N02)	Grik Utara	054/02/05	SK Batu 4
Temengor (N02)	Kuala Rui	054/02/06	SJK (C) Kuala Rui
Temengor (N02)	Bersia	054/02/07	SK Basia Lama
Temengor (N02)	Rancangan FELDA Bersia	054/02/08	SK RKT Bersia
Temengor (N02)	Kampong Bongor	054/02/09	SK Bongor
Temengor (N02)	Sungai Tiang	054/02/10	SK Sungai Tiang; Tabika KEMAS / JAKOA, Kg Sungai Kijar
Temengor (N02)	Banun	054/02/11	SK RPS Banun
Temengor (N02)	Pos Kemar	054/02/12	SK RPS Pos Kemar

=== Representation history ===
Members of Parliament for Gerik
Parliament	No	Years	Member	Party	Vote Share
Constituency created, renamed from Ulu Perak
4th	P044	1974–1978	Shamsuddin Din (شمس الدين دين)	BN (UMNO)	Uncontested
5th	P044	1978–1982	Tajol Rosli Mohd Ghazali (تاج الرسلي محمد غزالي)	BN (UMNO)	9,441; 58.94%
6th	P044	1982–1986	Tajol Rosli Mohd Ghazali (تاج الرسلي محمد غزالي)	BN (UMNO)	13,355; 71.97%
7th	P049	1986–1990	Tajol Rosli Mohd Ghazali (تاج الرسلي محمد غزالي)	BN (UMNO)	12,039; 62.41%
8th	P049	1990–1995	Tajol Rosli Mohd Ghazali (تاج الرسلي محمد غزالي)	BN (UMNO)	15,578; 64.52%
9th	P052	1995–1999	Tajol Rosli Mohd Ghazali (تاج الرسلي محمد غزالي)	BN (UMNO)	17,170; 71.90%
10th	P052	1999–2004	Khamsiyah Yeop (خمسية يوڤ)	BN (UMNO)	15,297; 62.64%
11th	P054	2004–2008	Wan Hashim Wan Teh (وان هاشم وان تيه)	BN (UMNO)	12,621; 74.92%
12th	P054	2008–2013	Tan Lian Hoe (陈莲花)	BN (GERAKAN)	12,526; 64.31%
13th	P054	2013–2018	Hasbullah Osman (حسب الله عثمان)	BN (UMNO)	16,415; 61.68%
14th	P054	2018–2020	Hasbullah Osman (حسب الله عثمان)	BN (UMNO)	13,423; 48.49%
14th	P054	2020–2022	Vacant (Note: Vacant from 16 November 2020 until the 2022 Malaysian general election due to the incumbent died in office. No by-election was held due to 2021 Malaysian Proclamation of Emergency in order to curb the COVID-19 pandemic.)		
15th	P054	2022–2026	Fathul Huzir Ayob (فتح الحزير أيوب)	PN (BERSATU)	15,105; 43.64%
15th	P054	2026	Fathul Huzir Ayob (فتح الحزير أيوب)	Independent	15,105; 43.64%
15th	P054	2026–present	Fathul Huzir Ayob (فتح الحزير أيوب)	PN (WAWASAN)	15,105; 43.64%

=== State constituency ===
Parliamentary constituency	State constituency						
Parliamentary constituency	1955–1959*	1959–1974	1974–1986	1986–1995	1995–2004	2004–2018	2018–present
Gerik			Kenering				
Gerik					Pengkalan Hulu		
Gerik			Temengor				

=== Historical boundaries ===
State Constituency	Area				
State Constituency	1974	1984	1994	2003	2018
Kenering	Belum; Gerik; Kenering; Lawin; Pos Piah		Belum; Kenering; Lawin; Pos Piah; Pos Poi		
Pengkalan Hulu			Kampung Kerunai; Kroh; Kuak; Pengkalan Hulu; Tasek	Klian Intan; Kroh; Kuak; Pengkalan Hulu; Tasek	
Temengor	FELDA Bersia; Kroh; Krunei; Pengkalan Hulu; Pos Kemar		FELDA Bersia; Gerik; Krunei; Pos Kemar; Temengor	FELDA Bersia; Gerik; Kampung Kerunai; Krunei; Pos Kemar	

=== Current state assembly members ===
No.	State Constituency	Member	Coalition (Party)
N01	Pengkalan Hulu	Mohamad Amin Roslan	PN (PAS)
N02	Temengor	Salbiah Mohamed	BN (UMNO)

=== Local governments & postcodes ===
No.	State Constituency	Local Government	Postcode
N01	Pengkalan Hulu	Pengkalan Hulu District Council; Gerik District Council (Kampung Plang area)	33100 Pengkalan Hulu; 33200 Intan; 33300, 33310, 33320 Gerik
N02	Temengor	Gerik District Council	33100 Pengkalan Hulu; 33200 Intan; 33300, 33310, 33320 Gerik

== Election results ==
Malaysian general election, 2022
Party	Candidate	Votes	%	∆%
PN	Fathul Huzir Ayob	15,105	43.64	▲43.64
BN	Asyraf Wajdi Dusuki	13,728	39.66	▼16.40
PH	Ahmad Tarmizi Mohd Jam	5,779	16.70	▲16.70
Total valid votes		34,612	100.00	
Total rejected ballots		670		
Unreturned ballots		78		
Turnout		35,360	72.77	▼5.31
Registered electors		47,565		
Majority		1,377	3.98	▼16.26
PN gain from BN		Swing		?
Source(s) https://lom.agc.gov.my/ilims/upload/portal/akta/outputp/1753277/PUB610%20PARLIMEN%20PERAK.pdf

Malaysian general election, 2018
Party	Candidate	Votes	%	∆%
BN	Hasbullah Osman	13,243	48.49	▼13.19
PAS	Mohd Dahalan Ismail	7,715	28.25	▼10.17
PKR	Ibrahim Mohd Hanafiah	6,353	23.26	▲23.36
Total valid votes		27,311	100.00	
Total rejected ballots		595		
Unreturned ballots		126		
Turnout		28,032	78.08	▼5.69
Registered electors		35,903		
Majority		5,528	20.24	▼3.12
BN hold		Swing		
Source(s) "His Majesty's Government Gazette - Notice of Contested Election, Parliament for the State of Perak [P.U. (B) 237/2018]" (PDF). Attorney General's Chambers of Malaysia. 3 May 2018. "Federal Government Gazette - Results of Contested Election and Statements of the Poll after the Official Addition of Votes, Parliamentary Constituencies for the State of Perak [P.U. (B) 311/2018]" (PDF). Attorney General's Chambers of Malaysia. 28 May 2018.

Malaysian general election, 2013
Party	Candidate	Votes	%	∆%
BN	Hasbullah Osman	16,415	61.68	▼2.63
PAS	Norhayati Kasim	10,199	38.32	▲2.63
Total valid votes		26,614	100.00	
Total rejected ballots		494		
Unreturned ballots		306		
Turnout		27,414	83.77	▲5.64
Registered electors		32,725		
Majority		6,216	23.36	▼5.26
BN hold		Swing		
Source(s) "Federal Government Gazette - Notice of Contested Election, Parliament for the State of Perak [P.U. (B) 174/2013]" (PDF). Attorney General's Chambers of Malaysia. 26 April 2013. Archived from the original (PDF) on 2019-12-29. "Federal Government Gazette - Results of Contested Election and Statements of the Poll after the Official Addition of Votes, Parliamentary Constituencies for the State of Perak [P.U. (B) 215/2013]" (PDF). Attorney General's Chambers of Malaysia. 22 May 2013.

Malaysian general election, 2008
Party	Candidate	Votes	%	∆%
BN	Tan Lian Hoe	12,526	64.31	▼10.61
PAS	Mohd Noor Abdul Rahman	6,953	35.69	▲10.61
Total valid votes		19,479	100.00	
Total rejected ballots		649		
Unreturned ballots		365		
Turnout		20,493	78.13	▲2.25
Registered electors		26,229		
Majority		5,573	28.62	▼21.22
BN hold		Swing		

Malaysian general election, 2004
Party	Candidate	Votes	%	∆%
BN	Wan Hashim Wan Teh	12,621	74.92	▲12.68
PAS	Ramli Tusin	4,224	25.08	▼12.68
Total valid votes		16,845	100.00	
Total rejected ballots		759		
Unreturned ballots		1,098		
Turnout		18,702	75.88	▲8.16
Registered electors		24,646		
Majority		8,397	49.84	▲24.56
BN hold		Swing		

Malaysian general election, 1999
Party	Candidate	Votes	%	∆%
BN	Khamsiyah Yeop	15,297	62.64	▼9.26
PAS	Zulkapely @ Zulkifly Abu	9,122	37.36	▲37.36
Total valid votes		24,419	100.00	
Total rejected ballots		503		
Unreturned ballots		1,245		
Turnout		26,167	67.72	▼2.22
Registered electors		38,639		
Majority		6,175	25.28	▼18.52
BN hold		Swing		

Malaysian general election, 1995
Party	Candidate	Votes	%	∆%
BN	Mohamed Tajol Rosli Mohd Ghazali	17,170	71.90	▲7.38
S46	Roslan Mohd Latif	6,712	28.10	▼7.38
Total valid votes		23,882	100.00	
Total rejected ballots		1,009		
Unreturned ballots		764		
Turnout		25,655	69.94	▼2.39
Registered electors		36,681		
Majority		10,458	43.80	▲14.76
BN hold		Swing		

Malaysian general election, 1990
Party	Candidate	Votes	%	∆%
BN	Mohamed Tajol Rosli Mohd Ghazali	15,578	64.52	▲2.11
S46	Roslan Mohd Latif	8,565	35.48	▲35.48
Total valid votes		24,143	100.00	
Total rejected ballots		814		
Unreturned ballots		0		
Turnout		24,957	72.33	▲2.90
Registered electors		34,506		
Majority		7,013	29.04	▼12.35
BN hold		Swing		

Malaysian general election, 1986
Party	Candidate	Votes	%	∆%
BN	Mohamed Tajol Rosli Mohd Ghazali	12,039	62.41	▼9.56
PAS	Mohd Rus Jaafar	4,054	21.02	▼7.01
DAP	Choo Sing Chye	3,197	16.57	▲16.57
Total valid votes		19,290	100.00	
Total rejected ballots		630		
Unreturned ballots		0		
Turnout		19,920	69.43	▼6.22
Registered electors		28,691		
Majority		7,985	41.39	▼2.55
BN hold		Swing		

Malaysian general election, 1982
Party	Candidate	Votes	%	∆%
BN	Mohamed Tajol Rosli Mohd Ghazali	13,355	71.97	▲13.03
PAS	Ibrahim Ariffin	5,202	28.03	▲5.56
Total valid votes		18,557	100.00	
Total rejected ballots		741		
Unreturned ballots		0		
Turnout		19,298	75.65	▲2.43
Registered electors		25,509		
Majority		8,153	43.94	▲7.47
BN hold		Swing		

Malaysian general election, 1978
Party	Candidate	Votes	%	∆%
BN	Mohamed Tajol Rosli Mohd Ghazali	9,441	58.94	▲58.94
PAS	Mohamad Junid	3,599	22.47	▲22.47
DAP	Fong Cheng Wee	2,977	18.59	▲18.59
Total valid votes		16,017	100.00	
Total rejected ballots		379		
Unreturned ballots		0		
Turnout		16,396	78.11	
Registered electors		20,991		
Majority		5,842	36.47	
BN hold		Swing		

Malaysian general election, 1974
Party	Candidate	Votes	%	∆%
On the nomination day, Shamsuddin Din won uncontested.
BN	Shamsuddin Din			
Total valid votes			100.00	
Total rejected ballots				
Unreturned ballots				
Turnout				
Registered electors		16,407		
Majority				
This was a new constituency created.
