= Tan Lian Hoe =

Malaysian politician (born 1958)

Yang Berbahagia Dato' Tan Lian Hoe DPMP
- 陈莲花

Deputy Minister of Domestic Trade, Co-operatives and Consumerism
- In office 10 April 2009 – 15 May 2013 Serving with Rohani Abdul Karim (2010–2013)
- Monarchs: Mizan Zainal Abidin; Abdul Halim
- Prime Minister: Abdullah Ahmad Badawi; Najib Razak
- Minister: Ismail Sabri Yaakob
- Preceded by: Jelaing Mersat (Domestic Trade, Consumerism); Saifuddin Abdullah (Co-operatives)
- Succeeded by: Ahmad Bashah Md Hanipah
- Constituency: Gerik

Deputy Minister of Information
- In office 19 March 2008 – 8 April 2009
- Monarch: Mizan Zainal Abidin
- Prime Minister: Abdullah Ahmad Badawi
- Minister: Ahmad Shabery Cheek
- Preceded by: Ahmad Zahid Hamidi; Chia Kwang Chye
- Succeeded by: Heng Seai Kie as Deputy Minister of Information, Communications and Culture I Joseph Salang Gandum as Deputy Minister of Information, Communications and Culture II
- Constituency: Gerik

Member of the Malaysian Parliament for Gerik
- In office 8 March 2008 – 5 May 2013
- Preceded by: Wan Hashim Wan Teh (BN–UMNO)
- Succeeded by: Hasbullah Osman (BN–UMNO)
- Majority: 5,573 (2008)

Member of the Malaysian Parliament for Bukit Gantang
- In office 21 March 2004 – 8 March 2008
- Preceded by: Abdullah Fadzil Che Wan (BN–UMNO)
- Succeeded by: Roslan Shaharum (PAS)
- Majority: 8,888 (2004)

Personal details
- Born: 14 November 1958 (age 67) Malacca, Federation of Malaya (now Malaysia)
- Party: Parti Gerakan Rakyat Malaysia (Gerakan)
- Other political affiliations: Barisan Nasional (BN)
- Occupation: Politician

Tan Lian Hoe (simplified Chinese: 陈莲花; traditional Chinese: 陳蓮花; pinyin: Chén Liánhuā; born 14 November 1958) is a Malaysian politician. She was a Member of Parliament of Malaysia from 2004 to 2013. She was a member of the Malaysian People's Movement Party (Gerakan), a former component party in the then-ruling Barisan Nasional (BN) coalition (nowadays it is a component party of the Perikatan Nasional coalition since 2020).

== Political career ==
Tan was elected to the Gerik seat in the 2008 election, having served from 2004 as the Member of Parliament for Bukit Gantang earlier.

In the 2013 election, she contested the seat of Taiping, but was defeated by Nga Kor Ming of the Democratic Action Party (DAP).

Tan contested the Perak state seat of Jalong instead in the 2018 general elections but lost.

== Controversy ==
In October 2008, Tan was rebuked by the then Prime Minister Abdullah Ahmad Badawi for having criticized the United Malays National Organisation (UMNO), the leading party in the Barisan Nasional government, for what she saw as race-based politics.

== Election results ==
Parliament of Malaysia
Year	Constituency	Candidate	Votes	Pct	Opponent(s)	Votes	Pct	Ballots cast	Majority	Turnout
2004	P059 Bukit Gantang	Tan Lian Hoe (Gerakan)	23,294	61.79%	Lo' Lo' Mohamad Ghazali (PAS)	14,406	38.21%	38,642	8,888	71.72%
2008	P054 Gerik	Tan Lian Hoe (Gerakan)	12,526	64.31%	Mohd Noor Abdul Rahman (PAS)	6,953	35.69%	20,493	5,573	78.13%
2013	P060 Taiping	Tan Lian Hoe (Gerakan)	25,530	39.94%	Nga Kor Ming (DAP)	37,275	58.32%	63,913	11,745	81.80%

Perak State Legislative Assembly
Year	Constituency	Candidate	Votes	Pct	Opponent(s)	Votes	Pct	Ballots cast	Majority	Turnout
2018	N22 Jalong	Tan Lian Hoe (Gerakan)	6,536	22.10%	Loh Sze Yee (DAP)	16,138	54.50%	23,137	9,602	78.10%

== Honours ==
- Perak
  - Knight Commander of the Order of the Perak State Crown (DPMP) – Dato' (2006)
