= Khamsiyah Yeop =

Malaysian politician

Yang Berbahagia Dato' Khamsiyah Yeop DPMP PMP AMP
- خامسية يوڤ

Ministerial roles
- 1999–2004: Parliamentary Secretary in the Prime Minister's Department
- 2004–2008: Deputy Minister of Entrepreneur and Co-operatives Development

Faction represented in Dewan Rakyat
- 1999–2008: Barisan Nasional

Faction represented in Perak State Legislative Assembly
- 1995–1999: Barisan Nasional

Personal details
- Born: Khamsiyah binti Yeop; 28 April 1944 (age 81) Lenggong, Perak, Japanese occupation of Malaya
- Citizenship: Malaysian
- Party: United Malays National Organisation (UMNO)
- Other political affiliations: Barisan Nasional (BN)
- Spouse: Mohamad Hashim
- Education: Penang Free School
- Occupation: Politician
- Profession: Teacher

Khamsiyah binti Yeop is a Malaysian politician and former Deputy Minister of Entrepreneur and Co-operatives Development.

== Election results ==
Perak State Legislative Assembly
Year	Constituency	Candidate	Votes	Pct	Opponent(s)	Votes	Pct	Ballots cast	Majority	Turnout
1995	N03 Kenering	Khamsiyah Yeop (UMNO)	5,051	67.08%	Abdul Rani Che Lah (S46)	2,308	30.65%	7,740	2,743	68.34%
1995	N03 Kenering	Khamsiyah Yeop (UMNO)	5,051	67.08%	Sulaiman Jabar (IND)	171	2.27%	7,740	2,743	68.34%

Parliament of Malaysia
Year	Constituency	Candidate	Votes	Pct	Opponent(s)	Votes	Pct	Ballots cast	Majority	Turnout
1999	P052 Gerik	Khamsiyah Yeop (UMNO)	15,297	62.64%	Zulkapely @ Zulkifly Abu (PAS)	9,122	37.36%	26,167	6,175	67.72%
2004	P055 Lenggong	Khamsiyah Yeop (UMNO)	10,924	67.37%	Zulkapely @ Zulkifly Abu (PAS)	5,292	32.63%	16,531	5,632	71.38%

== Honours ==
- Perak
  - Knight Commander of the Order of the Perak State Crown (DPMP) – Dato' (2001)
  - Commander of the Order of the Perak State Crown (PMP) (1999)
  - Member of the Order of the Perak State Crown (AMP) (1996)
