= Elections in Putrajaya =

This article provides links to the Malaysian federal election results for the parliamentary constituency of Putrajaya since 2004.

== Federal level ==
=== Federal election results ===
- Results of the 2022 Malaysian general election by parliamentary constituency#Federal Territory of Putrajaya
- Results of the 2018 Malaysian general election by parliamentary constituency#Federal Territory of Putrajaya
- Results of the 2013 Malaysian general election by parliamentary constituency#Federal Territory of Putrajaya
- Results of the 2008 Malaysian general election by parliamentary constituency#Federal Territory of Putrajaya
- Results of the 2004 Malaysian general election by parliamentary constituency#Federal Territory of Putrajaya

=== Federal constituencies ===
- List of Malaysian electoral districts#Federal Territory of Putrajaya
- List of former Malaysian federal electoral districts#Federal Territories

=== Elected members of the Dewan Rakyat ===
- Members of the Dewan Rakyat, 15th Malaysian Parliament#Federal Territory of Putrajaya
- Members of the Dewan Rakyat, 14th Malaysian Parliament#Federal Territory of Putrajaya
- Members of the Dewan Rakyat, 13th Malaysian Parliament#Federal Territory of Putrajaya
- Members of the Dewan Rakyat, 12th Malaysian Parliament#Federal Territory of Putrajaya
- Members of the Dewan Rakyat, 11th Malaysian Parliament#Federal Territory of Putrajaya
