= Elections in Labuan =

Elections in Malaysian territory

This article provides links to election results in the Malaysian Federal Territory of Labuan since 2004, and to the names of Labuan representatives in the Dewan Rakyat since 1964. Before it became a Federal Territory in 1984, Labuan was part of the Hilir Padas constituency of Sabah (1974–1984), the Labuan-Beaufort constituency of Sabah (1967–1974), and the Labuan constituency of Sabah (prior to 1967).

== Federal level ==
=== Federal election results ===
- Results of the 2022 Malaysian general election by parliamentary constituency#Federal Territory of Labuan
- Results of the 2018 Malaysian general election by parliamentary constituency#Federal Territory of Labuan
- Results of the 2013 Malaysian general election by parliamentary constituency#Federal Territory of Labuan
- Results of the 2008 Malaysian general election by parliamentary constituency#Federal Territory of Labuan
- Results of the 2004 Malaysian general election by parliamentary constituency#Federal Territory of Labuan

=== Federal constituencies ===
- List of Malaysian electoral districts#Federal Territory of Labuan
- List of former Malaysian federal electoral districts#Federal Territories
- List of former Malaysian federal electoral districts#Sabah

=== Elected members of the Dewan Rakyat ===
- Members of the Dewan Rakyat, 15th Malaysian Parliament#Federal Territory of Labuan
- Members of the Dewan Rakyat, 14th Malaysian Parliament#Federal Territory of Labuan
- Members of the Dewan Rakyat, 13th Malaysian Parliament#Federal Territory of Labuan
- Members of the Dewan Rakyat, 12th Malaysian Parliament#Federal Territory of Labuan
- Members of the Dewan Rakyat, 11th Malaysian Parliament#Federal Territory of Labuan
- Members of the Dewan Rakyat, 10th Malaysian Parliament#Federal Territory of Labuan
- Members of the Dewan Rakyat, 9th Malaysian Parliament#Federal Territory of Labuan
- Members of the Dewan Rakyat, 8th Malaysian Parliament#Federal Territory of Labuan
- Members of the Dewan Rakyat, 7th Malaysian Parliament#Federal Territory of Labuan
- Members of the Dewan Rakyat, 6th Malaysian Parliament#Sabah
- Members of the Dewan Rakyat, 5th Malaysian Parliament#Sabah
- Members of the Dewan Rakyat, 4th Malaysian Parliament#Sabah
- Members of the Dewan Rakyat, 3rd Malaysian Parliament#Sabah

== State level ==
=== State constituencies ===
- List of former Malaysian state electoral districts#Sabah

=== Elected members of the Sabah State Legislative Assembly ===
- List of Malaysian State Assembly Representatives (1978–82)#Sabah
- List of Malaysian State Assembly Representatives (1974–78)#Sabah
- List of Malaysian State Assembly Representatives (1969–74)#Sabah
- List of Malaysian State Assembly Representatives (1964–69)#Sabah
