= Yusuf Abd Wahab =

Malaysian politician

Yang Berhormat Dato Yusuf Abd Wahab PSBS JBK MP
- يوسف عبدالوهاب

Chairman of the Construction Industry Development Board
- Incumbent
- Assumed office 1 May 2020
- Minister: Fadillah Yusof (2020–2022); Alexander Nanta Linggi (since 2022)
- Chief Executive Officer: Ahmad 'Asri Abdul Hamid (until 2023); Mohd Zaid Zakaria (2023–2024); Zainora Zainal (since 2024)
- Preceded by: Meor Abdul Aziz Osman

Member of the Malaysian Parliament for Tanjong Manis
- Incumbent
- Assumed office 9 May 2018
- Preceded by: Norah Abdul Rahman (BN–PBB)
- Majority: 8,674 (2018); 13,908 (2022)

Faction represented in Dewan Rakyat
- 2018: Parti Pesaka Bumiputera Bersatu
- 2018–: Gabungan Parti Sarawak

Personal details
- Born: Yusuf bin Abd Wahab; 10 December 1963 (age 62) Kampung Paloh, Tanjung Manis, Mukah, Sarawak, Malaysia
- Citizenship: Malaysia
- Party: Parti Pesaka Bumiputera Bersatu (PBB)
- Other political affiliations: Barisan Nasional (BN) (until 2018); Gabungan Parti Sarawak (GPS) (since 2018)
- Children: 4
- Education: University of Nebraska Omaha

Yusuf bin Abd Wahab (Jawi: يوسف بن عبدالوهاب; born 10 December 1963) is a Malaysian politician who has served as the Member of Parliament (MP) for Tanjong Manis since May 2018 and Chairman of the Construction Industry Development Board (CIDB) since May 2020. He is a member of the Parti Pesaka Bumiputera Bersatu (PBB), a component party of the Gabungan Parti Sarawak (GPS) and formerly Barisan Nasional (BN) coalitions. He also serves as Chairman of the Parliamentary Special Select Committee of Infrastructure Development, Transport and Communications.

== Election results ==
Parliament of Malaysia
Year	Constituency	Candidate	Votes	Pct	Opponent(s)	Votes	Pct	Ballots cast	Majority	Turnout
2018	P206 Tanjong Manis	Yusuf Abd Wahab (PBB)	11,402	80.69%	Mohamad Fadillah Sabali (AMANAH)	2,728	19.31%	14,425	8,674	65.87%
2022	P206 Tanjong Manis	Yusuf Abd Wahab (PBB)	16,474	86.52%	Zainab Suhaili (AMANAH)	2,566	13.48%	19,395	13,908	57.79%

== Honours ==
=== Honours of Malaysia ===
- Malaysia
  - Recipient of the 17th Yang di-Pertuan Agong Installation Medal (2025)
- Sarawak
  - Commander of the Most Exalted Order of the Star of Sarawak (PSBS) – Dato (2025)
  - Companion of the Order of the Star of Hornbill Sarawak (JBK) (2020)
