= Tanjong Manis =

Federal constituency of Sarawak, Malaysia

Tanjong Manis (P206)
Sarawak constituency

Federal constituency
- Legislature: Dewan Rakyat
- MP: Yusuf Abd Wahab; GPS
- Constituency created: 2005
- First contested: 2008
- Last contested: 2022

Demographics
- Population (2020): 32,768
- Electors (2022): 32,948
- Area (km²): 2,024
- Pop. density (per km²): 16.2

Tanjong Manis is a federal constituency in Mukah Division (Tanjung Manis District) and Sarikei Division (Sarikei District), Sarawak, Malaysia, that has been represented in the Dewan Rakyat since 2008.

The federal constituency was created in the 2005 redistribution and is mandated to return a single member to the Dewan Rakyat under the first past the post voting system.

== Demographics ==
Ethnic breakdown of Tanjong Manis's electorate as of 2022:
1. Sarawak Bumiputera (47.9%)
2. Malay-Muslim Bumiputera (45.9%)
3. Chinese (5.60%)
4. Other ethnicities (0.60%)

As of 2020, Tanjong Manis has a population of 32,768 people.

Age breakdown of Tanjong Manis's electorate as of 2022
1. 18-20 (6.88%)
2. 21-29 (22.4%)
3. 30-39 (21.4%)
4. 40-49 (17.3%)
5. 50-59 (15.5%)
6. 60-69 (10.2%)
7. 70-79 (4.55%)
8. 80-89 (1.24%)
9. above 90 (0.48%)
Gender breakdown of Tanjong Manis's electorate as of 2022
1. Male (49.9%)
2. Female (50.1%)

== History ==
=== Polling districts ===
According to the gazette issued on 31 October 2022, the Tanjong Manis constituency has a total of 14 polling districts.

State constituency	Polling Districts	Code	Location
Kuala Rajang（N41）	Selalang	206/41/01	SK Mandor Aris Kpg. Selalang
Kuala Rajang（N41）	Belawai	206/41/02	SK Stalun; SK Abang Gesa
Kuala Rajang（N41）	Rajang	206/41/03	SK Bayang; SK Abang Galau; SK Abang Buyuk Kpg. Jerijeh
Kuala Rajang（N41）	Sari	206/41/04	SK Jawa Kerubong Jln. Selalang; SK Adin Sare; SK Bukit Kinyau; SK Sentebu; SK St. Andrew Sare
Kuala Rajang（N41）	Seberang	206/41/05	SK Muara Payang Sarikei; SK Abang Haji Matahir Sarikei; SRA Kpg. Baru Seberang Sarikei
Kuala Rajang（N41）	Nanga Lepa	206/41/06	RH Gabriel Ng Lepa
Semop (N42)	Paloh	206/42/01	SK Kpg. Sebako; Surau Kpg. Sedi; SK O.K.M. Pakeri Paloh; Dewan Serbaguna, Berangan Paloh; Tadika KEMAS Kpg. Kedang
Semop (N42)	Mupong	206/42/02	SK Mupong; SK Mupong Ulin
Semop (N42)	Semop	206/42/03	SK Kpg. Serdeng; SK Telok Gelam; SK Kpg. Bekakong; SK Kpg. Semop
Semop (N42)	Saai	206/42/04	SK Kpg. Kuit; SK Mohamad Radeh Kpg. Saie
Semop (N42)	Tekajong	206/42/05	SK Penibong; SK Kpg. Betanak; SK Salah Kecil; SK Kpg. Penipah; SK Kpg. Tekajong
Semop (N42)	Bruit	206/42/06	SK Kpg. Bruit
Semop (N42)	Bunut	206/42/07	SK Selidap; SJK (C) Ming Shing Sg. Sian; SK Sg. Sian; SK Tanjong Bundong
Semop (N42)	Bintangor	206/42/08	SK Abang Amin Bintangor

=== Representation history ===
Members of Parliament for Tanjong Manis
Parliament	No	Years	Member	Party
Constituency created from Kuala Rajang and Sarikei
12th	P206	2008–2013	Norah Abdul Rahman (نورة عبدالرحمٰن)	BN (PBB)
13th	P206	2013–2018	Norah Abdul Rahman (نورة عبدالرحمٰن)	BN (PBB)
14th	P206	2018	Yusuf Abdul Wahab (يوسف عبدالوهاب)	BN (PBB)
14th	P206	2018–2022	Yusuf Abdul Wahab (يوسف عبدالوهاب)	GPS (PBB)
15th	P206	2022–present	Yusuf Abdul Wahab (يوسف عبدالوهاب)	GPS (PBB)

=== State constituency ===
Parliamentary constituency	State constituency					
Parliamentary constituency	1969–1978	1978–1990	1990–1999	1999–2008	2008–2016	2016−present
Tanjong Manis					Belawai	
Tanjong Manis						Kuala Rajang
Tanjong Manis					Semop	

=== Current state assembly members ===
No.	State Constituency	Member	Coalition (Party)
N41	Kuala Rajang	Len Talif Salleh	GPS (PBB)
N42	Semop	Abdullah Saidol	GPS (PBB)

=== Local governments & postcodes ===
No.	State Constituency	Local Government	Postcode
N41	Kuala Rajang	Sarikei District Council (Selalang area); Matu & Daro District Council	96150 Belawai; 96200 Daro; 96500 Bintangor
N42	Semop	Sarikei District Council (Bunut and Bintangor areas); Matu & Daro District Council	96150 Belawai; 96200 Daro; 96500 Bintangor

== Election results ==
Malaysian general election, 2022: Tanjong Manis
Party	Candidate	Votes	%	∆%
GPS	Yusuf Abdul Wahab	16,474	86.52	▲86.52
PH	Zainab Suhaili	2,566	13.48	▼5.83
Total valid votes		19,040	100.00	
Total rejected ballots		238		
Unreturned ballots		117		
Turnout		19,395	57.79	▼8.08
Registered electors		32,948		
Majority		13,908	73.04	▲11.65
GPS gain from BN		Swing		?
Source(s) https://lom.agc.gov.my/ilims/upload/portal/akta/outputp/1753265/PARLIMEN%20SARAWAK%20(PUB%20620).pdf

Malaysian general election, 2018: Tanjong Manis
Party	Candidate	Votes	%	∆%
BN	Yusuf Abdul Wahab	11,402	80.69	▼8.17
PH	Mohamad Fadillah Sabali	2,728	19.31	▲19.31
Total valid votes		14,130	100.00	
Total rejected ballots		214		
Unreturned ballots		81		
Turnout		14,425	65.87	▼9.07
Registered electors		21,899		
Majority		8,674	61.39	▼16.33
BN hold		Swing		
Source(s) "His Majesty's Government Gazette - Notice of Contested Election, Parliament for the State of Sarawak [P.U. (B) 247/2018]" (PDF). Attorney General's Chambers of Malaysia. 3 May 2018. "Federal Government Gazette - Results of Contested Election and Statements of the Poll after the Official Addition of Votes, Parliamentary Constituencies for the State of Sarawak [P.U. (B) 321/2018]" (PDF). Attorney General's Chambers of Malaysia. 28 May 2018. Archived from the original (PDF) on 2019-12-29.

Malaysian general election, 2013: Tanjong Manis
Party	Candidate	Votes	%	∆%
BN	Norah Abdul Rahman	12,535	88.86	▲88.86
PAS	Jurina Mut	1,571	11.14	▲11.14
Total valid votes		14,106	100.00	
Total rejected ballots		238		
Unreturned ballots		58		
Turnout		14,402	74.95	
Registered electors		19,215		
Majority		10,964	77.72	
BN hold		Swing		
Source(s) "Federal Government Gazette - Notice of Contested Election, Parliament for the State of Sarawak [P.U. (B) 184/2013]" (PDF). Attorney General's Chambers of Malaysia. 26 April 2013. "Federal Government Gazette - Results of Contested Election and Statements of the Poll after the Official Addition of Votes, Parliamentary Constituencies for the State of Sarawak [P.U. (B) 225/2013]" (PDF). Attorney General's Chambers of Malaysia. 22 May 2013. Archived from the original (PDF) on 2018-09-30.

Malaysian general election, 2008: Tanjong Manis
Party	Candidate	Votes	%
On the nomination day, Norah Abdul Rahman won uncontested.
BN	Norah Abdul Rahman		
Total valid votes			100.00
Total rejected ballots			
Unreturned ballots			
Turnout			
Registered electors			
Majority			
This was a new constituency created.
