= Members of the Dewan Rakyat, 12th Malaysian Parliament =

12th Parliament of Malaysia
←	11th Parliament	13th Parliament	→

Overview
- Legislative body: Parliament of Malaysia
- Jurisdiction: Malaysia
- Meeting place: Malaysian Houses of Parliament
- Term: 28 April 2008 – 3 April 2013
- Election: 2008 general election
- Government: Third Abdullah cabinet (until 3 April 2009); First Najib cabinet
- Website: www.parlimen.gov.my

Dewan Rakyat
- Members: 222
- Speaker: Pandikar Amin Mulia
- Deputy Speaker: Wan Junaidi Tuanku Jaafar; Ronald Kiandee
- Secretary: Roosme Hamzah
- Prime Minister: Abdullah Ahmad Badawi (until 3 April 2009); Najib Razak
- Leader of the Opposition: Wan Azizah Wan Ismail (until 28 August 2008); Anwar Ibrahim
- Party control: Barisan Nasional

Sovereign
- Yang di-Pertuan Agong: Tuanku Mizan Zainal Abidin (until 12 December 2011); Tuanku Abdul Halim Muadzam Shah

Sessions
- 1st: 28 April 2008 – 12 January 2009
- 2nd: 16 February 2009 – 17 December 2009
- 3rd: 15 March 2010 – 16 December 2010
- 4th: 7 March 2011 – 1 December 2011
- 5th: 12 March 2012 – 29 November 2012

This is a list of the members of the Dewan Rakyat (House of Representatives) of the 12th Parliament of Malaysia, elected in 2008.

== Composition ==
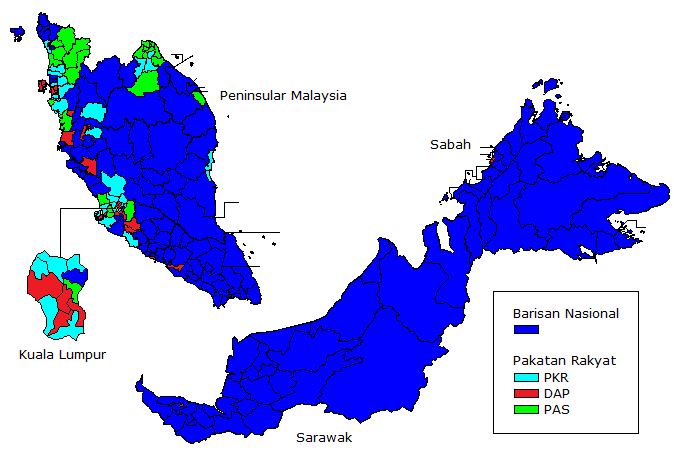
Members of Dewan Rakyat as elected in 2008 by federal constituency

Equal-area representation of members of Dewan Rakyat as elected in 2008 by federal constituency

Beginning of the 12th Parliament of Malaysia 28 April 2008
State and federal territories	# of seats	BN seats	PKR seats	DAP seats	PAS seats
Perlis	3	3	0	0	0
Kedah	15	4	5	0	6
Kelantan	14	2	3	0	9
Terengganu	8	7	0	0	1
Penang	13	2	4	7	0
Perak	24	13	3	6	2
Pahang	14	12	2	0	0
Selangor	22	5	9	4	4
Kuala Lumpur	11	1	4	5	1
Putrajaya	1	1	0	0	0
Negeri Sembilan	8	5	1	2	0
Malacca	6	5	0	1	0
Johor	26	25	0	1	0
Labuan	1	1	0	0	0
Sabah	25	24	0	1	0
Sarawak	31	30	0	1	0
Total	222	140	31	28	23

Beginning of the 12th Parliament of Malaysia 28 April 2008
State and federal territories	# of seats	BN seats	PR seats (informal)
Perlis	3	3	0
Kedah	15	4	11
Kelantan	14	5	9
Terengganu	8	7	1
Penang	13	2	11
Perak	24	13	11
Pahang	14	12	2
Selangor	22	5	17
Kuala Lumpur	11	1	10
Putrajaya	1	1	0
Negeri Sembilan	8	5	3
Malacca	6	5	1
Johor	26	25	1
Labuan	1	1	0
Sabah	25	24	1
Sarawak	31	30	1
Total	222	140	82

Equal-area representation of party changes in the Dewan Rakyat from 2008 to 2013

Dissolution of the 12th Parliament of Malaysia 3 April 2013
State and federal territories	# of seats	BN seats	DAP seats	PKR seats	PAS seats	SAPP seats	PSM seats	IND seats	VAC seats
Perlis	3	3	0	0	0	0	0	0	0
Kedah	15	4	0	3	6	0	0	2	0
Kelantan	14	2	0	3	8	0	0	1	0
Terengganu	8	6	0	0	2	0	0	0	0
Penang	13	2	7	2	0	0	0	2	0
Perak	24	13	6	1	2	0	1	1	0
Pahang	14	12	0	2	0	0	0	0	0
Selangor	22	6	4	8	4	0	0	0	0
Kuala Lumpur	11	1	5	3	0	0	0	1	1
Putrajaya	1	1	0	0	0	0	0	0	0
Negeri Sembilan	8	5	2	1	0	0	0	0	0
Malacca	6	5	1	0	0	0	0	0	0
Johor	26	25	1	0	0	0	0	0	0
Labuan	1	1	0	0	0	0	0	0	0
Sabah	25	20	1	0	0	2	0	2	0
Sarawak	31	29	2	0	0	0	0	0	0
Total	222	135	29	23	22	2	1	9	1

Dissolution of the 12th Parliament of Malaysia 3 April 2013
State and federal territories	# of seats	BN seats	PR seats (informal)	IND seats	Others seats
Perlis	3	3	0	0	0
Kedah	15	4	9	2	0
Kelantan	14	2	11	1	0
Terengganu	8	6	2	0	0
Penang	13	2	9	2	0
Perak	24	13	9	1	1 List: Parti Sosialis Malaysia (1)
Pahang	14	12	2	0	0
Selangor	22	6	16	0	0
Kuala Lumpur	11	1	8	1	1 List: Vacant seat (1)
Putrajaya	1	1	0	0	0
Negeri Sembilan	8	5	3	0	0
Malacca	6	5	1	0	0
Johor	26	25	1	0	0
Labuan	1	1	0	0	0
Sabah	25	20	1	2	2 List: Sabah Progressive Party (2)
Sarawak	31	29	2	0	0
Total	222	135	74	9	4

== Seating arrangement ==
This is the seating arrangement as of its last meeting on 29 November 2012. In addition, there were a seat that is labelled as VACANT, namely Titiwangsa. The seats vacancy is due to the death of the incumbent Member of Parliament (MP) for the constituency, which happened on 17 July 2011 respectively.

Vacant	P052 Bayan Baru	P018 Kulim–Bandar Baharu	P017 Padang Serai	P034 Setiu	P055 Lenggong	P206 Tanjong Manis	P147 Parit Sulong	P135 Alor Gajah	P033 Besut	P002 Kangar	P039 Dungun	P139 Jasin	P038 Hulu Terengganu	P197 Kota Samarahan	P208 Sarikei	P222 Lawas	P218 Sibuti	Vacant
Vacant	P047 Nibong Tebal	P058 Bagan Serai	P116 Wangsa Maju	P094 Hulu Selangor	P161 Pulai	P087 Kuala Krau	P155 Tenggara	P141 Sekijang	P144 Ledang	P086 Maran	P162 Gelang Patah	P151 Simpang Renggam	Vacant	P178 Sipitang	P202 Sri Aman	P069 Parit	P179 Ranau	P221 Limbang
	P170 Tuaran	P190 Tawau	P171 Sepanggar	P203 Lubok Antu	P211 Lanang	P213 Mukah	P100 Pandan	P125 Putrajaya	P180 Keningau	P160 Johor Bahru	P192 Mas Gading	P181 Tenom	P127 Jempol	P092 Sabak Bernam	P131 Rembau	P166 Labuan	P210 Kanowit
	P177 Beaufort		Vacant	P216 Hulu Rajang	P165 Tanjong Piai	P136 Tangga Batu	P157 Pengerang	P113 Sepang	P118 Setiawangsa	P156 Kota Tinggi	P004 Langkawi	P081 Jerantut	P184 Libaran	P207 Igan	P137 Bukit Katil		P215 Kapit
	P119 Titiwangsa (Vacant)	P022 Pasir Mas		Vacant	P158 Tebrau	P077 Tanjong Malim	P003 Arau	P217 Bintulu	P149 Sri Gading	P187 Kinabatangan	P199 Serian (Deputy Minister)	Senator (Deputy Minister)	Senator (Deputy Minister)	Senator (Deputy Minister)		P084 Paya Besar	P169 Kota Belud
	P059 Bukit Gantang	P036 Kuala Terengganu	P016 Baling				P191 Kalabakan	P091 Rompin	P001 Padang Besar	P067 Kuala Kangsar	P146 Muar (Deputy Minister)				P198 Mambong (Deputy Minister)	P073 Pasir Salak	P188 Silam
	P012 Jerai	P013 Sik	P110 Klang			P173 Putatan		P032 Gua Musang	P163 Kulai	P041 Kepala Batas		P150 Batu Pahat (Deputy Minister)			P070 Kampar (Deputy Minister)	P035 Kuala Nerus	P079 Lipis
	P007 Padang Terap	P101 Hulu Langat	P050 Jelutong		P108 Shah Alam			E					P175 Papar (Deputy Minister)		P164 Pontian (Deputy Minister)	Vacant	P185 Batu Sapi
	P028 Pasir Puteh	P128 Seremban	P106 Petaling Jaya Utara	P130 Rasah			F				D			Vacant	P005 Jerlun (Deputy Minister)	P142 Labis	P200 Batang Sadong
	P138 Kota Melaka	P011 Pendang	P023 Rantau Panjang	P021 Kota Bharu	P020 Pengkalan Chepa	G						C	P159 Pasir Gudang (Minister)	P063 Tambun (Minister)	P214 Selangau (Deputy Minister)	P078 Cameron Highlands (Deputy Minister)	Senator (Deputy Minister)
	P076 Telok Intan	P014 Merbok	P111 Kota Raja	P031 Kuala Krai	P019 Tumpat	G			Sergeant-at-Arm			C	P189 Semporna (Minister)	P090 Bera (Minister)	P209 Julau (Deputy Minister)	P054 Gerik (Deputy Minister)	P167 Kudat (Deputy Minister)
	P145 Bakri	P082 Indera Mahkota	P057 Parit Buntar	P008 Pokok Sena	P025 Bachok	G						C	P042 Tasek Gelugor (Minister)	P140 Segamat (Minister)	P154 Mersing (Deputy Minister)	P194 Petra Jaya (Deputy Minister)	Vacant
	P117 Segambut	P010 Kuala Kedah	P096 Kuala Selangor	P024 Kubang Kerian	P037 Marang	G						C	P126 Jelebu (Minister)	P040 Kemaman (Minister)	P186 Sandakan (Deputy Minister)	P205 Saratok (Deputy Minister)	Senator (Deputy Minister)
	P172 Kota Kinabalu	P105 Petaling Jaya Selatan	P060 Taiping	P049 Tanjong	P045 Bukit Mertajam	H			the Mace			B	P153 Sembrong (Minister)	P089 Bentong (Minister)	P182 Pensiangan (Deputy Minister)	P148 Ayer Hitam (Deputy Minister)	P129 Kuala Pilah (Deputy Minister)
	P212 Sibu	P104 Kelana Jaya	P068 Beruas	P123 Cheras	P114 Kepong	H			the Mace			B	P061 Padang Rengas (Minister)	P133 Tampin (Minister)	P009 Alor Setar (Minister)	P220 Baram (Deputy Minister)	P088 Temerloh (Deputy Minister)
	P048 Bukit Bendera	P027 Tanah Merah	P046 Batu Kawan	P120 Bukit Bintang	P043 Bagan	H			the Mace			B	P174 Penampang (Minister)	P075 Bagan Datok (Minister)	Senator (Minister)	P093 Sungai Besar (Deputy Minister)	P056 Larut (Deputy Minister)
	P062 Sungai Siput	P026 Ketereh	P122 Seputeh	P065 Ipoh Barat	P064 Ipoh Timor	H			the Mace			B	Senator (Minister)	P095 Tanjong Karang (Minister)	Senator (Minister)	P201 Batang Lupar (Deputy Minister)	P152 Kluang (Deputy Minister)
	P195 Bandar Kuching	P112 Kuala Langat	P083 Kuantan	P099 Ampang	P029 Machang	I						A	P219 Miri (Minister)	P080 Raub (Minister)	Senator (Minister)	P196 Stampin (Deputy Minister)	Senator (Deputy Minister)
	P103 Puchong	P053 Balik Pulau	P071 Gopeng	P115 Batu	P098 Gombak	I						A	Senator (Minister)	P204 Betong (Minister)	P176 Kimanis (Minister)	Senator (Deputy Minister)	P072 Tapah (Deputy Minister)
	P102 Serdang	P132 Telok Kemang	P015 Sungai Petani	P097 Selayang	P124 Bandar Tun Razak	I						A	P143 Pagoh (Deputy Prime Minister)	P167 Kota Marudu (Minister)	Senator (Minister)	P134 Masjid Tanah (Deputy Minister)	P183 Beluran (Deputy Speaker)
	P066 Batu Gajah	P109 Kapar	P121 Lembah Pantai	P107 Subang	P044 Permatang Pauh (Opposition Leader)	I			Secretary			A	P085 Pekan (Prime Minister)	P030 Jeli (Minister)	P074 Lumut (Minister)	P006 Kubang Pasu (Deputy Minister)	P193 Santubong (Deputy Speaker)
	P051 Bukit Gelugor								Speaker
									Yang Di-Pertuan Agong

== Elected members by state ==
Shortcut:

Perlis | Kedah | Kelantan | Terengganu | Pulau Pinang | Perak | Pahang | Selangor | Kuala Lumpur | Putrajaya | Negeri Sembilan | Melaka | Johor | Labuan | Sabah | Sarawak

Unless noted otherwise, the MPs served the entire term of the parliament (from 28 April 2008 until 3 April 2013).

=== Perlis ===
No.	Federal Constituency	Member	Party
BN 3
P001	Padang Besar	Azmi Khalid	BN (UMNO)
P002	Kangar	Mohd Radzi Sheikh Ahmad	BN (UMNO)
P003	Arau	Ismail Kassim	BN (UMNO)

=== Kedah ===
No.	Federal Constituency	Member	Party
PAS 6 | BN 4 | PKR 3 | IND 2
P004	Langkawi	Abu Bakar Taib	BN (UMNO)
P005	Jerlun	Mukhriz Mahathir	BN (UMNO)
P006	Kubang Pasu	Mohd Johari Baharum	BN (UMNO)
P007	Padang Terap	Mohd Nasir Zakaria	PR (PAS)
P008	Pokok Sena	Mahfuz Omar	PR (PAS)
P009	Alor Star	Chor Chee Heung	BN (MCA)
P010	Kuala Kedah	Ahmad Kassim	PR (PKR)
P011	Pendang	Mohd Hayati Othman	PR (PAS)
P012	Jerai	Mohd Firdaus Jaafar	PR (PAS)
P013	Sik	Che Uda Che Nik	PR (PAS)
P014	Merbok	Rashid Din	PR (PKR)
P015	Sungai Petani	Johari Abdul	PR (PKR)
P016	Baling	Taib Azamudden Md Taib	PR (PAS)
P017	Padang Serai	Gobalakrishnan Nagapan (Note: Gobalakrishnan was elected to Parliament as a member of Parti Keadilan Rakyat but in January 2011, he left the party to sit as an independent.)	IND
P018	Kulim-Bandar Baharu	Zulkifli Nordin (Note: Zulkifli was elected to Parliament as a member of Parti Keadilan Rakyat but was dismissed by the party on 5 March 2010. He now sits as an independent.)	IND

=== Kelantan ===
No.	Federal Constituency	Member	Party
PAS 8 | PKR 3 | BN 2 | IND 1
P019	Tumpat	Kamarudin Jaffar	PR (PAS)
P020	Pengkalan Chepa	Abdul Halim Abdul Rahman	PR (PAS)
P021	Kota Bharu	Wan Abdul Rahim Wan Abdullah	PR (PAS)
P022	Pasir Mas	Ibrahim Ali (Note: Ibrahim was elected to Parliament on the ticket of the PAS but left the party to sit as an independent.)	IND
P023	Rantau Panjang	Siti Zailah Mohd Yusoff	PR (PAS)
P024	Kubang Kerian	Salahuddin Ayub	PR (PAS)
P025	Bachok	Nasharudin Mat Isa	PR (PAS)
P026	Ketereh	Ab Aziz Ab Kadir	PR (PKR)
P027	Tanah Merah	Amran Ab Ghani	PR (PKR)
P028	Pasir Puteh	Muhammad Husin	PR (PAS)
P029	Machang	Saifuddin Nasution Ismail	PR (PKR)
P030	Jeli	Mustapa Mohamed	BN (UMNO)
P031	Kuala Krai	Mohd Hatta Ramli	PR (PAS)
P032	Gua Musang	Tengku Razaleigh Hamzah	BN (UMNO)

=== Terengganu ===
No.	Federal Constituency	Member	Party
BN 6 | PAS 2
P033	Besut	Abdullah Md Zin	BN (UMNO)
P034	Setiu	Mohd Jidin Shafee	BN (UMNO)
P035	Kuala Nerus	Mohd Nasir Ibrahim Fikri	BN (UMNO)
P036	Kuala Terengganu	Mohd Abdul Wahid Endut from 17 January 2009 (Note: See 2009 Kuala Terengganu by-election.)	PR (PAS)
P036	Kuala Terengganu	Razali Ismail until 28 November 2008	BN (UMNO)
P037	Marang	Abdul Hadi Awang	PR (PAS)
P038	Hulu Terengganu	Mohd Nor Othman	BN (UMNO)
P039	Dungun	Matulidi Jusoh	BN (UMNO)
P040	Kemaman	Ahmad Shabery Cheek	BN (UMNO)

=== Penang ===
No.	Federal Constituency	Member	Party
DAP 7 | BN 2 | PKR 2 | IND 2
P041	Kepala Batas	Abdullah Ahmad Badawi	BN (UMNO)
P042	Tasek Gelugor	Nor Mohamed Yakcop	BN (UMNO)
P043	Bagan	Lim Guan Eng	PR (DAP)
P044	Permatang Pauh	Anwar Ibrahim from 26 August 2008 (Note: See 2008 Permatang Pauh by-election.)	PR (PKR)
P044	Permatang Pauh	Wan Azizah Wan Ismail until 31 July 2008	PR (PKR)
P045	Bukit Mertajam	Chong Eng	PR (DAP)
P046	Batu Kawan	Ramasamy Palanisamy	PR (DAP)
P047	Nibong Tebal	Tan Tee Beng (Note: Tan was elected to Parliament as a member of Keadilan but quit the party on 1 March 2010 to sit as an independent.)	IND
P048	Bukit Bendera	Liew Chin Tong	PR (DAP)
P049	Tanjong	Chow Kon Yeow	PR (DAP)
P050	Jelutong	Jeff Ooi Chuan Aun	PR (DAP)
P051	Bukit Gelugor	Karpal Singh Ram Singh	PR (DAP)
P052	Bayan Baru	Zahrain Mohamed Hashim (Note: Zahrain was elected to Parliament as a member of Keadilan but quit the party on 12 February 2010 to sit as an independent.)	IND
P053	Balik Pulau	Mohd Yusmadi Mohd Yusoff	PR (PKR)

=== Perak ===
No.	Federal Constituency	Member	Party
BN 13 | DAP 6 | PAS 2 | PKR 1 | PSM 1 | IND 1
P054	Gerik	Tan Lian Hoe	BN (Gerakan)
P055	Lenggong	Shamsul Anuar Nasarah	BN (UMNO)
P056	Larut	Hamzah Zainudin	BN (UMNO)
P057	Parit Buntar	Mujahid Yusof Rawa	PR (PAS)
P058	Bagan Serai	Mohsin Fadzli Samsuri (Note: Mohsin was elected to Parliament as a member of Keadilan but quit the party on 1 March 2010 to sit as an independent.)	IND
P059	Bukit Gantang	Mohammad Nizar Jamaluddin from 7 April 2009 (Note: see 2009 Bukit Gantang by-election.)	PR (PAS)
P059	Bukit Gantang	Roslan Shaharum until 9 February 2009	PR (PAS)
P060	Taiping	Nga Kor Ming	PR (DAP)
P061	Padang Rengas	Mohamed Nazri Abdul Aziz	BN (UMNO)
P062	Sungai Siput	Michael Jeyakumar Devaraj (Note: Jeyakumar is a member of the Socialist Party of Malaysia (PSM) but was elected to Parliament on the ticket of the People's Justice Party in the Pakatan Rakyat opposition coalition.)	PSM
P063	Tambun	Ahmad Husni Hanadzlah	BN (UMNO)
P064	Ipoh Timor	Lim Kit Siang	PR (DAP)
P065	Ipoh Barat	M. Kulasegaran	PR (DAP)
P066	Batu Gajah	Fong Po Kuan	PR (DAP)
P067	Kuala Kangsar	Rafidah Aziz	BN (UMNO)
P068	Beruas	Ngeh Koo Ham	PR (DAP)
P069	Parit	Mohd Nizar Zakaria	BN (UMNO)
P070	Kampar	Lee Chee Leong	BN (MCA)
P071	Gopeng	Lee Boon Chye	PR (PKR)
P072	Tapah	Saravanan Murugan	BN (MIC)
P073	Pasir Salak	Tajuddin Abdul Rahman	BN (UMNO)
P074	Lumut	Kong Cho Ha	BN (MCA)
P075	Bagan Datok	Ahmad Zahid Hamidi	BN (UMNO)
P076	Telok Intan	Manogaran Marimuthu	PR (DAP)
P077	Tanjong Malim	Ong Ka Chuan	BN (MCA)

=== Pahang ===
No.	Federal Constituency	Member	Party
BN 12 | PKR 2
P078	Cameron Highlands	Devamany S. Krishnasamy	BN (MIC)
P079	Lipis	Mohamad Shahrum Osman	BN (UMNO)
P080	Raub	Ng Yen Yen	BN (MCA)
P081	Jerantut	Tengku Azlan Sultan Abu Bakar	BN (UMNO)
P082	Indera Mahkota	Azan Ismail	PR (PKR)
P083	Kuantan	Fuziah Salleh	PR (PKR)
P084	Paya Besar	Abdul Manan Ismail	BN (UMNO)
P085	Pekan	Najib Tun Razak	BN (UMNO)
P086	Maran	Ismail Muttalib	BN (UMNO)
P087	Kuala Krau	Ismail Mohamed Said	BN (UMNO)
P088	Temerloh	Saifuddin Abdullah	BN (UMNO)
P089	Bentong	Liow Tiong Lai	BN (MCA)
P090	Bera	Ismail Sabri Yaakob	BN (UMNO)
P091	Rompin	Jamaluddin Jarjis	BN (UMNO)

=== Selangor ===
No.	Federal Constituency	Member	Party
PKR 8 | BN 6 | DAP 4 | PAS 4
P092	Sabak Bernam	Abdul Rahman Bakri	BN (UMNO)
P093	Sungai Besar	Noriah Kasnon	BN (UMNO)
P094	Hulu Selangor	Kamalanathan Panchanathan from 25 April 2010 (Note: see 2010 Hulu Selangor by-election.)	BN (MIC)
P094	Hulu Selangor	Zainal Abidin Ahmad until 25 March 2010	PR (PKR)
P095	Tanjong Karang	Noh Omar	BN (UMNO)
P096	Kuala Selangor	Dzulkefly Ahmad	PR (PAS)
P097	Selayang	William Leong Jee Keen	PR (PKR)
P098	Gombak	Mohamed Azmin Ali	PR (PKR)
P099	Ampang	Zuraida Kamarudin	PR (PKR)
P100	Pandan	Ong Tee Keat	BN (MCA)
P101	Hulu Langat	Che Rosli Che Mat	PR (PAS)
P102	Serdang	Teo Nie Ching	PR (DAP)
P103	Puchong	Gobind Singh Deo	PR (DAP)
P104	Kelana Jaya	Loh Gwo Burne	PR (PKR)
P105	Petaling Jaya Selatan	Hee Loy Sian	PR (PKR)
P106	Petaling Jaya Utara	Tony Pua Kiam Wee	PR (DAP)
P107	Subang	Sivarasa K. Rasiah	PR (PKR)
P108	Shah Alam	Khalid Abdul Samad	PR (PAS)
P109	Kapar	Manikavasagam Sundaram	PR (PKR)
P110	Klang	Charles Santiago	PR (DAP)
P111	Kota Raja	Siti Mariah Mahmud	PR (PAS)
P112	Kuala Langat	Abdullah Sani Abdul Hamid	PR (PKR)
P113	Sepang	Mohd Zin Mohamed	BN (UMNO)

=== Federal Territory of Kuala Lumpur ===
No.	Federal Constituency	Member	Party
DAP 5 | PKR 3 | BN 1 | IND 1 | VAC 1
P114	Kepong	Tan Seng Giaw	PR (DAP)
P115	Batu	Chua Tian Chang	PR (PKR)
P116	Wangsa Maju	Wee Choo Keong (Note: Wee was elected as a member of PKR but in May 2010 left the party to sit as an independent.)	IND
P117	Segambut	Lim Lip Eng	PR (DAP)
P118	Setiawangsa	Zulhasnan Rafique	BN (UMNO)
P119	Titiwangsa	Vacant since 17 July 2011 (Note: The seat remained vacant after her death.)	VAC
P119	Titiwangsa	Lo' Lo' Mohd Ghazali until 17 July 2011	PR (PAS)
P120	Bukit Bintang	Fong Kui Lun	PR (DAP)
P121	Lembah Pantai	Nurul Izzah Anwar	PR (PKR)
P122	Seputeh	Teresa Kok Suh Sim	PR (DAP)
P123	Cheras	Tan Kok Wai	PR (DAP)
P124	Bandar Tun Razak	Abdul Khalid Ibrahim	PR (PKR)

=== Federal Territory of Putrajaya ===
No.	Federal Constituency	Member	Party
BN 1
P125	Putrajaya	Tengku Adnan Tengku Mansor	BN (UMNO)

=== Negeri Sembilan ===
No.	Federal Constituency	Member	Party
BN 5 | DAP 2 | PKR 1
P126	Jelebu	Rais Yatim	BN (UMNO)
P127	Jempol	Lilah Yasin	BN (UMNO)
P128	Seremban	John Fernandez	PR (DAP)
P129	Kuala Pilah	Hasan Malek	BN (UMNO)
P130	Rasah	Loke Siew Fook	PR (DAP)
P131	Rembau	Khairy Jamaluddin	BN (UMNO)
P132	Telok Kemang	Kamarul Bahrin Abbas	PR (PKR)
P133	Tampin	Shaziman Abu Mansor	BN (UMNO)

=== Malacca ===
No.	Federal Constituency	Member	Party
BN 5 | DAP 1
P134	Masjid Tanah	Abu Seman Yusop	BN (UMNO)
P135	Alor Gajah	Fong Chan Onn	BN (MCA)
P136	Tangga Batu	Idris Haron	BN (UMNO)
P137	Bukit Katil	Md Sirat Abu	BN (UMNO)
P138	Kota Melaka	Sim Tong Him	PR (DAP)
P139	Jasin	Ahmad Hamzah	BN (UMNO)

=== Johor ===
No.	Federal Constituency	Member	Party
BN 25 | DAP 1
P140	Segamat	Subramaniam Sathasivam	BN (MIC)
P141	Sekijang	Baharum Mohamed	BN (UMNO)
P142	Labis	Chua Tee Yong	BN (MCA)
P143	Pagoh	Muhyiddin Yassin	BN (UMNO)
P144	Ledang	Hamim Samuri	BN (UMNO)
P145	Bakri	Er Teck Hwa	PR (DAP)
P146	Muar	Razali Ibrahim	BN (UMNO)
P147	Parit Sulong	Noraini Ahmad	BN (UMNO)
P148	Ayer Hitam	Wee Ka Siong	BN (MCA)
P149	Sri Gading	Mohamad Aziz	BN (UMNO)
P150	Batu Pahat	Mohd Puad Zarkashi	BN (UMNO)
P151	Simpang Renggam	Liang Teck Meng	BN (Gerakan)
P152	Kluang	Hou Kok Chung	BN (MCA)
P153	Sembrong	Hishammuddin Hussein	BN (UMNO)
P154	Mersing	Abdul Latiff Ahmad	BN (UMNO)
P155	Tenggara	Halimah Mohd Sadique	BN (UMNO)
P156	Kota Tinggi	Syed Hamid Albar	BN (UMNO)
P157	Pengerang	Azalina Othman Said	BN (UMNO)
P158	Tebrau	Teng Boon Soon	BN (MCA)
P159	Pasir Gudang	Mohamed Khaled Nordin	BN (UMNO)
P160	Johor Bahru	Shahrir Abdul Samad	BN (UMNO)
P161	Pulai	Nur Jazlan Mohamed	BN (UMNO)
P162	Gelang Patah	Tan Ah Eng	BN (MCA)
P163	Kulai	Ong Ka Ting	BN (MCA)
P164	Pontian	Ahmad Maslan	BN (UMNO)
P165	Tanjong Piai	Wee Jeck Seng	BN (MCA)

=== Federal Territory of Labuan ===
No.	Federal Constituency	Member	Party
BN 1
P166	Labuan	Yussof Mahal	BN (UMNO)

=== Sabah ===
No.	Federal Constituency	Member	Party
BN 19 | SAPP 2 | DAP 1 | IND 2
P167	Kudat	Abdul Rahim Bakri	BN (UMNO)
P168	Kota Marudu	Maximus Johnity Ongkili	BN (PBS)
P169	Kota Belud	Abdul Rahman Dahlan	BN (UMNO)
P170	Tuaran	Wilfred Bumburing (Note: Bumburing was elected as a Barisan Nasional MP but in July 2012 joined the Pakatan Rakyat opposition as an independent.)	IND
P171	Sepanggar	Eric Majimbun (Note: Majimbun was elected to Parliament on the ticket of the Barisan National, but SAPP officially withdrew from BN in September 2008 to become independent.)	SAPP
P172	Kota Kinabalu	Hiew King Cheu	PR (DAP)
P173	Putatan	Marcus Mojigoh	BN (UPKO)
P174	Penampang	Bernard Giluk Dompok	BN (UPKO)
P175	Papar	Rosnah Abdul Rashid Shirlin	BN (UMNO)
P176	Kimanis	Anifah Aman	BN (UMNO)
P177	Beaufort	Lajim Ukin (Note: Lajim was elected as a Barisan Nasional MP but in July 2012 joined the Pakatan Rakyat opposition.)	IND
P178	Sipitang	Sapawi Ahmad	BN (UMNO)
P179	Ranau	Siringan Gubat	BN (UPKO)
P180	Keningau	Joseph Pairin Kitingan	BN (PBS)
P181	Tenom	Raime Unggi	BN (UMNO)
P182	Pensiangan	Joseph Kurup	BN (PBRS)
P183	Beluran	Ronald Kiandee (Deputy Speaker)	BN (UMNO)
P184	Libaran	Juslie Ajirol	BN (UMNO)
P185	Batu Sapi	Linda Tsen Thau Lin from 4 November 2010 (Note: Tsen was elected to Parliament in the 2010 Batu Sapi by-election after the death of her husband.)	BN (PBS)
P185	Batu Sapi	Edmund Chong Ket Wah until 9 October 2010	BN (PBS)
P186	Sandakan	Liew Vui Keong	BN (LDP)
P187	Kinabatangan	Bung Moktar Radin	BN (UMNO)
P188	Silam	Salleh Kalbi	BN (UMNO)
P189	Semporna	Shafie Apdal	BN (UMNO)
P190	Tawau	Chua Soon Bui (Note: Chua was elected to Parliament on the ticket of the Barisan National, but SAPP officially withdrew from BN in September 2008 to become independent.)	SAPP
P191	Kalabakan	Abdul Ghapur Salleh	BN (UMNO)

=== Sarawak ===
No.	Federal Constituency	Member	Party
BN 29 | DAP 2
P192	Mas Gading	Tiki Lafe	BN (SPDP)
P193	Santubong	Wan Junaidi Tuanku Jaafar (Deputy Speaker)	BN (PBB)
P194	Petra Jaya	Fadillah Yusof	BN (PBB)
P195	Bandar Kuching	Chong Chieng Jen	PR (DAP)
P196	Stampin	Yong Khoon Seng	BN (SUPP)
P197	Kota Samarahan	Sulaiman Abdul Rahman Taib	BN (PBB)
P198	Mambong	James Dawos Mamit	BN (PBB)
P199	Serian	Richard Riot Jaem	BN (SUPP)
P200	Batang Sadong	Nancy Shukri	BN (PBB)
P201	Batang Lupar	Rohani Abdul Karim	BN (PBB)
P202	Sri Aman	Masir Kujat	BN (PRS)
P203	Lubok Antu	William Nyallau Badak	BN (PRS)
P204	Betong	Douglas Uggah Embas	BN (PBB)
P205	Saratok	Jelaing Mersat	BN (SPDP)
P206	Tanjong Manis	Norah Abdul Rahman	BN (PBB)
P207	Igan	Wahab Dolah	BN (PBB)
P208	Sarikei	Ding Kuong Hiing	BN (SUPP)
P209	Julau	Joseph Salang Gandum	BN (PRS)
P210	Kanowit	Aaron Ago Dagang	BN (PRS)
P211	Lanang	Tiong Thai King	BN (SUPP)
P212	Sibu	Wong Ho Leng from 16 May 2010 (Note: see 2010 Sibu by-election)	PR (DAP)
P212	Sibu	Robert Lau Hoi Chew until 9 April 2010	BN (SUPP)
P213	Mukah	Leo Michael Toyad	BN (PBB)
P214	Selangau	Joseph Entulu Belaun	BN (PRS)
P215	Kapit	Alexander Nanta Linggi	BN (PBB)
P216	Hulu Rajang	Billy Abit Joo	BN (PRS)
P217	Bintulu	Tiong King Sing	BN (SPDP)
P218	Sibuti	Ahmad Lai Bujang	BN (PBB)
P219	Miri	Peter Chin Fah Kui	BN (SUPP)
P220	Baram	Jacob Dungau Sagan	BN (SPDP)
P221	Limbang	Hasbi Habibollah	BN (PBB)
P222	Lawas	Henry Sum Agong	BN (PBB)
