= Results of the 2008 Malaysian general election by parliamentary constituency =

Dewan Rakyat results of the 2013 Malaysian General Election (equal-area representation)

These are the election results of the 2008 Malaysian general election by parliamentary constituency. These members of parliament (MPs) representing their constituency from the first sitting of 12th Malaysian Parliament to its dissolution.

The parliamentary election deposit was set at RM 10,000 per candidate. Similar to previous elections, the election deposit will be forfeited if the particular candidate had failed to secure at least 12.5% or one-eighth of the votes.

== Perlis ==
#	Constituency	Winner	Votes	Votes %	Opponent(s)	Votes	Votes %	Majority	Incumbent	Eligible voters	Malay voters	Chinese voters	Indian voters	Others voters	Muslim Bumiputera voters	Non-Muslim Bumiputera voters	Voter turnout	Voter turnout %	Spoilt votes	Spoilt votes %
P001	Padang Besar	Azmi Khalid (BN–UMNO)	16,991	58.0%	Zolkharnain Abidin (PR–PAS)	11,643	39.7%	5,348	Azmi Khalid (BN–UMNO)	36,613	84%	12%		4%			29,310	80.1%	674	2.3%
P002	Kangar	Mohd Radzi Sheikh Ahmad (BN–UMNO)	23,821	68.2%	Tunku Abdul Rahman Tunku Ismail (PR–PKR)	10,150	29.0%	13,671	Mohd Radzi Sheikh Ahmad (BN–UMNO)	43,591	79%	18%	2%				34,946	80.2%	808	2.3%
P003	Arau	Ismail Kassim (BN–UMNO)	16,451	49.4%	Haron Din (PR–PAS)	16,151	48.5%	300	Syed Razlan Syed Putra Jamalullail (BN–UMNO)	39,877	87%	9%		3%			33,276	83.5%	586	1.8%

== Kedah ==
#	Constituency	Winner	Votes	Votes %	Opponent(s)	Votes	Votes %	Majority	Incumbent	Eligible voters	Malay voters	Chinese voters	Indian voters	Others voters	Muslim Bumiputera voters	Non-Muslim Bumiputera voters	Voter turnout	Voter turnout %	Spoilt votes	Spoilt votes %
P004	Langkawi	Abu Bakar Taib (BN–UMNO)	13,762	59.1%	Wan Salleh Wan Isa (PR–PKR)	8,792	37.8%	4,970	Abu Bakar Taib (BN–UMNO)	29,567	91%	7%	2%				23,273	78.7%	670	2.9%
P005	Jerlun	Mukhriz Mahathir (BN–UMNO)	19,424	52.2%	Idris Ahmad (PR–PAS)	17,219	46.2%	2,205	Abdul Rahman Ariffin (BN–UMNO)	45,513	90%	8%		2%			37,242	81.8%	599	1.6%
P006	Kubang Pasu	Mohd Johari Baharum (BN–UMNO)	24,179	57.3%	Abdul Isa Ismail (PR–PAS)	17,119	40.5%	7,060	Mohd Johari Baharum (BN–UMNO)	53,323	96%	3%					42,226	79.2%	928	2.2%
P007	Padang Terap	Mohd Nasir Zakaria (PR–PAS)	15,003	49.3%	Ghazali Ibrahim (BN–UMNO)	14,634	48.1%	369	Ghazali Ibrahim (BN–UMNO)	35,403	93%			6%			30,445	86.0%	770	2.5%
P008	Pokok Sena	Mahfuz Omar (PR–PAS)	29,687	53.7%	Abdul Rahman Ibrahim (BN–UMNO)	23,956	43.3%	5,731	Abdul Rahman Ibrahim (BN–UMNO)	69,631	79%	18%	2%				55,318	79.4%	1,039	1.9%
P009	Alor Setar	Chor Chee Heung (BN–MCA)	20,741	48.0%	Gooi Hsiao-Leung (PR–PKR)	20,557	47.6%	184	Chor Chee Heung (BN–MCA)	58,957	63%	33%	4%				43,206	73.3%	1,757	4.1%
P010	Kuala Kedah	Ahmad Kassim (PR–PKR)	35,689	54.3%	Hashim Jahaya (BN–UMNO)	28,671	43.6%	7,018	Hashim Jahaya (BN–UMNO)	83,142	79%	20%					65,750	79.1%	1,385	2.1%
P011	Pendang	Mohd Hayati Othman (PR–PAS)	27,311	52.9%	Md Rozai Shafian (BN–UMNO)	23,238	45.0%	4,073	Mohd Hayati Othman (BA–PAS)	61,346	89%	6%		5%			51,645	84.2%	991	1.9%
P012	Jerai	Mohd Firdaus Jaafar (PR–PAS)	26,510	51.2%	Badruddin Amiruldin (BN–UMNO)	24,211	46.7%	2,299	Badruddin Amiruldin (BN–UMNO)	65,739	79%	14%	6%				51,791	78.8%	1,070	2.1%
P013	Sik	Che Uda Che Nik (PR–PAS)	16,864	48.5%	Othman Desa (BN–UMNO)	16,383	47.1%	481	Wan Azmi Wan Ariffin (BN–UMNO)	40,339	93%	2%		5%			34,752	86.2%	505	1.5%
P014	Merbok	Rashid Din (PR–PKR)	25,541	51.4%	Tajul Urus Mat Zain (BN–UMNO)	22,443	45.1%	3,098	Zainuddin Maidin (BN–UMNO)	64,443	66%	16%	17%				49,718	77.2%	1,338	2.7%
P015	Sungai Petani	Johari Abdul (PR–PKR)	33,822	57.0%	Zainuddin Maidin (BN–UMNO)	24,441	41.2%	9,381	Mahadzir Mohd Khir (BN–UMNO)	76,284	60%	29%	11%				59,378	77.8%	986	1.7%
P016	Baling	Taib Azamudden Md Taib (PR–PAS)	36,074	54.9%	Abdul Azeez Abdul Rahim (BN–UMNO)	28,461	43.3%	7,613	Mashitah Ibrahim (BN–UMNO)	78,784	88%	6%	5%				65,764	83.5%	1,154	1.8%
P017	Padang Serai	Gobalakrishnan Nagapan (PR–PKR)	28,774	61.1%	Boey Chin Gan (BN–MCA)	17,036	36.2%	11,738	Lim Bee Kau (BN–MCA)	59,218	55%	23%	22%				47,125	79.6%	1,259	2.7%
P018	Kulim-Bandar Baharu	Zulkifli Noordin (PR–PKR)	22,255	55.4%	Abd. Aziz Sheikh Fadzir (BN–UMNO)	16,672	41.5%	5,583	Abdul Kadir Sheikh Fadzir (BN–UMNO)	51,995	70%	19%	12%				40,182	77.3%	1,022	2.5%

== Kelantan ==
#	Constituency	Winner	Votes	Votes %	Opponent(s)	Votes	Votes %	Majority	Incumbent	Eligible voters	Malay voters	Chinese voters	Indian voters	Others voters	Muslim Bumiputera voters	Non-Muslim Bumiputera voters	Voter turnout	Voter turnout %	Spoilt votes	Spoilt votes %
P019	Tumpat	Kamarudin Jaffar (PR–PAS)	36,714	56.3%	Asyraf Wajdi Dusuki (BN–UMNO)	27,337	41.9%	9,377	Kamarudin Jaffar (BA–PAS)	80,072	92%	3%		4%			65,254	81.5%	1,032	1.6%
P020	Pengkalan Chepa	Abdul Halim Abdul Rahman (PR–PAS)	26,763	62.2%	Rahim Mohd Zain (BN–UMNO)	15,452	35.9%	11,311	Abdul Halim Abdul Rahman (BA–PAS)	52,350	98%	2%					43,049	82.2%	564	1.3%
P021	Kota Bharu	Wan Abdul Rahim Wan Abdullah (PR–PAS)	32,129	59.8%	Mohamad Fatmi Che Salleh (BN–UMNO)	20,841	38.8%	11,288	Zaid Ibrahim (BN–UMNO)	68,261	81%	18%					53,710	78.7%	609	1.1%
P022	Pasir Mas	Ibrahim Ali (PR–PAS)	28,673	58.1%	Ahmed Rasdi Mahmed (BN–UMNO)	19,682	39.9%	8,991	Ismail Noh (BA–PAS)	59,640	96%	4%					49,344	82.7%	864	1.8%
P023	Rantau Panjang	Siti Zailah Mohd Yusoff (PR–PAS)	19,344	54.6%	Mohd Afandi Yusoff (BN–UMNO)	14,858	41.9%	4,486	Abdul Fatah Haron (BA–PAS)	45,384	98%						35,451	78.1%	837	2.4%
P023	Rantau Panjang	Siti Zailah Mohd Yusoff (PR–PAS)	19,344	54.6%	Isma Airfath Hassanuddin (IND)	330	0.9%	4,486	Abdul Fatah Haron (BA–PAS)	45,384	98%						35,451	78.1%	837	2.4%
P024	Kubang Kerian	Salahuddin Ayub (PR–PAS)	27,179	61.1%	Abdul Ghani Mamat (BN–UMNO)	16,537	37.2%	10,642	Salahuddin Ayub (BA–PAS)	53,496	98%	2%					44,474	83.1%	638	1.4%
P025	Bachok	Nasharudin Mat Isa (PR–PAS)	28,835	51.7%	Awang Adek Hussin (BN–UMNO)	25,934	46.5%	2,901	Awang Adek Hussin (BN–UMNO)	64,808	98%						55,724	86.0%	811	1.5%
P026	Ketereh	Abdul Aziz Abdul Kadir (PR–PKR)	21,738	49.0%	Annuar Musa (BN–UMNO)	21,338	48.1%	400	Md Alwi Che Ahmad (BN–UMNO)	52,240	97%	2%					44,377	85.0%	993	2.2%
P027	Tanah Merah	Amran Abdul Ghani (PR–PKR)	17,554	48.6%	Shaari Hassan (BN–UMNO)	15,970	44.2%	1,584	Shaari Hassan (BN–UMNO)	44,347	94%	4%					36,126	81.5%	1,064	3.0%
P027	Tanah Merah	Amran Abdul Ghani (PR–PKR)	17,554	48.6%	Asmadi Abu Bakar (IND)	1,439	4.0%	1,584	Shaari Hassan (BN–UMNO)	44,347	94%	4%					36,126	81.5%	1,064	3.0%
P028	Pasir Puteh	Muhammad Husin (PR–PAS)	28,365	52.7%	Amran Mat Nor (BN–UMNO)	24,397	45.4%	3,968	Kalthom Othman (BA–PAS)	64,393	98%						53,778	83.5%	886	1.7%
P029	Machang	Saifuddin Nasution Ismail (PR–PKR)	21,041	50.7%	Sazmi Miah (BN–UMNO)	19,581	47.2%	1,460	Sazmi Miah (BN–UMNO)	49,157	95%	4%					41,494	84.4%	748	1.8%
P030	Jeli	Mustapa Mohamed (BN–UMNO)	17,168	56.2%	Mohd Apandi Mohamad (PR–PAS)	12,732	41.7%	4,436	Mustapa Mohamed (BN–UMNO)	36,298	99%						30,555	84.2%	474	1.6%
P031	Kuala Krai	Mohd Hatta Ramli (PR–PAS)	23,562	54.8%	Che Musa Che Omar (BN–UMNO)	18,578	43.2%	4,984	Mohammad Razali Che Mamat (BN–UMNO)	52,250	93%	5%	2%				43,013	82.3%	756	1.8%
P032	Gua Musang	Tengku Razaleigh Hamzah (BN–UMNO)	14,063	57.9%	Zulkefli Mohamed (PR–PAS)	9,669	39.8%	4,394	Tengku Razaleigh Hamzah (BN–UMNO)	29,986	83%	8%		8%			24,283	83.8%	489	2.0%

== Terengganu ==
#	Constituency	Winner	Votes	Votes %	Opponent(s)	Votes	Votes %	Majority	Incumbent	Eligible voters	Malay voters	Chinese voters	Indian voters	Others voters	Muslim Bumiputera voters	Non-Muslim Bumiputera voters	Voter turnout	Voter turnout %	Spoilt votes	Spoilt votes %
P033	Besut	Abdullah Md Zin (BN–UMNO)	29,376	59.6%	Husain Awang (PR–PAS)	18,786	38.1%	10,590	Abdullah Md Zin (BN–UMNO)	58,353	97%	2%					49,303	84.5%	668	1.4%
P034	Setiu	Mohd Jidin Shafee (BN–UMNO)	26,610	56.8%	Mohd Pauzi Muda (PR–PAS)	19,378	41.4%	7,232	Mohd Yusof Majid (BN–UMNO)	54,520	99%						46,821	85.9%	833	1.8%
P035	Kuala Nerus	Mohd Nasir Ibrahim Fikri (BN–UMNO)	26,439	50.3%	Mohd Shukrimun Shamsuddin (PR–PAS)	25,098	47.8%	1,341	Che Azmi Abd Rahman (BN–UMNO)	61,214	99%						52,539	85.8%	713	1.4%
P036	Kuala Terengganu	Razali Ismail (BN–UMNO)	32,562	49.2%	Mohamad Sabu (PR–PAS)	31,934	48.2%	628	Razali Ismail (BN–UMNO)	80,325	88%	11%					66,231	82.5%	931	1.4%
P036	Kuala Terengganu	Razali Ismail (BN–UMNO)	32,562	49.2%	Maimun Yusuf (IND)	685	1.0%	628	Razali Ismail (BN–UMNO)	80,325	88%	11%					66,231	82.5%	931	1.4%
P037	Marang	Abdul Hadi Awang (PR–PAS)	33,435	51.4%	Ahmad Ramzi Mohamad Zubir (BN–UMNO)	30,688	47.2%	2,747	Abdul Rahman Bakar (BN–UMNO)	74,813	98%	2%					65,008	86.9%	806	1.2%
P038	Hulu Terengganu	Mohd Nor Othman (BN–UMNO)	27,784	60.4%	Kamaruzaman Abdullah (PR–PAS)	17,324	37.7%	10,460	Tengku Putera Tengku Awang (BN–UMNO)	52,515	99%						45,971	87.5%	709	1.5%
P039	Dungun	Matulidi Jusoh (BN–UMNO)	29,264	53.7%	Shamsul Iskandar Md. Akin (PR–PKR)	24,270	44.6%	4,994	Rosli Mat Hassan (BN–UMNO)	64,851	95%	4%					54,464	84.0%	930	1.7%
P040	Kemaman	Ahmad Shabery Cheek (BN–UMNO)	37,199	59.2%	Fariz Musa (PR–PKR)	24,516	39.0%	12,683	Ahmad Shabery Cheek (BN–UMNO)	75,006	92%	7%					62,868	83.8%	1,077	1.7%

== Penang ==
#	Constituency	Winner	Votes	Votes %	Opponent(s)	Votes	Votes %	Majority	Incumbent	Eligible voters	Malay voters	Chinese voters	Indian voters	Others voters	Muslim Bumiputera voters	Non-Muslim Bumiputera voters	Voter turnout	Voter turnout %	Spoilt votes	Spoilt votes %
P041	Kepala Batas	Abdullah Ahmad Badawi (BN–UMNO)	23,445	64.5%	Subri Arshad (PR–PAS)	12,199	33.6%	11,246	Abdullah Ahmad Badawi (BN–UMNO)	43,019	75%	21%	4%				36,328	84.5%	634	1.8%
P042	Tasek Gelugor	Nor Mohamed Yakcop (BN–UMNO)	20,448	54.8%	Ismail Salleh (PR–PAS)	15,901	42.6%	4,547	Mohd Shariff Omar (BN–UMNO)	42,404	77%	15%	8%				37,308	88.0%	600	1.6%
P043	Bagan	Lim Guan Eng (PR–DAP)	33,748	73.0%	Song Choy Leng (BN–MCA)	11,678	25.3%	22,070	Lim Hock Seng (DAP)	59,385	15%	71%	14%				46,227	77.8%	766	1.7%
P044	Permatang Pauh	Wan Azizah Wan Ismail (PR–PKR)	30,348	63.3%	Pirdaus Ismail (BN–UMNO)	16,950	35.3%	13,398	Wan Azizah Wan Ismail (BA–PKR)	58,449	69%	25%	6%				47,963	82.1%	636	1.3%
P045	Bukit Mertajam	Chong Eng (PR–DAP)	37,882	74.5%	Ong Tang Chuan (BN–MCA)	11,985	23.6%	25,897	Chong Eng (DAP)	64,080	18%	74%	8%				50,823	79.3%	931	1.8%
P046	Batu Kawan	Ramasamy Palanisamy (PR–DAP)	23,067	61.9%	Koh Tsu Koon (BN–Gerakan)	13,582	36.4%	9,485	Huan Cheng Guan (BN–Gerakan)	47,244	20%	56%	24%				37,292	78.9%	640	1.7%
P047	Nibong Tebal	Tan Tee Beng (PR–PKR)	20,210	53.0%	Zainal Abidin Osman (BN–UMNO)	17,123	44.9%	3,087	Zainal Abidin Osman (BN–UMNO)	47,540	46%	38%	17%				38,129	80.2%	784	2.1%
P048	Bukit Bendera	Liew Chin Tong (PR–DAP)	31,243	66.3%	Chia Kwang Chye (BN–Gerakan)	15,131	32.1%	16,112	Chia Kwang Chye (BN–Gerakan)	64,545	15%	75%	10%				47,105	73.0%	642	1.4%
P049	Tanjong	Chow Kon Yeow (PR–DAP)	28,248	72.9%	Khaw Veon Szu (BN–Gerakan)	9,759	25.2%	18,489	Chow Kon Yeow (DAP)	53,188	8%	86%	6%				38,734	72.8%	631	1.6%
P050	Jelutong	Jeff Ooi Chuan Aun (PR–DAP)	30,493	65.7%	Thor Teong Gee (BN–Gerakan)	14,247	30.7%	16,246	Lee Kah Choon (BN–Gerakan)	60,386	20%	68%	11%				46,406	76.9%	41	0.1%
P050	Jelutong	Jeff Ooi Chuan Aun (PR–DAP)	30,493	65.7%	Badrul Zaman P.S. Md Zakariah (IND)	882	1.9%	16,246	Lee Kah Choon (BN–Gerakan)	60,386	20%	68%	11%				46,406	76.9%	41	0.1%
P051	Bukit Gelugor	Karpal Singh Ram Singh (PR–DAP)	35,140	69.5%	Koay Har Huah (BN–MCA)	14,125	27.9%	21,015	Karpal Singh Ram Singh (DAP)	65,614	17%	75%	8%				50,553	77.1%	707	1.4%
P052	Bayan Baru	Zahrain Mohamed Hashim (PR–PKR)	27,618	59.5%	Ooi Swee Kim (BN–MCA)	16,589	35.7%	11,029	Wong Kam Hoong (BN–MCA)	60,713	41%	49%	10%				46,418	76.5%	655	1.4%
P053	Balik Pulau	Mohd Yusmadi Mohd Yusoff (PR–PKR)	15,749	50.2%	Norraessah Mohamad (BN–UMNO)	15,041	47.9%	708	Hilmi Yahaya (BN–UMNO)	39,265	61%	35%	3%				31,391	80.0%	601	1.9%

== Perak ==
#	Constituency	Winner	Votes	Votes %	Opponent(s)	Votes	Votes %	Majority	Incumbent	Eligible voters	Malay voters	Chinese voters	Indian voters	Others voters	Muslim Bumiputera voters	Non-Muslim Bumiputera voters	Voter turnout	Voter turnout %	Spoilt votes	Spoilt votes %
P054	Gerik	Tan Lian Hoe (BN–Gerakan)	12,526	61.1%	Mohd. Noor Abdul Rahman (PR–PAS)	6,953	33.9%	5,573	Wan Hashim Wan Teh (BN–UMNO)	26,229	72%	18%		5%			20,493	78.1%	649	3.2%
P055	Lenggong	Shamsul Anuar Nasarah (BN–UMNO)	10,992	63.0%	Muhamad Zulkifli Mohamad Zakaria (PR–PAS)	6,073	34.8%	4,919	Khamsiyah Yeop (BN–UMNO)	23,223	81%	17%	2%				17,436	75.1%	311	1.8%
P056	Larut	Hamzah Zainudin (BN–UMNO)	15,878	51.9%	Mohd. Dhari Othman (PR–PAS)	13,967	45.7%	1,911	Raja Ahmad Zainuddin Raja Omar (BN–UMNO)	39,697	87%	6%	6%				30,589	77.1%	687	2.3%
P057	Parit Buntar	Mujahid Yusof Rawa (PR–PAS)	21,221	59.6%	Abdul Raman Suliman (BN–UMNO)	13,670	38.4%	7,551	Abdul Hamid Zainal Abidin (BN–UMNO)	45,219	67%	28%	5%				35,592	78.7%	618	1.7%
P058	Bagan Serai	Mohsin Fadzli Samsuri (PR–PKR)	18,943	52.3%	Zainal Abidin Zin (BN–UMNO)	15,530	42.9%	3,413	Zainal Abidin Zin (BN–UMNO)	47,111	74%	16%	10%				36,237	76.9%	1,186	3.3%
P059	Bukit Gantang	Roslan Shaharum (PR–PAS)	20,015	49.7%	Abdul Azim Mohd Zabidi (BN–UMNO)	18,449	45.8%	1,566	Tan Lian Hoe (BN–Gerakan)	55,471	64%	27%	9%				40,301	72.7%	851	2.1%
P059	Bukit Gantang	Roslan Shaharum (PR–PAS)	20,015	49.7%	Mohganan P. Manikam (IND)	872	2.2%	1,566	Tan Lian Hoe (BN–Gerakan)	55,471	64%	27%	9%				40,301	72.7%	851	2.1%
P060	Taiping	Nga Kor Ming (PR–DAP)	28,098	59.6%	M. Kayveas (BN–PPP)	16,800	35.7%	11,298	M. Kayveas (BN–PPP)	65,889	35%	50%	13%				47,123	71.5%	1,612	3.4%
P061	Padang Rengas	Mohamed Nazri Abdul Aziz (BN–UMNO)	9,830	53.6%	Alias Zenon (PR–PKR)	8,081	44.0%	1,749	Mohamed Nazri Abdul Aziz (BN–UMNO)	24,397	74%	19%	7%				18,350	75.2%	362	2.0%
P062	Sungai Siput	Michael Jeyakumar Devaraj (PR–PKR)	16,458	49.6%	Samy Vellu Sangalimuthu (BN–MIC)	14,637	44.1%	1,821	Samy Vellu Sangalimuthu (BN–MIC)	47,424	36%	40%	23%				33,154	69.9%	1,001	3.0%
P062	Sungai Siput	Michael Jeyakumar Devaraj (PR–PKR)	16,458	49.6%	Nor Rizan Oon (IND)	864	2.6%	1,821	Samy Vellu Sangalimuthu (BN–MIC)	47,424	36%	40%	23%				33,154	69.9%	1,001	3.0%
P063	Tambun	Ahmad Husni Hanadzlah (BN–UMNO)	27,942	53.9%	Mohamad Asri Othman (PR–PKR)	22,556	43.5%	5,386	Ahmad Husni Hanadzlah (BN–UMNO)	68,966	64%	24%	11%				51,844	75.2%	927	1.8%
P064	Ipoh Timor	Lim Kit Siang (PR–DAP)	37,364	69.2%	Liew Mun Hon (BN–MCA)	15,422	28.6%	21,942	Lim Kit Siang (DAP)	76,647	12%	82%	5%				53,994	70.5%	707	1.3%
P065	Ipoh Barat	Kulasegaran Murugeson (PR–DAP)	32,576	64.3%	Yik Phooi Hong (BN–MCA)	17,042	33.7%	15,534	Kulasegaran Murugeson (DAP)	69,773	13%	65%	22%				50,641	72.6%	829	1.6%
P066	Batu Gajah	Fong Po Kuan (PR–DAP)	39,922	70.9%	Cheah Yoke Can (BN–MCA)	15,295	27.2%	24,627	Fong Po Kuan (DAP)	77,313	10%	78%	12%				56,270	72.8%	911	1.6%
P067	Kuala Kangsar	Rafidah Aziz (BN–UMNO)	10,735	51.7%	Khairudin Abdul Malik (PR–PAS)	9,277	44.7%	1,458	Rafidah Aziz (BN–UMNO)	28,325	66%	26%	7%				20,773	73.3%	373	1.8%
P068	Beruas	Ngeh Koo Ham (PR–DAP)	15,831	51.4%	Chang Ko Youn (BN–Gerakan)	14,003	45.4%	1,828	Lim Keng Yaik (BN–Gerakan)	43,273	31%	55%	14%				30,821	71.2%	889	2.9%
P069	Parit	Mohd Nizar Zakaria (BN–UMNO)	12,399	54.9%	Najihatussalehah Ahmad (PR–PAS)	9,526	42.2%	2,873	Nasarudin Hashim (BN–UMNO)	28,859	92%	3%	3%				22,598	78.3%	628	2.8%
P070	Kampar	Lee Chee Leong (BN–MCA)	20,126	51.7%	Keong Meng Sing (PR–DAP)	17,429	44.7%	2,697	Hew See Yong (BN–MCA)	59,784	27%	63%	10%				38,953	65.2%	1,048	2.7%
P071	Gopeng	Lee Boon Chye (PR–PKR)	29,696	55.7%	Ling Hee Leong (BN–MCA)	22,328	41.9%	7,368	Ting Chew Peh (BN–MCA)	74,344	43%	47%	10%				53,303	71.7%	1,279	2.4%
P072	Tapah	Saravanan Murugan (BN–MIC)	14,084	52.5%	Tan Seng Toh (PR–PKR)	11,064	41.3%	3,020	S Veerasingam (BN–MIC)	38,236	47%	32%	13%				26,811	70.1%	1,662	6.2%
P073	Pasir Salak	Tajuddin Abdul Rahman (BN–UMNO)	16,928	52.7%	Mustaffa Kamil Ayub (PR–PKR)	14,240	44.3%	2,688	Ramli Ngah Talib (BN–UMNO)	42,712	80%	15%	4%				32,119	75.2%	950	3.0%
P074	Lumut	Kong Cho Ha (BN–MCA)	25,698	45.9%	Suwardi Sapuan (PR–PKR)	25,400	45.4%	298	Kong Cho Ha (BN–MCA)	72,763	49%	39%	11%				55,930	76.9%	1,884	3.4%
P075	Bagan Datok	Ahmad Zahid Hamidi (BN–UMNO)	13,115	53.7%	Madzi Hasan (PR–PKR)	10,423	42.7%	2,692	Ahmad Zahid Hamidi (BN–UMNO)	34,670	57%	20%	23%				24,414	70.4%	814	3.3%
P076	Telok Intan	Manogaran Marimuthu (PR–DAP)	18,486	50.3%	Mah Siew Keong (BN–Gerakan)	17,016	46.3%	1,470	Mah Siew Keong (BN–Gerakan)	52,354	36%	45%	19%				36,739	70.2%	1,153	3.1%
P077	Tanjong Malim	Ong Ka Chuan (BN–MCA)	21,016	55.1%	Mohamad Azman Marjohan (PR–PKR)	15,594	40.9%	5,422	Loke Yuen Yow (BN–MCA)	53,481	51%	31%	15%				38,107	71.3%	1,344	3.5%

== Pahang ==
#	Constituency	Winner	Votes	Votes %	Opponent(s)	Votes	Votes %	Majority	Incumbent	Eligible voters	Malay voters	Chinese voters	Indian voters	Others voters	Muslim Bumiputera voters	Non-Muslim Bumiputera voters	Voter turnout	Voter turnout %	Spoilt votes	Spoilt votes %
P078	Cameron Highlands	Devamany S. Krishnasamy (BN–MIC)	9,164	55.7%	Apalasamy Jataliah (PR–DAP)	6,047	36.7%	3,117	Devamany S. Krishnasamy (BN–MIC)	23,461	43%	34%	14%				16,456	70.1%	1,186	7.2%
P079	Lipis	Mohamad Shahrum Osman (BN–UMNO)	12,611	58.0%	Mohamad Nilam Abdul Manap (PR–PAS)	8,474	38.9%	4,137	Mohamad Shahrum Osman (BN–UMNO)	28,425	74%	19%	6%				21,758	76.6%	561	2.6%
P080	Raub	Ng Yen Yen (BN–MCA)	18,078	52.5%	Abu Bakar Lebai Sudin (PR–DAP)	15,326	44.5%	2,752	Ng Yen Yen (BN–MCA)	46,454	49%	44%	6%				34,459	74.2%	915	2.7%
P081	Jerantut	Tengku Azlan Sultan Abu Bakar (BN–UMNO)	19,543	51.3%	Hamzah Jaafar (PR–PAS)	17,597	46.2%	1,946	Tengku Azlan Sultan Abu Bakar (BN–UMNO)	48,812	81%	15%	3%				38,078	78.0%	829	2.2%
P082	Indera Mahkota	Azan Ismail (PR–PKR)	19,823	50.0%	Salamon Ali Rizal Abd Rahman (BN–UMNO)	18,796	47.4%	1,027	Wan Adnan Wan Mamat (BN–UMNO)	51,235	65%	29%	6%				39,677	77.4%	668	1.7%
P083	Kuantan	Fuziah Salleh (PR–PKR)	18,398	51.4%	Fu Ah Kiow (BN–MCA)	16,572	46.3%	1,826	Fu Ah Kiow (BN–MCA)	47,745	60%	36%	4%				35,771	74.9%	623	1.7%
P084	Paya Besar	Abdul Manan Ismail (BN–UMNO)	19,355	62.7%	Mohd Jafri Ab Rashid (PR–PKR)	10,852	35.1%	8,503	Siti Zaharah Sulaiman (BN–UMNO)	39,882	80%	17%	2%				30,887	77.5%	637	2.1%
P085	Pekan	Najib Razak (BN–UMNO)	36,262	75.8%	Khairul Anuar Ahmad Zainudin (PR–PKR)	9,798	20.5%	26,464	Najib Razak (BN–UMNO)	58,217	93%	3%		3%			47,870	82.2%	1,261	2.6%
P086	Maran	Ismail Muttalib (BN–UMNO)	15,868	61.8%	Masrudin Tantawi (PR–PAS)	9,227	35.9%	6,641	Ismail Muttalib (BN–UMNO)	32,517	90%	8%		2%			25,672	79.0%	495	1.9%
P087	Kuala Krau	Ismail Mohamed Said (BN–UMNO)	16,165	58.6%	Kamal Shaari (PR–PAS)	10,900	39.5%	5,265	Ismail Mohamed Said (BN–UMNO)	34,139	91%	4%	3%				27,594	80.8%	479	1.7%
P088	Temerloh	Saifuddin Abdullah (BN–UMNO)	21,381	51.8%	Ahmad Nizam Hamid (PR–PKR)	18,940	45.9%	2,441	Mohd Sarit Yusoh (BN–UMNO)	54,010	63%	27%	9%				41,245	76.4%	924	2.2%
P089	Bentong	Liow Tiong Lai (BN–MCA)	25,134	64.2%	Ponusamy Govindasamy (PR–PKR)	12,585	32.1%	12,549	Liow Tiong Lai (BN–MCA)	53,651	43%	47%	9%				39,168	73.0%	1,285	3.3%
P090	Bera	Ismail Sabri Yaakob (BN–UMNO)	18,051	54.6%	Mazlan Aliman (PR–PAS)	14,230	43.0%	3,821	Ismail Sabri Yaakob (BN–UMNO)	42,993	61%	34%	4%				33,064	76.9%	783	2.4%
P091	Rompin	Jamaluddin Jarjis (BN–UMNO)	21,308	64.6%	Mazlan Mohd Yasin (PR–PAS)	10,629	32.2%	10,679	Jamaluddin Jarjis (BN–UMNO)	41,701	93%	3%		3%			32,960	79.0%	824	2.5%

== Selangor ==
#	Constituency	Winner	Votes	Votes %	Opponent(s)	Votes	Votes %	Majority	Incumbent	Eligible voters	Malay voters	Chinese voters	Indian voters	Others voters	Muslim Bumiputera voters	Non-Muslim Bumiputera voters	Voter turnout	Voter turnout %	Spoilt votes	Spoilt votes %
P092	Sabak Bernam	Abdul Rahman Bakri (BN–UMNO)	12,055	51.1%	Badrul Amin Bahron (PR–PKR)	10,720	45.5%	1,335	Mat Yasir Ikhsan (BN–UMNO)	31,381	81%	14%	5%				23,581	75.1%	711	3.0%
P093	Sungai Besar	Noriah Kasnon (BN–UMNO)	16,069	57.5%	Osman Sabran (PR–PAS)	11,060	39.6%	5,009	Noriah Kasnon (BN–UMNO)	34,073	68%	30%	2%				27,927	82.0%	656	2.4%
P094	Hulu Selangor	Zainal Abidin Ahmad (PR–PKR)	23,177	48.4%	Palanivel K. Govindasamy (BN–MIC)	22,979	48.0%	198	Palanivel K. Govindasamy (BN–MIC)	63,593	54%	27%	19%				47,845	75.2%	1,466	3.1%
P095	Tanjong Karang	Noh Omar (BN–UMNO)	16,073	55.3%	Mohamed Hanipa Maidin (PR–PAS)	12,253	42.2%	3,820	Noh Omar (BN–UMNO)	36,391	72%	17%	11%				29,052	79.8%	674	2.3%
P096	Kuala Selangor	Dzulkefly Ahmad (PR–PAS)	18,796	49.9%	Jahaya Ibrahim (BN–UMNO)	17,934	47.6%	862	Mohd Daud Taripeh (BN–UMNO)	47,203	61%	16%	23%				37,671	79.8%	894	2.4%
P097	Selayang	William Leong Jee Keen (PR–PKR)	30,701	50.4%	Lee Li Yew (BN–MCA)	27,134	44.5%	3,567	Chan Kong Choy (BN–MCA)	79,557	45%	36%	17%				60,920	76.6%	1,506	2.5%
P097	Selayang	William Leong Jee Keen (PR–PKR)	30,701	50.4%	Koh Swe Yong (PRM)	1,332	2.2%	3,567	Chan Kong Choy (BN–MCA)	79,557	45%	36%	17%				60,920	76.6%	1,506	2.5%
P098	Gombak	Mohamed Azmin Ali (PR–PKR)	40,334	53.3%	Said Anuar Said Ahmad (BN–UMNO)	33,467	44.3%	6,867	Rahman Ismail (BN–UMNO)	99,153	76%	13%	10%				75,619	76.3%	820	1.1%
P099	Ampang	Zuraida Kamarudin (PR–PKR)	26,995	52.8%	Azman Wahid (BN–UMNO)	23,319	45.6%	3,676	Rozaidah Talib (BN–UMNO)	69,132	56%	34%	9%				51,097	73.9%	636	1.2%
P100	Pandan	Ong Tee Keat (BN–MCA)	25,236	52.2%	Syed Shahir Syed Mohamud (PR–PKR)	22,275	46.1%	2,961	Ong Tee Keat (BN–MCA)	64,497	49%	45%	5%				48,309	74.9%	798	1.7%
P101	Hulu Langat	Che Rosli Che Mat (PR–PAS)	36,124	49.9%	Markiman Kobiran (BN–UMNO)	34,379	47.5%	1,745	Markiman Kobiran (BN–UMNO)	90,319	53%	36%	11%				72,322	80.0%	1,401	1.9%
P102	Serdang	Teo Nie Ching (PR–DAP)	47,444	62.2%	Hoh Hee Lee (BN–MCA)	26,419	34.7%	21,025	Yap Pian Hon (BN–MCA)	94,877	37%	52%	11%				76,236	80.4%	2,072	2.7%
P103	Puchong	Gobind Singh Deo (PR–DAP)	35,079	59.1%	Lau Yeng Peng (BN–Gerakan)	22,486	37.9%	12,593	Lau Yeng Peng (BN–Gerakan)	75,625	44%	41%	15%				59,317	78.4%	1,580	2.7%
P104	Kelana Jaya	Loh Gwo Burne (PR–PKR)	30,298	51.7%	Lee Hwa Beng (BN–MCA)	25,267	43.1%	5,031	Loh Seng Kok (BN–MCA)	79,648	42%	39%	18%				58,625	73.6%	1,065	1.8%
P104	Kelana Jaya	Loh Gwo Burne (PR–PKR)	30,298	51.7%	Billi Lim Peng Soon (IND)	1,895	3.2%	5,031	Loh Seng Kok (BN–MCA)	79,648	42%	39%	18%				58,625	73.6%	1,065	1.8%
P105	Petaling Jaya Selatan	Hee Loy Sian (PR–PKR)	28,598	54.3%	Donald Lim Siang Chai (BN–MCA)	22,892	43.5%	5,706	Donald Lim Siang Chai (BN–MCA)	73,192	40%	45%	15%				52,631	71.9%	1,044	2.0%
P106	Petaling Jaya Utara	Tony Pua Kiam Wee (PR–DAP)	37,851	67.2%	Chew Mei Fun (BN–MCA)	17,879	31.8%	19,972	Chew Mei Fun (BN–MCA)	76,618	15%	77%	6%				56,295	73.5%	527	0.9%
P107	Subang	Sivarasa K. Rasiah (PR–PKR)	35,024	53.2%	Murugesan Sinnandavar (BN–MIC)	28,315	43.0%	6,709	Karnail Singh Nijhar (BN–MIC)	84,414	50%	36%	14%				65,861	78.0%	2,079	3.2%
P108	Shah Alam	Khalid Samad (PR–PAS)	33,356	57.2%	Abdul Aziz Shamsuddin (BN–UMNO)	24,042	41.2%	9,314	Abdul Aziz Shamsuddin (BN–UMNO)	75,334	69%	16%	15%				58,361	77.5%	749	1.3%
P109	Kapar	Manikavasagam Sundram (PR–PKR)	48,196	55.0%	Komala Devi M. Perumal (BN–MIC)	35,899	41.0%	12,297	Komala Devi M. Perumal (BN–MIC)	112,224	51%	35%	13%				87,644	78.1%	3,064	3.5%
P110	Klang	Charles Anthony R. Santiago (PR–DAP)	37,990	64.0%	Ch'ng Toh Eng (BN–MCA)	20,289	34.2%	17,701	Tan Yee Kew (BN–MCA)	77,816	34%	47%	19%				59,323	76.2%	1,036	1.8%
P111	Kota Raja	Siti Mariah Mahmud (PR–PAS)	38,630	67.4%	Vigneswaran Sanasee (BN–MIC)	17,879	31.2%	20,751	Vigneswaran Sanasee (BN–MIC)	71,887	48%	23%	28%				57,323	79.7%	814	1.4%
P112	Kuala Langat	Abdullah Sani Abdul Hamid (PR–PKR)	26,687	50.6%	Sulaiman Mohd Karli (BN–UMNO)	25,698	48.7%	989	Shafie Salleh (BN–UMNO)	66,515	55%	26%	18%				52,792	79.4%	407	0.8%
P113	Sepang	Mohd Zin Mohamed (BN–UMNO)	26,381	53.7%	Mohamed Makki Ahmad (PR–PAS)	21,532	43.8%	4,849	Mohd Zin Mohamed (BN–UMNO)	62,044	59%	23%	18%				49,137	79.2%	1,099	2.2%

== Federal Territory of Kuala Lumpur ==
#	Constituency	Winner	Votes	Votes %	Opponent(s)	Votes	Votes %	Majority	Incumbent	Eligible voters	Malay voters	Chinese voters	Indian voters	Others voters	Muslim Bumiputera voters	Non-Muslim Bumiputera voters	Voter turnout	Voter turnout %	Spoilt votes	Spoilt votes %
P114	Kepong	Tan Seng Giaw (PR–DAP)	35,552	74.8%	Lau Hoi Keong (BN–Gerakan)	11,704	24.6%	23,848	Tan Seng Giaw (DAP)	60,775	4%	90%	5%				47,508	78.2%	212	0.5%
P115	Batu	Chua Tian Chang (PR–PKR)	29,785	58.1%	Lim Si Pin (BN–Gerakan)	20,330	39.6%	9,455	Ng Lip Yong (BN–Gerakan)	70,544	44%	41%	14%				51,303	72.7%	614	1.2%
P116	Wangsa Maju	Wee Choo Keong (PR–PKR)	19,637	49.3%	Yew Teong Look (BN–MCA)	19,487	49.0%	150	Yew Teong Look (BN–MCA)	54,509	52%	40%	7%				39,798	73.0%	357	0.9%
P117	Segambut	Lim Lip Eng (PR–DAP)	25,046	57.5%	Ma Woei Chyi (BN–Gerakan)	17,314	39.8%	7,732	Tan Kee Kwong (BN–Gerakan)	59,690	36%	52%	12%				43,531	72.9%	541	1.2%
P118	Setiawangsa	Zulhasnan Rafique (BN–UMNO)	25,489	56.5%	Ibrahim Yaacob (PR–PKR)	17,355	38.5%	8,134	Zulhasnan Rafique (BN–UMNO)	57,161	56%	33%	9%				45,096	78.9%	918	2.0%
P119	Titiwangsa	Lo' Lo' Mohd Ghazali (PR–PAS)	17,857	52.6%	Aziz Jamaluddin Mohd Tahir (BN–UMNO)	15,885	46.8%	1,972	Astaman Abdul Aziz (BN–UMNO)	49,892	67%	24%	9%				33,933	68.0%	191	0.6%
P120	Bukit Bintang	Fong Kui Lun (PR–DAP)	26,811	66.3%	Lee Chong Meng (BN–MCA)	12,534	31.0%	14,277	Fong Kui Lun (DAP)	59,986	15%	75%	10%				40,441	67.4%	466	1.2%
P121	Lembah Pantai	Nurul Izzah Anwar (PR–PKR)	21,728	52.6%	Shahrizat Abdul Jalil (BN–UMNO)	18,833	45.6%	2,895	Shahrizat Abdul Jalil (BN–UMNO)	56,650	55%	27%	18%				41,289	72.9%	239	0.6%
P121	Lembah Pantai	Nurul Izzah Anwar (PR–PKR)	21,728	52.6%	Periasamy Nagarathnam (IND)	489	1.2%	2,895	Shahrizat Abdul Jalil (BN–UMNO)	56,650	55%	27%	18%				41,289	72.9%	239	0.6%
P122	Seputeh	Teresa Kok Suh Sim (PR–DAP)	47,230	81.1%	Carol Chew Chee Lin (BN–MCA)	10,738	18.4%	36,492	Teresa Kok Suh Sim (DAP)	76,891	6%	87%	5%				58,207	75.7%	174	0.3%
P123	Cheras	Tan Kok Wai (PR–DAP)	39,253	77.6%	Jeffrey Goh Sim Ik (BN–MCA)	10,953	21.7%	28,300	Tan Kok Wai (DAP)	68,725	10%	84%	6%				50,571	73.6%	244	0.5%
P124	Bandar Tun Razak	Abdul Khalid Ibrahim (PR–PKR)	28,123	51.1%	Tan Chai Ho (BN–MCA)	25,608	46.6%	2,515	Tan Chai Ho (BN–MCA)	72,628	53%	40%	7%				54,995	75.7%	557	1.0%

== Federal Territory of Putrajaya ==
#	Constituency	Winner	Votes	Votes %	Opponent(s)	Votes	Votes %	Majority	Incumbent	Eligible voters	Malay voters	Chinese voters	Indian voters	Others voters	Muslim Bumiputera voters	Non-Muslim Bumiputera voters	Voter turnout	Voter turnout %	Spoilt votes	Spoilt votes %
P125	Putrajaya	Tengku Adnan Tengku Mansor (BN–UMNO)	4,038	74.6%	Mohamad Noor Mohamad (PR–PAS)	1,304	24.1%	2,734	Tengku Adnan Tengku Mansor (BN–UMNO)	6,608	95%		4%				5,416	82.0%	38	0.7%

== Negeri Sembilan ==
#	Constituency	Winner	Votes	Votes %	Opponent(s)	Votes	Votes %	Majority	Incumbent	Eligible voters	Malay voters	Chinese voters	Indian voters	Others voters	Muslim Bumiputera voters	Non-Muslim Bumiputera voters	Voter turnout	Voter turnout %	Spoilt votes	Spoilt votes %
P126	Jelebu	Rais Yatim (BN–UMNO)	19,737	68.0%	Norman Ipin (PR–PAS)	8,127	28.0%	11,610	Rais Yatim (BN–UMNO)	38,682	62%	28%	7%				29,029	75.1%	769	2.7%
P127	Jempol	Lilah Yasin (BN–UMNO)	25,294	64.3%	Siti Meriam Naan (PR–PAS)	12,974	33.0%	12,320	Mohamed Isa Abdul Samad (BN–UMNO)	53,478	58%	28%	14%				39,322	73.5%	1,054	2.7%
P128	Seremban	John Fernandez (PR–DAP)	32,970	51.2%	Yu Chok Tow (BN–MCA)	29,022	45.0%	3,948	Hon Choon Kim (BN–MCA)	84,675	42%	46%	12%				64,437	76.1%	2,248	3.5%
P129	Kuala Pilah	Hasan Malek (BN–UMNO)	20,417	64.3%	Annuar Mohd Salleh (PR–PKR)	10,409	32.8%	10,008	Hasan Malek (BN–UMNO)	42,328	77%	18%	5%				31,734	75.0%	908	2.9%
P130	Rasah	Loke Siew Fook (PR–DAP)	34,271	60.5%	Yeow Chai Thiam (BN–MCA)	21,120	37.3%	13,151	Goh Siow Huat (BN–MCA)	72,115	28%	52%	20%				56,654	78.6%	1,261	2.2%
P131	Rembau	Khairy Jamaluddin Abu Bakar (BN–UMNO)	26,525	54.2%	Badrul Hisham Shaharin (PR–PKR)	20,779	42.5%	5,746	Firdaus Muhammad Rom Harun (BN–UMNO)	62,896	69%	15%	16%				48,901	77.8%	1,086	2.2%
P132	Telok Kemang	Kamarul Bahrin Abbas (PR–PKR)	23,348	50.1%	Sothinathan Sinna Goundar (BN–MIC)	20,544	44.1%	2,804	Sothinathan Sinna Goundar (BN–MIC)	60,186	41%	36%	22%				46,613	77.5%	1,299	2.8%
P132	Telok Kemang	Kamarul Bahrin Abbas (PR–PKR)	23,348	50.1%	Mohd Rashid Arshad (IND)	601	1.3%	2,804	Sothinathan Sinna Goundar (BN–MIC)	60,186	41%	36%	22%				46,613	77.5%	1,299	2.8%
P133	Tampin	Shaziman Abu Mansor (BN–UMNO)	24,022	66.1%	Abdul Razakek Abdul Rahim (PR–PAS)	10,943	30.1%	13,079	Shaziman Abu Mansor (BN–UMNO)	47,655	61%	25%	13%				36,331	76.2%	1,115	3.1%

== Malacca ==
#	Constituency	Winner	Votes	Votes %	Opponent(s)	Votes	Votes %	Majority	Incumbent	Eligible voters	Malay voters	Chinese voters	Indian voters	Others voters	Muslim Bumiputera voters	Non-Muslim Bumiputera voters	Voter turnout	Voter turnout %	Spoilt votes	Spoilt votes %
P134	Masjid Tanah	Abu Seman Yusop (BN–UMNO)	21,582	68.0%	Ab. Ghani Ab. Rahman (PR–PAS)	9,297	29.3%	12,285	Abu Seman Yusop (BN–UMNO)	40,606	82%	14%	4%				31,715	78.1%	717	2.3%
P135	Alor Gajah	Fong Chan Onn (BN–MCA)	26,354	63.0%	Tan Lay Siang (PR–DAP)	13,470	32.2%	12,884	Fong Chan Onn (BN–MCA)	54,097	58%	30%	12%				41,854	77.4%	1,953	4.7%
P136	Tangga Batu	Idris Haron (BN–UMNO)	30,460	61.3%	Zainon Jaafar (PR–PKR)	15,960	32.1%	14,500	Idris Haron (BN–UMNO)	60,188	70%	25%	2%				49,675	82.5%	1,283	2.6%
P137	Bukit Katil	Md Sirat Abu (BN–UMNO)	30,975	49.9%	Khalid Jaafar (PR–PKR)	29,217	47.1%	1,758	Mohd Ruddin Abdul Ghani (BN–UMNO)	75,777	53%	41%	6%				62,073	81.9%	1,173	1.9%
P138	Kota Melaka	Sim Tong Him (PR–DAP)	38,640	57.3%	Wong Nai Chee (BN–MCA)	27,250	40.4%	11,390	Wong Nai Chee (BN–MCA)	84,805	33%	62%	3%				67,479	79.6%	1,448	2.2%
P139	Jasin	Ahmad Hamzah (BN–UMNO)	27,838	63.0%	Zulkefly Othman (PR–PKR)	15,348	34.7%	12,490	Mohammad Said Yusof (BN–UMNO)	56,121	71%	16%	3%				44,181	78.7%	990	2.2%

== Johor ==
#	Constituency	Winner	Votes	Votes %	Opponent(s)	Votes	Votes %	Majority	Incumbent	Eligible voters	Malay voters	Chinese voters	Indian voters	Others voters	Muslim Bumiputera voters	Non-Muslim Bumiputera voters	Voter turnout	Voter turnout %	Spoilt votes	Spoilt votes %
P140	Segamat	Subramaniam Sathasivam (BN–MIC)	15,921	53.6%	Pang Hok Liong (PR–DAP)	12,930	43.5%	2,991	Subramaniam Sathasivam (BN–MIC)	40,708	41%	48%	11%				29,699	73.0%	847	2.9%
P141	Sekijang	Baharum Mohamed (BN–UMNO)	17,979	67.3%	Zulkaply Salleh (PR–PKR)	8,112	30.4%	9,867	Baharum Mohamed (BN–UMNO)	35,138	55%	40%	5%				26,716	76.0%	622	2.3%
P142	Labis	Chua Tee Yong (BN–MCA)	13,658	56.7%	Teo Eng Ching (PR–DAP)	9,564	39.7%	4,094	Chua Soi Lek (BN–MCA)	33,468	37%	48%	15%				24,080	72.0%	816	3.4%
P143	Pagoh	Muhyiddin Yassin (BN–UMNO)	21,028	69.4%	Mohamad Rozali Jamil (PR–PAS)	8,447	27.9%	12,581	Muhyiddin Yassin (BN–UMNO)	40,042	63%	33%	4%				30,313	75.7%	786	2.6%
P144	Ledang	Hamim Samuri (BN–UMNO)	25,319	56.8%	Lee Fu Haw (PR–DAP)	17,702	39.7%	7,617	Hamim Samuri (BN–UMNO)	58,501	53%	43%	4%				44,556	76.2%	1,433	3.2%
P145	Bakri	Er Teck Hwa (PR–DAP)	21,051	48.8%	Tay Puay Chuan (BN–MCA)	20,329	47.1%	722	Chua Jui Meng (BN–MCA)	56,372	43%	54%	2%				43,155	76.6%	1,561	3.6%
P146	Muar	Razali Ibrahim (BN–UMNO)	16,986	56.1%	Nah Budin (PR–PKR)	12,325	40.7%	4,661	Razali Ibrahim (BN–UMNO)	41,019	62%	36%	2%				30,275	73.8%	902	3.0%
P147	Parit Sulong	Noraini Ahmad (BN–UMNO)	26,066	65.8%	Faisal Ali (PR–PAS)	12,467	31.5%	13,599	Syed Hood Syed Edros (BN–UMNO)	50,234	73%	26%					39,637	78.9%	1,033	2.6%
P148	Ayer Hitam	Wee Ka Siong (BN–MCA)	20,230	73.6%	Hussin Sujak (PR–PAS)	6,321	23.0%	13,909	Wee Ka Siong (BN–MCA)	34,805	57%	39%	4%				27,488	79.0%	907	3.3%
P149	Sri Gading	Mohamad Aziz (BN–UMNO)	19,641	67.1%	Ali Markom (PR–PKR)	8,767	30.0%	10,874	Mohamad Aziz (BN–UMNO)	36,845	65%	33%					29,266	79.4%	738	2.5%
P150	Batu Pahat	Mohd Puad Zarkashi (BN–UMNO)	32,593	60.2%	Muhammad Abdullah (PR–PKR)	19,625	36.3%	12,968	Junaidy Abd Wahab (BN–UMNO)	70,069	53%	46%					54,103	77.2%	1,768	3.3%
P151	Simpang Renggam	Liang Teck Meng (BN–Gerakan)	16,450	63.3%	Atan Gombang (PR–PAS)	8,597	33.1%	7,853	Kerk Choo Ting (BN–Gerakan)	34,859	54%	36%	10%				25,998	74.6%	924	3.6%
P152	Kluang	Hou Kok Chung (BN–MCA)	27,970	51.3%	Ng Lam Hua (PR–DAP)	24,189	44.3%	3,781	Hoo Seong Chang (BN–MCA)	71,233	38%	52%	9%				54,567	76.6%	1,884	3.5%
P153	Sembrong	Hishammuddin Hussein (BN–UMNO)	17,988	71.3%	Lee Sang (PR–PKR)	6,418	25.5%	11,570	Hishammuddin Hussein (BN–UMNO)	33,181	54%	36%	10%				25,211	76.0%	739	2.9%
P154	Mersing	Abdul Latiff Ahmad (BN–UMNO)	20,116	73.0%	Shahar Abdullah (PR–PAS)	6,380	23.2%	13,736	Abdul Latiff Ahmad (BN–UMNO)	36,445	79%	19%					27,548	75.6%	857	3.1%
P155	Tenggara	Halimah Mohamed Sadique (BN–UMNO)	19,031	75.1%	Salleh Farmin (PR–PAS)	4,982	19.7%	14,049	Adham Baba (BN–UMNO)	32,297	75%	18%	7%				25,349	78.5%	1,336	5.3%
P156	Kota Tinggi	Syed Hamid Albar (BN–UMNO)	22,682	83.7%	Onn Jaafar (PR–PAS)	3,721	13.7%	18,961	Syed Hamid Albar (BN–UMNO)	34,190	84%	13%	2%				27,109	79.3%	653	2.4%
P157	Pengerang	Azalina Othman Said (BN–UMNO)	0		Unopposed	0		0	Azalina Othman Said (BN–UMNO)	33,002	87%	12%								
P158	Tebrau	Teng Boon Soon (BN–MCA)	30,860	63.5%	Roslaini Sarif (PR–PAS)	16,202	33.3%	14,658	Teng Boon Soon (BN–MCA)	62,505	49%	37%	13%				48,587	77.7%	1,525	3.1%
P159	Pasir Gudang	Mohamed Khaled Nordin (BN–UMNO)	35,849	64.1%	Md Rizan Mohd Saman (PR–PKR)	18,568	33.2%	17,281	Mohamed Khaled Nordin (BN–UMNO)	72,862	48%	40%	11%				55,891	76.7%	1,211	2.2%
P160	Johor Bahru	Shahrir Abdul Samad (BN–UMNO)	43,143	69.1%	Hassan Abdul Karim (PRM)	17,794	28.5%	25,349	Shahrir Abdul Samad (BN–UMNO)	89,725	51%	44%	5%				62,440	69.6%	1,391	2.2%
P161	Pulai	Nur Jazlan Mohamed (BN–UMNO)	38,036	66.9%	Abdullah Ideris (PR–PAS)	17,587	30.9%	20,449	Nur Jazlan Mohamed (BN–UMNO)	79,622	51%	40%	9%				56,863	71.4%	1,079	1.9%
P162	Gelang Patah	Tan Ah Eng (BN–MCA)	33,630	55.4%	Zaliha Mustafa (PR–PKR)	24,779	40.8%	8,851	Tan Ah Eng (BN–MCA)	78,676	34%	54%	12%				60,728	77.2%	2,244	3.7%
P163	Kulai	Ong Ka Ting (BN–MCA)	32,017	59.6%	Ng Pak Siong (PR–DAP)	20,273	37.8%	11,744	Lim Si Cheng (BN–MCA)	67,358	32%	59%	9%				53,676	79.7%	1,327	2.5%
P164	Pontian	Ahmad Maslan (BN–UMNO)	23,121	70.5%	Mohd Annuar Mohd Salleh (PR–PKR)	8,677	26.4%	14,444	Hasni Mohamad (BN–UMNO)	43,264	68%	31%					32,806	75.8%	1,008	3.1%
P165	Tanjong Piai	Wee Jeck Seng (BN–MCA)	23,302	65.5%	Ahmad Ton (PR–DAP)	10,931	30.7%	12,371	Ong Ka Ting (BN–MCA)	45,701	50%	49%					35,564	77.8%	1,117	3.1%

== Federal Territory of Labuan ==
#	Constituency	Winner	Votes	Votes %	Opponent(s)	Votes	Votes %	Majority	Incumbent	Eligible voters	Malay voters	Chinese voters	Indian voters	Others voters	Muslim Bumiputera voters	Non-Muslim Bumiputera voters	Voter turnout	Voter turnout %	Spoilt votes	Spoilt votes %
P166	Labuan	Yussof Mahal (BN–UMNO)	10,471	74.0%	Lau Seng Kiat (IND)	2,014	14.2%	8,457	Suhaili Abdul Rahman (BN–UMNO)	20,783	37%	25%		36%			14,149	68.1%	311	2.2%
P166	Labuan	Yussof Mahal (BN–UMNO)	10,471	74.0%	Matusin Abdul Rahman (PR–PAS)	1,106	7.8%	8,457	Suhaili Abdul Rahman (BN–UMNO)	20,783	37%	25%		36%			14,149	68.1%	311	2.2%

== Sabah ==
#	Constituency	Winner	Votes	Votes %	Opponent(s)	Votes	Votes %	Majority	Incumbent	Eligible voters	Malay voters	Chinese voters	Indian voters	Others voters	Muslim Bumiputera voters	Non-Muslim Bumiputera voters	Voter turnout	Voter turnout %	Spoilt votes	Spoilt votes %
P167	Kudat	Abdul Rahim Bakri (BN–UMNO)	17,634	66.4%	Yahya Othman (PR–PKR)	7,739	29.1%	9,895	Abdul Rahim Bakri (BN–UMNO)	39,643		15%			54%	31%	26,551	67.0%	1,058	4.0%
P168	Kota Marudu	Maximus Johnity Ongkili (BN–PBS)	12,028	54.2%	Anthony Mandiau (PR–PKR)	7,830	35.3%	4,198	Maximus Johnity Ongkili (BN–PBS)	31,938		3%			27%	70%	22,199	69.5%	748	3.4%
P168	Kota Marudu	Maximus Johnity Ongkili (BN–PBS)	12,028	54.2%	Roslan Mohd Zain (IND)	1,109	5.0%	4,198	Maximus Johnity Ongkili (BN–PBS)	31,938		3%			27%	70%	22,199	69.5%	748	3.4%
P168	Kota Marudu	Maximus Johnity Ongkili (BN–PBS)	12,028	54.2%	Bernam Angkap (BERSEKUTU)	457	2.1%	4,198	Maximus Johnity Ongkili (BN–PBS)	31,938		3%			27%	70%	22,199	69.5%	748	3.4%
P169	Kota Belud	Abdul Rahman Dahlan (BN–UMNO)	17,842	53.0%	Saidil Simoi (PR–PKR)	14,822	44.0%	3,020	Salleh Said Keruak (BN–UMNO)	43,071		2%			59%	39%	33,710	78.3%	1,046	3.1%
P170	Tuaran	Wilfred Bumburing (BN–UPKO)	17,645	57.7%	Ansari Abdullah (PR–PKR)	11,023	36.1%	6,622	Wilfred Madius Tangau (BN–UPKO)	40,761		8%			44%	49%	30,563	75.0%	979	3.2%
P170	Tuaran	Wilfred Bumburing (BN–UPKO)	17,645	57.7%	Nazin Gagah (IND)	879	2.9%	6,622	Wilfred Madius Tangau (BN–UPKO)	40,761		8%			44%	49%	30,563	75.0%	979	3.2%
P171	Sepanggar	Eric Majimbun (BN–SAPP)	16,884	62.6%	Mohamad Ibrahim @ Paul Kuleling (PR–PKR)	5,423	20.1%	11,461	Eric Majimbun (BN–SAPP)	39,251		22%			49%	29%	26,990	68.8%	790	2.9%
P171	Sepanggar	Eric Majimbun (BN–SAPP)	16,884	62.6%	Ewol Munji (PR–DAP)	3,709	13.7%	11,461	Eric Majimbun (BN–SAPP)	39,251		22%			49%	29%	26,990	68.8%	790	2.9%
P172	Kota Kinabalu	Hiew King Chew (PR–DAP)	9,464	33.8%	Christina Liew Chin Jin (PR–PKR)	9,358	33.4%	106	Yee Moh Chai (BN–PBS)	43,714		78%			12%	9%	28,017	64.1%	326	1.2%
P172	Kota Kinabalu	Hiew King Chew (PR–DAP)	9,464	33.8%	Chin Teck Ming (BN–PBS)	8,420	30.1%	106	Yee Moh Chai (BN–PBS)	43,714		78%			12%	9%	28,017	64.1%	326	1.2%
P172	Kota Kinabalu	Hiew King Chew (PR–DAP)	9,464	33.8%	Kong Yu Kiong (IND)	341	1.2%	106	Yee Moh Chai (BN–PBS)	43,714		78%			12%	9%	28,017	64.1%	326	1.2%
P173	Putatan	Marcus Mojigoh (BN–UPKO)	13,737	59.0%	Saukinah Yussof (PR–PKR)	7,292	31.3%	6,445	Marcus Mojigoh (BN–UPKO)	34,935		24%			63%	13%	23,296	66.7%	608	2.7%
P173	Putatan	Marcus Mojigoh (BN–UPKO)	13,737	59.0%	Ramzah Ahmad (IND)	918	3.9%	6,445	Marcus Mojigoh (BN–UPKO)	34,935		24%			63%	13%	23,296	66.7%	608	2.7%
P174	Penampang	Bernard Giluk Dompok (BN–UPKO)	13,400	52.4%	Edwin Bosi (PR–PKR)	10,337	40.5%	3,063	Donald Peter Mojuntin (BN–UPKO)	35,821		33%			11%	55%	25,552	71.3%	540	2.1%
P174	Penampang	Bernard Giluk Dompok (BN–UPKO)	13,400	52.4%	Anthony Tibok (IND)	696	2.7%	3,063	Donald Peter Mojuntin (BN–UPKO)	35,821		33%			11%	55%	25,552	71.3%	540	2.1%
P174	Penampang	Bernard Giluk Dompok (BN–UPKO)	13,400	52.4%	Livired Missih @ Willybroad Missi (PASOK)	404	1.6%	3,063	Donald Peter Mojuntin (BN–UPKO)	35,821		33%			11%	55%	25,552	71.3%	540	2.1%
P175	Papar	Rosnah Abdul Rashid Shirlin (BN–UMNO)	15,352	61.6%	Wahap Idris (PR–PKR)	5,778	23.2%	9,574	Rosnah Abdul Rashid Shirlin (BN–UMNO)	32,279		12%			63%	25%	24,913	77.2%	651	2.6%
P175	Papar	Rosnah Abdul Rashid Shirlin (BN–UMNO)	15,352	61.6%	Patrick Sindu (IND)	2,268	9.1%	9,574	Rosnah Abdul Rashid Shirlin (BN–UMNO)	32,279		12%			63%	25%	24,913	77.2%	651	2.6%
P175	Papar	Rosnah Abdul Rashid Shirlin (BN–UMNO)	15,352	61.6%	Mohd Hashim Yussup (IND)	429	1.7%	9,574	Rosnah Abdul Rashid Shirlin (BN–UMNO)	32,279		12%			63%	25%	24,913	77.2%	651	2.6%
P176	Kimanis	Anifah Aman (BN–UMNO)	10,242	59.0%	Jaafar Ismail (IND)	4,789	27.6%	5,453	Anifah Aman (BN–UMNO)	22,239		7%			68%	25%	17,367	78.1%	500	2.9%
P176	Kimanis	Anifah Aman (BN–UMNO)	10,242	59.0%	Ismail Bungsu (PR–PKR)	1,615	9.3%	5,453	Anifah Aman (BN–UMNO)	22,239		7%			68%	25%	17,367	78.1%	500	2.9%
P176	Kimanis	Anifah Aman (BN–UMNO)	10,242	59.0%	Benjamin Basintal (IND)	205	1.2%	5,453	Anifah Aman (BN–UMNO)	22,239		7%			68%	25%	17,367	78.1%	500	2.9%
P177	Beaufort	Lajim Ukin (BN–UMNO)	14,780	76.4%	Lajim Md Yusof (PR–PKR)	3,866	20.0%	10,914	Azizah Mohd Dun (BN–UMNO)	26,788		12%			63%	26%	19,346	72.2%	681	3.5%
P178	Sipitang	Sapawi Ahmad (BN–UMNO)	11,905	65.4%	Karim Tassim (PR–PKR)	5,759	31.6%	6,146	Yusof Yacob (BN–UMNO)	24,145		5%			81%	14%	18,211	75.4%	531	2.9%
P179	Ranau	Siringan Gubat (BN–UPKO)	14,074	63.4%	Jonathan Yasin (PR–PKR)	6,823	30.7%	7,251	Bernard Giluk Dompok (BN–UPKO)	30,810		3%			39%	58%	22,201	72.1%	653	2.9%
P179	Ranau	Siringan Gubat (BN–UPKO)	14,074	63.4%	Vitos Mark Koding (PASOK)	619	2.8%	7,251	Bernard Giluk Dompok (BN–UPKO)	30,810		3%			39%	58%	22,201	72.1%	653	2.9%
P180	Keningau	Joseph Pairin Kitingan (BN–PBS)	14,598	56.2%	Geoffrey Gapari Kitingan (PR–PKR)	10,334	39.8%	4,264	Joseph Pairin Kitingan (BN–PBS)	35,578		11%			24%	65%	25,956	73.0%	464	1.8%
P180	Keningau	Joseph Pairin Kitingan (BN–PBS)	14,598	56.2%	Peter Kodou (PR–DAP)	560	2.2%	4,264	Joseph Pairin Kitingan (BN–PBS)	35,578		11%			24%	65%	25,956	73.0%	464	1.8%
P181	Tenom	Raime Unggi (BN–UMNO)	9,535	60.7%	Adris Taripin (PR–PKR)	2,652	16.9%	6,883	Raime Unggi (BN–UMNO)	20,874		17%			25%	57%	15,705	75.2%	523	3.3%
P181	Tenom	Raime Unggi (BN–UMNO)	9,535	60.7%	Joh Jimmy @ Richard Joe Jimmy (IND)	2,499	15.9%	6,883	Raime Unggi (BN–UMNO)	20,874		17%			25%	57%	15,705	75.2%	523	3.3%
P181	Tenom	Raime Unggi (BN–UMNO)	9,535	60.7%	Mutang @ Sylvester Dawat (BERSEKUTU)	485	3.1%	6,883	Raime Unggi (BN–UMNO)	20,874		17%			25%	57%	15,705	75.2%	523	3.3%
P182	Pensiangan	Joseph Kurup (BN–PBRS)	0		Unopposed	0		0	Bernard S. Maraat (BN–PBRS)	19,712		2%			12%	85%				
P183	Beluran	Ronald Kiandee (BN–UMNO)	7,090	57.4%	Ramsah Tashim (IND)	2,738	22.2%	4,352	Ronald Kiandee (BN–UMNO)	19,181		2%			61%	37%	12,349	64.4%	468	3.8%
P183	Beluran	Ronald Kiandee (BN–UMNO)	7,090	57.4%	Michael @ Radio Luban (PR–PKR)	1,271	10.3%	4,352	Ronald Kiandee (BN–UMNO)	19,181		2%			61%	37%	12,349	64.4%	468	3.8%
P183	Beluran	Ronald Kiandee (BN–UMNO)	7,090	57.4%	Petrus Rining (IND)	571	4.6%	4,352	Ronald Kiandee (BN–UMNO)	19,181		2%			61%	37%	12,349	64.4%	468	3.8%
P183	Beluran	Ronald Kiandee (BN–UMNO)	7,090	57.4%	Nordin Kaning (IND)	175	1.4%	4,352	Ronald Kiandee (BN–UMNO)	19,181		2%			61%	37%	12,349	64.4%	468	3.8%
P184	Libaran	Juslie Ajirol (BN–UMNO)	13,668	66.6%	Ahmad Thamrin Jaini (PR–PKR)	6,139	29.9%	7,529	Juslie Ajirol (BN–UMNO)	31,435		23%			72%	5%	20,536	65.3%	613	3.0%
P185	Batu Sapi	Edmund Chong Ket Wah (BN–PBS)	9,479	57.8%	Chong Kwong Wing (IND)	5,771	35.2%	3,708	Edmund Chong Ket Wah (BN–PBS)	26,004		37%			60%	2%	16,398	63.1%	730	4.5%
P186	Sandakan	Liew Vui Keong (BN–LDP)	8,297	41.4%	Chong Chu Lin (PR–DAP)	8,121	40.5%	176	Chong Hon Min (IND)	32,847		61%			35%	4%	20,048	61.0%	644	3.2%
P186	Sandakan	Liew Vui Keong (BN–LDP)	8,297	41.4%	Fong Vun Fui (IND)	2,929	14.6%	176	Chong Hon Min (IND)	32,847		61%			35%	4%	20,048	61.0%	644	3.2%
P187	Kinabatangan	Bung Moktar Radin (BN–UMNO)	8,507	66.4%	Ahmad Abdul (PR–PKR)	2,181	17.0%	6,326	Bung Moktar Radin (BN–UMNO)	19,554					92%	6%	12,814	65.5%	589	4.6%
P187	Kinabatangan	Bung Moktar Radin (BN–UMNO)	8,507	66.4%	Dasim @ Ricky Jikah (IND)	1,515	11.8%	6,326	Bung Moktar Radin (BN–UMNO)	19,554					92%	6%	12,814	65.5%	589	4.6%
P188	Silam	Salleh Kalbi (BN–UMNO)	18,111	65.7%	Hashbullah Imam Ohang (PR–PKR)	8,319	30.2%	9,792	Samsu Baharom Abdul Rahman (BN–UMNO)	43,488		14%			72%	12%	27,557	63.4%	989	3.6%
P189	Semporna	Mohd Shafie Apdal (BN–UMNO)	19,419	87.4%	Abdul Azis Abdul Hamid (PR–PKR)	1,957	8.8%	17,462	Mohd Shafie Apdal (BN–UMNO)	35,216		3%			93%	5%	22,209	63.1%	832	3.8%
P190	Tawau	Chua Soon Bui (BN–SAPP)	13,943	51.5%	Chan Foong Hin (PR–DAP)	9,076	33.5%	4,867	Shim Paw Fatt (BN–SAPP)	42,560		44%			51%	4%	27,071	63.6%	735	2.7%
P190	Tawau	Chua Soon Bui (BN–SAPP)	13,943	51.5%	Berhan @ Birhan Ruslan (PR–PKR)	3,278	12.1%	4,867	Shim Paw Fatt (BN–SAPP)	42,560		44%			51%	4%	27,071	63.6%	735	2.7%
P191	Kalabakan	Abdul Ghapur Salleh (BN–UMNO)	0		Unopposed	0		0	Abdul Ghapur Salleh (BN–UMNO)	36,018		13%			78%	8%				

== Sarawak ==
#	Constituency	Winner	Votes	Votes %	Opponent(s)	Votes	Votes %	Majority	Incumbent	Eligible voters	Malay voters	Chinese voters	Indian voters	Others voters	Muslim Bumiputera voters	Non-Muslim Bumiputera voters	Voter turnout	Voter turnout %	Spoilt votes	Spoilt votes %
P192	Mas Gading	Tiki Lafe (BN–SPDP)	8,551	57.8%	Patau Rubis (SNAP)	4,250	28.7%	4,301	Tiki Lafe (BN–SPDP)	21,968		19%			13%	68%	14,800	67.4%	188	1.3%
P192	Mas Gading	Tiki Lafe (BN–SPDP)	8,551	57.8%	Fabian Tisen (IND)	1,476	10.0%	4,301	Tiki Lafe (BN–SPDP)	21,968		19%			13%	68%	14,800	67.4%	188	1.3%
P192	Mas Gading	Tiki Lafe (BN–SPDP)	8,551	57.8%	Apin Baeng (IND)	306	2.1%	4,301	Tiki Lafe (BN–SPDP)	21,968		19%			13%	68%	14,800	67.4%	188	1.3%
P193	Santubong	Wan Junaidi Tuanku Jaafar (BN–PBB)	15,800	79.2%	Rahamat Idil Latip (PR–PKR)	3,855	19.3%	11,945	Wan Junaidi Tuanku Jaafar (BN–PBB)	30,836		8%			83%	9%	19,959	64.7%	248	1.2%
P194	Petra Jaya	Fadillah Yusof (BN–PBB)	19,515	78.0%	Mohamad Jolhi (PR–PKR)	5,118	20.4%	14,397	Fadillah Yusof (BN–PBB)	40,533		12%			79%	8%	25,027	61.7%	263	1.1%
P195	Bandar Kuching	Chong Chieng Jen (PR–DAP)	22,901	63.2%	Sim Yaw Yen (BN–SUPP)	12,949	35.7%	9,952	Chong Chieng Jen (DAP)	53,216		91%			5%	3%	36,257	68.1%	242	0.7%
P196	Stampin	Yong Khoon Seng (BN–SUPP)	21,966	50.0%	Voon Lee Shan (PR–DAP)	18,896	43.0%	3,070	Yong Khoon Seng (BN–SUPP)	67,257		73%			13%	13%	43,922	65.3%	428	1.0%
P196	Stampin	Yong Khoon Seng (BN–SUPP)	21,966	50.0%	See Chee How (PR–PKR)	2,198	5.0%	3,070	Yong Khoon Seng (BN–SUPP)	67,257		73%			13%	13%	43,922	65.3%	428	1.0%
P197	Kota Samarahan	Sulaiman Abdul Rahman Taib (BN–PBB)	15,559	72.6%	Hussain Apok (PR–PKR)	4,148	19.4%	11,411	Abdul Taib Mahmud (BN–PBB)	28,517		12%			65%	22%	21,428	75.1%	449	2.1%
P197	Kota Samarahan	Sulaiman Abdul Rahman Taib (BN–PBB)	15,559	72.6%	Abu Bakar Awang Dawos (IND)	898	4.2%	11,411	Abdul Taib Mahmud (BN–PBB)	28,517		12%			65%	22%	21,428	75.1%	449	2.1%
P198	Mambong	James Dawos Mamit (BN–PBB)	14,182	63.6%	Majen Panyog (PR–PKR)	7,525	33.7%	6,657	James Dawos Mamit (BN–PBB)	36,147		27%			12%	61%	22,306	61.7%	473	2.1%
P199	Serian	Richard Riot Jaem (BN–SUPP)	15,793	85.3%	Sylvester Belayong Jayang (SNAP)	2,366	12.8%	13,427	Richard Riot Jaem (BN–SUPP)	27,901		11%			15%	75%	18,516	66.4%	332	1.8%
P200	Batang Sadong	Nancy Shukri (BN–PBB)	8,183	73.6%	Piee Ling (PR–PKR)	2,758	24.8%	5,425	Adenan Satem (BN–PBB)	16,794		6%			74%	21%	11,120	66.2%	170	1.5%
P201	Batang Lupar	Rohani Abdul Karim (BN–PBB)	11,015	76.5%	Abang Zulkifli Abang Engkeh (PR–PKR)	2,923	20.3%	8,092	Rohani Abdul Karim (BN–PBB)	22,417		3%			77%	20%	14,393	64.2%	193	1.3%
P201	Batang Lupar	Rohani Abdul Karim (BN–PBB)	11,015	76.5%	Ali Semsu (IND)	250	1.7%	8,092	Rohani Abdul Karim (BN–PBB)	22,417		3%			77%	20%	14,393	64.2%	193	1.3%
P202	Sri Aman	Masir Kujat (BN–PRS)	9,700	62.5%	Cobbold Lusoi (IND)	5,448	35.1%	4,252	Jimmy Donald (BN–PBDS)	25,724		17%			20%	63%	15,513	60.3%	211	1.4%
P203	Lubok Antu	William Nyallau Badak (BN–PRS)	6,769	56.3%	Nicholas Bawin (IND)	5,159	42.95	1,610	Jawah Gerang (BN–PBDS)	17,190		8%			18%	74%	12,028	70.0%	99	0.8%
P204	Betong	Douglas Uggah Embas (BN–PBB)	13,708	85.9%	Edmond Stanley Jugol (SNAP)	1,999	12.5%	11,709	Douglas Uggah Embas (BN–PBB)	22,088		7%			50%	43%	15,953	72.2%	246	1.5%
P205	Saratok	Jelaing Mersat (BN–SPDP)	12,470	75.7%	Mohd Yahya Abdullah (PR–PKR)	3,764	22.9%	8,706	Jelaing Mersat (BN–SPDP)	23,982		7%			44%	49%	16,467	68.7%	218	1.3%
P206	Tanjong Manis	Norah Abdul Rahman (BN–PBB)	0		Unopposed	0		0	New constituency	17,052		5%			74%	20%				
P207	Igan	Wahab Dolah (BN–PBB)	0		Unopposed	0		0	New constituency	15,735		4%			81%	15%				
P208	Sarikei	Ding Kuong Hiing (BN–SUPP)	10,588	47.6%	Wong Hua Seh (PR–DAP)	10,537	47.4%	51	Law Hieng Ding (BN–SUPP)	31,675		66%			11%	23%	22,246	70.2%	176	0.8%
P208	Sarikei	Ding Kuong Hiing (BN–SUPP)	10,588	47.6%	Kung Chin Chin (IND)	545	2.4%	51	Law Hieng Ding (BN–SUPP)	31,675		66%			11%	23%	22,246	70.2%	176	0.8%
P208	Sarikei	Ding Kuong Hiing (BN–SUPP)	10,588	47.6%	Lau Kain Chai (IND)	116	0.5%	51	Law Hieng Ding (BN–SUPP)	31,675		66%			11%	23%	22,246	70.2%	176	0.8%
P208	Sarikei	Ding Kuong Hiing (BN–SUPP)	10,588	47.6%	Ngu Tieng Hai (IND)	105	0.5%	51	Law Hieng Ding (BN–SUPP)	31,675		66%			11%	23%	22,246	70.2%	176	0.8%
P209	Julau	Joseph Salang Gandum (BN–PRS)	10,351	77.8%	Ambrose Labang Jamba (PR–PKR)	2,767	20.8%	7,584	Joseph Salang Gandum (BN–PBDS)	20,306		5%			12%	83%	13,313	65.6%	182	1.4%
P210	Kanowit	Aaron Ago Dagang (BN–PRS)	0		Unopposed	0		0	Aaron Ago Dagang (BN–PBDS)	17,613		12%			16%	72%				
P211	Lanang	Tiong Thai King (BN–SUPP)	19,476	56.5%	Wong Kee Woan (PR–DAP)	14,612	42.4%	4,864	Tiong Thai King (BN–SUPP)	49,530		72%			10%	18%	34,443	69.5%	253	0.7%
P212	Sibu	Robert Lau Hoi Chew (BN–SUPP)	19,138	52.6%	Wong Ho Leng (PR–DAP)	15,903	43.7%	3,235	Robert Lau Hoi Chew (BN–SUPP)	53,679		65%			20%	15%	36,379	67.8%	334	0.9%
P212	Sibu	Robert Lau Hoi Chew (BN–SUPP)	19,138	52.6%	Lim Chin Chuang (PR–PKR)	812	2.2%	3,235	Robert Lau Hoi Chew (BN–SUPP)	53,679		65%			20%	15%	36,379	67.8%	334	0.9%
P213	Mukah	Leo Michael Toyad (BN–PBB)	10,090	69.9%	Hai Merawin (IND)	3,792	26.3%	6,298	Leo Michael Toyad (BN–PBB)	22,851		10%			75%	16%	14,435	63.2%	521	3.6%
P214	Selangau	Joseph Entulu Belaun (BN–PRS)	0		Unopposed	0		0	Joseph Entulu Belaun (BN–PBDS)	20,057		4%			13%	83%				
P215	Kapit	Alexander Nanta Linggi (BN–PBB)	0		Unopposed	0		0	Alexander Nanta Linggi (BN–PBB)	22,723		10%			22%	68%				
P216	Hulu Rajang	Billy Abit Joo (BN–PRS)	6,590	59.0%	George Lagong (IND)	4,426	39.6%	2,164	Billy Abit Joo (BN–PBDS)	17,696				2%	20%	77%	11,164	63.1%	139	1.3%
P217	Bintulu	Tiong King Sing (BN–SPDP)	23,628	72.4%	Lim Su Kien (PR–DAP)	8,663	26.6%	14,965	Tiong King Sing (BN–SPDP)	50,404		28%			29%	44%	32,629	64.7%	288	0.9%
P218	Sibuti	Ahmad Lai Bujang (BN–PBB)	8,238	63.2%	Michael Teo Yu Keng (PR–PKR)	4,590	35.2%	3,648	New constituency	22,143		22%			33%	44%	13,030	58.8%	192	1.5%
P219	Miri	Peter Chin Fah Kui (BN–SUPP)	19,354	57.0%	Fong Pau Teck (PR–DAP)	14,138	41.6%	5,216	Peter Chin Fah Kui (BN–SUPP)	55,963		57%			26%	17%	33,969	60.7%	273	0.8%
P220	Baram	Jacob Dungau Sagan (BN–SPDP)	7,996	65.9%	Kebing Wan (SNAP)	3,952	32.6%	4,044	Jacob Dungau Sagan (BN–SPDP)	24,425		9%			21%	70%	12,126	49.7%	167	1.4%
P221	Limbang	Hasbi Habibollah (BN–PBB)	6,427	51.9%	Lau Liat Koi (PR–PKR)	5,751	46.5%	676	New constituency	20,315		19%			45%	35%	12,380	60.9%	113	0.9%
P222	Lawas	Henry Sum Agong (BN–PBB)	0		Unopposed	0		0	New constituency	15,717		10%			43%	47%				
