= Norah Abdul Rahman =

Malaysian politician

Yang Berbahagia Datuk Norah Abdul Rahman PJN
- نورة عبدالرحمٰن

Member of the Malaysian Parliament for Tanjong Manis
- In office 8 March 2008 – 9 May 2018
- Preceded by: Constituency established
- Succeeded by: Yusuf Abd Wahab (BN–PBB)
- Majority: Unopposed (2008); 10,964 (2013)

Personal details
- Born: 4 October 1958 (age 67) Crown Colony of Sarawak
- Citizenship: Malaysia
- Party: Parti Pesaka Bumiputera Bersatu (PBB)
- Relations: Abdul Aziz Isa Marindo (Nephew)
- Parent(s): Abdul Rahman Ya'kub (died 2015)
- Occupation: Retired politician

Norah binti Abdul Rahman (born 4 October 1958) is a retired Malaysian politician. She was the Member of Parliament (MP) for the Tanjong Manis constituency in Sarawak from 2008 until 2018, representing the Parti Pesaka Bumiputera Bersatu (PBB), a component party of the Gabungan Parti Sarawak (GPS) and formerly Barisan Nasional (BN) coalitions.

Norah is the daughter of former Yang di-Pertua Negeri (Governor) and Chief Minister of Sarawak, Abdul Rahman Ya'kub. Before entering politics, she was a businesswoman. She was elected to Parliament unopposed in the 2008 election, replacing Wahab Dolah as the PBB's nominee for the Tanjong Manis seat. She was re-elected in 2013, winning almost 90% of votes cast to defeat a Malaysian Islamic Party (PAS) candidate. She did not re-contest the seat in the 2018 election.

== Election results ==
Parliament of Malaysia
Year	Constituency	Candidate	Votes	Pct	Opponent(s)	Votes	Pct	Ballots cast	Majority	Turnout
2008	P206 Tanjong Manis	Norah Abdul Rahman (PBB)	Unopposed							
2013	P206 Tanjong Manis	Norah Abdul Rahman (PBB)	12,535	88.86%	Jurina Mut (PAS)	1,571	11.14%	14,402	10,964	74.95%

== Honours ==
- Malaysia
  - Commander of the Order of Meritorious Service (PJN) – Datuk (2009)
