= Shadow Cabinet of Hamzah Zainudin =

List of Malaysian MPs who shadow ministries

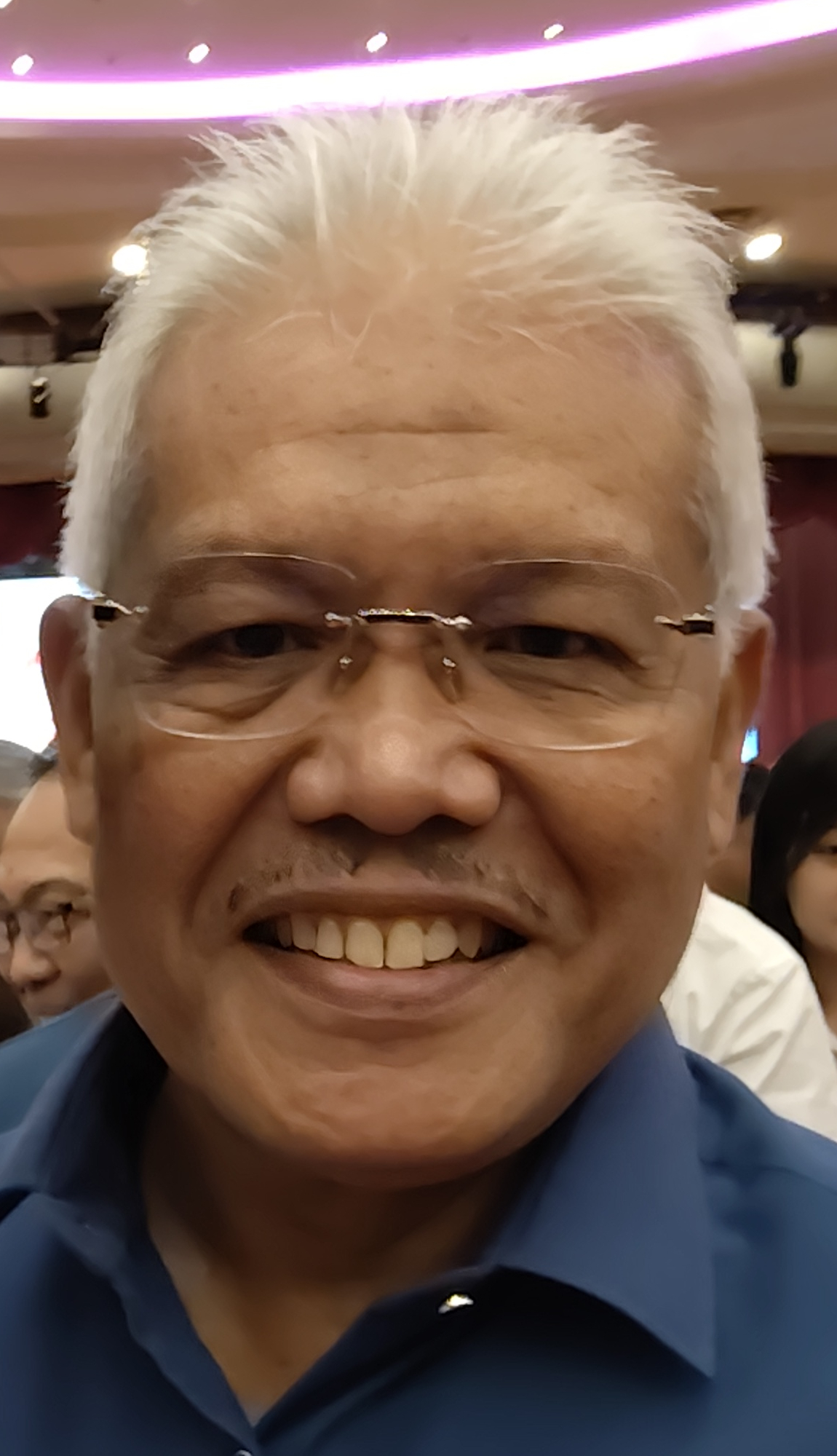
Hamzah Zainudin, Leader of the Opposition

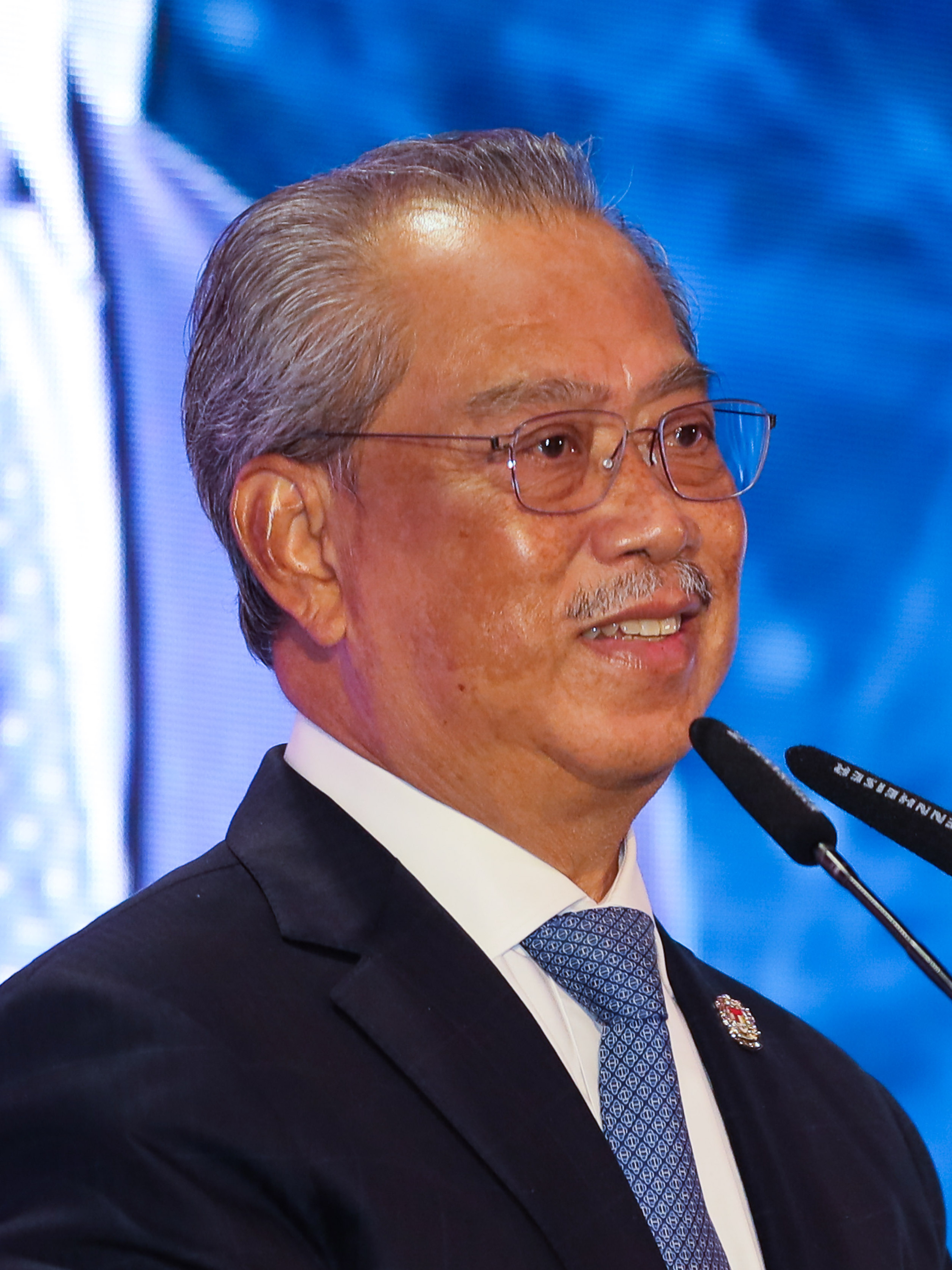
Muhyiddin Yassin, Leader of Perikatan Nasional

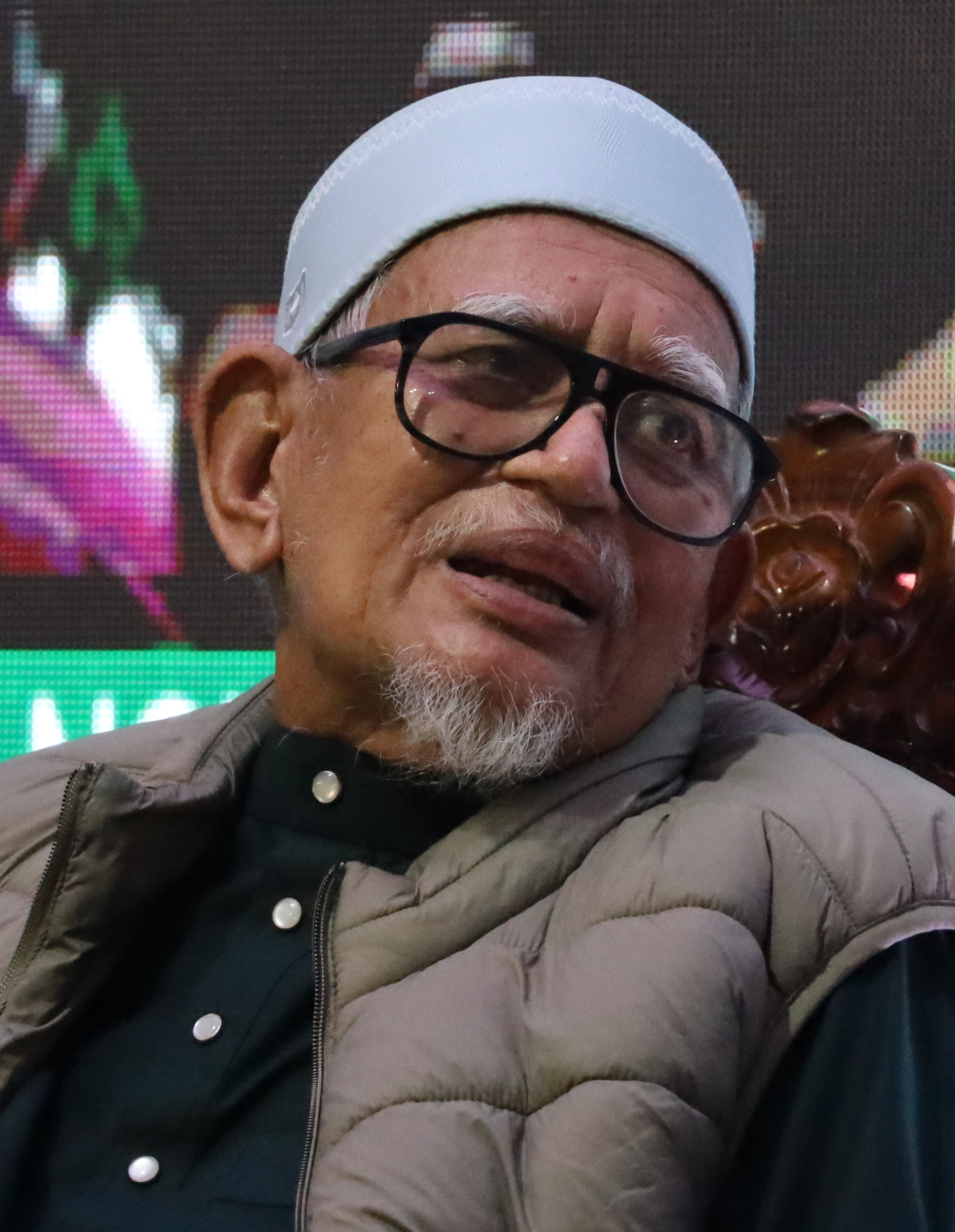
Abdul Hadi Awang, Deputy Leader of Perikatan Nasional

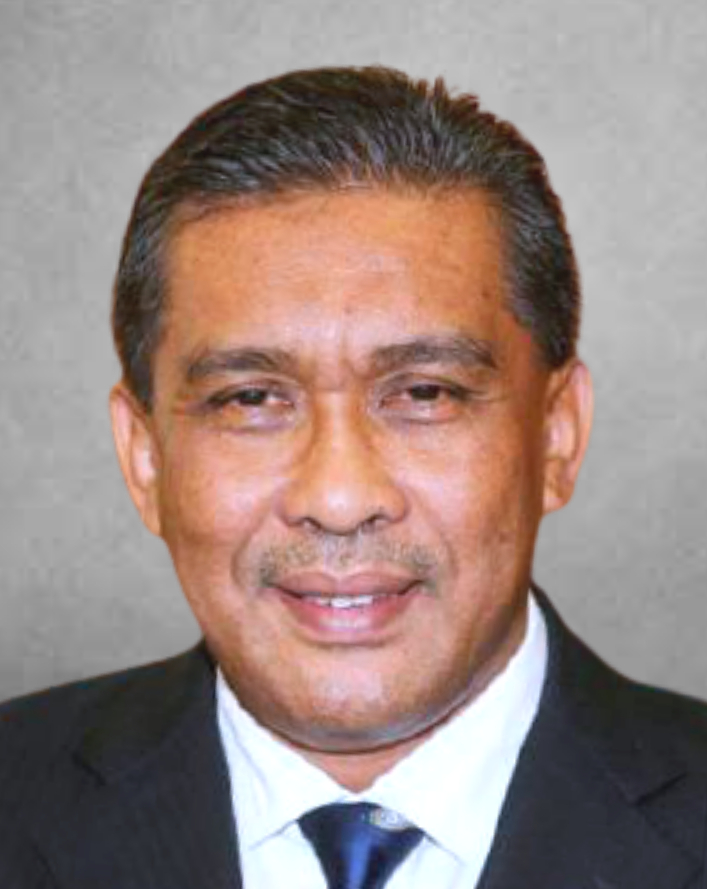
Takiyuddin Hassan, Chief Whip of Perikatan Nasional and Shadow Minister of Home Affairs

On 2 February 2023, Leader of the Opposition Hamzah Zainudin unveiled his shadow cabinet of the Members of Parliament (MPs) of Perikatan Nasional (PN). However, Hamzah later clarified that list is a 'portfolio committee' instead of a shadow cabinet.

The committee or shadow cabinet was criticised for its lack of inclusivity as the list is dominated by a single race.

However, on 8 February 2024, Hamzah announced to do some cabinet reshuffle and add on a few portfolio, including economy, digital, energy transition and water transformation, higher education and federal territories.

== Composition ==
Pan-Malaysian Islamic Party (18)	Malaysian United Indigenous Party (16)

Portfolio	Leader	Party	Constituency
Leader of Perikatan Nasional	Tan Sri Muhyiddin Yassin MP	BERSATU	Pagoh
Deputy Leader of Perikatan Nasional	Tan Sri Abdul Hadi Awang MP	PAS	Marang
Leader of the Opposition	Dato' Seri Hamzah Zainudin MP	BERSATU	Larut
Chief Whip of Perikatan Nasional and Shadow Minister of Home Affairs	Datuk Seri Takiyuddin Hassan MP	PAS	Kota Bharu
Shadow Minister in the Prime Minister's Department	Datuk Haji Idris Ahmad MP (Religious Affairs)	PAS	Bagan Serai
Shadow Minister in the Prime Minister's Department	Datuk Ali Biju MP (Sabah and Sarawak Affairs)	BERSATU	Saratok
Shadow Minister in the Prime Minister's Department	Datuk Che Mohamad Zulkifly Jusoh MP (Law and Institutional Reform)	PAS	Besut
Shadow Minister in the Prime Minister's Department	Dato' Azman Nasrudin MP (Federal Territories)	BERSATU	Padang Serai
Shadow Minister of Natural Resources and Environmental Sustainability	Dato' Sri Tuan Ibrahim Tuan Man MP MLA	PAS	Kubang Kerian
Shadow Minister of Agriculture and Food Security	Datuk Seri Ronald Kiandee MP	BERSATU	Beluran
Shadow Minister of Finance	Datuk Dr. Mohd Radzi Md Jidin MP	BERSATU	Putrajaya
Shadow Minister of Higher Education	Dato' Sri Ahmad Samsuri Mokhtar MP MLA	PAS	Kemaman
Shadow Minister of Education	Dato' Sri Saifuddin Abdullah MP	BERSATU	Indera Mahkota
Shadow Minister of Rural and Regional Development	Dato' Seri Shahidan Kassim MP	PAS	Arau
Shadow Minister of Foreign Affairs	Wan Ahmad Fayhsal Wan Ahmad Kamal MP	BERSATU	Machang
Shadow Minister of Youth and Sports	Afnan Hamimi Taib Azamudden MP	PAS	Alor Setar
Shadow Minister of Tourism, Arts and Culture	Datuk Wira Mas Ermieyati Samsudin MP	BERSATU	Masjid Tanah
Shadow Minister of Economy	Mohd Syahir Che Sulaiman MP	PAS	Bachok
Shadow Minister of Domestic Trade and Cost of Living	Datuk Rosol Wahid MP	BERSATU	Hulu Terengganu
Shadow Minister of Entrepreneur Development and Cooperatives	Datuk Haji Muslimin Yahaya MP	BERSATU	Sungai Besar
Shadow Minister of Women, Family and Community Development	Dato' Siti Zailah Mohd Yusoff MP	PAS	Rantau Panjang
Shadow Minister of Housing and Local Government	Dato' Sri Dr. Haji Ismail Abdul Muttalib MP	PAS	Maran
Shadow Minister of Works	Dato' Mohd Suhaimi Abdullah MP	BERSATU	Langkawi
Shadow Minister of Defence	Dato' Sri Ikmal Hisham Abdul Aziz MP	BERSATU	Tanah Merah
Shadow Minister of Human Resources	Datuk Haji Awang Hashim MP	PAS	Pendang
Shadow Minister of Science, Technology and Innovation	Datuk Haji Ahmad Amzad Mohd Hashim MP	PAS	Kuala Terengganu
Shadow Minister of Communications	Datuk Wan Saiful Wan Jan MP	BERSATU	Tasek Gelugor
Shadow Minister of National Unity	Dr. Halimah Ali MP	PAS	Kapar
Shadow Minister of Plantation and Commodities	Bakri Jamaluddin MP	PAS	Tangga Batu
Shadow Minister of Digital	Ahmad Fadhli Shaari MP	PAS	Pasir Mas
Shadow Minister of Investment, Trade and Industry	Dato' Wira Ku Abdul Rahman Ku Ismail MP	BERSATU	Kubang Pasu
Shadow Minister of Health	Dato' Dr Ahmad Yunus Hairi MP MLA	PAS	Kuala Langat
Shadow Minister of Energy Transition and Water Transformation	Datuk Abdul Khalib Abdullah MP	BERSATU	Rompin
Shadow Minister of Transport	Ir. Ts. Khairil Nizam Khirudin MP	PAS	Jerantut

== Shadow Cabinet shuffles ==
Colour key
- Joined the Cabinet
- Portfolio created, split or renamed

Shadow Minister	Position before reshuffle	Result of reshuffle
8 February 2024
Mohd Radzi Md Jidin	Shadow Minister of Finance and Economy	Shadow Minister of Finance
Abdul Khalib Abdullah	Backbench MP	Shadow Minister of Energy Transition and Water Transformation
Che Mohamad Zulkifly Jusoh	Shadow Minister of Works	Shadow Minister in the Prime Minister's Department (Law and Institutional Reform)
Ali Biju	Shadow Minister in the Prime Minister's Department (Sabah, Sarawak Affairs and Special Functions)	Shadow Minister in the Prime Minister's Department (Sabah and Sarawak Affairs)
Azman Nasrudin	Shadow Minister of Plantation and Commodities	Shadow Minister in the Prime Minister's Department (Federal Territories)
Mohd Syahir Che Sulaiman	Backbench MP	Shadow Minister of Economy
Mohd Suhaimi Abdullah	Shadow Minister of Tourism, Arts and Culture	Shadow Minister of Works
Tuan Ibrahim Tuan Man	Shadow Natural Resources, Environment and Climate Change	Shadow Minister of Natural Resources and Environmental Sustainability
Ahmad Samsuri Mokhtar	Backbench MP	Shadow Minister of Higher Education
Mas Ermieyati Samsudin	Shadow Minister in the Prime Minister's Department (Law and Institutional Reform)	Shadow Minister of Tourism, Arts and Culture
Wan Saiful Wan Jan	Shadow Minister of Communications and Digital	Shadow Minister of Communications
Saifuddin Abdullah	Shadow Minister of Education and Higher Education	Shadow Minister of Education
Afnan Hamimi Taib Azamudden	Backbench MP	Shadow Minister of Youth and Sports
Bakri Jamaluddin	Backbench MP	Shadow Minister of Plantation and Commodities
Ahmad Fadhli Shaari	Shadow Minister of Youth and Sports	Shadow Minister of Digital

== See also ==
- Opposition (Malaysia)
- Shadow Cabinet of Malaysia
- Shadow Cabinet of Anwar Ibrahim
- Shadow Cabinet of Ahmad Zahid Hamidi
- DAP Spokesperson of the 13th Parliament
