= Shadow Cabinet of Malaysia =

Part of the government structure of Malaysia

Like several other countries utilizing the parliamentary system, Malaysia employs the use of shadow cabinets to hold the government to account, and to serve as a potential alternate government-in-waiting. However, the shadow cabinet is not officially recognised by the government.

== Hamzah Shadow Cabinet (2022–present) ==
On 2 February 2023, Leader of the Opposition Hamzah Zainudin unveiled his shadow cabinet of the Members of Parliament (MPs) of Perikatan Nasional (PN). However, Hamzah later clarified that list is a 'portfolio committee' instead of a shadow cabinet.

The committee or shadow cabinet was criticised for its lack of inclusivity as the list is dominated by a single race.

=== Composition ===
==== 2024–present ====
PAS (18)	BERSATU (16)

Portfolio	Leader	Party	Constituency
Leader of Perikatan Nasional	Tan Sri Muhyiddin Yassin MP	BERSATU	Pagoh
Deputy Leader of Perikatan Nasional	Tan Sri Abdul Hadi Awang MP	PAS	Marang
Leader of the Opposition	Dato' Seri Hamzah Zainudin MP	BERSATU	Larut
Chief Whip of Perikatan Nasional; Shadow Minister of Home Affairs	Datuk Seri Takiyuddin Hassan MP	PAS	Kota Bharu
Shadow Minister of Finance	Datuk Dr. Mohd Radzi Md Jidin MP	BERSATU	Putrajaya
Shadow Minister of Rural and Regional Development	Dato' Seri Shahidan Kassim MP	PAS	Arau
Shadow Minister of Energy Transition and Water Transformation	Datuk Abdul Khalib Abdullah MP	BERSATU	Rompin
Shadow Minister in the Prime Minister's Department	Datuk Che Mohamad Zulkifly Jusoh MP (Law and Institutional Reform)	PAS	Besut
Shadow Minister in the Prime Minister's Department	Datuk Haji Idris Ahmad MP (Religious Affairs)	PAS	Bagan Serai
Shadow Minister in the Prime Minister's Department	Datuk Ali Biju MP (Sabah and Sarawak Affairs)	BERSATU	Saratok
Shadow Minister in the Prime Minister's Department	Dato' Azman Nasrudin MP (Federal Territories)	BERSATU	Padang Serai
Shadow Minister of Transport	Ir. Ts. Khairil Nizam Khirudin MP	PAS	Jerantut
Shadow Minister of Agriculture and Food Security	Datuk Seri Ronald Kiandee MP	BERSATU	Beluran
Shadow Minister of Economy	Mohd Syahir Che Sulaiman MP	PAS	Bachok
Shadow Minister of Housing and Local Government	Dato' Sri Dr. Haji Ismail Abdul Muttalib MP	PAS	Maran
Shadow Minister of Foreign Affairs	Wan Ahmad Fayhsal Wan Ahmad Kamal MP	BERSATU	Machang
Shadow Minister of Works	Dato' Mohd Suhaimi Abdullah MP	BERSATU	Langkawi
Shadow Minister of International Trade and Industry	Dato' Wira Ku Abdul Rahman Ku Ismail MP	BERSATU	Kubang Pasu
Shadow Minister of Defence	Dato' Sri Ikmal Hisham Abdul Aziz MP	BERSATU	Tanah Merah
Shadow Minister of Science, Technology and Innovation	Datuk Haji Ahmad Amzad Mohd Hashim MP	PAS	Kuala Terengganu
Shadow Minister of Women, Family and Community Development	Dato' Siti Zailah Mohd Yusoff MP	PAS	Rantau Panjang
Shadow Minister of Natural Resources and Environmental Sustainability	Dato' Sri Tuan Ibrahim Tuan Man MP MLA	PAS	Kubang Kerian
Shadow Minister of Entrepreneur Development and Cooperatives	Datuk Haji Muslimin Yahaya MP	BERSATU	Sungai Besar
Shadow Minister of Higher Education	Dato' Sri Ahmad Samsuri Mokhtar MP MLA	PAS	Kemaman
Shadow Minister of Tourism, Arts and Culture	Datuk Wira Mas Ermieyati Samsudin MP	BERSATU	Masjid Tanah
Shadow Minister of Communications	Datuk Wan Saiful Wan Jan MP	BERSATU	Tasek Gelugor
Shadow Minister of Education	Dato' Sri Saifuddin Abdullah MP	BERSATU	Indera Mahkota
Shadow Minister of National Unity	Dr. Halimah Ali MP	PAS	Kapar
Shadow Minister of Youth and Sports	Afnan Hamimi Taib Azamudden MP	PAS	Alor Setar
Shadow Minister of Domestic Trade and Cost of Living	Datuk Rosol Wahid MP	BERSATU	Hulu Terengganu
Shadow Minister of Plantation and Commodities	Bakri Jamaluddin MP	PAS	Tangga Batu
Shadow Minister of Health	Dato' Dr Ahmad Yunus Hairi MP MLA	PAS	Kuala Langat
Shadow Minister of Digital	Ahmad Fadhli Shaari MP	PAS	Pasir Mas
Shadow Minister of Human Resources	Datuk Haji Awang Hashim MP	PAS	Pendang

==== 2022–2024 ====
Portfolio	Leader	Party	Constituency	Deputy Leader	Party	Constituency
Leader of Perikatan Nasional	Tan Sri Muhyiddin Yassin MP	BERSATU	Pagoh	Tan Sri Abdul Hadi Awang MP	PAS	Marang
Leader of the Opposition	Dato' Seri Hamzah Zainudin MP	BERSATU	Larut			
Chief Whip and Shadow Minister of Home Affairs	Datuk Seri Takiyuddin Hassan MP	PAS	Kota Bharu			
Shadow Minister in the Prime Minister's Department	Datuk Haji Idris Ahmad MP (Religious Affairs)	PAS	Bagan Serai			
Shadow Minister in the Prime Minister's Department	Datuk Wira Mas Ermieyati Samsudin MP (Law and Institutional Reform)	BERSATU	Masjid Tanah			
Shadow Minister in the Prime Minister's Department	Datuk Ali Biju MP (Sabah, Sarawak Affairs and Special Functions)	BERSATU	Saratok			
Shadow Minister of Natural Resources, Environment and Climate Change	Dato' Sri Tuan Ibrahim Tuan Man MP MLA	PAS	Kubang Kerian			
Shadow Minister of Agriculture and Food Security	Datuk Seri Ronald Kiandee MP	BERSATU	Beluran			
Shadow Minister of Finance and Shadow Minister of Economy	Datuk Dr. Mohd Radzi Md Jidin MP	BERSATU	Putrajaya			
Shadow Minister of Education and Shadow Minister of Higher Education	Dato' Sri Saifuddin Abdullah MP	BERSATU	Indera Mahkota			
Shadow Minister of Rural and Regional Development	Dato' Seri Shahidan Kassim MP	PAS	Arau			
Shadow Minister of Youth and Sports	Ahmad Fadhli Shaari MP	PAS	Pasir Mas			
Shadow Minister of Foreign Affairs	Wan Ahmad Fayhsal Wan Ahmad Kamal MP	BERSATU	Machang			
Shadow Minister of Domestic Trade and Cost of Living	Datuk Rosol Wahid MP	BERSATU	Hulu Terengganu			
Shadow Minister of Entrepreneur Development and Cooperatives	Datuk Haji Muslimin Yahaya MP	BERSATU	Sungai Besar			
Shadow Minister of Women, Family and Community Development	Dato' Siti Zailah Mohd Yusoff MP	PAS	Rantau Panjang			
Shadow Minister of Local Government Development	Dato' Sri Dr. Haji Ismail Abdul Muttalib MP	PAS	Maran			
Shadow Minister of Tourism, Arts and Culture	Dato' Mohd Suhaimi Abdullah MP	BERSATU	Langkawi			
Shadow Minister of Defence	Dato' Sri Ikmal Hisham Abdul Aziz MP	BERSATU	Tanah Merah			
Shadow Minister of Human Resources	Datuk Haji Awang Hashim MP	PAS	Pendang			
Shadow Minister of Science, Technology and Innovation	Datuk Haji Ahmad Amzad Mohd Hashim MP	PAS	Kuala Terengganu			
Shadow Minister of Communications and Digital	Datuk Wan Saiful Wan Jan MP	BERSATU	Tasek Gelugor			
Shadow Minister of Works	Datuk Che Mohamad Zulkifly Jusoh MP	PAS	Besut			
Shadow Minister of National Unity	Dr. Halimah Ali MP	PAS	Kapar			
Shadow Minister of International Trade and Industry	Dato' Wira Ku Abdul Rahman Ku Ismail MP	BERSATU	Kubang Pasu			
Shadow Minister of Health	Dato' Dr Ahmad Yunus Hairi MP MLA	PAS	Kuala Langat			
Shadow Minister of Plantation and Commodities	Dato' Azman Nasrudin MP	BERSATU	Padang Serai			

== See also ==
- Opposition (Malaysia)
- Frontbench Committees of Anwar Ibrahim
- DAP Spokesperson of the 13th Parliament
