= Shadow Cabinet of Anwar Ibrahim =

List of Malaysian MPs who shadow ministries

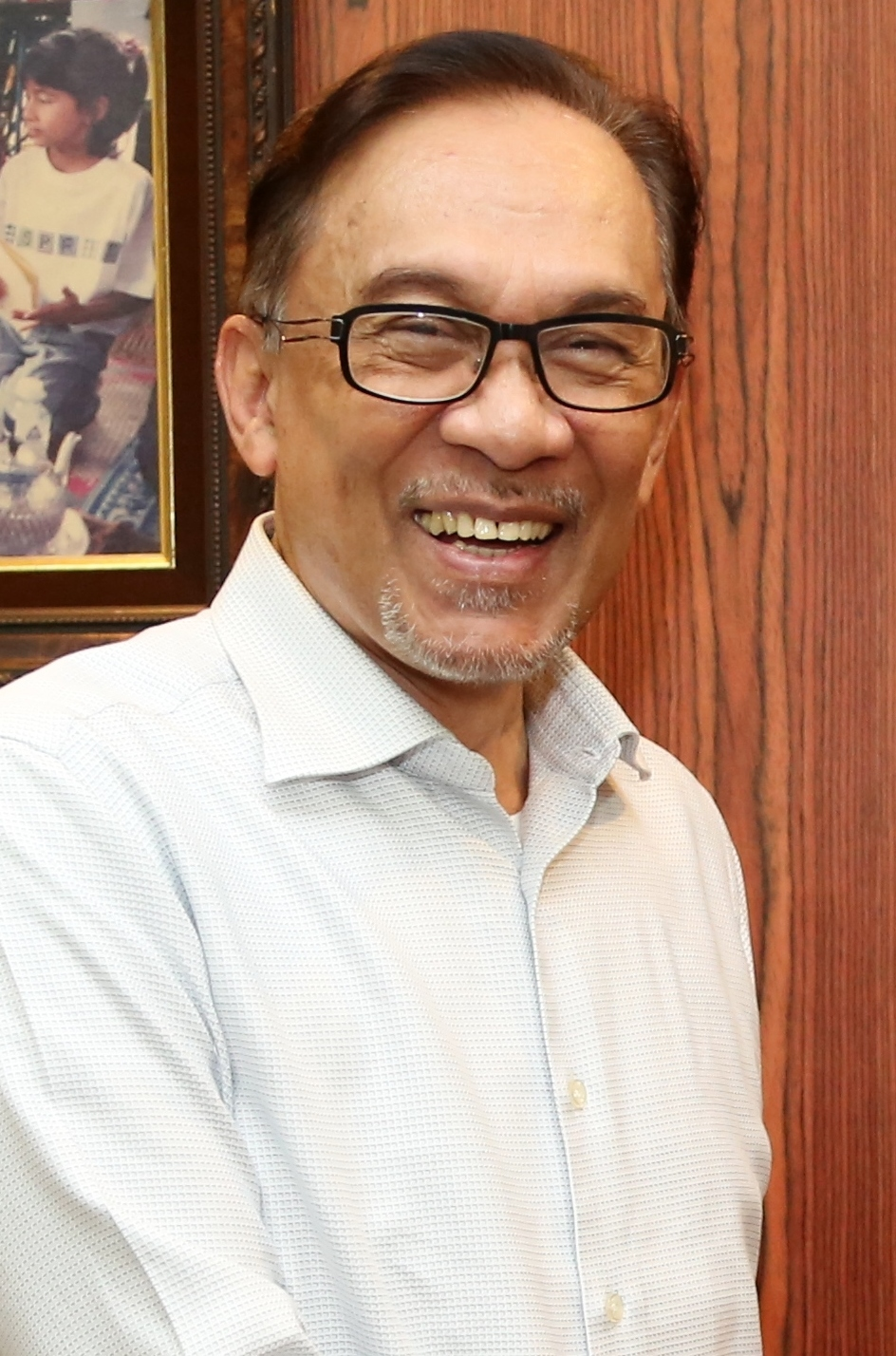
Anwar Ibrahim, Leader of the Opposition

On 9 May 2021, the Pakatan Harapan secretariat has announced the members of nine committees to address issues of the day, given the Perikatan Nasional government's "incompetency" and "inability to lead the country". The committees are Education, Health, Economy, Security, Gender, Youth, Cost-of-Living, Legal, Mobilisation, Plantation and Food Industry, and Communication, Digital and Multimedia. With the Education and Health committee led by Simpang Renggam MP Maszlee Malik and Kuala Selangor MP Dzulkefly Ahmad, respectively. On 24 November 2022, the shadow cabinet was dissolved following the appointment of Anwar as the 10th Prime Minister and the return of PH to the federal government.

== Education Committee ==
- Dr Maszlee Malik (Chairman), Simpang Renggam MP
- Nik Nazmi Nik Ahmad, Setiawangsa MP
- Teo Nie Ching, Kulai MP
- Datuk Dr Hasan Bahrom, Tampin MP
- Natrah Ismail, Sekijang MP
- Steven Sim Chee Keong, Bukit Mertajam MP
- Rusnah Aluai, Tangga Batu MP

== Health Committee ==
- Datuk Seri Dr Dzulkefly Ahmad (Chairman), Kuala Selangor MP
- Dr Lee Boon Chye, Gopeng MP
- Dr Kelvin Yii Lee Wuen, Bandar Kuching MP
- Datuk Hatta Ramli, Lumut MP
- Sim Tze Tzin, Bayan Baru MP
- Dr Ong Kian Ming, Bangi MP
- Alice Lau Kiong Yieng, Lanang MP
- Dr Siti Mariah Mahmud, Seri Serdang MLA
- Dr Norlela Ariffin, Penanti MLA
- Veerapan Superamaniam, Repah MLA
- Niekmah Adam
- Zaliha Mustafa

== Economy Committee ==
- Wong Chen, Subang MP
- Tony Pua, Damansara MP
- Datuk Seri Dr Dzulkefly Ahmad, Kuala Selangor MP
- Datin Paduka Tan Yee Kew, Wangsa Maju MP
- Noor Amin Ahmad, Kangar MP
- Ammar Atan
- Raja Iskandar Fareez
- Syeikh Khuzaifah
- E Hun Tan

== Security Committee ==
- Mohamad Sabu, Kota Raja MP
- Datuk Johari Abdul, Sungai Petani MP and Gurun MLA
- Syed Ibrahim Syed Noh, Ledang MP
- Muhammad Faiz Fadzil, Permatang Pasir MLA
- Liew Chin Tong, Perling MLA
- Syahredzan Johan

== Gender Committee ==
- Fuziah Salleh, Kuantan MP
- Chong Eng, Padang Lalang MLA
- Raj Munni Sabu

== Youth Committee ==
- Akmal Nasir, Johor Bahru MP
- Howard Lee Chuan How, Pasir Pinji MLA
- Hasbie Muda

== Cost-of-Living Committee ==
- Hassan Abdul Karim, Pasir Gudang MP
- Datuk Hasanuddin Mohd Yunus, Hulu Langat MP
- Chong Chieng Jen, Stampin MP
- Natrah Ismail, Sekijang MP
- V Sivakumar, Batu Gajah MP
- Chan Foong Hin, Kota Kinabalu MP
- Cha Kee Chin, Rasah MP
- Nor Hayati Bachok
- Asmirul Anuar Aris, Kubang Rotan MLA

== Legal Committee ==
- Mohamed Hanipa Maidin, Sepang MP
- William Leong, Selayang MP
- Ramkarpal Singh, Bukit Gelugor MP
- Sivarasa Rasiah, Sungai Buloh MP
- Muhammad Faiz Fadzil, Permatang Pasir MLA
- Fadhlina Sidek, Senator
- Zulqarnain Lukman

== Mobilisation Committee ==
- Mohamad Sabu, Kota Raja MP
- Datuk Seri Shamsul Iskandar Md. Akin, Hang Tuah Jaya MP
- Steven Sim Chee Keong, Bukit Mertajam MP

== Plantation and Food Industry Committee ==
- Datuk Seri Salahuddin Ayub, Pulai MP
- V Sivakumar, Batu Gajah MP
- S Kesavan, Sungai Siput MP
- Sim Tze Tzin, Bayan Baru MP

== Communication, Digital and Multimedia Committee ==
- Ahmad Fahmi Fadzil, Lembah Pantai MP
- Khalid Samad, Shah Alam MP
- Hannah Yeoh, Segambut MP
- Wong Shu Qi, Kluang MP
- Chan Ming Kai, Alor Setar MP
- Loh Ker Chen
- Soraya Salim

== Religion Committee ==
- Datuk Seri Mujahid Yusof Rawa, Parit Buntar MP
- Fuziah Salleh, Kuantan MP
- Tengku Zulpuri Shah Tengku Puji, Raub MP
- Raj Munni Sabu
- Norashidah Jaafar

== See also ==
- Opposition (Malaysia)
- Shadow Cabinet of Hamzah Zainudin
- Shadow Cabinet of Ahmad Zahid Hamidi
- DAP Spokesperson of the 13th Parliament
