= Shadow Cabinet of Ahmad Zahid Hamidi =

List of Malaysian MPs who shadow ministries

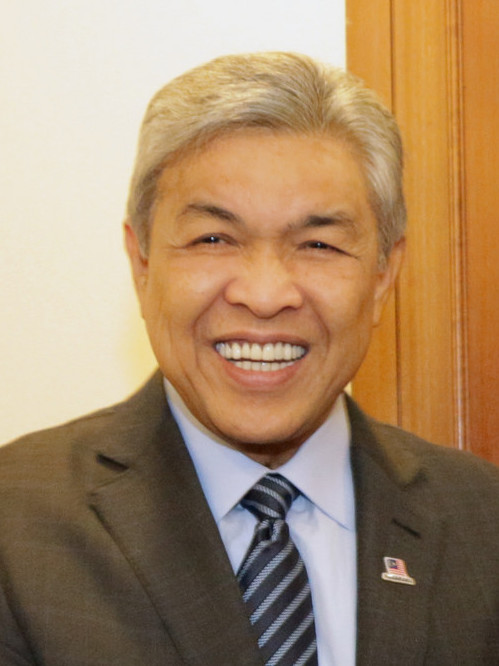
Ahmad Zahid Hamidi, Leader of the Opposition

The Shadow Cabinet of Ahmad Zahid Hamidi was established on 26 September 2018. The purpose of this Shadow Cabinet is to provide a check and balance role for Mahathir Mohamad's Pakatan Harapan coalition, which formed a government (with the confidence and supply of WARISAN and UPKO) on 10 May 2018.

== History ==
Barisan Nasional (BN), under the second-term leadership of then UMNO president Najib Razak, was defeated in the 14th General Election and became the Opposition in the Parliament for the first time in Malaysian history. Rembau Member of Parliament (MP) Khairy Jamaluddin promised a shadow cabinet if he was elected UMNO president. He made such a promise to demonstrate the ability of BN to be a formidable opposition in the Parliament. But the majority of UMNO divisions elected former deputy prime minister Ahmad Zahid Hamidi as president. He was later formalised by the Parliament as Leader of the Opposition replacing current Deputy Prime Minister Wan Azizah Wan Ismail.

Khairy continued to call for the establishment of a shadow cabinet from Zahid despite being defeated in the UMNO presidential election. Khairy had even claimed that BN has established a shadow cabinet and its MPs were given portfolios, which was confirmed by UMNO secretary-general, Ketereh MP Annuar Musa, on 26 July. However, this claim was dismissed by Zahid on 4 August.

In previous parliamentary terms, Malaysia has never had a shadow cabinet. Then Pakatan Rakyat leader Anwar Ibrahim appointed a Frontbench Committee in the 12th Parliament, and DAP appointed spokespersons among MPs in the 13th Parliament, but never a full shadow cabinet.

== Details ==
Barisan Nasional (BN), as the largest opposition coalition in the Parliament, established a Shadow Cabinet on 26 September 2018. Each portfolio established in this Shadow Cabinet will also be comprising three professionals connected to their fields, including Women and Youth members, who will be elected at a later date.

This Shadow Cabinet is the first-ever to be formed in the history of Malaysia, by the largest opposition coalition of Barisan Nasional consisting of UMNO, MIC and MCA. This Shadow Cabinet is led by Leader of the Opposition Ahmad Zahid Hamidi and applies the Portfolio Committee system. The sole Member of Parliament (MP) from the PBRS is the only other representative even though UMNO Secretary-General Annuar Musa has encouraged MPs from the Sarawak Parties Alliance, Malaysian Islamic Party and United Alliance (Sabah) to join the committee.

The only portfolio from the actual Cabinet of Malaysia not to have a counterpart in this Shadow Cabinet is National Unity and Social Well-being.

As of 14 December 2018, the Shadow Cabinet consists of the 38 following opposition MPs:

UMNO (36) MCA (1) MIC (1)

=== Cluster 1: Prime Minister's Office, Law, Human Resources and Security ===
Portfolio	Leader	Party	Constituency	Deputy Leader	Party	Constituency
Prime Minister's Department	Ahmad Zahid Hamidi (Leader of the Opposition)	UMNO	Bagan Datok	Ismail Sabri Yaakob	UMNO	Bera
Prime Minister's Department	Ahmad Zahid Hamidi (Leader of the Opposition)	UMNO	Bagan Datok	Tengku Razaleigh Hamzah	UMNO	Gua Musang
Home Affairs	Dr. Shahidan Kassim	UMNO	Arau	Dr. Adham Baba	UMNO	Tenggara
Defence	Hishammuddin Hussein	UMNO	Sembrong	Vacant (Note: Kudat MP, Abd Rahim Bakri (UMNO) left the party on 12 December 2018 and became an independent; and therefore, exited the Shadow Cabinet.) (Note: Libaran MP, Zakaria Mohd. Edris (UMNO) left the party on 12 December 2018 and became an independent; and therefore, exited the Shadow Cabinet.)		
Human Resources	Dr. Ismail Abdul Muttalib	UMNO	Maran	Vacant		
Foreign Affairs	Reezal Merican Naina Merican	UMNO	Kepala Batas	Vacant		
Law	Azalina Othman Said	UMNO	Pengerang	Vacant (Note: Beluran MP, Dr. Ronald Kiandee (UMNO) left the party on 12 December 2018 and became an independent; and therefore, exited the Shadow Cabinet.)		

=== Cluster 2: Finance, the Economy and Industry ===
Portfolio	Leader	Party	Constituency	Deputy Leader	Party	Constituency
Finance	Khairy Jamaluddin Abu Bakar	UMNO	Rembau	Vacant (Note: Pensiangan MP, Arthur Joseph Kurup (PBRS), together with other six (6) Sabah UMNO MP had officially left Barisan Nasional on 12 December 2018; and therefore, exited the Shadow Cabinet.)		
Economic Affairs	Hasan Arifin	UMNO	Rompin	Vacant		
Entrepreneurship Development	Abdul Azeez Abdul Rahim	UMNO	Baling	Ahmad Nazlan Idris	UMNO	Jerantut
Domestic Trade and Consumer Affairs	Vacant (Note: Larut MP, Hamzah Zainudin left the party on 14 December 2018 and became an independent; and therefore, exited the Shadow Cabinet.)			Vacant (Note: Tanah Merah MP, Ikmal Hisham Abdul Aziz (UMNO) left the party on 14 December 2018 and became an independent; and therefore, exited the Shadow Cabinet.)		
Primary Industries	Vacant (Note: Cameron Highlands MP, Sivarajjh Chandran (MIC) was nullified by Election Courts his victory of 2018 General Election in Cameron Highlands on 30 November 2018, which later his seat was declared as VACANT, for the offence of bribery, vote-buying and corrupt practices committed to induce voters; and therefore, disqualified automatically from the Shadow Cabinet.)			Mastura Mohd. Yazid	UMNO	Kuala Kangsar
International Trade and Industry	Ahmad Maslan	UMNO	Pontian	Dr. Ismail Mohamed Said	UMNO	Kuala Krau

=== Cluster 3: Education, Social and Culture ===
Portfolio	Leader	Party	Constituency	Deputy Leader	Party	Constituency
Rural Development	Annuar Musa	UMNO	Ketereh	Ahmad Jazlan Yaakub	UMNO	Machang
Education	Mahdzir Khalid	UMNO	Padang Terap	Idris Jusoh	UMNO	Besut
Women, Family and Community Development	Dr. Noraini Ahmad	UMNO	Parit Sulong	Vacant (Note: Beaufort MP, Azizah Mohd. Dun (UMNO) left the party on 12 December 2018 and became an independent; and therefore, exited the Shadow Cabinet.)		
Housing and Local Government	Noh Omar	UMNO	Tanjong Karang	Halimah Mohd. Sadique	UMNO	Kota Tinggi
Youth and Sports	Mohd. Shahar Abdullah	UMNO	Paya Besar	Vacant (Note: Sipitang MP, Yamani Hafez Musa (UMNO) left the party on 12 December 2018 and became an independent; and therefore, exited the Shadow Cabinet.)		
Tourism, Art and Culture	Mohamed Nazri Abdul Aziz	UMNO	Padang Rengas	Jalaluddin Alias	UMNO	Jelebu
Religious Affairs	Vacant (Note: Tasek Gelugor MP, Shabudin Yahaya (UMNO) left the party on 14 December 2018 and became an independent; and therefore, exited the Shadow Cabinet.)			Zahidi Zainul Abidin	UMNO	Padang Besar

=== Cluster 4: Infrastructure, Technology and Health ===
Portfolio	Leader	Party	Constituency	Deputy Leader	Party	Constituency
Transport	Ir. Dr. Wee Ka Siong	MCA	Ayer Hitam	Mohd. Salim Shariff	UMNO	Jempol
Communication and Multimedia	Dr. Shamsul Anuar Nasarah	UMNO	Lenggong	Vacant		
Agriculture and Agro-based Industry	Tajuddin Abd. Rahman	UMNO	Pasir Salak	Vacant (Note: Sabak Bernam MP, Mohamad Fasiah Mohd. Fakeh (UMNO) left the party on 14 December 2018 and became an independent; and therefore, exited the Shadow Cabinet.)		
Health	Vacant (Note: Mersing MP, Dr. Abd. Latiff Ahmad (UMNO) left the party on 14 December 2018 and became an independent; and therefore, exited the Shadow Cabinet.)			Vacant (Note: Hulu Terengganu MP, Rosol Wahid (UMNO) left the party on 14 December 2018 and became an independent; and therefore, exited the Shadow Cabinet.)		
Water, Land and Natural Resources	Bung Moktar Radin	UMNO	Kinabatangan	Mohd. Nizar Zakaria	UMNO	Parit
Public Works	Saravanan Murugan	MIC	Tapah	Abdul Rahman Mohamad	UMNO	Lipis
Energy, Technology, Science, Climate Change and Environment	Ahmad Hamzah	UMNO	Jasin	Hasbullah Osman	UMNO	Gerik
Federal Territories	Tengku Adnan Tengku Mansor	UMNO	Putrajaya	Vacant (Note: Labuan MP Rozman Isli (UMNO) switched allegiance to WARISAN on 11 October 2018 and therefore, exited the Shadow Cabinet.)		

== See also ==
- Seventh Mahathir cabinet
- Cabinet of Malaysia
- Shadow Cabinet of Malaysia
