= Najib Cabinet =

Najib Cabinet is the name of either of two cabinets of Malaysia:

- Cabinet Najib I (2009–2013)
- Cabinet Najib II (2013–2018)
