= First Najib cabinet =

Ministerial configuration in Malaysia

- 18th Cabinet of Malaysia

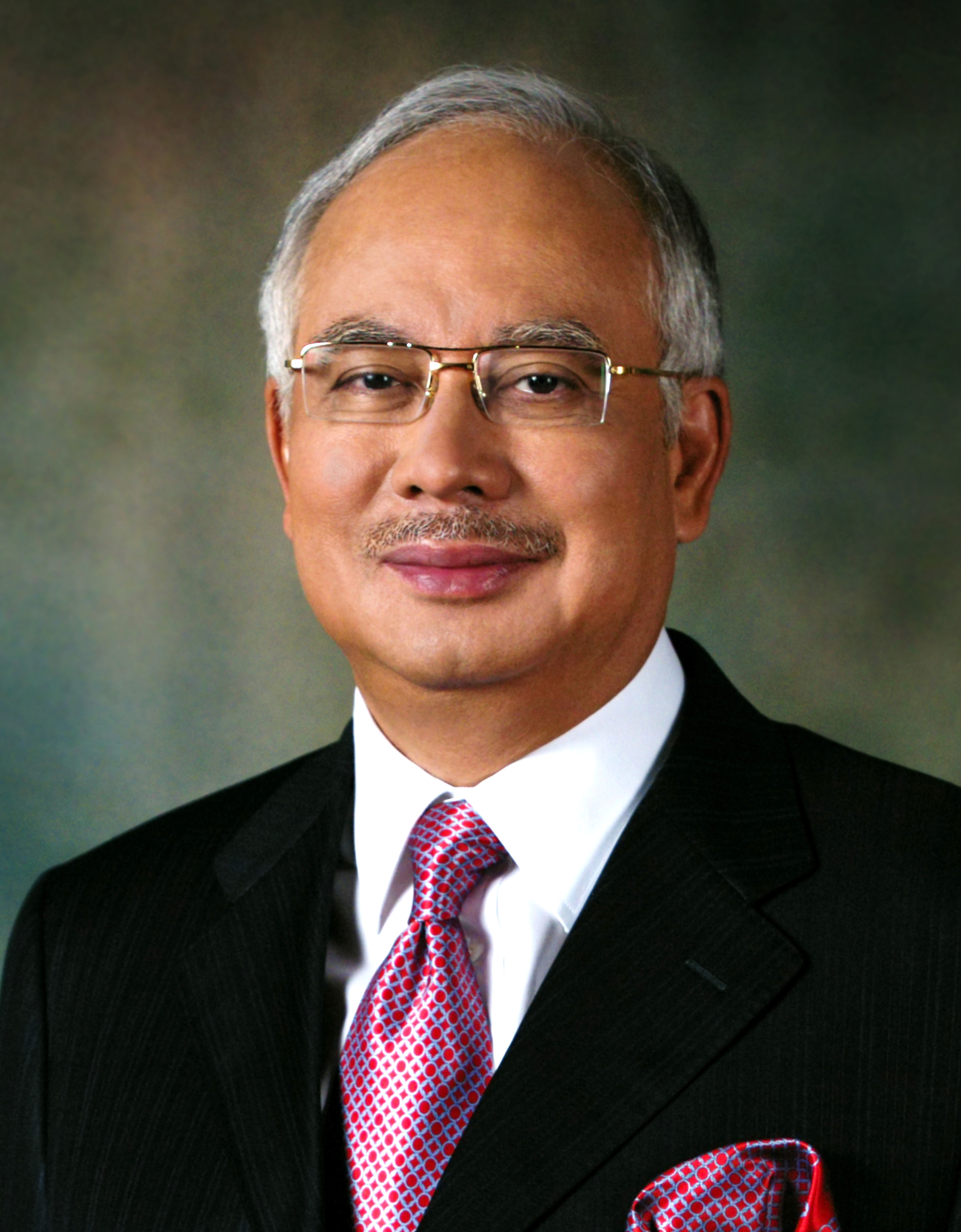
- Date formed: 10 April 2009
- Date dissolved: 16 May 2013

People and organisations
- Head of state: Tuanku Mizan Zainal Abidin (2009–2011); Tuanku Abdul Halim Muadzam Shah (2011–2013)
- Head of government: Najib Razak
- Head of government's history: Najib Government
- Deputy head of government: Muhyiddin Yassin
- No. of ministers: 33 ministers and 40 deputy ministers
- Member parties: Barisan Nasional: UMNO; PBB; MCA; PRS; PBS; MIC; SPDP; UPKO; GERAKAN; PBRS; SUPP; LDP; PPP
- Status in legislature: Coalition government
- Opposition cabinet: Frontbench Committees of Anwar Ibrahim
- Opposition parties: People's Justice Party; Democratic Action Party; Pan-Malaysian Islamic Party; Socialist Party of Malaysia
- Opposition leader: Anwar Ibrahim

History
- Outgoing election: 2013 Malaysian general election
- Legislature term: 12th Malaysian Parliament
- Budgets: 2010, 2011, 2012, 2013
- Predecessor: Third Abdullah cabinet
- Successor: Second Najib cabinet

Najib Razak formed the first Najib cabinet after being invited by Tuanku Mizan Zainal Abidin to begin a new government following the resignation of the previous prime minister of Malaysia, Abdullah Ahmad Badawi. It was the 18th cabinet of Malaysia formed since independence. Prior to the resignation, Abdullah led (as Prime Minister) the third Abdullah cabinet, a coalition government that consisted of members of the component parties of Barisan Nasional.

Najib announced his inaugural cabinet on 9 April 2009. Former Malaysia Airlines chief executive officer and managing director Idris Jala was added to the line-up on 28 August 2009.

Najib streamlined the cabinet to 28 members from 32 in the previous Abdullah Ahmad Badawi administration. His new line-up came under criticism from previous prime minister Mahathir Mohamad.

This is a list of the members of the first cabinet of the sixth Prime Minister of Malaysia, Najib Razak.

== Composition ==
=== Full members ===
The federal cabinet consisted of the following ministers:

Portfolio	Office bearer	Party	Constituency	Term start	Term end
Prime Minister	Dato' Sri Mohd. Najib Abdul Razak MP	UMNO	Pekan	3 April 2009	15 May 2013
Deputy Prime Minister	Tan Sri Dato' Haji Muhyiddin Mohd. Yassin MP	UMNO	Pagoh	10 April 2009	15 May 2013
Minister in the Prime Minister's Department	Dato' Seri Mohamed Nazri Abdul Aziz MP	UMNO	Padang Rengas	10 April 2009	15 May 2013
Minister in the Prime Minister's Department	Tan Sri Nor Mohamed Yakcop MP	UMNO	Tasek Gelugor	10 April 2009	15 May 2013
Minister in the Prime Minister's Department	Maj. Gen. (Rtd.) Dato' Seri Jamil Khir Baharom	UMNO	Senator	10 April 2009	15 May 2013
Minister in the Prime Minister's Department	Tan Sri Dr. Koh Tsu Koon	Gerakan	Senator	10 April 2009	15 May 2013
Minister in the Prime Minister's Department	Dato' Sri Idris Jala	Independent	Senator	28 August 2009	15 May 2013
Minister in the Prime Minister's Department	Datuk Seri Palanivel Govindasamy	MIC	Senator	9 August 2011	15 May 2013
Minister of Finance	Dato' Sri Mohd. Najib Abdul Razak MP	UMNO	Pekan	10 April 2009	15 May 2013
Minister of Finance	Dato' Seri Ahmad Husni Hanadzlah MP	UMNO	Tambun	10 April 2009	15 May 2013
Minister of Defence	Dato' Seri Dr. Ahmad Zahid Hamidi MP	UMNO	Bagan Datok	10 April 2009	15 May 2013
Minister of Home Affairs	Dato' Sri Hishammuddin Hussein MP	UMNO	Sembrong	10 April 2009	15 May 2013
Minister of International Trade and Industry	Dato' Sri Mustapa Mohamed MP	UMNO	Jeli	10 April 2009	15 May 2013
Minister of Education	Tan Sri Dato' Haji Muhyiddin Mohd. Yassin MP	UMNO	Pagoh	10 April 2009	15 May 2013
Minister of Natural Resources and Environment	Dato Sri Douglas Uggah Embas MP	PBB	Betong	10 April 2009	15 May 2013
Minister of Federal Territories and Urban Wellbeing	Dato' Raja Nong Chik Zainal Abidin	UMNO	Senator	10 April 2009	15 May 2013
Minister of Transport	Dato' Sri Ong Tee Keat MP	MCA	Pandan	10 April 2009	4 June 2010
Minister of Transport	Dato' Seri Kong Cho Ha MP	MCA	Lumut	4 June 2010	15 May 2013
Minister of Agriculture and Agro-based Industry	Datuk Seri Noh Omar MP	UMNO	Tanjong Karang	10 April 2009	15 May 2013
Minister of Health	Dato' Seri Liow Tiong Lai MP	MCA	Bentong	10 April 2009	15 May 2013
Minister of Tourism	Dato' Sri Ng Yen Yen MP	MCA	Raub	16 April 2009	15 May 2013
Minister of Housing and Local Government	Dato' Seri Kong Cho Ha MP	MCA	Lumut	10 April 2009	4 June 2010
Minister of Housing and Local Government	Dato' Seri Chor Chee Heung MP	MCA	Alor Setar	4 June 2010	15 May 2013
Minister of Foreign Affairs	Datuk Seri Panglima Anifah Aman MP	UMNO	Kimanis	10 April 2009	15 May 2013
Minister of Higher Education	Dato' Seri Mohamed Khaled Nordin MP	UMNO	Pasir Gudang	10 April 2009	15 May 2013
Minister of Human Resources	Datuk Seri Subramaniam Sathasivam MP	MIC	Segamat	10 April 2009	15 May 2013
Minister of Domestic Trade, Co-operatives and Consumerism	Dato' Sri Ismail Sabri Yaakob MP	UMNO	Bera	10 April 2009	15 May 2013
Minister of Rural and Regional Development	Datuk Seri Panglima Shafie Apdal MP	UMNO	Semporna	10 April 2009	15 May 2013
Minister of Works	Dato' Seri Shaziman Abu Mansor MP	UMNO	Tampin	10 April 2009	15 May 2013
Minister of Science, Technology and Innovation	Datuk Seri Panglima Maximus Johnity Ongkili MP	PBS	Kota Marudu	10 April 2009	15 May 2013
Minister of Energy, Green Technology and Water	Dato' Sri Peter Chin Fah Kui MP	SUPP	Miri	10 April 2009	15 May 2013
Minister for Plantation Industries and Commodities	Tan Sri Datuk Seri Panglima Bernard Giluk Dompok MP	UPKO	Penampang	10 April 2009	15 May 2013
Minister of Women, Family and Community Development	Dato' Seri Sharizat Abdul Jalil	UMNO	Senator	10 April 2009	8 April 2012
Minister of Women, Family and Community Development	Dato' Sri Mohd. Najib Abdul Razak MP	UMNO	Pekan	8 April 2012	15 May 2013
Minister of Youth and Sports	Dato' Sri Ahmad Shabery Cheek MP	UMNO	Kemaman	10 April 2009	15 May 2013
Minister of Information, Communications, Arts and Culture	Dato' Seri Utama Rais Yatim MP	UMNO	Jelebu	10 April 2009	15 May 2013

=== Deputy ministers ===
Portfolio	Office bearer	Party	Constituency	Term start	Term end
Deputy Minister in the Prime Minister's Department	Dato' Mashitah Ibrahim	UMNO	Senator	10 April 2009	15 May 2013
Deputy Minister in the Prime Minister's Department	Datuk Ahmad Maslan MP	UMNO	Pontian	10 April 2009	15 May 2013
Deputy Minister in the Prime Minister's Department	Dato' Sri Devamany Krishnasamy MP	MIC	Cameron Highlands	10 April 2009	15 May 2013
Deputy Minister in the Prime Minister's Department	Dato' Murugiah Thopasamy	PPP	Senator	10 April 2009	15 May 2013
Deputy Minister in the Prime Minister's Department	Datuk Liew Vui Keong MP	LDP	Sandakan	10 April 2009	15 May 2013
Deputy Minister of Finance	Dato' Awang Adek Hussin	UMNO	Senator	10 April 2009	15 May 2013
Deputy Minister of Finance	Dato' Wira Chor Chee Heung MP	MCA	Alor Setar	10 April 2009	4 June 2010
Deputy Minister of Finance	Dato' Donald Lim Siang Chai	MCA	Senator	4 June 2010	15 May 2013
Deputy Minister of Defence	Datuk Abdul Latiff Ahmad MP	UMNO	Mersing	10 April 2009	15 May 2013
Deputy Minister of Home Affairs	Datuk Wira Abu Seman Yusop	UMNO	Masjid Tanah	10 April 2009	15 May 2013
Deputy Minister of Home Affairs	Jelaing Mersat MP	SPDP	Saratok	10 April 2009	4 June 2010
Deputy Minister of Home Affairs	Lee Chee Leong MP	MCA	Kampar	4 June 2010	15 May 2013
Deputy Minister of International Trade and Industry	Mukhriz Mahathir MP	UMNO	Jerlun	10 April 2009	15 May 2013
Deputy Minister of International Trade and Industry	Jacob Dungau Sagan MP	SPDP	Baram	10 April 2009	15 May 2013
Deputy Minister of Education	Mohd Puad Zarkashi MP	UMNO	Batu Pahat	10 April 2009	15 May 2013
Deputy Minister of Education	Wee Ka Siong MP	MCA	Ayer Hitam	10 April 2009	15 May 2013
Deputy Minister of Natural Resources and Environment	Joseph Kurup MP	PBRS	Pensiangan	10 April 2009	15 May 2013
Deputy Minister of Federal Territories and Urban Wellbeing	Saravanan Murugan MP	MIC	Tapah	10 April 2009	15 May 2013
Deputy Minister of Transport	Abdul Rahim Bakri MP	UMNO	Kudat	10 April 2009	15 May 2013
Deputy Minister of Transport	Robert Lau Hoi Chew MP	SUPP	Sibu	10 April 2009	9 April 2010
Deputy Minister of Transport	Jelaing Mersat MP	SPDP	Saratok	4 June 2010	15 May 2013
Deputy Minister of Agriculture and Agro-based Industry	Mohd. Johari Baharum MP	UMNO	Kubang Pasu	10 April 2009	15 May 2013
Deputy Minister of Agriculture and Agro-based Industry	Rohani Abdul Karim MP	PBB	Batang Lupar	10 April 2009	4 June 2010
Deputy Minister of Agriculture and Agro-based Industry	Chua Tee Yong MP	MCA	Labis	4 June 2010	15 May 2013
Deputy Minister of Health	Rosnah Abdul Rashid Shirlin MP	UMNO	Papar	10 April 2009	15 May 2013
Deputy Minister of Tourism	Sulaiman Abdul Rahman Taib MP	PBB	Kota Samarahan	10 April 2009	14 December 2009
Deputy Minister of Tourism	Dr. James Dawos Mamit MP	PBB	Mambong	14 December 2009	15 May 2013
Deputy Minister of Housing, and Local Government	Lajim Ukin MP	UMNO	Beaufort	10 April 2009	30 July 2012
Deputy Minister of Foreign Affairs	A. Kohillan Pillay	Gerakan	Senator	10 April 2009	15 May 2013
Deputy Minister of Foreign Affairs	Lee Chee Leong MP	MCA	Kampar	10 April 2009	4 June 2010
Deputy Minister of Foreign Affairs	Richard Riot Jaem MP	SUPP	Serian	4 June 2010	15 May 2013
Deputy Minister of Higher Education	Dato' Saifuddin Abdullah MP	UMNO	Temerloh	10 April 2009	15 May 2013
Deputy Minister of Higher Education	Dato' Hou Kok Chung MP	MCA	Kluang	10 April 2009	15 May 2013
Deputy Minister of Human Resources	Dato' Maznah Mazlan	UMNO	Senator	10 April 2009	15 May 2013
Deputy Minister of Domestic Trade, Co-operatives and Consumerism	Dato' Tan Lian Hoe MP	Gerakan	Gerik	10 April 2009	15 May 2013
Deputy Minister of Domestic Trade, Co-operatives and Consumerism	Rohani Abdul Karim MP	PBB	Batang Lupar	4 June 2010	15 May 2013
Deputy Minister of Rural and Regional Development	Hasan Malek MP	UMNO	Kuala Pilah	10 April 2009	15 May 2013
Deputy Minister of Rural and Regional Development	Joseph Entulu Belaun MP	PRS	Selangau	10 April 2009	15 May 2013
Deputy Minister of Works	Yong Khoon Seng MP	SUPP	Stampin	10 April 2009	15 May 2013
Deputy Minister of Science, Technology and Innovation	Fadillah Yusof MP	PBB	Petra Jaya	10 April 2009	15 May 2013
Deputy Minister of Energy, Green Technology and Water	Noriah Kasnon MP	UMNO	Sungai Besar	10 April 2009	15 May 2013
Deputy Minister of Plantation Industries and Commodities	Hamzah Zainudin MP	UMNO	Larut	10 April 2009	15 May 2013
Deputy Minister of Plantation Industries and Commodities	Dato' Palanivel Govindasamy	MIC	Senator	4 June 2010	9 August 2011
Deputy Minister of Women, Family and Community Development	Datin Paduka Chew Mei Fun	MCA	Senator	10 April 2009	4 June 2010
Deputy Minister of Women, Family and Community Development	Datuk Heng Seai Kie	MCA	Senator	4 June 2010	15 May 2013
Deputy Minister of Youth and Sports	Dato' Razali Ibrahim MP	UMNO	Muar	10 April 2009	15 May 2013
Deputy Minister of Youth and Sports	Datuk Wee Jeck Seng MP	MCA	Tanjong Piai	10 April 2009	4 June 2010
Deputy Minister of Youth and Sports	Gan Ping Sieu	MCA	Senator	4 June 2010	15 May 2013
Deputy Minister of Information, Communications and Culture	Heng Seai Kie	MCA	Senator	10 April 2009	4 June 2010
Deputy Minister of Information, Communications and Culture	Datuk Joseph Salang Gandum MP	PRS	Julau	10 April 2009	15 May 2013
Deputy Minister of Information, Communications and Culture	Datuk Maglin Dennis d'Cruz	PPP	Senator	4 June 2010	15 May 2013

== See also ==
- Members of the Dewan Rakyat, 12th Malaysian Parliament
- Frontbench Committees of Anwar Ibrahim
