= Daeng Sanusi Daeng Mariok =

Malaysian politician

Daeng Sanusi Mariok
- داءيڠ سنوسي داءيڠ ماريؤ

Ahli Dewan Rakyat Malaysia

Member of the Malaysian Parliament for Rantau Panjang
- In office 1990–1999
- Preceded by: Mohamed Yaacob (BN–UMNO)
- Succeeded by: Abdul Fatah Harun (PAS)
- Constituency: Pasir Mas Hulu
- Majority: 0000

Personal details
- Born: Daeng Sanusi Daeng Mariok; 1938 (age 87–88) Johor
- Citizenship: Malaysian
- Party: Malaysian Islamic Party (PAS)
- Other political affiliations: Perikatan Nasional (PN), Muafakat Nasional (MN), Gagasan Sejahtera (GS), Pakatan Rakyat (PR), Barisan Alternatif (BA), Gagasan Rakyat (GR), Harakah Keadilan Rakyat (HAK)
- Education: Kolej Islam Malaya
- Alma mater: University of Al-Azhar
- Occupation: Politician
- Profession: Educator

Daeng Sanusi bin Daeng Mariok is a Malaysian politician who has served as Member of the Dewan Rakyat for Rantau Panjang since 1990 to 1999. He is a member of PAS, a component party of the ruling Perikatan Nasional (PN) coalition at both federal and state levels. At the party level, he is the Chairman of PAS Central Disciplinary Committee, former PAS Johor Executive Board, and former PAS Vice President.

== Election results ==
Parliament of Malaysia
Year	Constituency	Candidate	Votes	Pct	Opponent(s)	Votes	Pct	Ballots cast	Majority	Turnout
1990	P021 Rantau Panjang	Daeng Sanusi Daeng Mariok (PAS)	18,618	61.12%	Husein Ahmad (UMNO)	11,841	38.88%	31,073	6,777	75.57%
1995	P023 Rantau Panjang	Daeng Sanusi Daeng Mariok (PAS)	16,284	58.03%	Abdullah Mat Yasim (UMNO)	11,779	41.97%	29,229	4,505	68.37%

Johor State Legislative Assembly
Year	Constituency	Candidate	Votes	Pct	Opponent(s)	Votes	Pct	Ballots cast	Majority	Turnout
2004	N22 Parit Raja	Daeng Sanusi Daeng Mariok (PAS)	2,754	20.92%	Ab Aziz Kaprawi (UMNO)	10,410	79.08%	13,164	7,656	76.41%
