= Frontbench Committees of Anwar Ibrahim =

List of Malaysian MPs who shadow ministries

On 2 July 2009, Pakatan Rakyat announced a list of its Members of Parliament who would shadow individual ministries. DAP Member of Parliament Tony Pua stated that this front bench would explicitly not be a Shadow Cabinet because the Malaysian Parliament does not recognise the institution of a Shadow Cabinet.

== Members of the Frontbench Committees ==
DAP (28 members)
PKR (27 members)
PAS (23 members)

Party	Spokesperson(s)	Ministry
PKR	Anwar Ibrahim	Prime Minister's Department
PKR	Mohamed Azmin Ali	Prime Minister's Department
PKR	Sivarasa Rasiah	Prime Minister's Department
PKR	Abdul Khalid Ibrahim	Prime Minister's Department
PKR	William Leong Jee Keen	Prime Minister's Department
PKR	Ahmad Kassim	Prime Minister's Department
PKR	Fuziah Salleh	Prime Minister's Department
DAP	Lim Kit Siang	Prime Minister's Department
DAP	Ngeh Koo Ham	Prime Minister's Department
DAP	Hiew King Cheu	Prime Minister's Department
DAP	John Fernandez	Prime Minister's Department
PAS	Abdul Hadi Awang	Prime Minister's Department
PAS	Nasharudin Mat Isa	Prime Minister's Department
PAS	Salahuddin Ayub	Prime Minister's Department
PAS	Mohd Hatta Ramli	Prime Minister's Department
PAS	Dzulkefly Ahmad	Prime Minister's Department
PAS	Taib Azamudden Md Taib	Prime Minister's Department
PAS	Khalid Abdul Samad	Prime Minister's Department
PKR	Johari Abdul	Home Affairs
DAP	Karpal Singh	Home Affairs
PAS	Salahuddin Ayub	Home Affairs
PKR	Mohamed Azmin Ali	Finance
DAP	Lim Guan Eng	Finance
PAS	Dzulkefly Ahmad	Finance
PKR	Zahrain Mohamed Hashim	Transport
DAP	Tan Kok Wai	Transport
PAS	Khalid Abdul Samad	Transport
PKR	Kamarul Bahrin Abbas	Works
DAP	Gobind Singh Deo	Works
PAS	Mahfuz Omar	Works
PKR	Rashid Din	Plantation Industries and Commodities
DAP	Er Teck Hwa	Plantation Industries and Commodities
PAS	Wan Abdul Rahim Wan Abdullah	Plantation Industries and Commodities
PKR	Chua Tian Chang	Energy, Green Technology and Water
DAP	Charles Anthony Santiago	Energy, Green Technology and Water
PAS	Mohd Nasir Zakaria	Energy, Green Technology and Water
PKR	William Leong Jee Keen	International Trade and Industry
DAP	Teresa Kok Suh Sim	International Trade and Industry
PAS	Mohd Hatta Ramli	International Trade and Industry
PKR	Ahmad Kassim	Agriculture and Agro-based Industry
DAP	Sim Tong Him	Agriculture and Agro-based Industry
PAS	Taib Azamudden Md Taib	Agriculture and Agro-based Industry
PKR	Azan Ismail	Domestic Trade, Co-operatives and Consumerism
DAP	Jeff Ooi Chuan Aun	Domestic Trade, Co-operatives and Consumerism
PAS	Mohd Abdul Wahid Endut	Domestic Trade, Co-operatives and Consumerism
PKR	Yusmadi Yusoff	Education
DAP	Chong Eng	Education
PAS	Che Uda Che Nik	Education
PKR	Amran Abdul Ghani	Information, Communications and Culture
DAP	Teo Nie Ching	Information, Communications and Culture
PAS	Mahfuz Omar	Information, Communications and Culture
PKR	Abdullah Sani Abdul Hamid	Human Resources
DAP	Kulasegaran Murugeson	Human Resources
PAS	Muhammad Husin	Human Resources
PKR	Nurul Izzah Anwar	Science, Technology and Innovation
DAP	Chow Kon Yeow	Science, Technology and Innovation
PAS	Che Rosli Che Mat	Science, Technology and Innovation
PKR	Hee Loy Sian	Housing and Local Government
DAP	Nga Kor Ming	Housing and Local Government
PAS	Siti Mariah Mahmud	Housing and Local Government
PKR	Saifuddin Nasution Ismail	Defence
DAP	Liew Chin Tong	Defence
PAS	Mohammad Nizar Jamaluddin	Defence
PKR	Abdul Aziz Abdul Kadir	Rural and Regional Development
DAP	Manogaran Marimuthu	Rural and Regional Development
PAS	Abdul Halim Abdul Rahman	Rural and Regional Development
PKR	Sivarasa Rasiah	Foreign Affairs
DAP	Ramasamy Palanisamy	Foreign Affairs
PAS	Kamarudin Jaffar	Foreign Affairs
PKR	Tan Tee Beng	Youth and Sports
DAP	Anthony Loke Siew Fook	Youth and Sports
PAS	Mohd Firdaus Jaafar	Youth and Sports
PKR	Lee Boon Chye	Health
DAP	Tan Seng Giaw	Health
PAS	Mohd Hayati Othman	Health
PKR	Zuraida Kamaruddin	Women, Family and Community Development
DAP	Fong Po Kuan	Women, Family and Community Development
PAS	Siti Zailah Mohd Yusoff	Women, Family and Community Development
PKR	Manikavasagam Sundram	Tourism
DAP	Fong Kui Lun	Tourism
PAS	Wan Abdul Rahim Wan Abdullah	Tourism
PKR	Wee Choo Keong	Federal Territories
DAP	Lim Lip Eng	Federal Territories
PAS	Lo' Lo' Mohd Ghazali	Federal Territories
PKR	Zulkifli Nordin	Higher Education
DAP	Tony Pua	Higher Education
PAS	Salahuddin Ayub	Higher Education
PKR	Gobalakrishnan Nagapan	Natural Resources and Environment
DAP	Chong Chieng Jen	Natural Resources and Environment
PAS	Mujahid Yusof Rawa	Natural Resources and Environment
