= DAP Spokesperson of the 13th Parliament =

This article lists spokespersons of Democratic Action Party (DAP) of Malaysia in the 13th Parliament issued on 19 May 2015. All DAP MPs elected in the 13th Parliament were in list except Lim Kit Siang, Lim Guan Eng and Tan Seng Giaw.

== Frontbenchers ==
Portfolio (in alphabetical order)	Shadow Minister	Constituency	Term
Agriculture, Commodities and Rural Development	Ariff Sabri Abdul Aziz	Raub	2015–2018
Consumer Affairs	Sim Tong Him	Kota Melaka	2015–2017
Culture, Tourism and Communication	Anthony Loke Siew Fook	Seremban	2015–2018
Education, Science and Technology	Zairil Khir Johari	Bukit Bendera	2015–2018
Federal Territories	Tan Kok Wai	Cheras	2015–2018
Finance and Economy	Tony Pua Kiam Wee	Petaling Jaya Utara	2015–2018
Foreign and Defence	Kulasegaran Murugeson	Ipoh Barat	2015–2018
Health and Environment	Ong Kian Ming	Serdang	2015–2018
Home and Law	Gobind Singh Deo	Puchong	2015–2018
Housing	Ng Wei Aik	Tanjong	2015–2018
Human Resources	Sivakumar Varatharaju Naidu	Batu Gajah	2015–2018
International Trade and Industry	Teresa Kok Suh Sim	Seputeh	2015–2018
Local Government and Urban Issues	Nga Kor Ming	Taiping	2015–2018
Sabah	Jimmy Wong Sze Phin	Kota Kinabalu	2015–2018
Sarawak	Chong Chieng Jen	Bandar Kuching	2015–2018
Transport and Works	Liew Chin Tong	Kluang	2015–2018
Women and Welfare	Teo Nie Ching	Kulai	2015–2018
Youth and Sports	Teo Kok Seong	Rasah	2015–2018
Source: The Rocket

== Backbenchers ==
Portfolio (in alphabetical order)	Deputy Shadow Minister(s)	Constituency
Agriculture, Commodities and Rural Development	Wong Ling Biu	Sarikei
Consumer Affairs	Er Teck Hwa	Bakri
Consumer Affairs	Lim Lip Eng	Segambut
Culture, Tourism and Communication	Jeff Ooi Chuan Aun	Jelutong
Culture, Tourism and Communication	Fong Kui Lun	Bukit Bintang
Education, Science and Technology	Teo Nie Ching	Kulai
Education, Science and Technology	Sivakumar Varatharaju Naidu	Batu Gajah
Education, Science and Technology	Julian Tan Kok Ping	Stampin
Education, Science and Technology	Teo Kok Seong	Rasah
Federal Territories	Fong Kui Lun	Bukit Bintang
Finance and Economy	Oscar Ling Chai Yew	Sibu
Finance and Economy	Wong Tien Fatt	Sandakan
Foreign and Defence	Julian Tan Kok Ping	Stampin
Foreign and Defence	Kasthuriraani Patto	Batu Kawan
Health and Environment	Ko Chung Sen	Kampar
Health and Environment	Oscar Ling Chai Yew	Sibu
Health and Environment	Alice Lau Kiong Yieng	Lanang
Home and Law	Ngeh Koo Ham	Beruas
Home and Law	Thomas Su Keong Siong	Ipoh Timor
Home and Law	Ramkarpal Singh	Bukit Gelugor
Housing	Ramkarpal Singh	Bukit Gelugor
Housing	Oscar Ling Chai Yew	Sibu
Housing	Wong Tien Fatt	Sandakan
Human Resources	Steven Sim Chee Keong	Bukit Mertajam
International Trade and Industry	Charles Santiago	Klang
Local Government and Urban Issues	Jeff Ooi Chuan Aun	Jelutong
Transport and Works	Alice Lau Kiong Yieng	Lanang
Women and Welfare	Alice Lau Kiong Yieng	Lanang
Women and Welfare	Kasthuriraani Patto	Batu Kawan
Women and Welfare	Steven Sim Chee Keong	Bukit Mertajam
Youth and Sports	Kasthuriraani Patto	Batu Kawan
Source: The Rocket

== See also ==
- Opposition (Malaysia)
- Shadow Cabinet of Malaysia
