= Rantau Panjang (federal constituency) =

Federal constituency of Kelantan, Malaysia

Rantau Panjang (P023)
Kelantan constituency

Federal constituency
- Legislature: Dewan Rakyat
- MP: Siti Zailah Mohd Yusoff; PN
- Constituency created: 1974
- First contested: 1974
- Last contested: 2022

Demographics
- Population (2020): 119,648
- Electors (2023): 94,026
- Area (km²): 392
- Pop. density (per km²): 305.2

Rantau Panjang is a federal constituency in Pasir Mas District, Kelantan, Malaysia, that has been represented in the Dewan Rakyat since 1974.

The federal constituency was created in the 1974 redistribution and is mandated to return a single member to the Dewan Rakyat under the first past the post voting system.

== Demographics ==
https://live.chinapress.com.my/ge15/parliament/KELANTAN

Ethnic breakdown of Rantau Panjang's electorate as of 2022
1. Malay (97.3%)
2. Chinese (1.90%)
3. Other ethnicities (0.60%)
4. Indian (0.20%)

As of 2020, Rantau Panjang has a population of 116,948 people.

Age breakdown of Rantau Panjang's electorate as of 2022
1. 18-20 (6.53%)
2. 21-29 (22.7%)
3. 30-39 (23.4%)
4. 40-49 (16.9%)
5. 50-59 (13.4%)
6. 60-69 (9.75%)
7. 70-79 (5.04%)
8. 80-89 (1.71%)
9. above 90 (0.53%)
Gender breakdown of Rantau Panjang's electorate as of 2022
1. Male (49.5%)
2. Female (50.5%)

== History ==
=== Polling districts ===
According to the federal gazette issued on 18 July 2023, the Rantau Panjang constituency is divided into 38 polling districts.

State constituency	Polling Districts	Code	Location
Chetok (N14）	Tanjong Redang	023/14/01	SK Lemal
Chetok (N14）	Lemal	023/14/02	SMK Tengku Panglima Raja
Chetok (N14）	Kelar	023/14/03	SK Kelar
Chetok (N14）	Kangkong	023/14/04	SK Kangkong
Chetok (N14）	Binjal	023/14/05	SMK Kangkong
Chetok (N14）	Chetok	023/14/06	SK Chabang Tiga Chetok
Chetok (N14）	Gelam	023/14/07	SK Kubang Chetok
Chetok (N14）	Rasal	023/14/08	SMU (A) Tarbiah Diniah Tok Uban
Chetok (N14）	Galok	023/14/09	SK Chetok
Chetok (N14）	Bendang Pauh	023/14/10	SK Bendang Pauh
Chetok (N14）	Jabo	023/14/11	SMU (A) Mardziah Jabo Chetok
Chetok (N14）	Bechah Kelubi	023/14/12	SK Bechah Kelubi
Chetok (N14）	Kubang Gendang	023/14/13	SMK Chetok
Gual Periok (N15）	Lubok Gong	023/15/01	SK Gual To' Deh
Gual Periok (N15）	Kedai Gual Periok	023/15/02	SK Gual Periok
Gual Periok (N15）	Gual Sitok	023/15/03	SK Gual Sitok
Gual Periok (N15）	Pekan Rantau Panjang	023/15/04	SK Sri Rantau Panjang (1)
Gual Periok (N15）	Kedai Lama	023/15/05	SK Rantau Panjang
Gual Periok (N15）	Banggol Kulim	023/15/06	Maahad Muhammadi Rantau Panjang
Gual Periok (N15）	Bakat	023/15/07	SMK Gual Periok
Gual Periok (N15）	Kubang Kual	023/15/08	SK Kubang Kuau
Gual Periok (N15）	Bukit Tandak	023/15/09	SMK Baroh Pial
Gual Periok (N15）	Kuala Itek	023/15/10	SK Kok Pauh
Gual Periok (N15）	Lubok Setol	023/15/11	SK Lubok Setol
Gual Periok (N15）	Kampung Rahmat	023/15/12	SK Rahmat
Apam Putra（N16）	Lubok Tapah	023/16/01	SK Lati
Apam Putra（N16）	Nibong	023/16/02	SMK To' Uban
Apam Putra（N16）	Pengkalan Machang	023/16/03	SK To' Uban
Apam Putra（N16）	Kampung Bujok	023/16/04	SK Bukit Jarum
Apam Putra（N16）	Repek	023/16/05	SK Sri Kiambang
Apam Putra（N16）	Lati	023/16/06	SMA Lati
Apam Putra（N16）	Chicha Tinggi	023/16/07	SK Chicha Tinggi
Apam Putra（N16）	Cherang Hangus	023/16/08	SK Kampong Baru
Apam Putra（N16）	Taman	023/16/09	SMK Sri Kiambang
Apam Putra（N16）	Batu Karang	023/16/10	SMU (A) Darul Saadah Batu Karang
Apam Putra（N16）	Bukit Tuku	023/16/11	SK Bukit Perah
Apam Putra（N16）	Baroh Pial	023/16/12	SK Baroh Pial
Apam Putra（N16）	Chandan	023/16/13	SMA (Arab) Al-Balaghul Mubin

=== Representation history ===
Members of Parliament for Rantau Panjang
Parliament	No	Years	Member	Party	Vote Share
Constituency created, renamed from Pasir Mas Hulu
4th	P021	1974–1978	Zakaria Ismail (زكريا اسماعيل)	BN (PAS)	11,826; 77.97%
5th	P021	1978–1982	Ibrahim Muhammad (إبراهيم محمد)	BN (UMNO)	9,433; 55.48%
6th	P021	1982–1986	Hassan Mohamed (حسن محمد)	PAS	11,145; 50.95%
7th	P021	1986–1990	Mohamed Yaacob (محمد يعقوب)	BN (UMNO)	13,196; 52.83%
8th	P021	1990–1995	Daeng Sanusi Daeng Mariok (داءيڠ سنوسي داءيڠ ماريؤ)	PAS	18,618; 61.12%
9th	P023	1995–1999	Daeng Sanusi Daeng Mariok (داءيڠ سنوسي داءيڠ ماريؤ)	PAS	16,284; 58.03%
10th	P023	1999–2004	Abdul Fatah Harun (عبدالفتح هارون)	BA (PAS)	19,711; 63.88%
11th	P023	2004–2008	Abdul Fatah Harun (عبدالفتح هارون)	PAS	15,027; 51.25%
12th	P023	2008–2013	Siti Zailah Mohd Yusoff (سيتي ظل ﷲ محمد يوسف)	PR (PAS)	19,344; 56.02%
13th	P023	2013–2018	Siti Zailah Mohd Yusoff (سيتي ظل ﷲ محمد يوسف)	PR (PAS)	23,767; 57.73%
14th	P023	2018–2020	Siti Zailah Mohd Yusoff (سيتي ظل ﷲ محمد يوسف)	PAS	24,581; 50.82%
14th	P023	2020–2022	Siti Zailah Mohd Yusoff (سيتي ظل ﷲ محمد يوسف)	PN (PAS)	24,581; 50.82%
15th	P023	2022–present	Siti Zailah Mohd Yusoff (سيتي ظل ﷲ محمد يوسف)	PN (PAS)	37,579; 62.38%

=== State constituency ===
Parliamentary constituency	State constituency						
Parliamentary constituency	1955–1959*	1959–1974	1974–1986	1986–1995	1995–2004	2004–2018	2018–present
Rantau Panjang							Apam Putra
Rantau Panjang				Bukit Tuku			
Rantau Panjang				Chetok			Chetok
Rantau Panjang			Gual Periok				
Rantau Panjang			Lemal				
Rantau Panjang					Meranti		
Rantau Panjang			Tok Uban				

=== Historical boundaries ===
State Constituency	Area				
State Constituency	1974	1984	1994	2003	2018
Apam Putra					Apam Putra; Bandar Baru Pasir Mas; Bukit Tuku; Gual Kulim; Lubok Jong
Bukit Tuku		Apam Putra; Bandar Baru Pasir Mas; Bukit Tuku; Gabus; Lubok Jong			
Chetok		Chetok; Chicha Tinggi; Gabus; Perupok; To Uban			Chicha Tinggi; Kampung Buluh Melintang; Kampung Kangkong; Peruok; Semuba
Gual Periok	Banggol Kulim; Kampung Alor Tasek Berangan; Kampung Kedap; Lubok Stol; Rantau Panjang	Banggol Kulim; Kampung Bukit Nerah; Kampung Alor Tasek Berangan; Kampung Kedap; Rantau Panjang		Banggol Kulim; Gual Nering; Kampung Alor Tasek Berangan; Kampung Kedap; Rantau Panjang	
Lemal	Apam Putra; Bukit Tuku; Gabus; Lemal; Lubok Jong				
Meranti			Banggol Kong; Kampung Siram; Kubang Sawa; Meranti; Padang Mandol	Bayu Lalang; Banggol Che Wan; Kampung Gelang Mas; Lubuk Kawah; Meranti	
Tok Uban	Chetok; Chicha Tinggi; Gabus; Perupok; To Uban				

=== Current state assembly members ===
No.	State Constituency	Member	Coalition (Party)
N14	Chetok	Zuraidin Abdullah	PN (PAS)
N15	Gual Periok	Kamaruzaman Mohamad	PN (PAS)
N16	Apam Putra	Zamakhshari Mohamad	PN (PAS)

=== Local governments & postcodes ===
No.	State Constituency	Local Government	Postcodes
N14	Chetok	Pasir Mas District Council	17000, 17040, 17050, 17060, 17070 Pasir Mas; 17200 Rantau Panjang
N15	Gual Periok	Pasir Mas District Council	17000, 17040, 17050, 17060, 17070 Pasir Mas; 17200 Rantau Panjang
N16	Apam Putra	Pasir Mas District Council	17000, 17040, 17050, 17060, 17070 Pasir Mas; 17200 Rantau Panjang

== Election results ==
Malaysian general election, 2022
Party	Candidate	Votes	%	∆%
PAS	Siti Zailah Mohd Yusoff	37,759	62.38	▲11.56
BN	Zulkarnain Yusoff	17,123	28.29	▼9.81
PH	Wan Shah Jihan Wan Din	4,256	7.03	▲7.03
PUTRA	Ibrahim Ali	1,216	2.01	▲2.01
Parti Rakyat Malaysia	Mohd Zain Ismail	173	0.29	▲0.29
Total valid votes		60,527	100.00	
Total rejected ballots		668		
Unreturned ballots		211		
Turnout		61,406	64.91	▼10.17
Registered electors		93,248		
Majority		20,636	34.09	▲21.37
PAS hold		Swing		
Source(s) https://lom.agc.gov.my/ilims/upload/portal/akta/outputp/1753266/PUB%20607%20(2022).pdf

Malaysian general election, 2018
Party	Candidate	Votes	%	∆%
PAS	Siti Zailah Mohd Yusoff	24,581	50.82	▼6.91
BN	Abdullah Mat Yasim	18,431	38.10	▼4.17
PKR	Wan Shah Jihan Wan Din	5,361	11.08	▲11.08
Total valid votes		48,373	100.00	
Total rejected ballots		825		
Unreturned ballots		441		
Turnout		49,639	75.08	▼4.19
Registered electors		66,115		
Majority		6,150	12.72	▼2.74
PAS hold		Swing		
Source(s) "His Majesty's Government Gazette - Notice of Contested Election, Parliament for the State of Kelantan [P.U. (B) 234/2018]" (PDF). Attorney General's Chambers of Malaysia. 3 May 2018. "Federal Government Gazette - Results of Contested Election and Statements of the Poll after the Official Addition of Votes, Parliamentary Constituencies for the State of Kelantan [P.U. (B) 308/2018]" (PDF). Attorney General's Chambers of Malaysia. 28 May 2018.

Malaysian general election, 2013
Party	Candidate	Votes	%	∆%
PAS	Siti Zailah Mohd Yusoff	23,767	57.73	▲1.71
BN	Ghazali Ismail	17,405	42.27	▼0.76
Total valid votes		41,172	100.00	
Total rejected ballots		632		
Unreturned ballots		130		
Turnout		41,934	79.27	▲1.16
Registered electors		52,903		
Majority		6,362	15.46	▲2.47
PAS hold		Swing		
Source(s) "Federal Government Gazette - Notice of Contested Election, Parliament for the State of Kelantan [P.U. (B) 171/2013]" (PDF). Attorney General's Chambers of Malaysia. 26 April 2013. "Federal Government Gazette - Results of Contested Election and Statements of the Poll after the Official Addition of Votes, Parliamentary Constituencies for the State of Kelantan [P.U. (B) 212/2013]" (PDF). Attorney General's Chambers of Malaysia. 22 May 2013. Archived from the original (PDF) on 2019-12-29.

Malaysian general election, 2008
Party	Candidate	Votes	%	∆%
PAS	Siti Zailah Mohd Yusoff	19,344	56.02	▲4.77
BN	Mohd Afandi Yusoff	14,858	43.03	▼5.72
Independent	Isma Airfath Hassanuddin	330	0.95	▲0.95
Total valid votes		34,532	100.00	
Total rejected ballots		837		
Unreturned ballots		82		
Turnout		35,451	78.11	▲4.65
Registered electors		45,384		
Majority		4,486	12.99	▲10.49
PAS hold		Swing		

Malaysian general election, 2004
Party	Candidate	Votes	%	∆%
PAS	Abdul Fatah Harun	15,027	51.25	▼12.63
BN	Mohd Daud Hamat	14,295	48.75	▲12.63
Total valid votes		29,322	100.00	
Total rejected ballots		701		
Unreturned ballots		65		
Turnout		30,088	73.46	▲2.35
Registered electors		40,958		
Majority		732	2.50	▼25.26
PAS hold		Swing		

Malaysian general election, 1999
Party	Candidate	Votes	%	∆%
PAS	Abdul Fatah Harun	19,711	63.88	▲5.85
BN	Wan Mohd Fuaad Wan Abdullah	11,146	36.12	▼5.85
Total valid votes		30,857	100.00	
Total rejected ballots		554		
Unreturned ballots		13		
Turnout		31,424	71.11	▲2.74
Registered electors		44,190		
Majority		8,565	27.76	▲11.70
PAS hold		Swing		

Malaysian general election, 1995
Party	Candidate	Votes	%	∆%
PAS	Daeng Sanusi Daeng Mariok	16,284	58.03	▼3.09
BN	Abdullah Mat Yasim	11,779	41.97	▲3.09
Total valid votes		28,063	100.00	
Total rejected ballots		1,078		
Unreturned ballots		88		
Turnout		29,229	68.37	▼7.20
Registered electors		42,751		
Majority		4,505	16.06	▼6.18
PAS hold		Swing		

Malaysian general election, 1990
Party	Candidate	Votes	%	∆%
PAS	Daeng Sanusi Daeng Mariok	18,618	61.12	▲13.95
BN	Husein Ahmad	11,841	38.88	▼13.95
Total valid votes		30,459	100.00	
Total rejected ballots		614		
Unreturned ballots		0		
Turnout		31,073	75.57	▲1.58
Registered electors		41,118		
Majority		6,777	22.24	▲16.58
PAS gain from BN		Swing		?

Malaysian general election, 1986
Party	Candidate	Votes	%	∆%
BN	Mohamed Yaacob	13,196	52.83	▲3.78
PAS	Mohd Yusof Abdullah	11,784	47.17	▼3.78
Total valid votes		24,980	100.00	
Total rejected ballots		623		
Unreturned ballots		0		
Turnout		25,603	73.99	▼5.15
Registered electors		34,604		
Majority		1,412	5.66	▲3.76
BN gain from National Trust Party (Malaysia)-Malaysian Islamic Party		Swing		?

Malaysian general election, 1982
Party	Candidate	Votes	%	∆%
PAS	Hassan Mohamed	11,145	50.95	▲6.43
BN	Hussein Ahmad	10,728	49.05	▼6.43
Total valid votes		21,873	100.00	
Total rejected ballots		675		
Unreturned ballots		0		
Turnout		22,548	79.14	▲5.08
Registered electors		28,493		
Majority		417	1.90	▼9.06
PAS gain from BN		Swing		?

Malaysian general election, 1978
Party	Candidate	Votes	%	∆%
BN	Ibrahim Muhammad	9,433	55.48	▼22.49
PAS	Zain	7,568	44.52	▲44.52
Total valid votes		17,001	100.00	
Total rejected ballots		186		
Unreturned ballots		0		
Turnout		17,187	74.06	▲2.06
Registered electors		23,207		
Majority		1,865	10.96	▼44.98
BN hold		Swing		

Malaysian general election, 1974
Party	Candidate	Votes	%
BN	Zakaria Ismail	11,826	77.97
Independent	Abdul Rashid Ahmad	3,341	22.03
Total valid votes		15,167	100.00
Total rejected ballots		2,814	
Unreturned ballots		0	
Turnout		17,981	72.00
Registered electors		24,974	
Majority		8,485	55.94
This was a new constituency created.
