= Siti Zailah Mohd Yusoff =

Malaysian politician

Yang Berhormat Dato' Hajah Siti Zailah Mohd Yusoff DJMK JMK SMK MP
- سيتي ظل ﷲ محمد يوسف
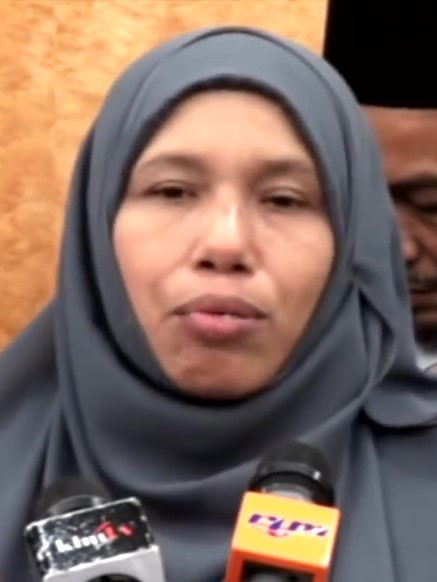
- Siti Zailah in 2018

Deputy Minister of Women, Family and Community Development
- In office 30 August 2021 – 24 November 2022
- Monarch: Abdullah
- Prime Minister: Ismail Sabri Yaakob
- Minister: Rina Harun
- Preceded by: Herself
- Succeeded by: Aiman Athirah Sabu
- Constituency: Rantau Panjang
- In office 10 March 2020 – 16 August 2021
- Monarch: Abdullah
- Prime Minister: Muhyiddin Yassin
- Minister: Rina Harun
- Preceded by: Hannah Yeoh Tseow Suan
- Succeeded by: Herself
- Constituency: Rantau Panjang

Member of the Malaysian Parliament for Rantau Panjang
- Incumbent
- Assumed office 8 March 2008
- Preceded by: Abdul Fatah Harun (PAS)
- Majority: 4,486 (2008); 6,362 (2013); 6,150 (2018); 20,636 (2022)

Faction represented in Dewan Rakyat
- 2008–2020: Malaysian Islamic Party
- 2020–: Perikatan Nasional

Faction represented in Dewan Negara
- 2000–2006: Malaysian Islamic Party

Personal details
- Born: Siti Zailah binti Mohd Yusoff; 12 October 1963 (age 62) Kelantan, Malaysia
- Citizenship: Malaysian
- Party: Malaysian Islamic Party (PAS)
- Other political affiliations: Pakatan Rakyat (PR) (2008–2015); Gagasan Sejahtera (GS) (2016–2020); Perikatan Nasional (PN) (since 2020)
- Occupation: Politician
- Website: sitizailah.blogspot.com
- Siti Zailah Mohd Yusoff on Parliament of Malaysia

Siti Zailah binti Mohd Yusoff (Jawi: سيتي ظل ﷲ بنت محمد يوسف; born 12 October 1963) is a Malaysian politician who has served as the Member of Parliament (MP) for Rantau Panjang since March 2008. She served as the Deputy Minister of Women, Family and Community Development for the second term in the Barisan Nasional (BN) administration under former Prime Minister Ismail Sabri Yaakob and former Minister Rina Harun from August 2021 to the collapse of the BN administration in November 2022 and the first term in the Perikatan Nasional (PN) administration under former Prime Minister Muhyiddin Yassin and former Minister Rina from March 2020 to the collapse of the PN administration in August 2021. She is a member and Women Chief of the Malaysian Islamic Party (PAS), a component party of the PN and formerly Gagasan Sejahtera (GS) as well as Pakatan Rakyat (PR) coalitions.

== Political career ==
She was elected to the Dewan Rakyat, the lower house of the Parliament of Malaysia for Rantau Panjang in the 2008 general election. Before her election she was a Senator for Kelantan, an appointed position. She won the seat again in the 2013 general election.

In 2011, she was elected as the head of PAS Muslimat, the women's wing of PAS. She retained the post in the 2013 party elections.

== Controversies and issues ==
In July 2014, after the shootdown of Malaysia Airlines Flight 17, Siti Zailah stated that in light of the possibility of "Allah's wrath", Malaysia Airlines should stop serving alcohol and revise the dress code of the female flight attendants, and especially so for Muslim females. Empower, the non-governmental organization criticized her statements, accusing them of being "insensitive and irrelevant".

During the COVID-19 outbreak in March 2020, Siti Zailah, the newly appointed deputy minister for women and family development brought up the question of shariah-compliant uniforms at a time when airline staff were facing likely job cuts, resulting from the COVID-19 outbreak causing a worldwide collapse in travel demand, in Parliament. She faced backlash from the National Union of Flight Attendants Malaysia, and from both the public and former Youth and Sports minister YB Syed Saddiq.

Within the same period, she made a post on Twitter, noting that "The fatality rate for COVID-19 is only just 1%, but the chances of us dying at any moment is 100%. Renew our faith and be afraid of Allah, as death is something that is genuine, and comes without invitation". After much blowback on social media, she temporarily closed her Twitter account.

In February 2022, she made an Instagram video telling husbands how to punish their wives for "unruly" behavior. She suggested that a husband should start by communicating and if that fails, he should refuse to sleep with his wife. If the wife still does not change her behavior, Siti recommended husbands beat their wives "gently" and use the “bodily contact method” as punishment. This led to outcries from the women's rights coalition Joint Action Group for Gender Equality and from its members such as Sisters in Islam, the Women's Aid Organization, the Women's Centre for Change, calling for her to step down.

In May 2023, Siti Zailah is being investigated for illegally using water from a fire hydrant for the use of residents in her constituency facing a water shortage due to the 2023 heat wave. While she claimed that she has gotten permission from Air Kelantan Sdn. Bhd. (AKSB) in her Facebook page, Kelantan Fire and Rescue Department director Zainal Madasin said otherwise. Zainal had also checked with AKSB managing director Nazmi Ghazali Azmi and confirmed that neither agency had received any request from Siti Zailah. Zainal and Nazmi have lodged police reports on the issue.

On 24 March 2024, Siti Zailah and her daughter were injured after a car accident along Jalan Bukit Antarabangsa, Ampang Jaya, Selangor. The accident involved a 4WD which they were in and a car. Investigations revealed that it was raining heavily during the time of the accident. The 4WD was maneuvering around a corner when the car, that was traveling in the opposite direction, suddenly entered its path. The 4WD driver was not able to avoid the car and crashed. Siti Zailah and others injured were then hospitalized at the Ampang Hospital for treatment at the emergency room yellow zone. Siti Zailah added that they were ten minutes into their drive to a fast-breaking event in Puchong, Selangor.

== Election results ==
Parliament of Malaysia
Year	Constituency	Candidate	Votes	Pct	Opponent(s)	Votes	Pct	Ballots cast	Majority	Turnout
2008	P023 Rantau Panjang	Siti Zailah Mohd Yusoff (PAS)	19,344	54.57%	Mohd Afandi Yusoff (UMNO)	14,858	41.91%	35,451	4,486	78.11%
2008	P023 Rantau Panjang	Siti Zailah Mohd Yusoff (PAS)	19,344	54.57%	Isma Airfath Hassanuddin (IND)	330	0.93%	35,451	4,486	78.11%
2013	P023 Rantau Panjang	Siti Zailah Mohd Yusoff (PAS)	23,724	56.57%	Ghazali Ismail (UMNO)	17,448	41.61%	41,934	6,362	79.27%
2018	P023 Rantau Panjang	Siti Zailah Mohd Yusoff (PAS)	24,581	50.82%	Abdullah Mat Yasim (UMNO)	18,431	38.10%	49,639	6,150	75.08%
2018	P023 Rantau Panjang	Siti Zailah Mohd Yusoff (PAS)	24,581	50.82%	Wan Shah Jihan Wan Din (AMANAH)	5,361	11.08%	49,639	6,150	75.08%
2022	P023 Rantau Panjang	Siti Zailah Mohd Yusoff (PAS)	37,759	62.38%	Zulkarnain Yusoff (UMNO)	17,123	28.29%	61,406	20,636	64.91%
2022	P023 Rantau Panjang	Siti Zailah Mohd Yusoff (PAS)	37,759	62.38%	Wan Shah Jihan Wan Din (AMANAH)	4,256	7.03%	61,406	20,636	64.91%
2022	P023 Rantau Panjang	Siti Zailah Mohd Yusoff (PAS)	37,759	62.38%	Ibrahim Ali (PUTRA)	1,216	2.01%	61,406	20,636	64.91%
2022	P023 Rantau Panjang	Siti Zailah Mohd Yusoff (PAS)	37,759	62.38%	Mohd Zain Ismail (PRM)	172	0.29%	61,406	20,636	64.91%

== Honours ==
=== Honours of Malaysia ===
- Malaysia
  - Recipient of the 17th Yang di-Pertuan Agong Installation Medal (2024)
- Kelantan
  - Knight Commander of the Order of the Life of the Crown of Kelantan (DJMK) – Dato' (2019)
  - Companion of the Order of the Life of the Crown of Kelantan (JMK) (2011)
  - Recipient of the Crown of Kelantan Decoration (SMK) (2010)

== See also ==
- Rantau Panjang (federal constituency)
