= Opposition (Malaysia) =

Government opposition in Malaysia

The Opposition (Malay: Pembangkang; Jawi: ڤمبڠكڠ) in Malaysia fulfils the same function as the official opposition in other Commonwealth of Nations monarchies. It is seen as the alternative government and the existing administration's main opponent at a general election.

== Federal Parliament ==
This is the list of current Leaders of the Opposition in the Parliament of Malaysia:

House	Opposition Leader	Political party (Note: This column names only the opposition leader's party. The opposition bloc he heads may be a complex coalition of several parties and independents; those are not listed here.)	Term	Government Leader
Dewan Negara	Vacant	N/A	18 July 2018 8 years, 125 days	Vacant
Dewan Rakyat	Hamzah Zainuddin (b. 1957) MP for Larut	PN–WAWASAN	18 June 2026; 160 days	Anwar Ibrahim (b. 1947) MP for Tambun

== State Legislative Assemblies ==
The Leader of the Opposition in Malaysian state politics is a Member of the Legislative Assembly in the Dewan Undangan Negeri (State Legislative Assembly).

In each state, the Leader of the Opposition is the leader of the largest political party in the State Assembly that is not in government except in the Johor State Legislative Assembly.

When in state legislative assembly, the Leader of the Opposition sits on the left-hand side of the centre table, in front of the Opposition and opposite the Menteri Besar/Chief Minister/Premier. The State Opposition Leader is elected by the minority party of the Assembly according to its rules. A new Opposition Leader may be elected when the incumbent dies, resigns, or is challenged for the leadership.

Malaysia is a constitutional monarchy with a parliamentary system and is based on the Westminster model. The Opposition is an important component of the Westminster system, with the Opposition directing criticism at the Government's policies and programs, give close attention to all proposed legislation and attempts to defeat and replace the Government. The Opposition is therefore known as the 'government in waiting' and it is a formal part of the parliamentary system.

This is the list of current Leaders of Opposition in the Legislative Assemblies of the Malaysian states:

Current State Opposition Leaders as of 20 November 2026
State (and Assembly)	Opposition Leader	Political party (Note: This column names only the opposition leader's party. The opposition bloc he heads may be a complex coalition of several parties and independents; those are not listed here.)	Term	Government Leader	Refs
Kedah (15th)	Bau Wong Bau Ek (b. 1967); MLA for Sidam	PH–PKR	26 November 2023; 2 years, 359 days	Muhammad Sanusi Md Nor (b. 1974); MLA for Jeneri	
Kelantan (15th)	Mohd Syahbuddin Hashim (b. unknown); MLA for Galas	BN–UMNO	5 September 2023; 3 years, 76 days	Mohd Nassuruddin Daud (b. 1965); MLA for Meranti	
(Malacca) Melaka (15th)	Kerk Chee Yee (b. 1992); MLA for Ayer Keroh	PH–DAP	13 December 2022; 3 years, 342 days	Ab Rauf Yusoh (b. 1961); MLA for Tanjung Bidara	
Negeri Sembilan (16th)	Arul Kumar Jambunathan (b. 1985); MLA for Nilai	PH–DAP	18 August 2026; 94 days	Ismail Lasim (b. 1960); MLA for Juasseh	
Pahang (15th)	Tuan Ibrahim Tuan Man (b.1960); MLA for Cheka	PN–PAS	6 December 2022; 3 years, 349 days	Wan Rosdy Wan Ismail (b. 1958); MLA for Jelai	
Penang (15th)	Muhammad Fauzi Yusoff (b. unknown); MLA for Sungai Dua	PN–PAS	17 November 2023; 3 years, 3 days	Chow Kon Yeow (b. 1957); MLA for Padang Kota	
Perak (15th)	Razman Zakaria (b. 1960); MLA for Gunong Semanggol	PN–PAS	9 December 2022; 3 years, 346 days	Saarani Mohamad (b.1962); MLA for Kota Tampan	
Perlis (15th)	Gan Ay Ling (b. unknown); MLA for Indera Kayangan	PH–PKR	19 November 2022; 4 years, 1 day	Abu Bakar Hamzah (b. unknown); MLA for Kuala Perlis	
Sabah (15th)	Shafie Apdal (b. 1956); MLA for Senallang	WARISAN	29 September 2020; 6 years, 52 days	Hajiji Noor (b. 1956); MLA for Sulaman	
Sarawak (19th)	Chong Chieng Jen (b. 1971); MLA for Padungan	PH–DAP	19 March 2024; 2 years, 246 days	Abang Abdul Rahman Johari Abang Openg (b. 1949); MLA for Gedong	
Selangor (15th)	Azmin Ali (b. 1964); MLA for Hulu Kelang	BERSATU	19 September 2023; 3 years, 62 days	Amirudin Shari (b. 1980); MLA for Sungai Tua	
Terengganu (15th)	None	None	12 August 2023; 3 years, 100 days	Ahmad Samsuri Mokhtar (b. 1970); MLA for Ru Rendang	

This is the list of current Leader of Balancing Force in the Legislative Assembly of the Malaysian state:

Current State Balancing Force Leader as of 20 November 2026
State (and Assembly)	Balancing Force Leader	Political party (Note: This column names only the balancing force leader's party. The balancing force bloc he heads may be a complex coalition of several parties and independents; those are not listed here.)	Term	Government Leader	Refs
Johor (15th)	Andrew Chen Kah Eng (b. 1975); MLA for Stulang	PH–DAP	20 March 2023; 3 years, 245 days	Onn Hafiz Ghazi (b. 1979); MLA for Machap	
