= Hamzah Zainudin =

Malaysian politician

Yang Berhormat Dato' Seri Hamzah Zainudin SPMP SPDK SSAP DPTJ DPMP PMP KMN JP PPT MP
- حمزة زين الدين
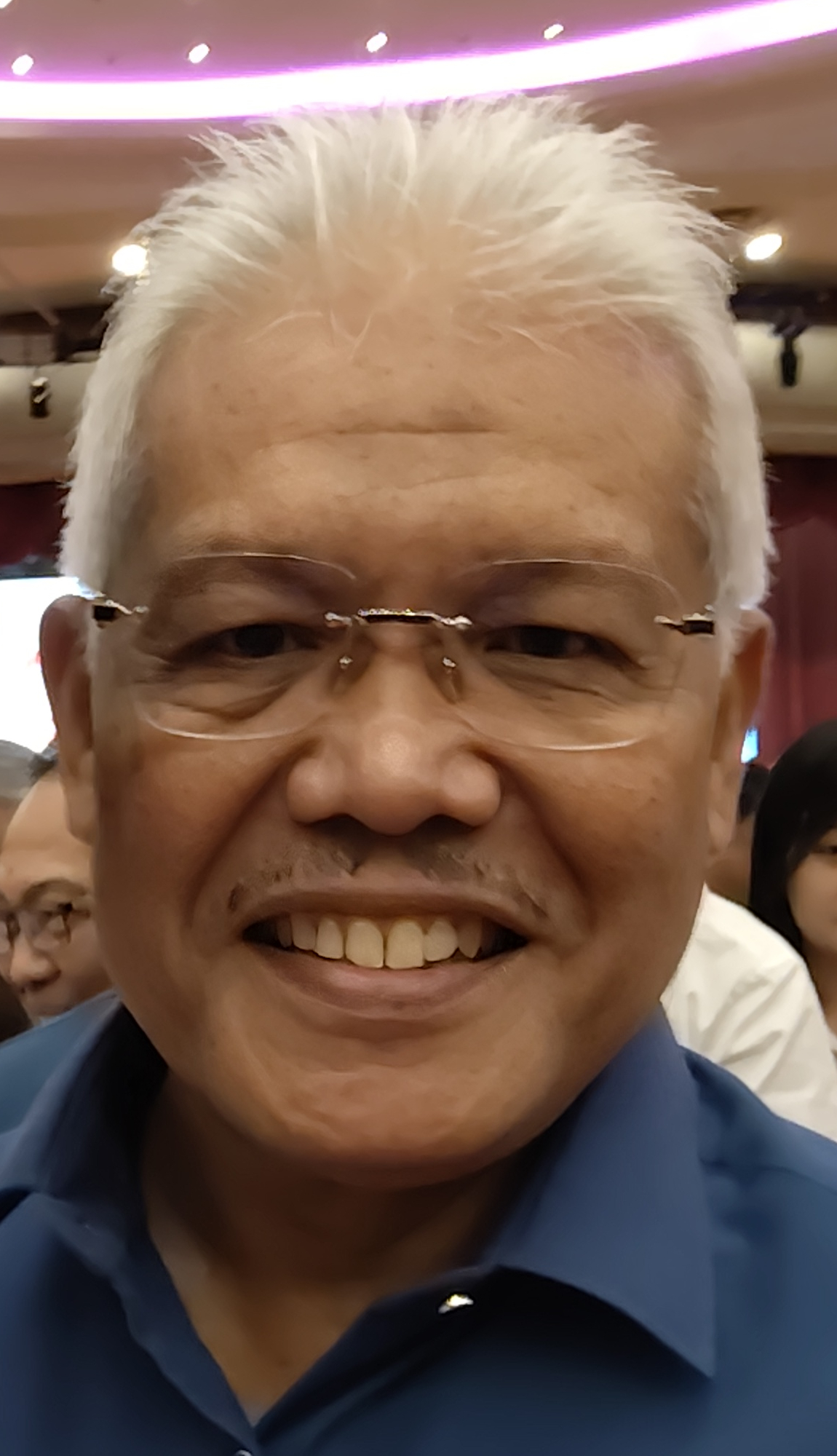
- Hamzah in 2024

17th and 19th Leader of the Opposition
- Incumbent
- Assumed office 13 June 2026
- Monarch: Ibrahim Iskandar
- Prime Minister: Anwar Ibrahim
- Preceded by: Ahmad Samsuri Mokhtar
- Constituency: Larut
- In office 10 December 2022 – 12 April 2026
- Monarchs: Abdullah (2022–2024); Ibrahim Iskandar (2024–2026)
- Prime Minister: Anwar Ibrahim
- Preceded by: Anwar Ibrahim
- Succeeded by: Ahmad Samsuri Mokhtar
- Constituency: Larut
Party offices
President of Parti Wawasan Negara
Incumbent
Assumed office 20 June 2026
Preceded by	Huan Cheng Guan (as President of Love Malaysia Party)
Deputy Chairman of Perikatan Nasional
In office 9 December 2024 – 13 February 2026 Serving with Abdul Hadi Awang & Dominic Lau Hoe Chai & Punithan Paramsiven
Chairman	Muhyiddin Yassin
Preceded by	Ahmad Faizal Azumu
Succeeded by	Muhyiddin Yassin
3rd Deputy President of the Malaysian United Indigenous Party
In office 4 November 2024 – 13 February 2026
President	Muhyiddin Yassin
Preceded by	Ahmad Faizal Azumu
Succeeded by	Radzi Jidin; Ahmad Faizal Azumu (both acting)
1st Secretary-General of Perikatan Nasional
In office 18 March 2020 – 9 December 2024
Chairman	Muhyiddin Yassin
Preceded by	Position established
Succeeded by	Azmin Ali
3rd Secretary-General of the Malaysian United Indigenous Party
In office 18 March 2020 – 28 November 2024
President	Muhyiddin Yassin
Chairman	Muhyiddin Yassin (Acting, February–August 2020)
Preceded by	Marzuki Yahya
Succeeded by	Azmin Ali
Ministerial portfolios
Minister of Home Affairs
In office 30 August 2021 – 24 November 2022
Prime Minister	Ismail Sabri Yaakob
Deputy	Ismail Mohamed Said; Jonathan Yasin
Preceded by	Himself
Succeeded by	Saifuddin Nasution Ismail
In office 10 March 2020 – 16 August 2021
Prime Minister	Muhyiddin Yassin
Deputy	Ismail Mohamed Said; Jonathan Yasin
Preceded by	Muhyiddin Yassin
Succeeded by	Himself
Minister of Domestic Trade, Cooperatives and Consumerism
In office 29 July 2015 – 10 May 2018
Prime Minister	Najib Razak
Deputy	Ahmad Bashah Md Hanipah (2015–2016); Henry Sum Agong (2016–2018)
Preceded by	Hasan Malek
Succeeded by	Saifuddin Nasution Ismail (Minister of Domestic Trade and Consumerism); Mohd Redzuan Md Yusof (Minister of Entrepreneur Development and Cooperatives)
Deputy Minister of Foreign Affairs
In office 16 May 2013 – 29 July 2015
Prime Minister	Najib Razak
Preceded by	A Kohillan Pillay; Richard Riot Jaem
Succeeded by	Reezal Merican Naina Merican
Deputy Minister of Plantation Industries and Commodities
In office 10 April 2009 – 15 May 2013 Serving with G. Palanivel (2010–2011)
Prime Minister	Najib Razak
Preceded by	A Kohillan Pillay
Succeeded by	Noriah Kasnon
Deputy Minister of Housing and Local Government
In office 19 March 2008 – 9 April 2009 Serving with Robert Lau Hoi Chew
Prime Minister	Abdullah Ahmad Badawi
Preceded by	Azizah Mohd Dun
Succeeded by	Lajim Ukin
Parliamentary offices
Member of the Malaysian Parliament for Larut
Incumbent
Assumed office 8 March 2008
Preceded by	Raja Ahmad Zainuddin Raja Omar
Senator Elected by the Perak State Legislative Assembly
In office 8 September 2000 – 16 September 2006
Preceded by	Mustaffa Kamal Mohd. Nawi
Succeeded by	Azlan Osman

Personal details
- Born: Hamzah bin Zainudin; 12 March 1957 (age 69) Perak, Federation of Malaya (now Malaysia)
- Citizenship: Malaysian
- Party: Parti Wawasan Negara (WAWASAN) (2026–present); Malaysian United Indigenous Party (BERSATU) (2019–2026); Independent (2018–2019, 2026); United Malays National Organisation (UMNO) (2000–2018)
- Other political affiliations: Perikatan Nasional (PN) (2020–Present); Pakatan Harapan (PH) (2018–2020); Barisan Nasional (BN) (2000–2018)
- Spouse(s): Noraini Abdul Rashid (m. 1981; div. 1996) Norashikin Abdul Ghani
- Children: 5
- Education: Tuanku Abdul Rahman School
- Alma mater: University of Technology Malaysia (Dip)
- Occupation: Politician
- Awards: Full list
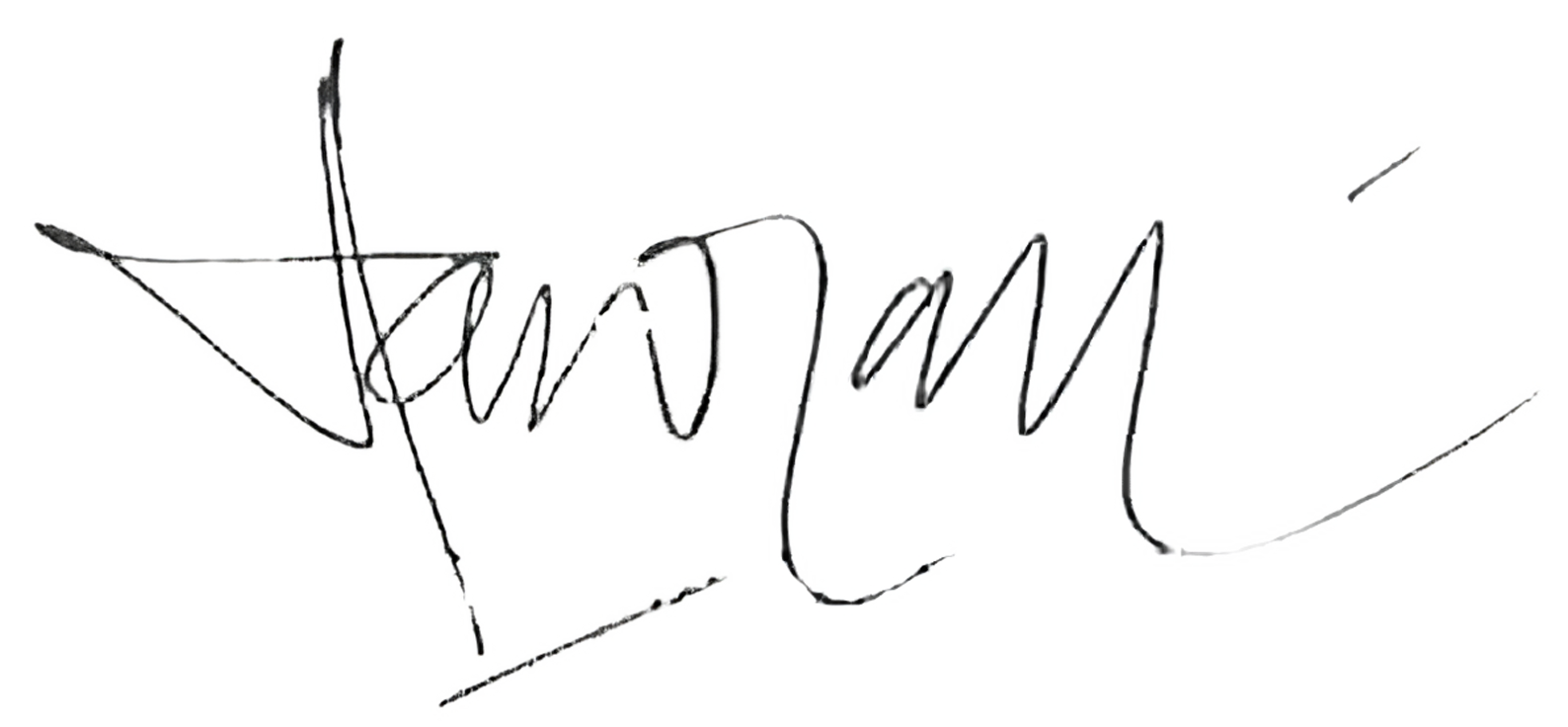
- Signature

Hamzah bin Zainudin (Jawi: حمزة بن زين الدين; born 12 March 1957) is a Malaysian politician who has served as the 19th Leader of the Opposition since June 2026, having previously served in the position from December 2022 to his resignation in April 2026. He has served as the Member of Parliament (MP) for Larut since March 2008. He was a member and the 3rd Deputy President of the Malaysian United Indigenous Party (BERSATU), a component party of the Perikatan Nasional (PN) coalition, where he is served as one of its Deputy Chairmen, until his removal from the party in February 2026. In June 2026, Hamzah launched a new political party, Parti Wawasan Negara, and was re-appointed as Leader of the Opposition.

== Early life and education ==
Hamzah was born on 12 March 1957 in Perak, Federation of Malaya (now Malaysia). He was a student at Sekolah Tuanku Abdul Rahman (STAR). He received his Diploma in Quantity Surveying from University of Technology Malaysia (UTM) in 1975.

== Early career ==
He served as the General Manager with Maju Bangun Sdn Bhd, a subsidiary company of the Perak State Development Corporation from 1980 till 1987. He has also served as a member of the board of Ipoh City Council and Stadium Merdeka Corporation from 1987 to 1993 and 1991 to 1997 respectively. In 1989, he ventured into private business and sat on several companies listed on Bursa Malaysia Securities Berhad (known then as the Kuala Lumpur Stock Exchange). He held various chairman and deputy chairman duties, including chairman of FELCRA Berhad, the Federal Land Consolidation and Rehabilitation Authority that oversees land management and development of agro land owned by the individuals and states.

== Political career ==
He was elected to the House of Representatives in the 2008 election and was appointed a Deputy Minister of Housing and Local Government. He was previously a member of the Malaysian Senate.

He served as the Minister of Domestic Trade, Cooperatives and Consumerism, Deputy Minister of Foreign Affairs, Deputy Minister of Plantation Industries and Commodities and Deputy Minister of Housing and Local Government in the Barisan Nasional (BN) administration under former prime ministers Abdullah Ahmad Badawi and Najib Razak from March 2008 to the defeat of BN in the 2018 general election in May 2018. He has also served as the member of parliament (MP) for Larut since March 2008. Presently he is a member of the Malaysian United Indigenous Party (BERSATU) and its 3rd secretary-general since March 2020, a component party of the ruling PN coalition and he also serves as its 1st secretary-general since August 2020. He was a member of the then-ruling United Malays National Organisation (UMNO), a component party of the BN coalition. He subsequently resigned from UMNO to join BERSATU in December 2018.

In 2020, when the Pakatan Harapan government crumpled due to Mahathir Mohamad's sudden resignation after trying to eradicate those who are involved in the Sheraton Move but failed. He was elected as the Home Minister by the newly appointed Prime Minister Muhyiddin Yassin in his cabinet. He was then retained as the Home Minister in Ismail Sabri cabinet.

In December 2022, he led the Perikatan Nasional coalition to become the 17th Leader of the Opposition. He was later sacked by the disciplinary body of BERSATU on 13 February 2026 over party violations, alongside 16 other members including Wan Ahmad Fayhsal, triggering an internal crisis in BERSATU and takeover of the official Facebook page by alleged pro-Hamzah administrators.

== Controversies and issues ==
=== Divorcing his first wife ===
In 2004, he was asked to pay his first wife Nooraini Rashid RM11.2 million in settlements for allegedly divorcing her to marry a much younger woman. In 2007 however, the Syariah Appeals Court allowed for his appeal to not pay his ex-wife.

=== Allegations against Anwar Ibrahim ===
In August 2008, former best friend and opposition leader Anwar Ibrahim, filed a defamation suit against him seeking RM10 million in damages over Hamzah’s allegations that Anwar had harassed his wife in 1998. Hamzah allegedly made the remark when campaigning during the Permatang Pauh by-election in August 2008, which subsequently saw Anwar’s return to parliament after a 10-year absence.

=== Intervention in PDRM ===
In 2021, he was caught having a phone conversation with the soon-to-retire Inspector-General of Police (IGP) to allow him to internally transfer staffs and also enable him to have over certain jurisdiction of Polis Diraja Malaysia (PDRM) which will indirectly interfere with the operation. At the IGP's last week in office, Abdul Hamid Bador revealed all the dirty tricks of Hamzah trial efforts to interfere with the PDRM and how it will affect the PDRM's reputation. He acknowledged that the voice of the recording was his and stand being corrected as it is not unlawful despite IGP's comment on how politician's interference will make operations hard for the PDRM.

=== Allegation of being an operator ===
Hamzah is widely known in Malaysian politics as an "operator". This was evident during his early years in UMNO, where he was an influential and strategic political operator, renowned for his ability to control narratives and build networks, especially during power transitions. Known to work within the shadows, he played a key role as the architect behind the Sheraton Move that brought down the Pakatan Harapan government.

When I ask a politician, "Who is Hamzah Zainudin?" the first thing I hear is that he's an operator. One of the greatest political operators in history. Operators are people who solve problems behind the scenes. They never surface. For me, you were the Lord of Darkness. You operated in the shadows.

— Khairy Jamaluddin, 2025

== Personal life ==
Hamzah was married to Noraini Abdul Rashid in 1981 before divorcing her in 1996 to marry his second wife, Nurasikin Abdul Ghani. He has 5 children.

== Election results ==
Parliament of Malaysia
Year	Constituency	Candidate	Votes	Pct	Opponent(s)	Votes	Pct	Ballots cast	Majority	Turnout
2008	P056 Larut	Hamzah Zainudin (UMNO)	15,878	53.20%	Mohd Dhari Othman (PAS)	13,967	46.80%	30,589	1,911	77.06%
2013	P056 Larut	Hamzah Zainudin (UMNO)	22,184	56.38%	Mohd Fauzi Shaari (PAS)	16,888	42.92%	40,100	5,296	86.09%
2013	P056 Larut	Hamzah Zainudin (UMNO)	22,184	56.38%	Raveendran Vallikana (IND)	278	0.70%	40,100	5,296	86.09%
2018	P056 Larut	Hamzah Zainudin (UMNO)	18,184	45.90%	Abu Husin Mohammad (PAS)	13,698	34.57%	40,470	4,486	81.84%
2018	P056 Larut	Hamzah Zainudin (UMNO)	18,184	45.90%	Khairil Anuar Akhiruddin (BERSATU)	7,738	19.53%	40,470	4,486	81.84%
2022	P056 Larut	Hamzah Zainudin (BERSATU)	28,350	54.65%	Mohd Shafiq Fhadly Mahmud (UMNO)	16,752	32.29%	51,875	11,598	78.93%
2022	P056 Larut	Hamzah Zainudin (BERSATU)	28,350	54.65%	Zolkarnian Abidin (AMANAH)	6,207	11.97%	51,875	11,598	78.93%
2022	P056 Larut	Hamzah Zainudin (BERSATU)	28,350	54.65%	Awzey Fazlan Sahidi (PEJUANG)	566	1.09%	51,875	11,598	78.93%

== Honours ==
=== Honours of Malaysia ===
- Malaysia
  - Officer of the Order of the Defender of the Realm (KMN) (2000)
  - Recipient of the 17th Yang di-Pertuan Agong Installation Medal (2024)
- Negeri Sembilan
  - Knight Commander of the Order of Tuanku Jaafar (DPTJ) – Dato' (1997)
- Pahang
  - Knight Grand Companion of the Order of Sultan Ahmad Shah of Pahang (SSAP) – Dato' Sri (2021)
- Perak
  - Knight Grand Commander of the Order of the Perak State Crown (SPMP) – Dato' Seri (2015)
  - Knight Commander of the Order of the Perak State Crown (DPMP) – Dato' (2002)
  - Commander of the Order of the Perak State Crown (PMP) (1992)
  - Recipient of the Distinguished Conduct Medal (PPT) (1990)
  - Justice of the Peace (JP) (1996)
- Sabah
  - Grand Commander of the Order of Kinabalu (SPDK) – Datuk Seri Panglima (2020)

== See also ==
- Larut (federal constituency)
- Shadow Cabinet of Hamzah Zainudin
