= Maran (federal constituency) =

Federal constituency of Pahang, Malaysia

Maran (P086)
Pahang constituency

Federal constituency
- Legislature: Dewan Rakyat
- MP: Ismail Muttalib; PN
- Constituency created: 1974
- First contested: 1974
- Last contested: 2022

Demographics
- Population (2020): 61,932
- Electors (2022): 53,128
- Area (km²): 1,609
- Pop. density (per km²): 38.5

Maran is a federal constituency in Maran District, Pahang, Malaysia, that has been represented in the Dewan Rakyat since 1974.

The federal constituency was created in the 1974 redistribution and is mandated to return a single member to the Dewan Rakyat under the first past the post voting system.

== Demographics ==
https://live.chinapress.com.my/ge15/parliament/PAHANG

Ethnic breakdown of Maran's electorate as of 2022
1. Malay (89.3%)
2. Chinese (5.90%)
3. Other ethnicities (3.50%)
4. Indian (1.30%)

As of 2020, Maran has a population of 61,932 people.

Age breakdown of Maran's electorate as of 2022
1. 18-20 (6.19%)
2. 21-29 (19.6%)
3. 30-39 (23.5%)
4. 40-49 (19.6%)
5. 50-59 (14.6%)
6. 60-69 (7.87%)
7. 70-79 (6.22%)
8. 80-89 (2.08%)
9. above 90 (0.25%)
Gender breakdown of Maran's electorate as of 2022
1. Male (49.9%)
2. Female (50.1%)

== History ==
=== Polling districts ===
According to the federal gazette issued on 30 October 2022, the Maran constituency is divided into 33 polling districts.

State constituency	Polling districts	Code	Location
Luit (N24)	Kampung Sri Jaya	086/24/01	SJK (C) Pei Min Sri Jaya
Luit (N24)	Kampung New Zealand	086/24/02	SK LKTP Kampong New Zealand
Luit (N24)	Kampung Luit	086/24/03	SK Ulu Luit
Luit (N24)	Serengkam	086/24/04	SK Serengkam
Luit (N24)	Kuala Wau	086/24/05	SK Kuala Wau
Luit (N24)	Lubuk Paku	086/24/06	Dewan Mini Kampung Lubuk Paku
Luit (N24)	Kampung Senggora	086/24/07	SK Senggora
Luit (N24)	Sri Keramat	086/24/08	SK Sri Keramat
Luit (N24)	Bandar Maran	086/24/09	SK Maran
Luit (N24)	FELDA Bukit Tajau	086/24/10	SK LKTP Bukit Tajau
Luit (N24)	Kampung Sentosa	086/24/11	SK Sentosa
Kuala Sentul (N25)	FELDA Jengka 1	086/25/01	SK LKTP Jengka 1
Kuala Sentul (N25)	Sungai Jerik	086/25/02	SJK (C) Jerik
Kuala Sentul (N25)	Kuala Sentul	086/25/03	SK Kuala Sentul
Kuala Sentul (N25)	FELDA Jengka 5	086/25/04	SK LKTP Jengka 5
Kuala Sentul (N25)	FELDA Jengka 4	086/25/05	SK LKTP Jengka 4
Kuala Sentul (N25)	FELDA Jengka 3	086/25/06	SK LKTP Jengka 3
Kuala Sentul (N25)	FELDA Jengka 2	086/25/07	SK LKTP Jengka 2
Kuala Sentul (N25)	Ulu Jempol	086/25/08	SK LKTP Ulu Jempol
Chenor (N26)	FELDA Jengka 6	086/26/01	SMK LKTP Jengka 6
Chenor (N26)	FELDA Jengka 7	086/26/02	SK LKTP Jengka 7
Chenor (N26)	Paya Pasir	086/26/03	SK Paya Pasir
Chenor (N26)	Pesagi	086/26/04	SK Pesagi
Chenor (N26)	Pejing	086/26/05	Balai Raya Kampung Pejing
Chenor (N26)	Kertau	086/26/06	SK Kertau
Chenor (N26)	Sekara	086/26/07	SK Sekara
Chenor (N26)	Chenor Seberang	086/26/08	SK Chenor
Chenor (N26)	Bandar Chenor	086/26/09	SMK Tengku Ampuan Afzan
Chenor (N26)	Bukit Segumpal	086/26/10	SK Tanjung Perang
Chenor (N26)	FELDA Kampung Awah	086/26/11	SK RKTP Kampung Awah
Chenor (N26)	FELDA Sungai Nerek	082/26/12	SK LKTP Sungai Nerek
Chenor (N26)	Bukit Lada	086/26/13	SK Bukit Lada
Chenor (N26)	Kampung Jengka	086/26/14	SK Jengka Batu 13

=== Representation history ===
Members of Parliament for Maran
Parliament	No	Years	Member	Party	Vote Share
Constituency created from Temerloh, Pekan and Kuantan
4th	P069	1974–1978	Hishamuddin Yahaya (هشام الدين يحي)	BN (UMNO)	12,259; 76.93%
5th	P069	1978–1982	Hishamuddin Yahaya (هشام الدين يحي)	BN (UMNO)	17,549; 71.04%
6th	P069	1982–1986	Mohd Khalil Yaakob (محمد خليل يعقوب)	BN (UMNO)	22,495; 67.42%
7th	P077	1986–1990	Muhammad Abdullah (محمد بن عبدﷲ)	BN (UMNO)	20,658; 73.05%
8th	P077	1990–1995	Muhammad Abdullah (محمد بن عبدﷲ)	BN (UMNO)	24,639; 69.10%
9th	P081	1995–1999	Muhammad Abdullah (محمد بن عبدﷲ)	BN (UMNO)	22,372; 72.88%
10th	P081	1999–2004	Muhammad Abdullah (محمد بن عبدﷲ)	BN (UMNO)	18,259; 55.72%
11th	P086	2004–2008	Ismail Muttalib (إسماعيل بن عبدالمطلب)	BN (UMNO)	15,725; 64.96%
12th	P086	2008–2013	Ismail Muttalib (إسماعيل بن عبدالمطلب)	BN (UMNO)	15,868; 63.23%
13th	P086	2013–2018	Ismail Muttalib (إسماعيل بن عبدالمطلب)	BN (UMNO)	19,249; 60.11%
14th	P086	2018–2022	Ismail Muttalib (إسماعيل بن عبدالمطلب)	BN (UMNO)	16,064; 49.09%
15th	P086	2022–present	Ismail Muttalib (إسماعيل بن عبدالمطلب)	PN (PAS)	19,600; 47.77%

=== State constituency ===
Parliamentary constituency	State constituency						
Parliamentary constituency	1955–59*	1959–1974	1974–1986	1986–1995	1995–2004	2004–2018	2018–present
Maran			Bandar Maran				
Maran				Bukit Tajau			
Maran				Cenur			
Maran			Chenor			Chenor	
Maran					Hulu Jempol		
Maran			Jengka				
Maran						Kuala Sentul	
Maran				Luit			
Maran			Paya Besar				

=== Historical boundaries ===
State Constituency	Area				
State Constituency	1974	1984	1994	2003	2018
Bandar Maran	FELDA Bukit Tajau; FELDA Kampung New Zealand; Kampun Orang Asli Embus; Maran; Sri Jaya				
Bukit Tajau		FELDA Bukit Tajau; FELDA Jengka 1-5; FELDA Ulu Jempol; Kuala Sentul; Sungai Jerik			
Chenor	Chenor; FELDA Jengka 6-7; FELDA Kampung Awah; FELDA Sungai Nerek; Paya Pasir				
Hulu Jempol			FELDA Jengka 1-5; FELDA Ulu Jempol; Kampung Orang Asli Bangas; Kuala Sentul; Sungai Jerik		
Jengka	FELDA Bukit Tajau; FELDA Jengka 1-5; FELDA Jengka 11 & 14; FELDA Jengka 15-21; FELDA Ulu Jempol	Bandar Jengka; FELDA Jengka 11; FELDA Jengka 14; FELDA Jengka 15 - 21; Taman Jengka Impian			
Kuala Sentul				FELDA Jengka 1-5; FELDA Ulu Jempol; Kampung Orang Asli Bangas; Kuala Sentul; Sungai Jerik	
Luit		FELDA Bukit Tajau; FELDA Kampung New Zealand; Kampun Orang Asli Embus; Maran; Sri Jaya			
Paya Besar	Bukit Rangun; FELDA Sungai Panching Selatan; FELDA Sungai Panching Utara; Jaya Gading; Kemunting				

=== Current state assembly members ===
No.	State Constituency	Member	Coalition (Party)
N24	Luit	Mohd Sofian Abd Jalil	PN (PAS)
N25	Kuala Sentul	Jasri Jamaluddin	PN (BERSATU)
N26	Chenor	Mujjibur Rahman Ishak	PN (PAS)

=== Local governments & postcodes ===
No.	State Constituency	Local Government	Postcode
N24	Luit	Maran District Council	26400, 26430, 26440 Bandar Pusat Jengka; 26500 Maran; 28030, 28040 Temerloh; 28100 Chenor
N25	Kuala Sentul	Maran District Council	26400, 26430, 26440 Bandar Pusat Jengka; 26500 Maran; 28030, 28040 Temerloh; 28100 Chenor
N26	Chenor	Maran District Council	26400, 26430, 26440 Bandar Pusat Jengka; 26500 Maran; 28030, 28040 Temerloh; 28100 Chenor

== Election results ==
Malaysian general election, 2022
Party	Candidate	Votes	%	∆%
PN	Ismail Abd Muttalib	19,600	47.77	▲47.77
BN	Shahaniza Shamsuddin	17,779	43.27	▼5.82
PH	Ahmad Shuhor Awang	3,574	8.63	▲8.63
Independent	Muhamad Hafiz Al-Haifz	166	0.40	▲0.40
Total valid votes		41,092	100.00	
Total rejected ballots		422		
Unreturned ballots		151		
Turnout		41,665	77.35	▼3.95
Registered electors		53,128		
Majority		1,821	4.50	▼7.00
PN gain from BN		Swing		?
Source(s) https://lom.agc.gov.my/ilims/upload/portal/akta/outputp/1753278/PUB611_2022.pdf

Malaysian general election, 2018
Party	Candidate	Votes	%	∆%
BN	Ismail Abd. Muttalib	16,064	49.09	▼14.50
PAS	Hasenan Haron	12,301	37.59	▲26.90
PKR	Ahmad Farid Ahmad Nordin	4,360	13.32	▲13.32
Total valid votes		32,725	100.00	
Total rejected ballots		482		
Unreturned ballots		156		
Turnout		33,363	81.30	▼3.91
Registered electors		41,036		
Majority		3,763	11.50	▼8.72
BN hold		Swing		
Source(s) "His Majesty's Government Gazette - Notice of Contested Election, Parliament for the State of Pahang [P.U. (B) 238/2018]" (PDF). Attorney General's Chambers of Malaysia. 3 May 2018. "Federal Government Gazette - Results of Contested Election and Statements of the Poll after the Official Addition of Votes, Parliamentary Constituencies for the State of Pahang [P.U. (B) 312/2018]" (PDF). Attorney General's Chambers of Malaysia. 28 May 2018.

Malaysian general election, 2013
Party	Candidate	Votes	%	∆%
BN	Ismail Abd. Muttalib	19,249	60.11	▼3.12
PAS	Mujibur Rahman Ishak	12,774	39.89	▲3.12
Total valid votes		32,023	100.00	
Total rejected ballots		572		
Unreturned ballots		155		
Turnout		32,750	85.21	▲6.26
Registered electors		38,436		
Majority		6,475	20.22	▼6.24
BN hold		Swing		
Source(s) "Federal Government Gazette - Notice of Contested Election, Parliament for the State of Pahang [P.U. (B) 175/2013]" (PDF). Attorney General's Chambers of Malaysia. 26 April 2013. "Federal Government Gazette - Results of Contested Election and Statements of the Poll after the Official Addition of Votes, Parliamentary Constituencies for the State of Pahang [P.U. (B) 216/2013]" (PDF). Attorney General's Chambers of Malaysia. 22 May 2013. Archived from the original (PDF) on 1 July 2019.

Malaysian general election, 2008
Party	Candidate	Votes	%	∆%
BN	Ismail Abd. Muttalib	15,868	63.23	▼1.73
PAS	Nasrudin Hassan	9,227	36.77	▲1.73
Total valid votes		25,095	100.00	
Total rejected ballots		495		
Unreturned ballots		82		
Turnout		25,672	78.95	▲0.76
Registered electors		32,517		
Majority		6,641	26.46	▼3.46
BN hold		Swing		

Malaysian general election, 2004
Party	Candidate	Votes	%	∆%
BN	Ismail Abd. Muttalib	15,725	64.96	▲9.24
PAS	Tuan Ibrahim Tuan Man	8,483	35.04	▼9.24
Total valid votes		24,208	100.00	
Total rejected ballots		569		
Unreturned ballots		133		
Turnout		24,910	78.19	▲0.31
Registered electors		31,858		
Majority		7,242	29.92	▲18.48
BN hold		Swing		

Malaysian general election, 1999
Party	Candidate	Votes	%	∆%
BN	Muhammad Abdullah	18,259	55.72	▼17.16
PAS	Tengku Puji Tengku Abdul Hamid	14,511	44.28	▲17.16
Total valid votes		32,770	100.00	
Total rejected ballots		609		
Unreturned ballots		104		
Turnout		33,483	77.88	▲1.04
Registered electors		42,993		
Majority		3,748	11.44	▼34.32
BN hold		Swing		

Malaysian general election, 1995
Party	Candidate	Votes	%	∆%
BN	Muhammad Abdullah	22,372	72.88	▲3.78
PAS	Mohamed Rusdi Arif	8,326	27.12	▼3.78
Total valid votes		30,698	100.00	
Total rejected ballots		1,016		
Unreturned ballots		102		
Turnout		31,816	76.84	▼2.95
Registered electors		41,405		
Majority		14,046	45.76	▲7.56
BN hold		Swing		

Malaysian general election, 1990
Party	Candidate	Votes	%	∆%
BN	Muhammad Abdullah	24,639	69.10	▼3.95
PAS	Syed Noh Syed Mohamad	11,019	30.90	▲3.95
Total valid votes		35,658	100.00	
Total rejected ballots		899		
Unreturned ballots		0		
Turnout		36,557	79.79	▼3.69
Registered electors		45,819		
Majority		13,620	38.20	▼26.94
BN hold		Swing		

Malaysian general election, 1986
Party	Candidate	Votes	%	∆%
BN	Muhammad Abdullah	20,658	73.05	▲5.63
PAS	Alwi Abd Hamid	7,623	26.95	▼5.63
Total valid votes		28,281	100.00	
Total rejected ballots		737		
Unreturned ballots		0		
Turnout		29,018	76.10	▼0.57
Registered electors		38,133		
Majority		13,035	46.10	▲11.26
BN hold		Swing		

Malaysian general election, 1982
Party	Candidate	Votes	%	∆%
BN	Mohd Khalil Yaakob	22,495	67.42	▼3.62
PAS	Alwi Abdul Hamid	10,868	32.58	▲8.57
Total valid votes		33,363	100.00	
Total rejected ballots		1,171		
Unreturned ballots		0		
Turnout		34,534	76.67	▼0.76
Registered electors		45,042		
Majority		11,627	34.84	▼12.19
BN hold		Swing		

Malaysian general election, 1978
Party	Candidate	Votes	%	∆%
BN	Hishamuddin Yahaya	17,549	71.04	▼5.89
PAS	Mohd Hashim Hassan	5,930	24.01	▲24.01
Independent	Hamzah Ishak	1,224	4.95	▲4.95
Total valid votes		24,703	100.00	
Total rejected ballots		1,000		
Unreturned ballots		0		
Turnout		25,703	77.43	▲3.58
Registered electors		33,195		
Majority		11,619	47.03	▼6.83
BN hold		Swing		

Malaysian general election, 1974
Party	Candidate	Votes	%
BN	Hishamuddin Yahaya	12,259	76.93
Parti Rakyat Malaysia	Suhaimi Saat	3,677	23.07
Total valid votes		15,936	100.00
Total rejected ballots		732	
Unreturned ballots		0	
Turnout		16,668	73.85
Registered electors		21,326	
Majority		8,582	53.86
This was a new constituency created.
