= Ismail Muttalib =

Malaysian politician

Yang Berhormat Dato' Sri Ismail Abdul Muttalib SSAP DSAP DIMP JMN SAP AAP PPN MP
- إِسْمَاعِيل عَبْدُٱلْمُطَّلِب

Deputy Minister of Housing and Local Government
- In office 30 August 2021 – 24 November 2022
- Monarch: Abdullah
- Prime Minister: Ismail Sabri Yaakob
- Minister: Reezal Merican Naina Merican
- Preceded by: Himself
- Succeeded by: Akmal Nasrullah Mohd Nasir (Deputy Minister of Local Government Development)
- Constituency: Maran
- In office 10 March 2020 – 16 August 2021
- Monarch: Abdullah
- Prime Minister: Muhyiddin Yassin
- Minister: Zuraida Kamaruddin
- Preceded by: Raja Kamarul Bahrin Shah Raja Ahmad
- Succeeded by: Himself
- Constituency: Maran

Deputy Minister of Human Resources
- In office 16 May 2013 – 10 May 2018
- Monarchs: Abdul Halim (2013–2016); Muhammad V (2016–2018)
- Prime Minister: Najib Razak
- Minister: Richard Riot Jaem
- Preceded by: Maznah Mazlan
- Succeeded by: Mahfuz Omar
- Constituency: Maran

Member of the Malaysian Parliament for Maran
- Incumbent
- Assumed office 21 March 2004
- Preceded by: Muhammad Abdullah (BN–UMNO)
- Majority: 7,242 (2004); 6,641 (2008); 6,475 (2013); 3,763 (2018); 1,821 (2022)

Faction represented in Dewan Rakyat
- 2004–2022: Barisan Nasional
- 2022–: Perikatan Nasional

Personal details
- Born: Ismail bin Abdul Muttalib; 1 December 1954 (age 71) Pahang, Federation of Malaya (now Malaysia)
- Party: United Malays National Organisation (UMNO) (–2022); Malaysian Islamic Party (PAS) (since 2022)
- Other political affiliations: Barisan Nasional (BN) (–2022); Perikatan Nasional (PN) (since 2022)
- Spouse: Fatimah Kassim
- Occupation: Politician

Ismail bin Abdul Muttalib (Jawi: إِسْمَاعِيل عَبْدُٱلْمُطَّلِب born 1 December 1954) is a Malaysian politician who has served as the Member of Parliament (MP) for Maran since March 2004. He served as the Deputy Minister of Housing and Local Government for the second term in the Barisan Nasional (BN) administration under former Prime Minister Ismail Sabri Yaakob and former Minister Reezal Merican Naina Merican from August 2021 to the collapse of the BN administration in November 2022 and the first term in the Perikatan Nasional (PN) administration under former Prime Minister Muhyiddin Yassin and former Minister Zuraida Kamaruddin from March 2020 to the collapse of the PN administration in August 2021. He is a member of the Malaysian Islamic Party (PAS), a component party of the PN coalition and was a member of the United Malays National Organisation (UMNO), a component party of the BN coalition.

Ismail was elected to Parliament in the 2004 general election and was re-elected thrice in 2008 general election, 2013 general election and 2018 general election. After the 2013 Malaysian general election, he was appointed to serve as the Deputy Minister of Human Resources in the BN administration from May 2013 to May 2018 for almost 5 years.

On 13 September 2019, the High Court in Kuala Lumpur allowed the Malaysian Anti-Corruption Commission (MACC) to forfeit a total of RM369,662 from Ismail Muttalib and the company Naza Quest Auto in relation to the 1MDB-linked forfeiture suits against them. Ismail did not contest the forfeiture suit.

On 3 November 2022, Ismail Muttalib was re-elected to the seat in the 15th general election under the PN ticket.

== Election results ==
Parliament of Malaysia
Year	Constituency	Candidate	Votes	Pct	Opponent(s)	Votes	Pct	Ballots cast	Majority	Turnout
2004	P086 Maran	Ismail Abdul Muttalib (UMNO)	15,725	64.96%	Tuan Ibrahim Tuan Man (PAS)	8,483	35.04%	24,910	7,242	78.19%
2008	P086 Maran	Ismail Abdul Muttalib (UMNO)	15,868	63.23%	Nasrudin Hassan (PAS)	9,227	36.77%	25,672	6,641	78.95%
2013	P086 Maran	Ismail Abdul Muttalib (UMNO)	19,249	60.11%	Mujibur Rahman Ishak (PAS)	12,774	39.89%	32,750	6,475	85.21%
2018	P086 Maran	Ismail Abdul Muttalib (UMNO)	16,064	49.09%	Hasenan Haron (PAS)	12,301	37.59%	33,363	3,763	81.30%
2018	P086 Maran	Ismail Abdul Muttalib (UMNO)	16,064	49.09%	Ahmad Farid Ahmad Nordin (BERSATU)	4,360	13.32%	33,363	3,763	81.30%
2022	P086 Maran	Ismail Abdul Muttalib (PAS)	19,600	47.70%	Shahaniza Shamsuddin (UMNO)	17,779	43.27%	41,665	1,821	77.35%
2022	P086 Maran	Ismail Abdul Muttalib (PAS)	19,600	47.70%	Ahmad Shuhor Awang (AMANAH)	3,547	8.63%	41,665	1,821	77.35%
2022	P086 Maran	Ismail Abdul Muttalib (PAS)	19,600	47.70%	Muhammad Hafiz Al-Hafiz (IND)	166	0.40%	41,665	1,821	77.35%

== Honours ==
=== Honours of Malaysia ===
- Malaysia
  - Companion of the Order of the Defender of the Realm (JMN) (2013)
  - Medal of the Order of the Defender of the Realm (PPN) (2004)
  - Recipient of the 17th Yang di-Pertuan Agong Installation Medal (2024)
- Pahang
  - Knight Grand Companion of the Order of Sultan Ahmad Shah of Pahang (SSAP) – Dato' Sri (2015)
  - Knight Companion of the Order of Sultan Ahmad Shah of Pahang (DSAP) – Dato' (2013)
  - Knight Companion of the Order of the Crown of Pahang (DIMP) – Dato' (2005)
  - Member of the Order of Sultan Ahmad Shah of Pahang (AAP)
  - Member of Order of the Crown of Pahang (AMP)
  - Recipient of the Distinguished Service Medal (PKC)

== See also ==
- Maran (federal constituency)
