= Members of the Dewan Rakyat, 11th Malaysian Parliament =

11th Parliament of Malaysia
←	10th Parliament	12th Parliament	→

Overview
- Legislative body: Parliament of Malaysia
- Jurisdiction: Malaysia
- Meeting place: Malaysian Houses of Parliament
- Term: 17 May 2004 – 13 February 2008
- Election: 2004 general election
- Government: Second Abdullah cabinet
- Website: www.parlimen.gov.my

Dewan Rakyat
- Members: 219
- Speaker: Mohamed Zahir Ismail (until 14 October 2004); Ramli Ngah Talib
- Deputy Speaker: Lim Si Cheng; Yusof Yacob
- Secretary: Abdullah Abdul Wahab (until 15 August 2006); Mahmood Adam (until 20 December 2007); Roosme Hamzah
- Prime Minister: Abdullah Ahmad Badawi
- Leader of the Opposition: Lim Kit Siang
- Party control: Barisan Nasional

Sovereign
- Yang di-Pertuan Agong: Tuanku Syed Sirajuddin (until 12 December 2006); Tuanku Mizan Zainal Abidin

Sessions
- 1st: 17 May 2004 – 18 January 2005
- 2nd: 21 March 2005 – 8 December 2005
- 3rd: 13 March 2006 – 13 December 2006
- 4th: 19 March 2007 – 19 December 2007

This is a list of the members of the Dewan Rakyat (House of Representatives) of the 11th Parliament of Malaysia, elected in 2004.

== Composition ==
Beginning of the 11th Parliament of Malaysia 17 May 2004
State and federal territories	# of seats	BN seats	DAP seats	PKR seats	PAS seats	Others seats
Perlis	3	3	0	0	0	0
Kedah	15	14	0	0	1	0
Kelantan	14	8	0	0	6	0
Terengganu	8	8	0	0	0	0
Penang	13	8	4	1	0	0
Perak	24	21	3	0	0	0
Pahang	14	14	0	0	0	0
Selangor	22	22	0	0	0	0
Kuala Lumpur	11	7	4	0	0	0
Putrajaya	1	1	0	0	0	0
Negeri Sembilan	8	8	0	0	0	0
Malacca	6	6	0	0	0	0
Johor	26	26	0	0	0	0
Labuan	1	1	0	0	0	0
Sabah	25	24	0	0	0	1 List: Independent (1)
Sarawak	28	27	1	0	0	0
Total	219	198	12	1	7	1

Dissolution of the 11th Parliament of Malaysia 13 February 2008
State and federal territories	# of seats	BN seats	DAP seats	PKR seats	PAS seats	Others seats
Perlis	3	3	0	0	0	0
Kedah	15	14	0	0	1	0
Kelantan	14	9	0	0	5	0
Terengganu	8	8	0	0	0	0
Penang	13	8	4	1	0	0
Perak	24	21	3	0	0	0
Pahang	14	14	0	0	0	0
Selangor	22	22	0	0	0	0
Kuala Lumpur	11	7	4	0	0	0
Putrajaya	1	1	0	0	0	0
Negeri Sembilan	8	8	0	0	0	0
Malacca	6	6	0	0	0	0
Johor	26	26	0	0	0	0
Labuan	1	1	0	0	0	0
Sabah	25	24	0	0	0	1 List: Independent (1)
Sarawak	28	27	1	0	0	0
Total	219	199	12	1	6	1

=== Election pendulum ===
The 11th General Election witnessed 198 governmental seats and 21 non-governmental seats filled the Dewan Rakyat. The government side has 134 safe seats and 22 fairly safe seats, while the other side has 3 safe seats and 4 fairly safe seats. In addition, 17 seats was win uncontested in governmental seats.

GOVERNMENT SEATS
Marginal
Ranau	Bernard Giluk Dompok	UPKO	40.52
Taiping	M. Kayveas	myPPP	47.41
Marang	Abdul Rahman Bakar	UMNO	50.15
Kota Melaka	Wong Nai Chee	MCA	50.18
Machang	Sazmi Miah	UMNO	50.19
Sik	Wan Azmi Wan Ariffin	UMNO	50.52
Pensiangan	Bernard S. Maraat	PBRS	51.05
Kuala Terengganu	Razali Ismail	UMNO	51.61
Bachok	Dr. Awang Adek Hussin	UMNO	51.74
Kota Bharu	Mohd. Zaid Ibrahim	UMNO	51.88
Jerlun	Abdul Rahman Ariffin	UMNO	52.97
Kuala Krai	Mohamed Razali Che Mamat	UMNO	53.37
Puchong	Lau Yeng Peng	GERAKAN	53.38
Baling	Dr. Mashitah Ibrahim	UMNO	53.46
Batu Kawan	Huan Cheng Guan	GERAKAN	53.85
Ketereh	Md. Alwi Che Ahmad	UMNO	53.89
Padang Terap	Ghazali Ibrahim	UMNO	53.97
Tanah Merah	Ir. Shaari Hassan	UMNO	54.26
Sibu	Robert Lau Hoi Chew	SUPP	54.43
Kuala Nerus	Che Azmi Abd. Rahman	UMNO	54.43
Rasah	Goh Siow Huat	MCA	55.02
Dungun	Rosli Mat Hassan	UMNO	55.11
Arau	Syed Razlan Syed Putra Jamallullail	UMNO	55.15
Kota Raja	Vigneswaran M. Sanasee	MIC	55.25
Telok Intan	Mah Siew Keong	GERAKAN	55.78
Fairly safe
Kudat	Abd Rahim Bakri	UMNO	56.91
Parit Buntar	Abdul Hamid Zainal Abidin	UMNO	56.91
Pokok Sena	Abdul Rahman Ibrahim	UMNO	57.00
Mas Gading	Dr. Tiki Lafe	SPDP	57.35
Kuala Kedah	Hashim Jahaya	UMNO	58.08
Bagan Serai	Zainal Abidin Zin	UMNO	58.25
Bera	Ismail Sabri Yaakob	UMNO	58.26
Beruas	Lim Keng Yaik	GERAKAN	58.40
Lubok Antu	Jawah Gerang	PRS	58.56
Jelutong	Lee Kah Choon	GERAKAN	58.79
Tenom	Raime Unggi	UMNO	58.80
Setiu	Mohd. Yusop Majid	UMNO	58.88
Kota Marudu	Dr. Maximus Johnity Ongkili	PBS	59.00
Lanang	Tiong Thai King	SUPP	59.42
Nibong Tebal	Zainal Abidin Osman	UMNO	59.49
Kanowit	Aaron Ago Dagang	PRS	59.51
Julau	Joseph Salang Gandum	PRS	59.54
Besut	Prof. Dr. Abdullah Md. Zin	UMNO	59.73
Hulu Terengganu	Tengku Putera Tengku Awang	UMNO	59.73
Serdang	Yap Pian Hon	MCA	59.77
Kapar	Komala Devi M. Perumal	MIC	59.93
Gombak	Dr. Rahman Ismail	UMNO	59.93
Safe
Jerai	Badruddin Amiruldin	UMNO	60.43
Kulim-Bandar Baharu	Abdul Kadir Sheikh Fadzir	UMNO	60.77
Stampin	Yong Khoon Seng	SUPP	61.18
Parit	Nasarudin Hashim	UMNO	61.22
Bukit Bendera	Chia Kwang Chye	GERAKAN	61.69
Bukit Gantang	Tan Lian Hoe	GERAKAN	61.79
Sabak Bernam	Mat Yasir Ikhsan	UMNO	61.99
Petaling Jaya Utara	Chew Mei Fun	MCA	62.16
Sungai Siput	Samy Vellu S. Sangalimuthu	MIC	62.19
Padang Serai	Lim Bee Kau	MCA	62.22
Jerantut	Tengku Azlan Sultan Abu Bakar	UMNO	62.35
Larut	Raja Ahmad Zainuddin Raja Omar	UMNO	62.46
Batu	Ng Lip Yong	GERAKAN	62.54
Kampar	Hew See Tong	MCA	62.91
Klang	Dr. Tan Yee Kew	MCA	63.02
Shah Alam	Ab. Aziz Shamsuddin	UMNO	63.04
Lumut	Kong Cho Ha	MCA	63.44
Kuantan	Fu Ah Kiow	MCA	63.65
Bintulu	Tiong King Sing	SPDP	63.67
Jeli	Mustapa Mohamed	UMNO	63.84
Kemaman	Ahmad Shabery Cheek	UMNO	63.89
Segamat	Dr. Subramaniam Sathasivam	MIC	63.90
Baram	Jacob Dungau Sagan	SPDP	64.03
Wangsa Maju	Yew Teong Lock	MCA	64.11
Pasir Salak	Ramli Ngah Talib	UMNO	64.11
Seremban	Hon Choon Kim	MCA	64.28
Sri Aman	Jimmy Donald Lim	PRS	64.57
Kota Kinabalu	Yee Moh Chai	PBS	64.82
Kuala Krau	Dr. Ismail Mohamed Said	UMNO	64.89
Selangau	Joseph Entulu Belaun	PRS	64.90
Kota Belud	Salleh Said Keruak	UMNO	64.93
Maran	Dr. Ismail Abdul Muttalib	UMNO	64.96
Tasek Gelugor	Mohd. Shariff Omar	UMNO	65.05
Subang	Karnail Singh Nijhar Amar Singh	MIC	65.33
Raub	Dr. Ng Yen Yen	MCA	65.63
Kuala Kangsar	Rafidah Aziz	UMNO	65.73
Padang Rengas	Mohamed Nazri Abdul Aziz	UMNO	65.74
Sungai Besar	Noriah Kasnon	UMNO	65.75
Kepala Batas	Abdullah Ahmad Badawi	UMNO	65.78
Rompin	Dr. Jamaluddin Mohd. Jarjis	UMNO	65.92
Sungai Petani	Mahadzir Mohd. Khir	UMNO	66.02
Gua Musang	Tengku Razaleigh Tengku Mohd. Hamzah	UMNO	66.06
Gopeng	Ting Chew Peh	MCA	66.12
Tuaran	Wilfred Madius Tangau	UPKO	66.21
Padang Besar	Azmi Khalid	UMNO	66.92
Tanjong Karang	Noh Omar	UMNO	67.00
Alor Star	Chor Chee Heung	MCA	67.18
Temerloh	Mohd. Sarit Yusoh	UMNO	67.19
Kubang Pasu	Mohd. Johari Baharum	UMNO	67.31
Lenggong	Khamsiyah Yeop	UMNO	67.37
Titiwangsa	Astaman Abdul Aziz	UMNO	67.37
Hulu Selangor	Palanivel K. Govindasamy	MIC	67.61
Merbok	Zainuddin Maidin	UMNO	67.64
Bandar Tun Razak	Tan Chai Ho	MCA	67.91
Hulu Rajang	Billy Abit Joo	PRS	67.91
Pandan	Ong Tee Keat	MCA	67.94
Kimanis	Anifah Aman	UMNO	67.98
Tambun	Ahmad Husni Mohamed Hanadzlah	UMNO	68.75
Lipis	Dr. Mohamad Shahrum Osman	UMNO	68.95
Hulu Langat	Markiman Kobiran	UMNO	69.27
Kangar	Mohd. Radzi Sheikh Ahmad	UMNO	69.34
Kulai	Lim Si Cheng	MCA	69.55
Indera Mahkota	Adnan Wan Mamat	UMNO	69.69
Tapah	Veerasingam Suppiah	MIC	69.72
Kluang	Hoo Seong Chang	MCA	69.76
Putatan	Dr. Makin @ Marcus Mojigoh	UPKO	69.78
Lembah Pantai	Shahrizat Abdul Jalil	UMNO	70.30
Sarikei	Law Hieng Ding	SUPP	70.70
Mambong	Dr. James Dawos Mamit	PBB	71.02
Ampang	Rozaidah Talib	UMNO	71.13
Kelana Jaya	Loh Seng Kok	MCA	71.52
Kuala Pilah	Hassan Malek	UMNO	71.61
Segambut	Dr. Tan Kee Kwong	GERAKAN	71.67
Tanjong Malim	Loke Yuen Yow	MCA	71.69
Petaling Jaya Selatan	Donald Lim Siang Chai	MCA	71.99
Paya Besar	Dr. Siti Zaharah Sulaiman	UMNO	72.02
Cameron Highlands	Devamany S. Krishnasamy	MIC	72.05
Sepang	Mohd. Zin Mohamed	UMNO	72.07
Balik Pulau	Dr. Hilmi Yahaya	UMNO	72.08
Bentong	Liow Tiong Lai	MCA	72.48
Kuala Selangor	Mohd. Daud Tarihep	UMNO	72.51
Telok Kemang	Sothinathan Sinna Goundar	MIC	72.67
Saratok	Jelaing Mersat	SPDP	72.94
Kuala Langat	Shafie Mohd. Salleh	UMNO	72.99
Muar	Razali Ibrahim	UMNO	73.28
Parit Sulong	Syed Hood Syed Edros	UMNO	73.37
Selayang	Chan Kong Choy	MCA	73.48
Bayan Baru	Wong Kam Hoong	MCA	73.56
Silam	Samsu Baharun Abd. Rahman	UMNO	73.91
Jempol	Mohd. Isa Abdul Samad	UMNO	73.96
Bakri	Chua Jui Meng	MCA	74.08
Rembau	Firdaus Harun	UMNO	74.12
Labis	Chua Soi Lek	MCA	74.15
Langkawi	Abu Bakar Taib	UMNO	74.21
Gerik	Wan Hashim Wan Teh	UMNO	74.92
Penampang	Donald Peter Mojuntin	UPKO	75.44
Jasin	Mohammad Said Yusof	UMNO	75.98
Sepanggar	Eric E. Majimbun	SAPP	76.09
Semporna	Mohd. Shafie Apdal	UMNO	76.25
Bukit Katil	Mohd. Ruddin Ab. Ghani	UMNO	76.34
Serian	Richard Riot Jaem	SUPP	76.60
Ledang	Ir. Hamim Samuri	UMNO	76.91
Petra Jaya	Fadillah Yusof	PBB	77.09
Setiawangsa	Zulhasnan Rafique	UMNO	77.44
Labuan	Suhaili Abdul Rahman	UMNO	77.68
Jelebu	Dr. Rais Yatim	UMNO	77.87
Pekan	Mohd. Najib Abdul Razak	UMNO	77.96
Bagan Datok	Dr. Ahmad Zahid Hamidi	UMNO	79.08
Tangga Batu	Ir. Idris Haron	UMNO	79.36
Simpang Renggam	Kerk Choo Ting	GERAKAN	79.69
Batu Pahat	Junaidy Abd. Wahab	UMNO	79.78
Sri Gading	Mohamad Aziz	UMNO	80.18
Alor Gajah	Dr. Fong Chan Onn	MCA	80.23
Tampin	Shaziman Abu Mansor	UMNO	80.35
Sekijang	Baharum Mohamed	UMNO	80.40
Mersing	Dr. Abd. Latiff Ahmad	UMNO	80.52
Masjid Tanah	Abu Seman Yusop	UMNO	80.69
Gelang Patah	Tan Ah Eng	MCA	81.45
Mukah	Leo Michael Toyad	PBB	81.69
Ayer Hitam	Ir. Dr. Wee Ka Siong	MCA	82.34
Pagoh	Muhyiddin Mohd. Yassin	UMNO	82.76
Pontian	Ir. Hasni Mohammad	UMNO	82.88
Tebrau	Teng Boon Soon	MCA	84.11
Libaran	Juslie Ajirol	UMNO	84.17
Pasir Gudang	Mohamed Khaled Nordin	UMNO	84.48
Pulai	Nur Jazlan Mohamed	UMNO	85.01
Betong	Douglas Uggah Embas	PBB	85.98
Santubong	Dr. Wan Junaidi Tuanku Jaafar	PBB	86.11
Tanjong Piai	Ong Ka Ting	MCA	86.36
Johor Bahru	Shahrir Abd Samad	UMNO	88.13
Tenggara	Dr. Adham Baba	UMNO	88.27
Sembrong	Hishammuddin Hussein	UMNO	88.29
Putrajaya	Tengku Adnan Tengku Mansor	UMNO	88.33
Batang Sadong	Adenan Satem	PBB	91.23
*Win uncontested
Kota Tinggi	Syed Hamid Syed Jaafar Albar	UMNO	n/a
Miri	Peter Chin Fah Kui	SUPP	n/a
Pengerang	Azalina Othman Said	UMNO	n/a
Beaufort	Azizah Mohd. Dun	UMNO	n/a
Batang Lupar	Rohani Abdul Karim	PBB	n/a
Sipitang	Dr. Yusof Yacob	UMNO	n/a
Kota Samarahan	Abdul Taib Mahmud	PBB	n/a
Keningau	Joseph Pairin Kitingan	PBS	n/a
Kinabatangan	Bung Moktar Radin	UMNO	n/a
Kapit	Alexander Nanta Linggi	PBB	n/a
Beluran	Dr. Ronald Kiandee	UMNO	n/a
Tawau	Shim Paw Fatt	SAPP	n/a
Bukit Mas	Henry Sum Agong	PBB	n/a
Kuala Rajang	A. Wahab Dolah	PBB	n/a
Papar	Rosnah Abdul Rashid Shirlin	UMNO	n/a
Kalabakan	Abdul Ghapur Salleh	UMNO	n/a
Batu Sapi	Edmund Chong Ket Wah	PBS	n/a

NON-GOVERNMENT SEATS
Marginal
Pasir Mas	Ismail Noh	PAS	43.82
Bukit Bintang	Fong Kui Lun	DAP	48.80
Pendang	Dr. Mohd. Hayati Othman	PAS	50.05
Ipoh Barat	Kulasegaran V. Murugeson	DAP	50.66
Permatang Pauh	Dr. Wan Azizah Wan Ismail	KEADILAN	50.69
Rantau Panjang	Abdul Fatah Harun	PAS	51.25
Bukit Gelugor	Karpal Singh Ram Singh	DAP	51.44
Tumpat	Kamarudin Jaffar	PAS	51.68
Kepong	Dr. Tan Seng Giaw	DAP	52.07
Sandakan	Chong Hon Min	IND	52.15
Bandar Kuching	Chong Chieng Jen	DAP	53.02
Pasir Puteh	Kalthom Othman	PAS	53.79
Bagan	Lim Hock Seng	DAP	54.25
Tanjong	Chow Kon Yeow	DAP	55.41
Fairly safe
Kubang Kerian	Salahuddin Ayub	PAS	57.56
Batu Gajah	Fong Po Kuan	DAP	58.09
Pengkalan Chepa	Abdul Halim Abdul Rahman	PAS	58.88
Bukit Mertajam	Chong Eng	DAP	59.76
Safe
Ipoh Timor	Lim Kit Siang	DAP	60.20
Seputeh	Teresa Kok Suh Sim	DAP	62.05
Cheras	Tan Kok Wai	DAP	62.82

== Seating arrangement ==
This is the seating arrangement as of its last meeting on 19 December 2007. None of any seats is labelled as Vacant.

Vacant	Vacant	Vacant	Vacant	Vacant	Vacant	Vacant	Vacant	Vacant	Vacant	Vacant	Vacant	Vacant	Vacant	Vacant	Vacant	Vacant	Vacant	Vacant
Vacant	P206 Kuala Rajang	P031 Kuala Krai	P090 Bera	P086 Maran	P027 Tanah Merah	P013 Sik	P147 Parit Sulong	P009 Alor Setar	P117 Segambut	P077 Tanjong Malim	P004 Langkawi	P092 Sabak Bernam	P034 Setiu	P161 Pulai	P087 Kuala Krau	P036 Kuala Terengganu	P010 Kuala Kedah	Vacant
	P170 Tuaran	P219 Bukit Mas	P184 Libaran	P190 Tawau	P198 Mambong	P166 Labuan	P139 Jasin	P151 Simpang Renggam	P169 Kota Belud	P057 Parit Buntar	P015 Sungai Petani	P038 Hulu Terengganu	P188 Silam (Parliamentary Secretary)	P093 Sungai Besar (Parliamentary Secretary)	P111 Kota Raja (Parliamentary Secretary)	P050 Jelutong (Parliamentary Secretary)	P008 Pokok Sena (Parliamentary Secretary)
	P104 Kelana Jaya		P107 Subang	P130 Rasah	P149 Sri Gading	P187 Kinabatangan	P056 Larut	P084 Paya Besar	P207 Sarikei	P071 Gopeng	P109 Kapar (Parliamentary Secretary)	P029 Machang (Parliamentary Secretary)	P201 Batang Lupar (Parliamentary Secretary)	P040 Kemaman (Parliamentary Secretary)	P110 Klang (Parliamentary Secretary)		P155 Tenggara (Parliamentary Secretary)
	P194 Petra Jaya	P214 Kapit		P199 Serian	P215 Hulu Rajang	P210 Lanang	P088 Temerloh	P212 Mukah	P200 Batang Sadong	P112 Kuala Langat	P089 Bentong (Deputy Minister)	P115 Batu (Deputy Minister)	P047 Nibong Tebal (Deputy Minister)	P134 Masjid Tanah (Deputy Minister)		P196 Stampin (Parliamentary Secretary)	Senator (Parliamentary Secretary)
	P205 Saratok	P216 Bintulu	P203 Lubok Antu				P160 Johor Bahru	P127 Jempol	P018 Kulim-Bandar Baharu	P180 Keningau	P177 Beaufort (Deputy Minister)				P006 Kubang Pasu (Deputy Minister)	P140 Segamat (Parliamentary Secretary)	P116 Wangsa Maju (Parliamentary Secretary)
	P209 Kanowit	P183 Beluran	P070 Kampar			P193 Santubong		P145 Bakri	P197 Kota Samarahan	P032 Gua Musang		P133 Tampin (Deputy Minister)			P213 Selangau (Deputy Minister)	P053 Balik Pulau (Parliamentary Secretary)	P152 Kluang (Parliamentary Secretary)
	P171 Sepanggar	P167 Kudat	P202 Sri Aman		P102 Serdang			E					P113 Sepang (Deputy Minister)		P025 Bachok (Deputy Minister)	P016 Baling (Parliamentary Secretary)	P137 Bukit Katil (Parliamentary Secretary)
	P173 Putatan	P172 Kota Kinabalu	P218 Baram	P017 Padang Serai			F				D			P076 Telok Intan (Deputy Minister)	P037 Marang (Deputy Minister)	Senator (Deputy Minister)	P106 Petaling Jaya Utara (Parliamentary Secretary)
	P078 Cameron Highlands	P182 Pensiangan	P099 Ampang	P162 Gelang Patah	P175 Papar	G						C	P001 Padang Besar (Minister)	P002 Kangar (Minister)	P094 Hulu Selangor (Deputy Minister)	P095 Tanjong Karang (Deputy Minister)	P074 Lumut (Deputy Minister)
	P148 Ayer Hitam	P082 Indera Mahkota	P035 Kuala Nerus	P158 Tebrau	P039 Dungun	G			Sergeant-at-Arm			C	P061 Padang Rengas (Minister)	P030 Jeli (Minister)	P124 Bandar Tun Razak (Deputy Minister)	P083 Kuantan (Deputy Minister)	P208 Julau (Deputy Minister)
	P079 Lipis	P096 Kuala Selangor	P129 Kuala Pilah	P119 Titiwangsa	P012 Jerai	G						C	P135 Alor Gajah (Minister)	P159 Pasir Gudang (Minister)	P204 Betong (Deputy Minister)	P105 Petaling Jaya Selatan (Deputy Minister)	P211 Sibu (Deputy Minister)
	P181 Tenom	P146 Muar	P164 Pontian	P191 Kalabakan	P003 Arau	G						C	P143 Pagoh (Minister)	P108 Shah Alam (Minister)	P060 Taiping (Deputy Minister)	P128 Seremban (Deputy Minister)	P075 Bagan Datok (Deputy Minister)
	P054 Gerik	P138 Kota Melaka	P098 Gombak	P141 Sekijang	P005 Jerlun	H			the Mace			B	P156 Kota Tinggi (Minister)	P189 Semporna (Minister)	Senator (Minister)	P154 Mersing (Deputy Minister)	P063 Tambun (Deputy Minister)
	P144 Ledang	P150 Batu Pahat	P069 Parit	P101 Hulu Langat	P021 Kota Bharu	H			the Mace			B	P067 Kuala Kangsar (Minister)	P217 Miri (Minister)	P125 Putrajaya (Minister)	P080 Raub (Deputy Minister)	P052 Bayan Baru (Deputy Minister)
	P185 Batu Sapi	P136 Tangga Batu	P007 Padang Terap	P103 Puchong	P059 Bukit Gantang	H			the Mace			B	P179 Ranau (Minister)	Senator (Minister)	P118 Setiawangsa (Minister)	P192 Mas Gading (Deputy Minister)	P072 Tapah (Deputy Minister)
	P028 Pasir Puteh	P131 Rembau	P026 Ketereh	P174 Penampang	P046 Batu Kawan	H			the Mace			B	P068 Beruas (Minister)	P097 Selayang (Minister)	P014 Merbok (Minister)	P176 Kimanis (Deputy Minister)	P132 Telok Kemang (Deputy Minister)
	P186 Sandakan	P011 Pendang	P024 Kubang Kerian	P044 Permatang Pauh	P019 Tumpat	I						A	P062 Sungai Siput (Minister)	P091 Rompin (Minister)	P033 Besut (Minister)	P081 Jerantut (Deputy Minister)	P048 Bukit Bendera (Deputy Minister)
	P195 Bandar Kuching	P022 Pasir Mas	P023 Rantau Panjang	P020 Pengkalan Chepa	P114 Kepong	I						A	P165 Tanjong Piai (Minister)	P121 Lembah Pantai (Minister)	P157 Pengerang (Minister)	P058 Bagan Serai (Deputy Minister)	P055 Lenggong (Deputy Minister)
	P043 Bagan	P049 Tanjong	P120 Bukit Bintang	P065 Ipoh Barat	P051 Bukit Gelugor	I						A	P085 Pekan (Deputy Prime Minister)	P126 Jelebu (Minister)	P142 Labis (Minister)	P042 Tasek Gelugor (Deputy Minister)	P178 Sipitang (Deputy Speaker)
	P066 Batu Gajah	P122 Seputeh	P123 Cheras	P045 Bukit Mertajam	P064 Ipoh Timor (Opposition Leader)	I			Secretary			A	P041 Kepala Batas (Prime Minister)	P153 Sembrong (Minister)	P168 Kota Marudu (Minister)	P100 Pandan (Deputy Minister)	P163 Kulai (Deputy Speaker)
									P073 Pasir Salak (Speaker)
									Yang Di-Pertuan Agong

== Elected members by state ==
Shortcut:

Perlis | Kedah | Kelantan | Terengganu | Pulau Pinang | Perak | Pahang | Selangor | Kuala Lumpur | Putrajaya | Negeri Sembilan | Melaka | Johor | Labuan | Sabah | Sarawak

Unless noted otherwise, the MPs served the entire term of the parliament (from 17 May 2004 until 13 February 2008).

=== Perlis ===
No.	Federal Constituency	Member	Party
BN 3
P001	Padang Besar	Azmi Khalid	BN (UMNO)
P002	Kangar	Mohd Radzi Sheikh Ahmad	BN (UMNO)
P003	Arau	Syed Razlan Syed Putra Jamallullail	BN (UMNO)

=== Kedah ===
No.	Federal Constituency	Member	Party
BN 14 | PAS 1
P004	Langkawi	Abu Bakar Taib	BN (UMNO)
P005	Jerlun	Abdul Rahman Ariffin	BN (UMNO)
P006	Kubang Pasu	Mohd Johari Baharum	BN (UMNO)
P007	Padang Terap	Ghazali Ibrahim	BN (UMNO)
P008	Pokok Sena	Abdul Rahman Ibrahim	BN (UMNO)
P009	Alor Star	Chor Chee Heung	BN (MCA)
P010	Kuala Kedah	Hashim Jahaya	BN (UMNO)
P011	Pendang	Mohd Hayati Othman	BA (PAS)
P012	Jerai	Badruddin Amiruldin	BN (UMNO)
P013	Sik	Wan Azmi Wan Ariffin	BN (UMNO)
P014	Merbok	Zainuddin Maidin	BN (UMNO)
P015	Sungai Petani	Mahadzir Mohd Khir	BN (UMNO)
P016	Baling	Mashitah Ibrahim	BN (UMNO)
P017	Padang Serai	Lim Bee Kau	BN (MCA)
P018	Kulim-Bandar Baharu	Abdul Kadir Sheikh Fadzir	BN (UMNO)

=== Kelantan ===
No.	Federal Constituency	Member	Party
BN 9 | PAS 5
P019	Tumpat	Kamarudin Jaffar	BA (PAS)
P020	Pengkalan Chepa	Abdul Halim Abdul Rahman	BA (PAS)
P021	Kota Bharu	Mohd Zaid Ibrahim	BN (UMNO)
P022	Pasir Mas	Ismail Noh	BA (PAS)
P023	Rantau Panjang	Abdul Fatah Harun	BA (PAS)
P024	Kubang Kerian	Salahuddin Ayub	BA (PAS)
P025	Bachok	Awang Adek Hussin	BN (UMNO)
P026	Ketereh	Md Alwi Che Ahmad	BN (UMNO)
P027	Tanah Merah	Shaari Hassan	BN (UMNO)
P028	Pasir Puteh	Che Min Che Ahmad from 12 July 2004 (Note: Initially, the Returning Officer had declared Kalthom Othman as the elected MP for Pasir Puteh at the night of 21 March 2004. However, BN candidate Che Min Che Ahmad filed his petition to nullify the election due to inconsistent figure in the vote counting documents. The Election Court had made such a shocked decision to declare him as the rightful winner in June 2004, 3 months after the 11th General Election. No by-election was held by the Election Commission of Malaysia.)	BN (UMNO)
P028	Pasir Puteh	Kalthom Othman until 24 June 2004	BA (PAS)
P029	Machang	Sazmi Miah	BN (UMNO)
P030	Jeli	Mustapa Mohamed	BN (UMNO)
P031	Kuala Krai	Mohamed Razali Che Mamat	BN (UMNO)
P032	Gua Musang	Tengku Razaleigh Hamzah	BN (UMNO)

=== Terengganu ===
No.	Federal Constituency	Member	Party
BN 8
P033	Besut	Abdullah Md Zin	BN (UMNO)
P034	Setiu	Mohd Yusop Majid	BN (UMNO)
P035	Kuala Nerus	Che Azmi Abd Rahman	BN (UMNO)
P036	Kuala Terengganu	Razali Ismail	BN (UMNO)
P037	Marang	Abdul Rahman Bakar	BN (UMNO)
P038	Hulu Terengganu	Tengku Putera Tengku Awang	BN (UMNO)
P039	Dungun	Rosli Mat Hassan	BN (UMNO)
P040	Kemaman	Ahmad Shabery Cheek	BN (UMNO)

=== Penang ===
No.	Federal Constituency	Member	Party
BN 8 | DAP 4 | PKR 1
P041	Kepala Batas	Abdullah Ahmad Badawi	BN (UMNO)
P042	Tasek Gelugor	Mohd Shariff Omar	BN (UMNO)
P043	Bagan	Lim Hock Seng	DAP
P044	Permatang Pauh	Wan Azizah Wan Ismail	BA (PKR)
P045	Bukit Mertajam	Chong Eng	DAP
P046	Batu Kawan	Huan Cheng Guan	BN (Gerakan)
P047	Nibong Tebal	Zainal Abidin Osman	BN (UMNO)
P048	Bukit Bendera	Chia Kwang Chye	BN (Gerakan)
P049	Tanjong	Chow Kon Yeow	DAP
P050	Jelutong	Lee Kah Choon	BN (Gerakan)
P051	Bukit Gelugor	Karpal Singh	DAP
P052	Bayan Baru	Wong Kam Hoong	BN (MCA)
P053	Balik Pulau	Hilmi Yahaya	BN (UMNO)

=== Perak ===
No.	Federal Constituency	Member	Party
BN 21 | DAP 3
P054	Gerik	Wan Hashim Wan Teh	BN (UMNO)
P055	Lenggong	Khamsiyah Yeop	BN (UMNO)
P056	Larut	Raja Ahmad Zainuddin Raja Omar	BN (UMNO)
P057	Parit Buntar	Abdul Hamid Zainal Abidin	BN (UMNO)
P058	Bagan Serai	Zainal Abidin Zin	BN (UMNO)
P059	Bukit Gantang	Tan Lian Hoe	BN (Gerakan)
P060	Taiping	M. Kayveas	BN (PPP)
P061	Padang Rengas	Mohamed Nazri Abdul Aziz	BN (UMNO)
P062	Sungai Siput	Samy Vellu	BN (MIC)
P063	Tambun	Ahmad Husni Hanadzlah	BN (UMNO)
P064	Ipoh Timor	Lim Kit Siang	DAP
P065	Ipoh Barat	M. Kulasegaran	DAP
P066	Batu Gajah	Fong Po Kuan	DAP
P067	Kuala Kangsar	Rafidah Aziz	BN (UMNO)
P068	Beruas	Lim Keng Yaik	BN (Gerakan)
P069	Parit	Nasarudin Hashim	BN (UMNO)
P070	Kampar	Hew See Tong	BN (MCA)
P071	Gopeng	Ting Chew Peh	BN (MCA)
P072	Tapah	S. Veerasingam	BN (MIC)
P073	Pasir Salak	Ramli Ngah Talib (Note: Ramli was elected as the Speaker on 22 November 2004 following the death of Mohamed Zahir Ismail.) (Speaker)	BN (UMNO)
P074	Lumut	Kong Cho Ha	BN (MCA)
P075	Bagan Datok	Ahmad Zahid Hamidi	BN (UMNO)
P076	Telok Intan	Mah Siew Keong	BN (Gerakan)
P077	Tanjong Malim	Loke Yuen Yow	BN (MCA)

=== Pahang ===
No.	Federal Constituency	Member	Party
BN 14
P078	Cameron Highlands	Devamany Krishnasamy	BN (MIC)
P079	Lipis	Mohamad Shahrum Osman	BN (UMNO)
P080	Raub	Ng Yen Yen	BN (MCA)
P081	Jerantut	Tengku Azlan Sultan Abu Bakar	BN (UMNO)
P082	Indera Mahkota	Wan Adnan Wan Mamat	BN (UMNO)
P083	Kuantan	Fu Ah Kiow	BN (MCA)
P084	Paya Besar	Siti Zaharah Sulaiman	BN (UMNO)
P085	Pekan	Najib Razak	BN (UMNO)
P086	Maran	Ismail Muttalib	BN (UMNO)
P087	Kuala Krau	Ismail Mohamed Said	BN (UMNO)
P088	Temerloh	Mohd Sarit Yusoh	BN (UMNO)
P089	Bentong	Liow Tiong Lai	BN (MCA)
P090	Bera	Ismail Sabri Yaakob	BN (UMNO)
P091	Rompin	Jamaluddin Jarjis	BN (UMNO)

=== Selangor ===
No.	Federal Constituency	Member	Party
BN 22
P092	Sabak Bernam	Mat Yasir Ikhsan	BN (UMNO)
P093	Sungai Besar	Noriah Kasnon	BN (UMNO)
P094	Hulu Selangor	Palanivel Govindasamy	BN (MIC)
P095	Tanjong Karang	Noh Omar	BN (UMNO)
P096	Kuala Selangor	Mohd Daud Tarihep	BN (UMNO)
P097	Selayang	Chan Kong Choy	BN (MCA)
P098	Gombak	Rahman Ismail	BN (UMNO)
P099	Ampang	Rozaidah Talib	BN (UMNO)
P100	Pandan	Ong Tee Keat	BN (MCA)
P101	Hulu Langat	Markiman Kobiran	BN (UMNO)
P102	Serdang	Yap Pian Hon	BN (MCA)
P103	Puchong	Lau Yeng Peng	BN (Gerakan)
P104	Kelana Jaya	Loh Seng Kok	BN (MCA)
P105	Petaling Jaya Selatan	Donald Lim Siang Chai	BN (MCA)
P106	Petaling Jaya Utara	Chew Mei Fun	BN (MCA)
P107	Subang	Karnail Singh Nijhar	BN (MIC)
P108	Shah Alam	Ab Aziz Shamsuddin	BN (UMNO)
P109	Kapar	P. Komala Devi M. Perumal	BN (MIC)
P110	Klang	Tan Yee Kew	BN (MCA)
P111	Kota Raja	S. Vigneswaran M. Sanasee	BN (MIC)
P112	Kuala Langat	Shafie Mohd Salleh	BN (UMNO)
P113	Sepang	Mohd Zin Mohamed	BN (UMNO)

=== Federal Territory of Kuala Lumpur ===
No.	Federal Constituency	Member	Party
BN 7 | DAP 4
P114	Kepong	Tan Seng Giaw	DAP
P115	Batu	Ng Lip Yong	BN (Gerakan)
P116	Wangsa Maju	Yew Teong Look	BN (MCA)
P117	Segambut	Tan Kee Kwong	BN (Gerakan)
P118	Setiawangsa	Zulhasnan Rafique	BN (UMNO)
P119	Titiwangsa	Astaman Abdul Aziz	BN (UMNO)
P120	Bukit Bintang	Fong Kui Lun	DAP
P121	Lembah Pantai	Shahrizat Abdul Jalil	BN (UMNO)
P122	Seputeh	Teresa Kok Suh Sim	DAP
P123	Cheras	Tan Kok Wai	DAP
P124	Bandar Tun Razak	Tan Chai Ho	BN (MCA)

=== Federal Territory of Putrajaya ===
No.	Federal Constituency	Member	Party
BN 1
P125	Putrajaya	Tengku Adnan Tengku Mansor	BN (UMNO)

=== Negeri Sembilan ===
No.	Federal Constituency	Member	Party
BN 8
P126	Jelebu	Rais Yatim	BN (UMNO)
P127	Jempol	Mohd Isa Abdul Samad	BN (UMNO)
P128	Seremban	Hon Choon Kim	BN (MCA)
P129	Kuala Pilah	Hassan Malek	BN (UMNO)
P130	Rasah	Goh Siow Huat	BN (MCA)
P131	Rembau	Firdaus Harun	BN (UMNO)
P132	Telok Kemang	Sothinathan Sinna Goundar	BN (MIC)
P133	Tampin	Shaziman Abu Mansor	BN (UMNO)

=== Malacca ===
No.	Federal Constituency	Member	Party
BN 6
P134	Masjid Tanah	Abu Seman Yusop	BN (UMNO)
P135	Alor Gajah	Fong Chan Onn	BN (MCA)
P136	Tangga Batu	Idris Haron	BN (UMNO)
P137	Bukit Katil	Mohd Ruddin Ab Ghani	BN (UMNO)
P138	Kota Melaka	Wong Nai Chee	BN (MCA)
P139	Jasin	Mohammad Said Yusof	BN (UMNO)

=== Johor ===
No.	Federal Constituency	Member	Party
BN 25 | VAC 1
P140	Segamat	Subramaniam Sathasivam	BN (MIC)
P141	Sekijang	Baharum Mohamed	BN (UMNO)
P142	Labis	Vacant since 2 January 2008 (Note: Resigned over sex scandal)	VAC
P142	Labis	Chua Soi Lek	BN (MCA)
P143	Pagoh	Muhyiddin Yassin	BN (UMNO)
P144	Ledang	Hamim Samuri	BN (UMNO)
P145	Bakri	Chua Jui Meng	BN (MCA)
P146	Muar	Razali Ibrahim	BN (UMNO)
P147	Parit Sulong	Syed Hood Syed Edros	BN (UMNO)
P148	Ayer Hitam	Wee Ka Siong	BN (MCA)
P149	Sri Gading	Mohamad Aziz	BN (UMNO)
P150	Batu Pahat	Junaidy Abd Wahab	BN (UMNO)
P151	Simpang Renggam	Kerk Choo Ting	BN (Gerakan)
P152	Kluang	Hoo Seong Chang	BN (MCA)
P153	Sembrong	Hishammuddin Hussein	BN (UMNO)
P154	Mersing	Abdul Latiff Ahmad	BN (UMNO)
P155	Tenggara	Adham Baba	BN (UMNO)
P156	Kota Tinggi	Syed Hamid Albar	BN (UMNO)
P157	Pengerang	Azalina Othman Said	BN (UMNO)
P158	Tebrau	Teng Boon Soon	BN (MCA)
P159	Pasir Gudang	Mohamed Khaled Nordin	BN (UMNO)
P160	Johor Bahru	Shahrir Abdul Samad	BN (UMNO)
P161	Pulai	Nur Jazlan Mohamed	BN (UMNO)
P162	Gelang Patah	Tan Ah Eng	BN (MCA)
P163	Kulai	Lim Si Cheng (Deputy Speaker)	BN (MCA)
P164	Pontian	Hasni Mohammad	BN (UMNO)
P165	Tanjong Piai	Ong Ka Ting	BN (MCA)

=== Federal Territory of Labuan ===
No.	Federal Constituency	Member	Party
BN 1
P166	Labuan	Suhaili Abdul Rahman	BN (UMNO)

=== Sabah ===
No.	Federal Constituency	Member	Party
BN 24 | IND 1
P167	Kudat	Abdul Rahim Bakri	BN (UMNO)
P168	Kota Marudu	Maximus Johnity Ongkili	BN (PBS)
P169	Kota Belud	Salleh Said Keruak	BN (UMNO)
P170	Tuaran	Wilfred Madius Tangau	BN (UPKO)
P171	Sepanggar	Eric Majimbun	BN (SAPP)
P172	Kota Kinabalu	Yee Moh Chai	BN (PBS)
P173	Putatan	Marcus Mojigoh	BN (UPKO)
P174	Penampang	Donald Peter Mojuntin	BN (UPKO)
P175	Papar	Rosnah Abdul Rashid Shirlin	BN (UMNO)
P176	Kimanis	Anifah Aman	BN (UMNO)
P177	Beaufort	Azizah Mohd Dun	BN (UMNO)
P178	Sipitang	Yusof Yacob (Deputy Speaker)	BN (UMNO)
P179	Ranau	Bernard Giluk Dompok	BN (UPKO)
P180	Keningau	Joseph Pairin Kitingan	BN (PBS)
P181	Tenom	Raime Unggi	BN (UMNO)
P182	Pensiangan	Bernard S. Maraat	BN (PBRS)
P183	Beluran	Ronald Kiandee	BN (UMNO)
P184	Libaran	Juslie Ajirol	BN (UMNO)
P185	Batu Sapi	Edmund Chong Ket Wah	BN (PBS)
P186	Sandakan	Chong Hon Min	IND
P187	Kinabatangan	Bung Moktar Radin	BN (UMNO)
P188	Silam	Samsu Baharun Abd Rahman	BN (UMNO)
P189	Semporna	Shafie Apdal	BN (UMNO)
P190	Tawau	Shim Paw Fatt	BN (SAPP)
P191	Kalabakan	Abdul Ghapur Salleh	BN (UMNO)

=== Sarawak ===
No.	Federal Constituency	Member	Party
BN 27 | DAP 1
P192	Mas Gading	Tiki Lafe	BN (SPDP)
P193	Santubong	Wan Junaidi Tuanku Jaafar	BN (PBB)
P194	Petra Jaya	Fadillah Yusof	BN (PBB)
P195	Bandar Kuching	Chong Chieng Jen	DAP
P196	Stampin	Yong Khoon Seng	BN (SUPP)
P197	Kota Samarahan	Abdul Taib Mahmud	BN (PBB)
P198	Mambong	James Dawos Mamit	BN (PBB)
P199	Serian	Richard Riot Jaem	BN (SUPP)
P200	Batang Sadong	Adenan Satem	BN (PBB)
P201	Batang Lupar	Rohani Abdul Karim	BN (PBB)
P202	Sri Aman	Jimmy Donald Lim	BN (PRS)
P203	Lubok Antu	Jawah Gerang	BN (PRS)
P204	Betong	Douglas Uggah Embas	BN (PBB)
P205	Saratok	Jelaing Mersat	BN (SPDP)
P206	Kuala Rajang	Wahab Dollah	BN (PBB)
P207	Sarikei	Law Hieng Ding	BN (SUPP)
P208	Julau	Joseph Salang Gandum	BN (PRS)
P209	Kanowit	Aaron Ago Dagang	BN (PRS)
P210	Lanang	Tiong Thai King	BN (SUPP)
P211	Sibu	Robert Lau Hoi Chew	BN (SUPP)
P212	Mukah	Leo Michael Toyad	BN (PBB)
P213	Selangau	Joseph Entulu Belaun	BN (PRS)
P214	Kapit	Alexander Nanta Linggi	BN (PBB)
P215	Hulu Rajang	Billy Abit Joo	BN (PRS)
P216	Bintulu	Tiong King Sing	BN (SPDP)
P217	Miri	Peter Chin Fah Kui	BN (SUPP)
P218	Baram	Jacob Dungau Sagan	BN (SPDP)
P219	Bukit Mas	Henry Sum Agong	BN (PBB)
