= Kohilan Pillay Appu =

Malaysian politician and lawyer

Yang Berbahagia Datuk Kohilan Pillay Appu PMW AMS

Council Member of the Malaysian Senators Council
- Incumbent
- Assumed office 2023

Vice President of the Malaysian Indian Congress
- In office 2019–2024 Serving with Murugiah Thopasamy (2018–2024); Asojan Muniyandy (2018–2024); Vell Paari Samy Vellu (2019–2024); Mohan Thangarasu (2015–2024)
- President: Vigneswaran Sanasee

Deputy Minister of Foreign Affairs II
- In office 10 April 2009 – 15 May 2013 Serving with Lee Chee Leong (2009–2010) & Richard Riot Jaem (2010–2013) (Deputy Minister of Foreign Affairs I)
- Prime Minister: Najib Razak
- Minister: Anifah Aman
- Succeeded by: Hamzah Zainudin (Deputy Minister of Foreign Affairs)
- Constituency: Senator

Deputy Minister of Plantation Industries and Commodities
- In office 19 March 2008 – 9 April 2009
- Prime Minister: Abdullah Ahmad Badawi
- Minister: Peter Chin Fah Kui
- Preceded by: Anifah Aman
- Succeeded by: Hamzah Zainudin
- Constituency: Senator

Senator

Appointed by Yang di-Pertuan Agong
- In office 14 February 2011 – 13 February 2014
- In office 12 February 2008 – 11 February 2011

Personal details
- Born: 24 July 1967 (age 58) Selangor, Federation of Malaya
- Party: Parti Gerakan Rakyat Malaysia (Gerakan) (1992–2018); Malaysian Indian Congress (MIC) (2019–present)
- Other political affiliations: Barisan Nasional (BN) (1992–2018; 2019–present)
- Occupation: Politician
- Profession: Teacher

Kohilan Pillay a/l Appu (born 1967) is a Malaysian politician and teacher who served as Deputy Minister of Foreign Affairs II in the Barisan Nasional (BN) administration under Prime Minister Najib Razak and former Minister Anifah Aman from April 2009 to May 2013, Deputy Minister of Plantation Industries and Commodities under Prime Minister Abdullah Ahmad Badawi and former Minister Peter Chin Fah Kui from March 2008 to April 2009 and Senator from February 2008 to February 2014. He is a member of Malaysian Indian Congress (MIC), a component party of Barisan Nasional (BN) and was a member of Parti Gerakan Rakyat Malaysia (Gerakan).

== Political career ==
He has been very active in politics for 16 years, since he graduated from higher education. He began his political career by becoming an ordinary member of the Gerakan and then held the position of Branch Secretary. In 1995, his application to open his own branch was approved by the Party Central Committee. He became the Chairman of the Batu Caves Branch and in 1998, he contested and succeeded as the Chairman of the Gombak Division. Under his leadership, the Gombak Gerakan Party grew rapidly and was very active at all levels. Seeing his activism and leadership by the Gerakan Party Central, he was appointed as a Council Member of the Selayang Municipal Council in 1999.

Kohilan appointed as Senator in February 2008 and served until February 2014. In the Abdullah Third cabinet, he was appointed as Deputy Minister of Plantation Industries and Commodities. In the Najib First cabinet, he was transferred as Deputy Minister of Foreign Affairs II.

Kohilan join MIC in 2019, he state that Gerakan has lost its vision and mission.

== Election results ==
Parliament of Malaysia
Year	Constituency	Candidate	Votes	Pct	Opponent(s)	Votes	Pct	Ballots cast	Majority	Turnout
2013	P103 Puchong	Kohilan Pillay Appu (Gerakan)	30,136	31.93%	Gobind Singh Deo (DAP)	62,938	66.69%	94,367	32,802	88.19%
2022	P115 Batu	Kohilan Pillay Appu (MIC)	10,398	11.93%	Prabakaran Parameswaran (PKR)	45,716	52.46%	87,841	22,241	76.54%
2022	P115 Batu	Kohilan Pillay Appu (MIC)	10,398	11.93%	Azhar Yahya (PAS)	23,475	26.94%	87,841	22,241	76.54%
2022	P115 Batu	Kohilan Pillay Appu (MIC)	10,398	11.93%	Chua Tian Chang (IND)	4,603	5.28%	87,841	22,241	76.54%
2022	P115 Batu	Kohilan Pillay Appu (MIC)	10,398	11.93%	Wan Azliana Wan Adnan (PEJUANG)	849	0.97%	87,841	22,241	76.54%
2022	P115 Batu	Kohilan Pillay Appu (MIC)	10,398	11.93%	Siti Kasim (IND)	653	0.75%	87,841	22,241	76.54%
2022	P115 Batu	Kohilan Pillay Appu (MIC)	10,398	11.93%	Nur Fathiah Syazwana Shaharuddin (IND)	628	0.72%	87,841	22,241	76.54%
2022	P115 Batu	Kohilan Pillay Appu (MIC)	10,398	11.93%	Naganathan Pillai (WARISAN)	525	0.66%	87,841	22,241	76.54%
2022	P115 Batu	Kohilan Pillay Appu (MIC)	10,398	11.93%	Zulkifli Abdul Fadlan (PRM)	137	0.16%	87,841	22,241	76.54%
2022	P115 Batu	Kohilan Pillay Appu (MIC)	10,398	11.93%	Too Gao Lan (IND)	112	0.13%	87,841	22,241	76.54%

== Honours ==
- Federal Territory (Malaysia)
  - Commander of the Order of the Territorial Crown (PMW) – Datuk (2014)
- Selangor
  - Member of the Order of the Crown of Selangor (AMS) (2006)
