= Deputy Minister of Foreign Affairs (Malaysia) =

Malaysia government deputy minister

- Timbalan Menteri Luar Negeri
- Coat of Arms of Government of Malaysia
- Incumbent; Lukanisman Awang Sauni since 17 December 2025
- Ministry of Foreign Affairs
- Style: Foreign Affairs Deputy Minister (informal); Yang Berhormat; The Honourable (within Malaysia)
- Reports to: Prime Minister of Malaysia; Minister of Foreign Affairs of Malaysia
- Seat: Putrajaya, Malaysia
- Nominator: Prime Minister of Malaysia
- Appointer: The Yang di-Pertuan Agong; on advice of the Prime Minister
- Term length: No fixed term
- Formation: 9 July 1979
- First holder: Mokhtar Hashim
- Salary: RM9,763.20 per month
- Website: www.kln.gov.my

The Deputy Minister of Foreign Affairs (Malay: Timbalan Menteri Luar Negeri; Chinese: 外交部副部长; Tamil: வெளியுறவுத்துறை துணை அமைச்சர்) is a non-Malaysian cabinet position serving as deputy head of the Ministry of Foreign Affairs.

The Ministry of External Affairs was created in 1956 with the Independence of Malaya looming. It was not until 1965 when the ministry was renamed the Ministry of Foreign Affairs and relocated from the Sultan Abdul Samad Building in Kuala Lumpur to Wisma Putra in Putrajaya. Nevertheless, the position of deputy minister was only created in 1979 with only a full minister at the helm of the ministry previously.

== List of deputy ministers ==
The following individuals have been appointed as Deputy Minister of Foreign Affairs, or any of its precedent titles:

Colour key (for political coalition/parties):

Coalition	Component party	Timeline
Barisan Nasional (BN)	Malaysian Chinese Association (MCA)	1973–present
Barisan Nasional (BN)	Malaysian People's Movement Party (Gerakan)	1973–2018
Barisan Nasional (BN)	Sarawak Native People's Party (PBDS)	1983–2004
Barisan Nasional (BN)	Sarawak United Peoples' Party (SUPP)	2002–2018
Barisan Nasional (BN)	Parti Pesaka Bumiputera Bersatu (PBB)	1973–2018
Barisan Nasional (BN)	United Malays National Organisation (UMNO)	1973–present
Pakatan Harapan (PH)	Malaysian United Indigenous Party (BERSATU)	2017–2020
Perikatan Nasional (PN)	Malaysian United Indigenous Party (BERSATU)	2020–present
Gabungan Parti Sarawak (GPS)	Parti Pesaka Bumiputera Bersatu (PBB)	2018–present

=== Deputy Minister of Foreign Affairs (1979–present) ===
Portrait	Name (Birth–Death) Constituency	Political coalition	Political party	Took office	Left office	Prime Minister (Cabinet)
	Mokhtar Hashim (1942–2020); MP for Tampin	BN	UMNO	9 July 1979	1 June 1983	Hussein Onn (II); Mahathir Mohamad (I)
	Abdul Kadir Sheikh Fadzir (b.1939); MP for Kulim-Bandar Baharu	BN	UMNO	2 June 1983	20 May 1987	Mahathir Mohamad (II · III)
	Abdullah Fadzil Che Wan (b.1945); MP for Bukit Gantang	BN	UMNO	20 May 1987	8 May 1995	Mahathir Mohamad (III · IV · V)
	Leo Michael Toyad (b.1950); MP for Mukah	BN	PBB	8 May 1995	30 March 2004	Mahathir Mohamad (V · VI); Abdullah Ahmad Badawi (I)
	Joseph Salang Gandum (b.1951); MP for Julau	BN	PBDS	23 March 2004	19 March 2008	Abdullah Ahmad Badawi (II)
	Abdul Rahim Bakri (b.1961); MP for Kudat	BN	UMNO	19 April 2008	10 April 2009	Abdullah Ahmad Badawi (III)
	Lee Chee Leong (b.1957); MP for Kampar	BN	MCA	10 April 2009	4 June 2010	Najib Razak (I)
	Kohilan Pillay Appu (b. 1967); Senator	BN	Gerakan	10 April 2009	6 May 2013	Najib Razak (I)
	Richard Riot Jaem (b.1951); MP for Serian	BN	SUPP	4 June 2010	6 May 2013	Najib Razak (I)
	Hamzah Zainudin (b. 1957); MP for Larut	BN	UMNO	6 May 2013	28 July 2015	Najib Razak (II)
	Reezal Merican Naina Merican (b.1972); MP for Kepala Batas	BN	UMNO	29 July 2015	9 May 2018	Najib Razak (II)
	Marzuki Yahya (b.1970); Senator	PH	BERSATU	17 July 2018	24 February 2020	Mahathir Mohamad (VII)
	Kamarudin Jaffar (b.1951); MP for Bandar Tun Razak	PN	BERSATU	10 March 2020	24 November 2022	Muhyiddin Yassin (I); Ismail Sabri Yaakob (I)
	Mohamad Alamin (b. 1972); MP for Kimanis	BN	UMNO	10 December 2022	17 December 2025	Anwar Ibrahim (I)
	Lukanisman Awang Sauni (b.1982); MP for Sibuti	GPS	PBB	17 December 2025	Incumbent	Anwar Ibrahim (I)

== See also ==
- Minister of Foreign Affairs (Malaysia)
