= Chua Tian Chang =

Malaysian politician (born 1963)

- 蔡添强
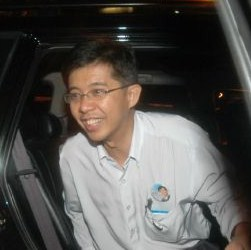

Member of the Malaysian Parliament for Batu
- In office 8 March 2008 – 9 May 2018
- Preceded by: Ng Lip Yong (BN–GERAKAN)
- Succeeded by: Prabakaran Parameswaran (Independent)
- Majority: 9,455 (2008); 13,284 (2013)

Vice President of the People's Justice Party
- In office 4 April 1999 – 17 July 2022 Serving with Nurul Izzah Anwar (2010–2018); Fuziah Salleh (2010–2014); Mansor Othman (2010–2014); Shamsul Iskandar Md Akin (2014–2018); Rafizi Ramli (2014–2022); Xavier Jayakumar (2018–2021); Zuraida Kamaruddin (2018–2020); Chang Lih Kang (2018–2022); Ali Biju (2018–2020); Michael Teo Yu Keng (2020–2022)
- President: Wan Azizah Wan Ismail (1999–2018); Anwar Ibrahim (2018–2022)

Information Chief of the People's Justice Party
- In office April 2004 – 8 March 2008
- President: Wan Azizah Wan Ismail
- Succeeded by: Muhammad Nur Manuty

Chairman of the Pertubuhan DAYA Masyarakat Malaysia

Personal details
- Born: Chua Tian Chang; 21 December 1963 (age 62) Malacca, Malaysia
- Citizenship: Malaysia
- Party: Parti Rakyat Malaysia (PRM) (until 1999); People's Justice Party (PKR) (1999–2023); Independent (since 2023)
- Other political affiliations: Barisan Alternatif (BA) (1999–2004); Pakatan Rakyat (PR) (2008–2015); Pakatan Harapan (PH) (2015–2023)
- Education: Sydney University; University of New South Wales
- Occupation: Politician
- Profession: Social activist

Chua Tian Chang, better known as Tian Chua (simplified Chinese: 蔡添强; traditional Chinese: 蔡添強; pinyin: Cài Tiānqiáng; Pe̍h-ōe-jī: Chhòa Thiam-kiông; born 21 December 1963), is a Malaysian politician who served as the Member of Parliament (MP) for Batu from March 2008 to May 2018. He was also a special advisor to the Minister of Works from March 2019 to February 2020.

A founding member of the People's Justice Party (PKR), and before that a member of the preceding National Justice Party (keADILan), Chua held the position of party vice president from April 1999 to July 2022 and Information Chief from April 2004 to March 2008. He was expelled from the party in 2022. He was also a member of Parti Rakyat Malaysia (PRM).

== Early life ==
Born in Malacca on 21 December 1963, he was the eldest of four siblings. His father, Chua Neo Lai, was of Hakka descent and worked as a rice wholesaler. His mother, Chan Yuet Chien, was a Chinese schoolteacher. Chua described both his parents, but especially his mother, as "socialist-conscious". Chua was educated in Siang Lin Primary School and Catholic High School, Melaka. He then studied Lower Six in Gajah Berang High School. In 1982, Tian went to continue his studies in Australia. He first studied Matriculation in South Sydney High School, and was later admitted into Agricultural Science in Sydney University. He said:

I wanted to be a scientist and invent things, like Thomas Edison. I got interested in the agro-sciences as I wanted to study things that could be useful.

In his third year, he switched to Philosophy at the University of New South Wales. It was also in Australia that he became involved in student activism, becoming involved in the Network of Overseas Student Collectives (NOSCA) and Left Alliance. "My father had hoped I'd study law for good future prospects. But I became exposed to peace movements, environmental issues, and human rights situations around the world". He was also recruited by the then-leader-in-exile of Timor-Leste, José Ramos Horta, to help prepare newsletters.

== Early career ==
Upon returning to Malaysia in 1990, he joined Suara Rakyat Malaysia (SUARAM) in the campaign against the Internal Security Act (ISA). He also began to get involved in the labour movement in Malaysia. In 1992, he joined Hong Kong-based Asia Monitor Resource Center (AMRC), a regional labour research NGO.

After his contract in Hong Kong ended, he went for further studies at the Institute of Social Studies (ISS) in The Hague, Netherlands. He graduated with Masters in Employment & Labour Studies. He returned to Malaysia in 1996, whereupon he became involved in the local solidarity movement against the Indonesian occupation of East Timor.

In 1998, SUARAM initiated a forum comprised NGOs and opposition parties known as Gagasan Demokrasi Rakyat Malaysia. The forum was officially launched during the saga of Anwar Ibrahim and Reformasi. Tian was the organisation's chairperson.

== Political career ==
Chua became involved in the Reformasi movement in 1998, attending protests held following Anwar Ibrahim's removal as deputy prime minister. He gained notoriety after a picture of him sitting in front of a police water cannon truck during a protest was printed in the media in 1999. The same year, he was invited by Wan Azizah Wan Ismail to join the National Justice Party (keADILan), later the People's Justice Party (PKR).

During the period spanning 1998–1999, Chua was arrested a total of five times (Note: The Human Rights Watch counts four arrests since September 1998, while Amnesty International counts five.) and alleged that he had been the victim of police beatings while in custody.

Chua was once again arrested, this time under the Internal Security Act (ISA), along with nine other activists and members of keADILan on 10 April 2001 and sent to the Kamunting Detention Centre. They became known as the Reformasi 10. While in detention, they were reportedly subjected to psychological abuse. He was released after two years, the maximum detention period, on 4 June 2003. Chua's then-girlfriend, activist Mabel Au Mei Po, was deported to Hong Kong following his arrest.

In the 2008 general election, Chua contested and won in the constituency of Batu. He successfully defended the seat in 2013.

Chua was disqualified from contesting in the 2018 general election by the Electoral Commission, which cited his RM2,000 fine in 2014 for insulting the modesty of a police officer. While the High Court ultimately declared his disqualification invalid, the decision came after the election. He instead endorsed independent candidate Prabakaran Parameswaran, who won and later joined PKR.

In 2019, Tian Chua was appointed as a special advisor to the Minister of Works during the Pakatan Harapan (PH) administration March 2019 to February 2020.

Chua was subjected to abuse and assaulted by party supporters following the Sheraton Move, where Azmin and his faction of MPs left the party, effectively leading to the collapse of the PH government. Despite making an appearance at the eponymous hotel at the time, Chua denied any involvement.

Ahead of the 2022 general election, Chua contested the position of party divisional chief for Batu but lost to Prabakaran. The relationship between the two reportedly soured shortly after the latter's election as MP. Following the party's decision to nominate Prabakaran as its candidate for the seat, Chua contested it as an independent and was expelled as a result. He was not elected.

== Legal issues ==
Following a 2007 demonstration in front of parliament where Chua was accused of biting a police officer's arm, he was sentenced to six months in jail or a RM3,000 fine in lieu. Upon appeal, the High Court reduced the fine to RM2,000 with the intention of avoiding a by-election. According to Article 48(1)(e) of the Federal Constitution,

“[A] person is disqualified from being a member of either House of Parliament if he [or she] has been convicted of an offence by a court of law in the Federation and sentenced to imprisonment for a term of not less than one year or to a fine of not less than RM2,000 and has not received a free pardon.”

However, due to differing interpretations of the article, namely whether the fine needed to be more than RM2,000 to be disqualifying, the issue was left unresolved until then-speaker of the Dewan Rakyat Pandikar Amin Mulia ruled that Chua was eligible to continue sitting as an MP in 2011.

In 2012, Chua was arrested at the Bersih 3.0 rally and accused of trespassing at the Police Training Centre (Pulapol). He was then charged, convicted and sentenced by the Sessions Court in 2014 to one-month's imprisonment and a RM1,000 fine for refusing a police order to leave the Pulapol. He served his sentence in 2017 following a failed appeals process.

Following the 2013 Lahad Datu standoff, Chua was accused of implying that the United Malays National Organisation (UMNO), which led the Malaysian government, orchestrated the event. He was sued for defamation by UMNO, an accusation he initially denied. After Chua agreed to withdraw his remarks, the suit was dropped. He was separately charged under the Sedition Act 1948, for which he was ultimately acquited.

In 2014, Chua was charged for insulting the modesty of the police officer using foul language. He was fined a sum of RM3,000, later reduced to RM2,000 by the High Court.

== Election results ==
Parliament of Malaysia
Year	Constituency	Candidate	Votes	Pct	Opponent(s)	Votes	Pct	Ballots cast	Majority	Turnout
1999	P121 Selandar	Chua Tian Chang (keADILan)	12,316	34.82%	Fong Chan Onn (MCA)	23,055	65.18%	36,525	10,739	73.70%
2004	P115 Batu	Chua Tian Chang (PKR)	17,201	37.46%	Ng Lip Yong (Gerakan)	28,718	62.54%	46,228	11,517	68.33%
2008	P115 Batu	Chua Tian Chang (PKR)	29,785	58.76%	Lim Si Pin (Gerakan)	20,330	40.11%	51,303	9,455	72.72%
2013	P115 Batu	Chua Tian Chang (PKR)	41,672	58.25%	Dominic Lau Hoe Chai (Gerakan)	28,388	39.68%	72,147	13,284	84.48%
2022	P115 Batu	Chua Tian Chang (IND)	4,603	5.28%	Prabakaran Parameswaran (PKR)	45,716	52.46%	87,146	22,241	76.54%
2022	P115 Batu	Chua Tian Chang (IND)	4,603	5.28%	Azhar Yahya (PAS)	23,475	26.94%	87,146	22,241	76.54%
2022	P115 Batu	Chua Tian Chang (IND)	4,603	5.28%	Kohilan Pillay Appu (MIC)	10,398	11.93%	87,146	22,241	76.54%
2022	P115 Batu	Chua Tian Chang (IND)	4,603	5.28%	Wan Azliana Wan Adnan (PEJUANG)	849	0.97%	87,146	22,241	76.54%
2022	P115 Batu	Chua Tian Chang (IND)	4,603	5.28%	Siti Kasim (IND)	653	0.75%	87,146	22,241	76.54%
2022	P115 Batu	Chua Tian Chang (IND)	4,603	5.28%	Nur Fathiah Syazwana Shaharuddin@ Cleo (IND)	628	0.72%	87,146	22,241	76.54%
2022	P115 Batu	Chua Tian Chang (IND)	4,603	5.28%	Naganathan Pillai (WARISAN)	575	0.66%	87,146	22,241	76.54%
2022	P115 Batu	Chua Tian Chang (IND)	4,603	5.28%	Zulkifli Abdul Fadlan (PRM)	137	0.16%	87,146	22,241	76.54%
2022	P115 Batu	Chua Tian Chang (IND)	4,603	5.28%	Too Gao Lan (IND)	112	0.13%	87,146	22,241	76.54%

Kedah State Legislative Assembly
Year	Constituency	Candidate	Votes	Pct	Opponent(s)	Votes	Pct	Ballots cast	Majority	Turnout
2004	N34 Lunas	Chua Tian Chang (PKR)	8,979	40.45%	Ganesan Subramaniam (MIC)	13,218	59.55%	22,197	4,239	80.86%

== In popular culture ==
In 2009, Tian Chua took the lead role in a science fiction short film titled One Future, which depicted Malaysia as an Orwellian dystopia. The character's fate at the hands of the authorities in the film mirrors aspects of Tian Chua's own public life.

== See also ==
- Batu (federal constituency)
