= Dominic Lau Hoe Chai =

Malaysian politician

Yang Berbahagia Datuk Dominic Lau Hoe Chai PMW
- 刘华才
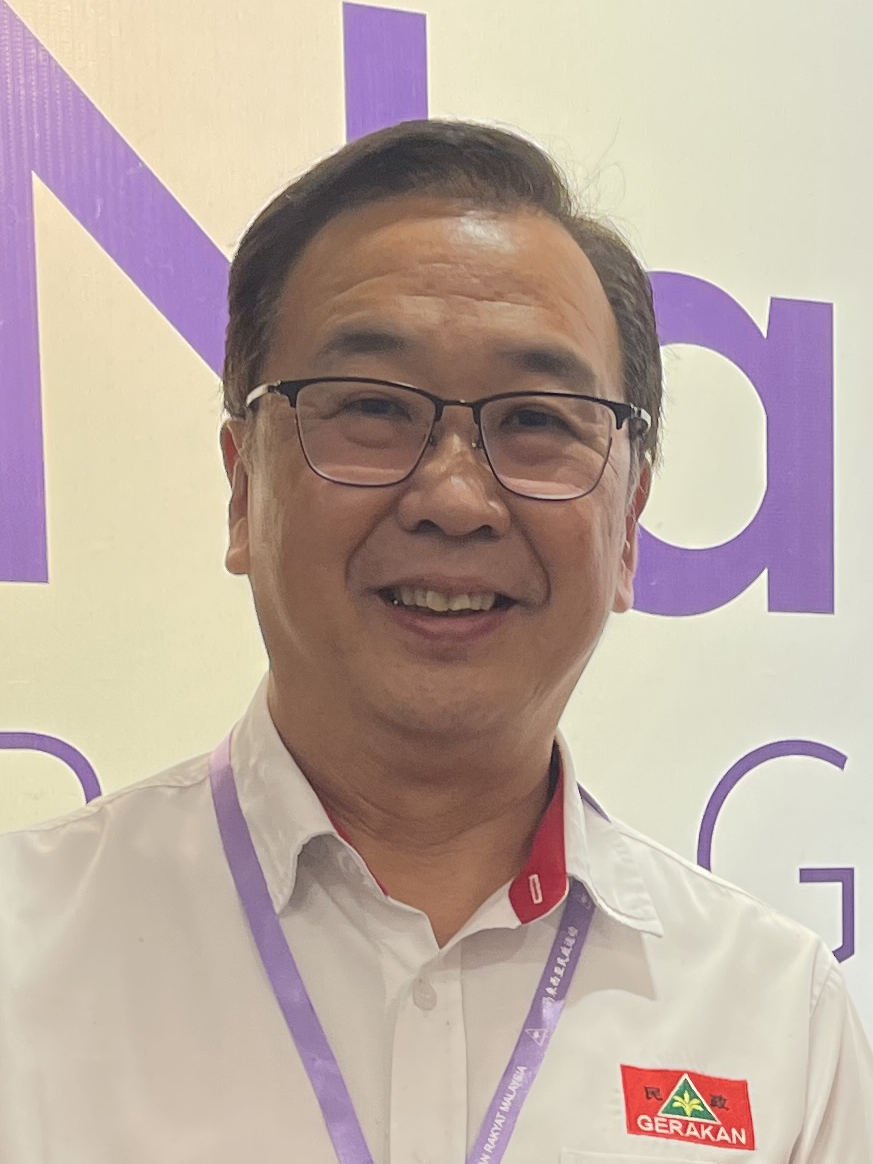
- Lau in 2024

6th President of the Parti Gerakan Rakyat Malaysia
- Incumbent
- Assumed office 17 November 2018
- Deputy: Oh Tong Keong
- Preceded by: Mah Siew Keong

Senator Appointed by the Yang di-Pertuan Agong
- In office 23 November 2021 – 22 November 2024
- Monarchs: Abdullah (2021–2024); Ibrahim (2024)
- Prime Minister: Ismail Sabri Yaakob (2021–2022); Anwar Ibrahim (2022–2024)

Faction represented in Dewan Negara
- 2021–2024: Perikatan Nasional

Personal details
- Born: Dominic Lau Hoe Chai; 18 September 1967 (age 59) Penang, Malaysia
- Party: Parti Gerakan Rakyat Malaysia (Gerakan)
- Other political affiliations: Barisan Nasional (BN) (until 2018); Perikatan Nasional (PN) (since 2021)
- Education: Campbell University; Warwick University; University of Technology Malaysia (PhD)
- Occupation: Politician

Dominic Lau Hoe Chai (Chinese: 刘华才; pinyin: Liú Huácái; Jyutping: Lau4 Waa4 Coi4; Pe̍h-ōe-jī: Lâu Hôa-châi; born 18 September 1967) is a Malaysian politician who had served as a senator from November 2021 to November 2024. He is currently the 6th President of the Parti Gerakan Rakyat Malaysia (GERAKAN), a component party of the Perikatan Nasional (PN) coalition. He succeeded Mah Siew Keong as party president in November 2018.

== Early life and education ==
Lau studied in Phor Tay Primary School, Heng Ee Secondary School and completed his Form 6 in Sek. Abdullah Munshi. Lau was a national swimmer in his youth and represented Penang from 1982 to 1987. During his stint as a swimming athlete, Lau won the championship of the Cross Channel Open Competition in 1986.

Lau graduated with a Bachelor of Science (B.Sc) in Applied Chemistry from Campbell University in 1991. He also received his MSc in Engineering Business Management from the University of Warwick in 1998, and obtained his PhD in Engineering Business Management from University of Technology Malaysia (UTM) in 2002.

== Career ==
After completing his studies in Campbell University in 1991, Lau worked as a quality assurance chemist in the acid manufacturing sector. In 1993, Lau transitioned his career to business management consulting and eventually founded his own consultancy, SQC Consulting Group in 1995. Lau remained active in the sector of business management consulting until his appointment as an associate professor in the Razak School of Engineering and Advanced Technology, Universiti Teknologi Malaysia (UTM) in 2005.

Lau is a certified Blue Ocean Strategy practitioner and was formerly the Director of Applied Research Centre of the Blue Ocean Strategy Regional Centre in UCSI University, and also the Adjunct Professor for the Centre for Postgraduate Studies & Research for Tunku Abdul Rahman University College (TARUC).

In 2013, Lau took a brief break from academia to participate in the 2013 Malaysian General Election. He returned as a Professor in Universiti Teknologi Malaysia (UTM) after the election.

== Political career ==
=== Candidate for the Batu federal seat in general elections (2013 & 2018) ===
Lau contested for the Batu federal seat in Kuala Lumpur in the 2013 and 2018 general elections representing BN and GERAKAN which he lost to Chua Tian Chang from the opposition People's Justice Party (PKR) and Pakatan Rakyat (PR) in 2013 and to independent candidate Prabakaran Parameswaran in 2018 who later joined PKR and Pakatan Harapan (PH).

=== President of Parti Gerakan Rakyat Malaysia (2018 – present) ===
==== Post-GE-14 performance ====
On 17 November 2018, Lau was elected as the 6th President of GERAKAN, succeeding Mah Siew Keong who stepped down from party presidency after the 2018 Malaysian general election. GERAKAN later left Barisan Nasional and pivoted their direction towards a political third force. Lau led the party and nominated Wendy Subramaniam as the candidate for the 2019 Tanjung Piai by-election which was held on 16 November 2019. Lau later led the party to participate in the 2021 Malacca state election and the 2022 Johor state election under the Perikatan Nasional banner. Currently, the party has no representation in the Dewan Rakyat.

==== Brief representation in Perak assembly ====
The party briefly regained representation in the Perak State Legislative Assembly by accepting Buntong assemblyman Sivasubramaniam Athinarayanan who defected from the Democratic Action Party (DAP) and Pakatan Harapan (PH) to the party on 25 June 2020. However, Sivasubramaniam soon left the party for Malaysian United Indigenous Party (BERSATU) on 4 March 2021. Lau expressed his intention to curb party hopping no matter if it is within the same coalition, and told the press that he will bring this issue forward in the Perikatan Nasional Presidential Council.

==== Joining and supporting Perikatan Nasional ====
During the 2020–2022 political crisis, Lau vocally supported the Perikatan Nasional coalition led by the 8th Prime Minister Muhyiddin Yassin before officially joining Perikatan Nasional as a component party in February 2021. Lau described the support as necessary for the sake of political stability to hasten the recovery of Malaysia from the pandemic.

In August 2021, 15 disgruntled MPs from the Barisan Nasional bench were dissatisfied with the status quo and withdrew their support from the Perikatan government led by Prime Minister Muhyiddin Yassin, toppling the Perikatan government as a result of a lack of parliamentary majority. Ismail Sabri Yaakob from Barisan Nasional was subsequently appointed as the 9th Prime Minister, effectively making Barisan Nasional the government since their electoral defeat in 2018. Although in a leading position, the Barisan Nasional government still requires the backing of Perikatan Nasional to maintain a parliamentary majority.

Perikatan Nasional continued to support the Barisan government through a confidence and supply agreement despite the loss of the prime minister position. In return, political figures from Perikatan Nasional was appointed as part of the Ismail Sabri Cabinet. Dominic Lau supported the arrangement between Perikatan Nasional and Barisan Nasional as the President of GERAKAN.

=== Senator (2021–2024) ===
The Yang di-Pertuan Agong Al-Sultan Abdullah Ri’ayatuddin Al-Mustafa Billah Shah consented to Lau's appointment as a Senator for a 3-year term from 23 November 2021 to 22 November 2024. His appointment marks the return of GERAKAN to the Parliament of Malaysia after failing to win any seats during the 2018 general election.

==== Criticisms and clarifications of appointment ====
Lau's Senatorial appointment was met with backlash due to its timing shortly after the 2021 Malacca state election. DAP was one of the vocal parties voicing out against Lau's appointment over allegations of political compensation. However, Lau dismissed the allegations and clarified the appointment had already been planned long before the election.

== Election results ==
Parliament of Malaysia
Year	Constituency	Candidate	Votes	Pct	Opponent(s)	Votes	Pct	Ballots cast	Majority	Turnout
2013	P115 Batu	Dominic Lau Hoe Chai (Gerakan)	28,388	39.77%	Chua Tian Chang (PKR)	41,672	58.58%	71,382	13,284	84.48%
2013	P115 Batu	Dominic Lau Hoe Chai (Gerakan)	28,388	39.77%	Hashim Karim (BERJASA)	949	1.33%	71,382	13,284	84.48%
2013	P115 Batu	Dominic Lau Hoe Chai (Gerakan)	28,388	39.77%	Nazariah Abbas (IND)	209	0.29%	71,382	13,284	84.48%
2013	P115 Batu	Dominic Lau Hoe Chai (Gerakan)	28,388	39.77%	Atan Jasin (IND)	164	0.23%	71,382	13,284	84.48%
2018	P115 Batu	Dominic Lau Hoe Chai (Gerakan)	13,687	21.79%	Prabakaran Parameswaran (IND)	38,125	60.70%	62,805	24,438	83.32%
2018	P115 Batu	Dominic Lau Hoe Chai (Gerakan)	13,687	21.79%	Azhar Yahya (PAS)	10,610	16.89%	62,805	24,438	83.32%
2018	P115 Batu	Dominic Lau Hoe Chai (Gerakan)	13,687	21.79%	Panjamorthy Muthusami (IND)	383	0.61%	62,805	24,438	83.32%

Penang State Legislative Assembly
Year	Constituency	Candidate	Votes	Pct	Opponent(s)	Votes	Pct	Ballots cast	Majority	Turnout
2023	N38 Bayan Lepas	Dominic Lau Hoe Chai (Gerakan)	13,573	46.75%	Azrul Mahathir Aziz (AMANAH)	15,462	53.25%	29,215	1,889	73.49%

== Honours ==
- Federal Territory (Malaysia)
  - Commander of the Order of the Territorial Crown (PMW) – Datuk (2015)

== See also ==
- Members of the Dewan Negara, 15th Malaysian Parliament
