= Prabakaran Parameswaran =

Malaysian politician and lawyer

Yang Berhormat Tuan Prabakaran Parameswaran MP
- பிரபாகரன் பரமேஸ்வரன்
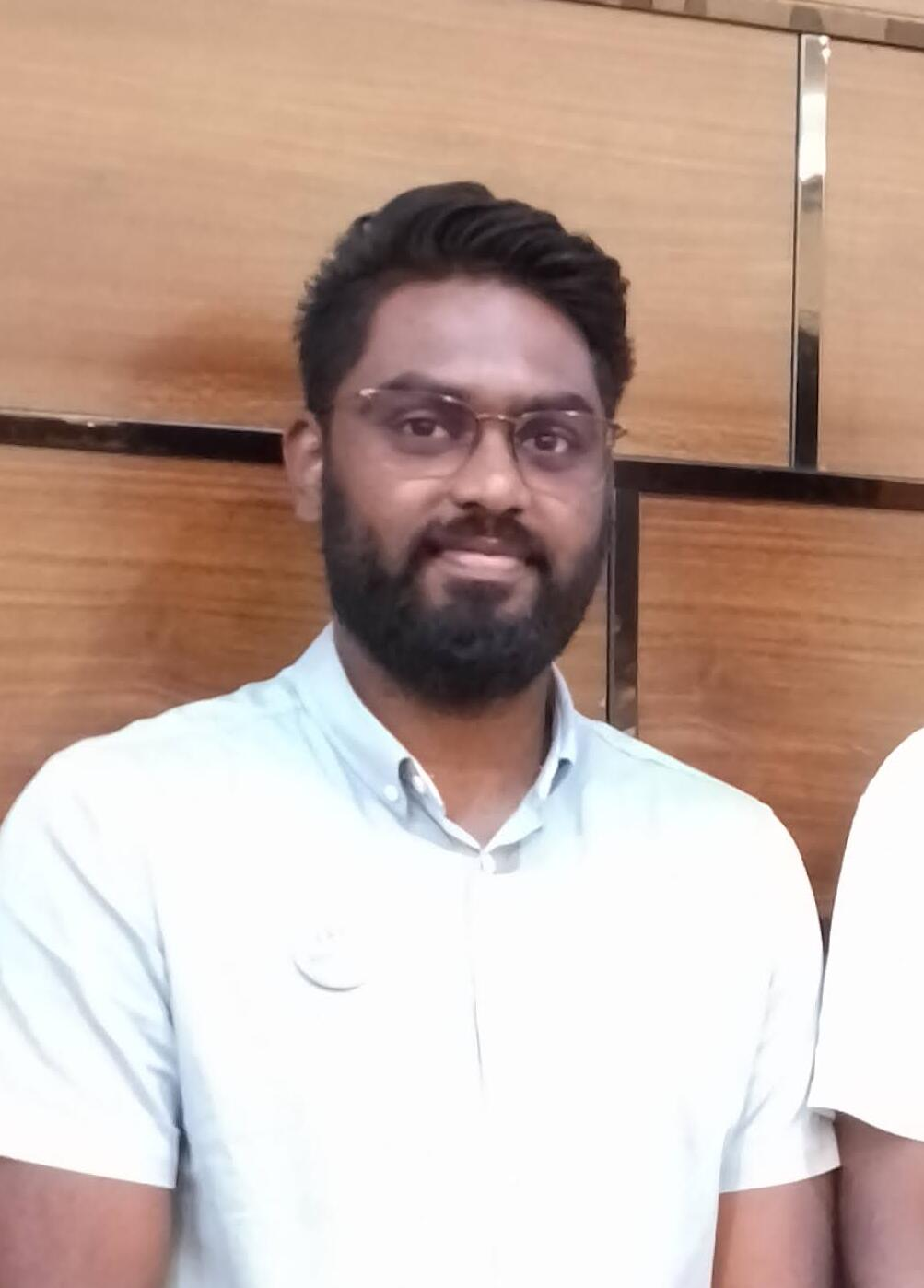
- Prabakaran in 2025

Chairman of the Special Committee of the Malaysian Indian Community Transformation Unit
- Incumbent
- Assumed office 7 February 2024
- Prime Minister: Anwar Ibrahim
- Minister: Aaron Ago Dagang (February–April 2024)
- Director-General: Raveendran Nair
- Preceded by: Ramanan Ramakrishnan

Member of the Malaysian Parliament for Batu
- Incumbent
- Assumed office 9 May 2018
- Preceded by: Chua Tian Chang (PR–PKR)
- Majority: 24,438 (2018); 22,241 (2022)

Division Chief of the People's Justice Party of Batu
- Incumbent
- Assumed office 17 July 2022
- President: Anwar Ibrahim
- Deputy: Mohd Hafiz Solkapeli
- Preceded by: Chua Tian Chang

State Youth Chief of the People's Justice Party of Federal Territories
- In office 20 February 2020 – 27 August 2022
- President: Anwar Ibrahim
- National Youth Chief: Akmal Nasrullah Mohd Nasir (2020–2022); Adam Adli (2022)
- Federal Territories Chief: Zahir Hassan (2020–2022); Rafizi Ramli (2022)
- Preceded by: Na'im Brundage
- Succeeded by: Mohammad Azfar Aza Azhar

Personal details
- Born: Prabakaran a/l Parameswaran; 8 February 1996 (age 30) Batu, Kuala Lumpur, Malaysia
- Citizenship: Malaysian
- Party: People's Justice Party (PKR) (since 2018); Independent (2018)
- Other political affiliations: Pakatan Harapan (PH) (since 2018)
- Education: Brickfields Asia College (LLB)
- Occupation: Politician
- Profession: Lawyer

Prabakaran a/l Parameswaran (born 8 February 1996) is a Malaysian politician and lawyer who has served as Chairman of the Special Committee of the Malaysian Indian Community Transformation Unit (MITRA) since February 2024 and the Member of Parliament (MP) for Batu since May 2018. He is a member of the People's Justice Party (PKR), a component party of the Pakatan Harapan (PH) coalition, and was an independent before joining PKR. He has also served as the Division Chief of PKR of Batu since July 2022. He served as the Youth Chief of PKR of Federal Territories from February 2020 to August 2022. He is also presently the second youngest MP at the age of 30 years, 238 days after Minister of Youth and Sports and Sungai Petani MP Mohammed Taufiq Johari who is a month younger than him. He was the youngest MP from 2018 to 2022 before Mohammed Taufiq took over the title after his election as an MP. However, he is the youngest to be elected at the age of 22 years, 90 days in 2018 in the history of Malaysia.

== Early life ==
Prabakaran was born in Batu, Kuala Lumpur, Malaysia and has lived there ever since his birth on 8 February 1996.

Prabakaran became interested in politics from his primary school days. His father used to force him to watch parliamentary debates and read newspapers. However, he was not keen. Only after a few years, he started to understand the changes needed in Malaysia. He later became active in debates including those with political themes in school.

== Political career ==
=== Candidate as Batu MP in 2018 general election and electoral victory ===
Prabakaran initially contested for the Batu federal seat in Kuala Lumpur on independent ticket where he should have faced opponents Chua Tian Chang from PH and PKR who was going to defend his seat, Dominic Lau Hoe Chai from Barisan Nasional (BN) and Parti Gerakan Rakyat Malaysia (GERAKAN), Azhar Yahya from the Malaysian Islamic Party (PAS) as well as another independent Panjamorthy Muthusami. However, Chua was disqualified from contesting in the election after returning officer Anwar Mohd Zain had made the decision based on a Shah Alam High Court ruling on 2 March 2018 which fined Chua RM 2,000 for insulting the modesty of a police officer that removed the eligibility of him in contesting. Chua decried the decision and accused the political opponents of BN by stating that "They are using dirty tactics to thwart the victory of PH". After that, Prabakaran offered himself to represent PH and PKR to contest on behalf as he and his family were PKR supporters. Chua then accepted the offer and turned his support for Prabakaran and helped the latter in campaigning efforts to prevent a walkover victory for BN in Batu. He reiterated his disappointment but also praising Prabakaran by adding that “I am disappointed by the decision of the court, but Prabakaran is young, energetic and idealistic, we hope to groom him to be an activist".

On 9 May 2018, Prabakaran went on to win the Batu federal seat with the help of PH and PKR by defeating all the three opponents with a total of 38,125 votes and the majority of 24,438 votes. After his victory, he quickly established his priorities as the Batu MP ranging from fighting for the rights of the youths, lowering the cost of living for young families, bringing down the voting age from 21 to 18, improving public infrastructure, making towns and cities more disabled-friendly, improving vocational and tertiary education to increasing internship opportunities for youths. He also envisioned a Malaysia where it treats all the races and religions equally and more involvements of youths in politics so as to build a more stable fundamental of leadership succession and preparing youths as leaders to take over Malaysia in future. Just four days after the election on 13 May 2018, he joined PKR and PH at an event to celebrate his victory in the election with the locals in Sentul, Kuala Lumpur.

Following his victory, he also created the history and a record as the youngest ever person elected as the MP at the age of 22 years, 90 days. Prabakaran said that he, as second-year law student, had planned to carry on his studies on a part-time basis and would discuss with his lecturer and counsellors before making a decision on his studies. He revealed that although he was happy and excited, the emotions could not be over because then he would be unable to think straight. Moreover, Prabakaran said he would have a discussion with Chua on the direction and plans he had as the new Batu MP. Chua, who was also the PKR vice-president, said he would give his support as part of his service to the people and for it to be maintained. He also wished Prabakaran the best in politics and hoped that this would encourage more youths to join politics.

=== Appointment as Federal Territory PKR Youth Chief ===
On 20 February 2020, he was appointed as Youth Chief of PKR of Federal Territory or Chief of Armada Muda Keadilan (AMK) (youth wing of PKR) of the Federal Territory by PKR National Youth Chief and MP for Johor Bahru Akmal Nasrullah Mohd Nasir replacing Na'im Brundage. The next day on 21 February 2020, he issued a statement expressing his gratitude for the appointment and adding that he was aware and agreed that this appointment was actually not something to be proud of because it carried lots of trust and hope by all senior leaders of PKR. He stated that with this, he would strive to perform all tasks including empowering young people to become leaders with high self-esteem. He would also ensure that the stage and chance given to him would be used as best as possible in driving the Reform Agenda in line with the ideological changes that the Father of "Reformasi" (reforms) and President of PKR Anwar Ibrahim wanted to implement.

=== Batu PKR division contest ===
On 29 May 2022, he was elected as the new Batu PKR Division Chief by defeating incumbent Chua who was contesting for reelection with a total of 517 votes and by a majority of 211 votes.

On 30 May 2022, he issued a statement showing gratitude to all Batu PKR division members for voting for him and seniors for guiding him through their vast experiences. He also stressed the importance for all to work together for the betterment of Batu PKR division and for PKR to cooperate tightly with other component parties in PH.

In addition, he also remarked that this was his first victory in the PKR party elections and happiness that PKR was ready to pave way for younger ones to take over the party as new leaders

2022 General elections

Shortly after this win in the party elections held in November, Prabakaran faced Tian Chua again in the general elections. In fact the Batu parliamentary seat saw a record 10 candidates including the two of them as well as candidates from PAS, MIC, PRM, Pejuang, Warisan and a number of independents.

Despite this Prabakaran scored a convincing victory getting more votes than the other nine combined, including Tian Chua who lost his deposit.

== Controversies and issues ==
=== 2019 Vehicle Egg Splattering Incident ===
On 6 November 2019, High Court judge Mariana Yahya ruled that Chua did not lose his qualification to contest as a candidate for the Batu federal seat in the 2018 Malaysian general election after she allowed the originating summons by Chua against the Election Commission (EC). She also agreed with the decision made by two separate High Courts which ruled that qualifications and rights of Chua to contest were not affected due to RM2,000 levied against him for insulting a policeman. At night on 15 November 2019, Prabakaran parked his Toyota Vellfire vehicle behind the PapaRich restaurant on Jalan Ipoh, Kuala Lumpur at about 11 pm and his vehicle was splattered with eggs, where eggshells were on the roof and front windscreen. He lodged police reports the following day. The attack came in the wake of news that a coalition of non-governmental organisations (NGOs) demanded Prabakaran to step down as Batu MP in order for Chua to contest for the Batu seat in a by-election after the ruling that Chua did not lose eligibility to contest in 2018 election was made earlier. Chua denied any involvements in the aftermath of the incident. In response, Prabakaran clarified that he was not stepping down as Batu MP and said he would like to contribute his energy and effort for the good of PKR in realising the "reformasi" (reforms) agenda and he would serve the people in a transparent and fair manner and would not drop them halfway through. In addition, he also claimed that Chua did not pressurise him and directly negotiated with him about his duties or to step down and instead gave him full support to carry on as Batu MP for a full term. He also said the people and voters of Batu wanted a spirited youth like him to solve their problems and explain the issues.

=== 2022 Rift and Exchange with Chua on Social Media ===
On 15 May 2022, a fresh rift and heated exchange formed between Prabakaran and Chua after the former posted photos of Chua at a buka puasa (fast breaking) function on social media. The bone of contention appeared to be tweet of Prabakaran on 14 May 2022 about Chua of attending what appeared to be a fast breaking event with Malaysian United Indigenous Party (BERSATU) and Parti Gerakan Rakyat Malaysia (GERAKAN) logos in the background. Both BERSATU and GERAKAN were the political rivals of PKR. Prabakaran questioned if the photo was genuine and if so, what was discussed with others at the event. However, he did not mention any names but drew a red circle around Chua in the photo. Chua responded strongly on Facebook the same day, telling Prabakaran to stop his "defamation campaign", claiming that Prabakaran was "spreading lies" about his attendance at the BERSATU event, which was "unethical and malicious". He revealed that Prabakaran had also decided to contest against him for the PKR Batu division chief position in the 2022 PKR party election but welcomed this as a manifestation of party democracy. He also warned Prabakaran not to bring the political culture of defaming others and personal attacks into PKR. Chua clarified that the event took place on 25 April 2021 and it was organised by a non-governmental organisation (NGO) with the cooperation of the Ministry of Federal Territories. He also highlighted that a team member of Prabakaran contesting against him as Batu PKR division chief namely Stephen Niles also attended the so-called 'traitors' dinner, referring to the alleged BERSATU and GERAKAN fast breaking event, as well as attaching a lengthy response from Niles about his attendance at the event last year. Prabakaran then responded on the same platform, noting that he was simply questioning the authenticity of the photo and did not intend to defame Chua as claimed. Prabakaran also regretted that Chua had "manipulated" his tweet by interpreting and saying that it was an accusation. He further clarified that he did not state that it was a BERSATU event but it was clear from the screenshot that there was a question to be answered. On a separate note, Prabakaran also stressed that he had always upheld the party constitution of PKR and rejected the political culture of defamation or colluding with traitors. However, he added that he would heed the advice of Chua and be more careful in the future.

== Election results ==
Parliament of Malaysia
Year	Constituency	Candidate	Votes	Pct	Opponent(s)	Votes	Pct	Ballots cast	Majority	Turnout
2018	P115 Batu	Prabakaran Parameswaran (IND)	38,125	60.70%	Dominic Lau Hoe Chai (Gerakan)	13,687	21.79%	62,805	24,438	83.32%
2018	P115 Batu	Prabakaran Parameswaran (IND)	38,125	60.70%	Azhar Yahya (PAS)	10,610	16.89%	62,805	24,438	83.32%
2018	P115 Batu	Prabakaran Parameswaran (IND)	38,125	60.70%	Panjamorthy Muthusami (IND)	383	0.61%	62,805	24,438	83.32%
2022	P115 Batu	Prabakaran Parameswaran (PKR)	45,716	52.46%	Azhar Yahya (PAS)	23,475	26.94%	87,841	22,241	76.54%
2022	P115 Batu	Prabakaran Parameswaran (PKR)	45,716	52.46%	Kohilan Pillay Appu (MIC)	10,398	11.93%	87,841	22,241	76.54%
2022	P115 Batu	Prabakaran Parameswaran (PKR)	45,716	52.46%	Chua Tian Chang (IND)	4,603	5.28%	87,841	22,241	76.54%
2022	P115 Batu	Prabakaran Parameswaran (PKR)	45,716	52.46%	Wan Azliana Wan Adnan (PEJUANG)	849	0.97%	87,841	22,241	76.54%
2022	P115 Batu	Prabakaran Parameswaran (PKR)	45,716	52.46%	Siti Kasim (IND)	653	0.75%	87,841	22,241	76.54%
2022	P115 Batu	Prabakaran Parameswaran (PKR)	45,716	52.46%	Nur Fathiah Syazwana Shaharuddin (IND)	628	0.72%	87,841	22,241	76.54%
2022	P115 Batu	Prabakaran Parameswaran (PKR)	45,716	52.46%	Naganathan Pillai (WARISAN)	525	0.66%	87,841	22,241	76.54%
2022	P115 Batu	Prabakaran Parameswaran (PKR)	45,716	52.46%	Zulkifli Abdul Fadlan (PRM)	137	0.16%	87,841	22,241	76.54%
2022	P115 Batu	Prabakaran Parameswaran (PKR)	45,716	52.46%	Too Cheng Huat @ Too Gao Lan (IND)	112	0.13%	87,841	22,241	76.54%

== Honours ==
=== Honours of Malaysia ===
- Malaysia
  - Recipient of the 17th Yang di-Pertuan Agong Installation Medal (2024)

== See also ==
- 2020–2021 Malaysian political crisis

Political offices
Preceded by Chua Tian Chang	Member of Parliament for Batu; 2018–present
