= Deputy Minister of Plantation and Commodities (Malaysia) =

Malaysian government deputy minister

- Timbalan Menteri Perladangan dan Komoditi
- Coat of Arms of Government of Malaysia

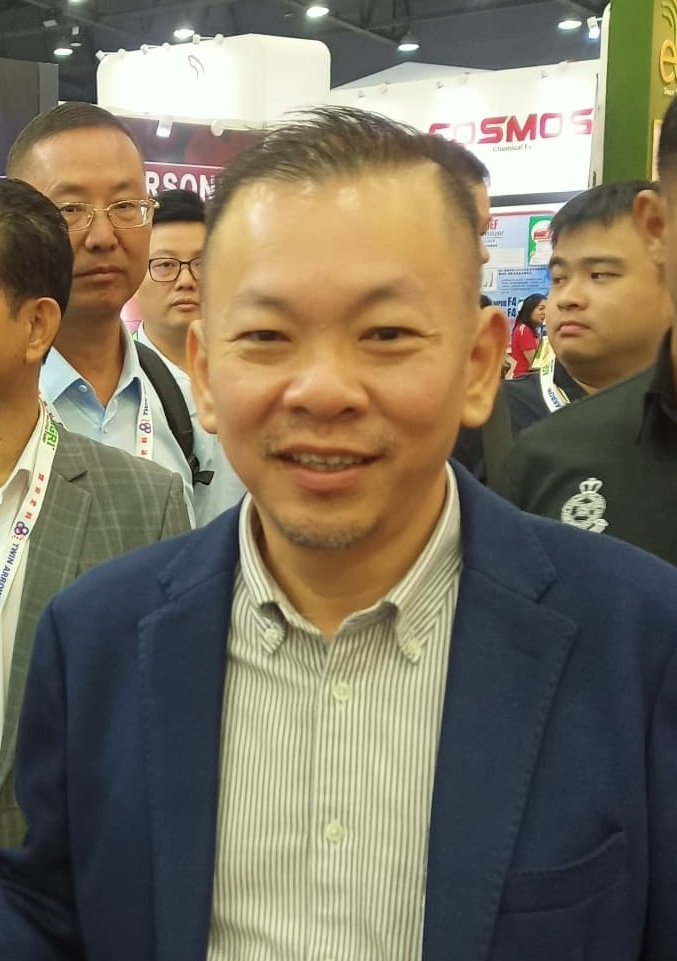
- Incumbent; Chan Foong Hin since 12 December 2023
- Ministry of Plantation and Commodities
- Style: Yang Berhormat
- Member of: Cabinet of Malaysia
- Reports to: Prime Minister; Minister of Plantation and Commodities
- Seat: Putrajaya
- Appointer: Yang di-Pertuan Agong on advice of the Prime Minister
- Term length: No fixed term
- Inaugural holder: Yusof Rawa (as Deputy Minister of Primary Industries)
- Formation: 1974

The Deputy Minister of Plantation and Commodities (Malay: Timbalan Menteri Perladangan dan Komoditi; Chinese: 种植园及商品部副部长; Tamil: பெருந்தோட்ட மற்றும் பொருட்கள் பிரதி அமைச்சர்) is a Malaysian cabinet position serving as a deputy head of the Ministry of Plantation and Commodities.

== List of Deputy Ministers of Plantation and Commodities ==
The following individuals have been appointed as Deputy Minister of Plantation and Commodities, or any of its precedent titles:

Colour key (for political coalition/parties):

Coalition	Component party	Timeline
Barisan Nasional (BN)	United Malays National Organisation (UMNO)	1973–present
Barisan Nasional (BN)	Malaysian Chinese Association (MCA)	1973–present
Barisan Nasional (BN)	Malaysian Indian Congress (MIC)	1973–present
Barisan Nasional (BN)	Malaysian Islamic Party (PAS)	1973–1977
Barisan Nasional (BN)	Parti Gerakan Rakyat Malaysia (Gerakan)	1973–2018
Barisan Nasional (BN)	Parti Pesaka Bumiputera Bersatu (PBB)	1973–2018
Gabungan Parti Sarawak (GPS)	Parti Pesaka Bumiputera Bersatu (PBB)	2018–present
Pakatan Harapan (PH)	People's Justice Party (PKR)	2015–present
Pakatan Harapan (PH)	Democratic Action Party (DAP)	2015–present
Perikatan Nasional (PN)	Malaysian United Indigenous Party (BERSATU)	2020–present

=== Deputy Minister of Primary Industries ===
Portrait	Name (Birth–Death) Constituency	Political coalition	Political party	Took office	Left office	Prime Minister (Cabinet)
	Yusof Rawa (1922–2000); MP for Kota Star Selatan	BN	PAS	1974	1976	Abdul Razak Hussein (I)
	Paul Leong Khee Seong (b.1939); MP for Taiping	BN	Gerakan	1976	1978	Abdul Razak Hussein (II); Hussein Onn (I)
	Bujang Ulis (b.?); MP for Simunjan	BN	PBB	1978	16 July 1984	Hussein Onn (II); Mahathir Mohamad (I • II)
	Megat Junid Megat Ayub (1942–2008); MP for Hilir Perak	BN	UMNO	16 July 1984	10 August 1986	Mahathir Mohamad (II)
	Mohd Radzi Sheikh Ahmad (b.1942); MP for Kangar	BN	UMNO	11 August 1986	20 May 1987	Mahathir Mohamad (III)
	Alias Md. Ali (1939–2014); MP for Hulu Terengganu	BN	UMNO	20 May 1987	26 October 1990	Mahathir Mohamad (III)
	Tengku Mahmud Tengku Mansor (?–?); MP for Setiu	BN	UMNO	27 October 1990	3 May 1995	Mahathir Mohamad (IIII)
	Siti Zainaboon Abu Bakar (?–?); MP for Tebrau	BN	UMNO	8 May 1995	12 November 1996	Mahathir Mohamad (V)
	Hishammuddin Hussein (b.1961); MP for Tenggara	BN	UMNO	12 November 1996	14 December 1999	Mahathir Mohamad (V)
	Anifah Aman (b.1953); MP for Beaufort	BN	UMNO	15 December 1999	26 March 2004	Mahathir Mohamad (VI); Abdullah Ahmad Badawi (I)
	Shamsul Iskandar Mohd Akin (b.1974); MP for Hang Tuah Jaya	PH	PKR	2 July 2018	24 February 2020	Mahathir Mohamad (VII)
Post renamed into Deputy Minister of Plantation Industries and Commodities
=== Deputy Minister of Plantation Industries and Commodities ===
Portrait	Name (Birth–Death) Constituency	Political coalition	Political party	Took office	Left office	Prime Minister (Cabinet)
	Anifah Aman (b.1953); MP for Kimanis	BN	UMNO	27 March 2004	18 March 2008	Abdullah Ahmad Badawi (II)
	Kohilan Pillay Appu (b.1967); Senator	BN	Gerakan	19 March 2008	9 April 2009	Abdullah Ahmad Badawi (III)
	Hamzah Zainudin (b.1957); MP for Larut	BN	UMNO	10 April 2009	15 May 2013	Najib Razak (I)
	Palanivel Govindasamy (1949–2025); Senator	BN	MIC	4 June 2010	9 August 2011	Najib Razak (I)
	Noriah Kasnon (1964–2016); MP for Sungai Besar	BN	UMNO	16 May 2013	5 May 2016	Najib Razak (II)
	Datu Nasrun Datu Mansur (b.?); MP for Silam	BN	UMNO	27 June 2016	9 May 2018	Najib Razak (II)
	Willie Mongin (b.?); MP for Puncak Borneo	PN	BERSATU	10 March 2020	16 August 2021	Muhyiddin Yassin (I)
	Wee Jeck Seng (b.1964); MP for Tanjung Piai	BN	MCA	10 March 2020	16 August 2021	Muhyiddin Yassin (I)
	Wee Jeck Seng (b.1964); MP for Tanjung Piai	BN	MCA	30 August 2021	24 November 2022	Ismail Sabri Yaakob (I)
	Willie Mongin (b.?); MP for Puncak Borneo	GPS	PBB	30 August 2021	24 November 2022	Ismail Sabri Yaakob (I)
Post renamed into Deputy Minister of Plantation and Commodities
=== Deputy Minister of Plantation and Commodities ===
Portrait	Name (Birth–Death) Constituency	Political coalition	Political party	Took office	Left office	Prime Minister (Cabinet)
	Siti Aminah Aching (b.1964); MP for Beaufort	BN	UMNO	10 December 2022	12 December 2023	Anwar Ibrahim (I)
	Chan Foong Hin (b.1978); MP for Kota Kinabalu	PH	DAP	12 December 2023	Incumbent	Anwar Ibrahim (I)

== See also ==
- Minister of Plantation and Commodities (Malaysia)
