= Ng Lip Yong =

Malaysian politician

- 吴立洋

Deputy Minister of International Trade and Industry II
- In office 14 February 2006 – 18 March 2008 Serving with Ahmad Husni Hanadzlah (Deputy Minister of International Trade and Industry I)
- Minister: Rafidah Aziz
- Preceded by: Mah Siew Keong
- Succeeded by: Jacob Dungau Sagan

Member of the Malaysian Parliament for Batu
- In office 29 November 1999 – 8 March 2008
- Preceded by: Chong Chek Ah (BN–Gerakan)
- Succeeded by: Chua Tian Chang (PR–PKR)

Personal details
- Born: 1950 (age 75–76)
- Party: Parti Gerakan Rakyat Malaysia (Gerakan)
- Other political affiliations: Barisan Nasional (BN); Perikatan Nasional (PN)

Ng Lip Yong is a Malaysian politician. He served as Deputy Minister of International Trade and Industry II in the Barisan Nasional (BN) administration under Prime Minister Abdullah Ahmad Badawi from February 2006 to March 2008 alongside Ahmad Husni Hanadzlah as Deputy Minister of International Trade and Industry I and Minister Rafidah Aziz as well as Member of Parliament (MP) for Batu from November 1999 to March 2008.

== Post career ==
Ng Lip Yong currently serves as an Independent Non-Executive Director in Industrial and Commercial Bank of China (Malaysia) in charge of Nomination and Remuneration Committee as well as a Member of Audit Committee and Board Risk Management Committee appointed on 7 February 2019. He has also served as Honorary Advisor of Malaysia-China Chamber of Commerce.

== Election results ==
Parliament of Malaysia
| Year | Constituency | Candidate | Votes | Pct | Opponent(s) | Votes | Pct | Ballots cast | Majority | Turnout |
|---|---|---|---|---|---|---|---|---|---|---|
| 1999 | P104 Batu | Ng Lip Yong (Gerakan) | 22,639 | 52.67% | Sanusi Osman (PRM) | 20,342 | 47.33% | 44,916 | 2,297 | 73.53% |
| 2004 | P115 Batu | Ng Lip Yong (Gerakan) | 28,718 | 62.54% | Chua Tian Chang (PKR) | 17,201 | 37.46% | 46,228 | 11,517 | 68.33% |
