= Siti Kasim =

Malaysian human rights lawyer and activist

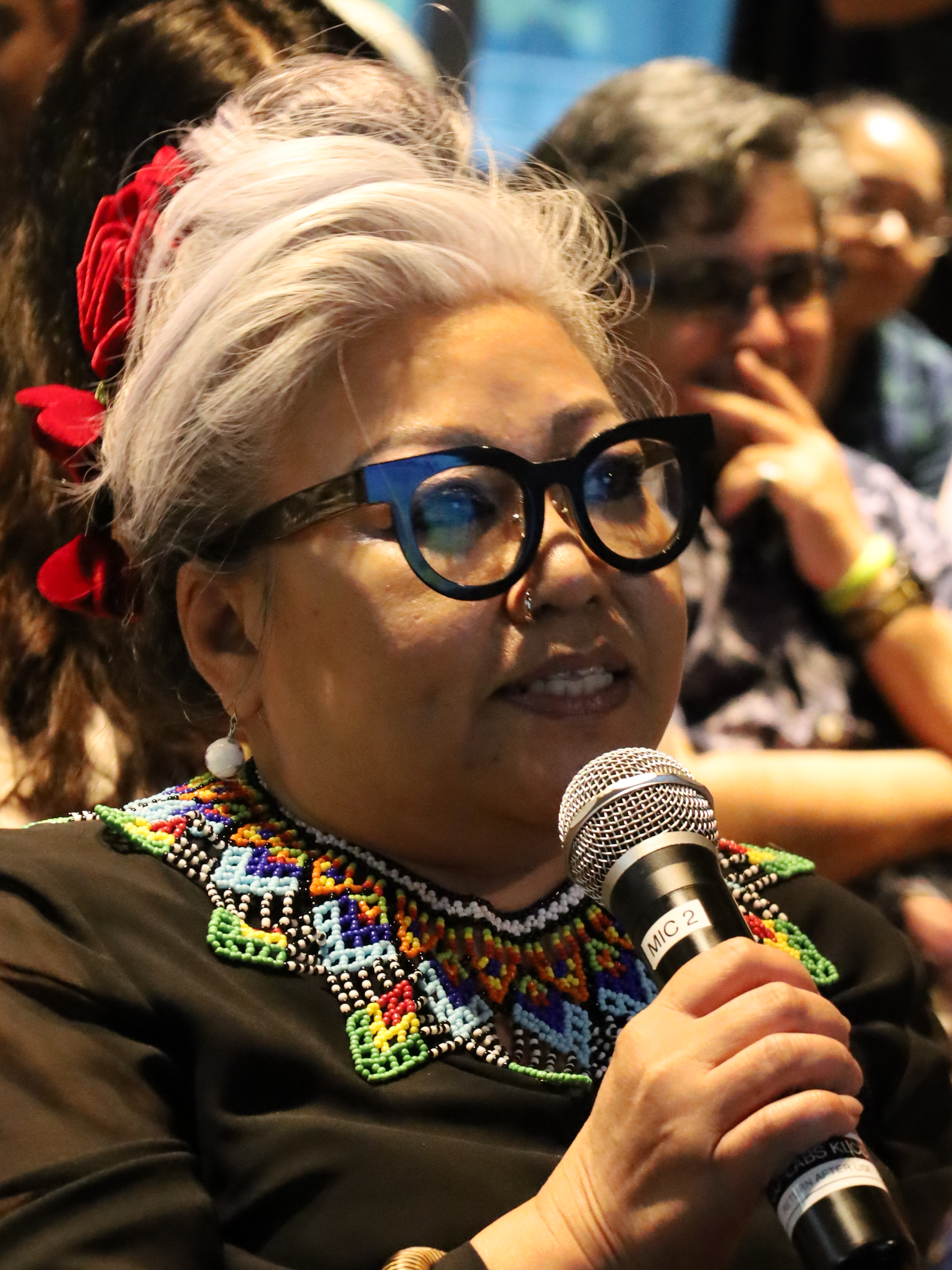
- Siti Kasim in 2026
- Born: Siti Zabedah Kasim; 10 May 1963 (age 63); Malacca, Federation of Malaya
- Education: Mara Institute of Technology; Queen Mary University of London
- Occupation: Lawyer
- Known for: Human rights activism
- Political party: Parti Bangsa Malaysia
- Children: 1
- Website: Official website

Siti Kasim is a Malaysian human rights lawyer and activist. She came to national prominence with her work within the Human Rights Committee of the Malaysian Bar highlighting the issues being faced by the indigenous peoples of Malaysia. Her work has since grown to encompass defending the rights of other minority and marginalised communities of Malaysia, and championing the ideal of an inclusive and progressive Malaysian society. She has spoken of the criticism and abuse directed at her due to her outspoken and unapologetic demeanour.

== Career ==
=== Politics ===
Siti Kasim launched her political career at the 15th general elections of Malaysia as an independent candidate aligned with the Gerak Independent movement. Tracing the root of the malaise within the Malaysian political and social landscape to excessive intertwining of government and religious affairs, she made the separation of state and religion a key pillar of her campaign. She was contesting the parliamentary constituency of Batu against nine other candidates. Siti gained only 653 or 0.75% of the votes, ranking 6th out of the nine candidates contesting the constituency, losing to Prabakaran Parameswaran who won with a majority of 22,241.

On 2 October 2026, Siti Kasim announced that she has joined Parti Bangsa Malaysia. She said that while she has joined a political party for the first time, she will remain independent.

== Incident ==
=== Bomb threat ===
On 21 July 2023, a suspicious object was discovered on the rear tyre of Siti Kasim's Toyota Celica when she sent the car for servicing. Brickfields police chief Assistant Commissioner Amihizam Abdul Shukor confirmed that the object was an improvised explosive device and an investigation is under way.

== Election results ==
Parliament of Malaysia
Year	Constituency	Candidate	Votes	Pct	Opponent(s)	Votes	Pct	Ballots cast	Majority	Turnout
2022	P115 Batu	Siti Zabedah Kasim (IND)	653	0.75%	Prabakaran Parameswaran (PKR)	45,716	52.46%	87,841	22,241	76.54%
2022	P115 Batu	Siti Zabedah Kasim (IND)	653	0.75%	Azhar Yahya (PAS)	23,475	26.94%	87,841	22,241	76.54%
2022	P115 Batu	Siti Zabedah Kasim (IND)	653	0.75%	A. Kohilan Pillay (MIC)	10,398	11.93%	87,841	22,241	76.54%
2022	P115 Batu	Siti Zabedah Kasim (IND)	653	0.75%	Chua Tian Chang (IND)	4,603	5.28%	87,841	22,241	76.54%
2022	P115 Batu	Siti Zabedah Kasim (IND)	653	0.75%	Wan Azliana Wan Adnan (PEJUANG)	849	0.97%	87,841	22,241	76.54%
2022	P115 Batu	Siti Zabedah Kasim (IND)	653	0.75%	Nur Fathiah Syazwana Shaharuddin (IND)	628	0.72%	87,841	22,241	76.54%
2022	P115 Batu	Siti Zabedah Kasim (IND)	653	0.75%	Naganathan Pillai (WARISAN)	525	0.66%	87,841	22,241	76.54%
2022	P115 Batu	Siti Zabedah Kasim (IND)	653	0.75%	Zulkifli Abdul Fadlan (PRM)	137	0.16%	87,841	22,241	76.54%
2022	P115 Batu	Siti Zabedah Kasim (IND)	653	0.75%	Too Cheng Huat @ Too Gao Lan (IND)	112	0.13%	87,841	22,241	76.54%
