= Richard Riot Jaem =

Malaysian politician (born 1951)

Yang Berhormat Dato' Sri Richard Riot Jaem PJN SSAP PNBS JBS KMN MP

Special Envoy of the Prime Minister to East Asia
- In office 15 May 2020 – 24 November 2022
- Monarch: Abdullah
- Prime Minister: Muhyiddin Yassin (2020–2021); Ismail Sabri Yaakob (2021–2022)
- Preceded by: Tiong King Sing

Minister of Human Resources
- In office 16 May 2013 – 10 May 2018
- Monarchs: Abdul Halim (2013–2016); Muhammad V (2016–2018)
- Prime Minister: Najib Razak
- Deputy: Ismail Muttalib
- Preceded by: Subramaniam Sathasivam
- Succeeded by: M. Kulasegaran

Deputy Minister of Foreign Affairs
- In office 4 June 2010 – 15 May 2013 Serving with Kohilan Pillay Appu
- Monarchs: Mizan Zainal Abidin (2010–2011); Abdul Halim (2011–2013)
- Prime Minister: Najib Razak
- Minister: Anifah Aman
- Preceded by: Lee Chee Leong
- Succeeded by: Hamzah Zainuddin

Member of the Malaysian Parliament for Serian
- Incumbent
- Assumed office 21 October 1990
- Preceded by: Lainus Andrew Luwak (Independent)
- Majority: 2,685 (1990); 7,554 (1995); 8,451 (1999); 9,695 (2004); 13,427 (2008); 13,151 (2013); 9,905 (2018); 16,697 (2022)

Deputy President of the Sarawak United Peoples' Party
- Incumbent
- Assumed office 12 December 2011 Serving with Lee Kim Shin
- President: Peter Chin Fah Kui (2011–2014); Sim Kui Hian (since 2014)
- Preceded by: Law Hieng Ding

Personal details
- Born: Richard Riot anak Jaem; 1 December 1951 (age 74) Serian, Crown Colony of Sarawak
- Party: Sarawak United Peoples' Party (SUPP)
- Other political affiliations: Barisan Nasional (BN) (until 2018); Gabungan Parti Sarawak (GPS) (since 2018)
- Spouse: Mincha @ Kayen Lingeng
- Education: Preston University
- Occupation: Politician

Richard Riot anak Jaem (born 1 December 1951) is a Malaysian politician who served as the Special Envoy of the Prime Minister to East Asia from 2020 until 2022. A deputy president of Sarawak United Peoples' Party (SUPP), he has represented Serian in the Parliament of Malaysia since 1990.

Born in Serian. He previously was the Minister of Human Resources and Deputy Minister of Foreign Affairs under former Prime Minister Najib Razak and former Minister Anifah Aman from 2010 to 2018. He has also served the Chairman of the Sarawak Rivers Board (SRB).

== Political career ==
=== Party posts ===
During SUPP's triennial assembly in 2011, Riot was elected as the party's first non-Chinese deputy president.

=== Parliamentary career ===
Riot first contested and won the Serian parliamentary seat in 1990 as an independent candidate. He was later re-elected for six consecutive terms beginning in 1995, all on a Barisan Nasional ticket.

=== Ministerial career ===
After serving for more than 20 years as a government backbencher, Riot was appointed as Deputy Minister of Foreign Affairs in a minor cabinet reshuffle on 1 June 2010.

In 2013 he was promoted to a full ministerial position as Minister for Human Resources.

== Controversy ==
After the 12th Malaysian general election in March 2008, there was speculation that Riot would defect to the opposition People's Justice Party (PKR); however, Riot denied the speculation and the move did not materialised.

In September 2017, Riot was engulfed in a corruption allegation after RM40 million was found to be missing from the Skills Development Fund Corporation (SDFC) under the Ministry of Human Resources which he helmed as its minister. Among those arrested by the Malaysian Anti-Corruption Commission (MACC) included his political secretary. Riot himself was called in by the MACC and questioned for 10 hours.

Following the historic 14th Malaysian general election in May 2018 which saw the fall of the BN coalition from power, rumours swirled around with speculation that Riot was looking to, yet again, join the PKR, which was now a component party of the ruling Alliance of Hope (PH) coalition. This was denied by PKR Sarawak state liaison committee chairperson Baru Bian. Moreover, PH Sarawak chairperson, Chong Chieng Jen, advised his allied parties against accepting Riot in a statement declaring that his own, the Democratic Action Party (DAP), will not.

Less than a year later in February 2019, Riot was again surrounded by speculation that he may jump ship, this time to the United Sarawak Party (PSB) which is a splinter party of the SUPP.

On 29 February during the 2020 Malaysian political crisis, Riot was reported to have left SUPP to join PKR again. Somehow the inaccurate rumour was quickly quashed after a video clip of him denying the claims went viral the next day.

== Election results ==
Parliament of Malaysia
Year	Constituency	Candidate	Votes	Pct	Opponent(s)	Votes	Pct	Ballots cast	Majority	Turnout
1990	P160 Serian	Richard Riot Jaem (IND)	10,349	57.45%	William Aham	7,664	42.55%	18,516	2,685	66.93%
1995	P172 Serian	Richard Riot Jaem (SUPP)	12,116	60.26%	Marcellus Munjan (IND)	4,562	22.69%	20,690	7,554	65.40%
1995	P172 Serian	Richard Riot Jaem (SUPP)	12,116	60.26%	Michael Runin (PBS)	1,753	8.72%	20,690	7,554	65.40%
1995	P172 Serian	Richard Riot Jaem (SUPP)	12,116	60.26%	Andrew Nyabe (IND)	959	4.77%	20,690	7,554	65.40%
1995	P172 Serian	Richard Riot Jaem (SUPP)	12,116	60.26%	Betram Sading Jihok (IND)	716	3.56%	20,690	7,554	65.40%
1999	P173 Serian	Richard Riot Jaem (SUPP)	12,491	71.77%	Anthony Polycarp Munjan (STAR)	4,040	23.21%	17,974	8,451	59.76%
1999	P173 Serian	Richard Riot Jaem (SUPP)	12,491	71.77%	Shamsuddin Abdullah @ Pok Ungkut (IND)	872	5.01%	17,974	8,451	59.76%
2004	P199 Serian	Richard Riot Jaem (SUPP)	13,960	76.60%	Henry Ginai Langgie (IND)	4,265	23.40%	18,686	9,695	59.13%
2008	P199 Serian	Richard Riot Jaem (SUPP)	15,793	86.97%	Belayong Jayang (SNAP)	2,366	13.03%	18,516	13,427	66.36%
2013	P199 Serian	Richard Riot Jaem (SUPP)	19,494	74.33%	Edward Andrew Luak (DAP)	6,343	24.19%	26,562	13,151	78.79%
2013	P199 Serian	Richard Riot Jaem (SUPP)	19,494	74.33%	Johnny Bob Aput (STAR)	390	1.49%	26,562	13,151	78.79%
2018	P199 Serian	Richard Riot Jaem (SUPP)	17,545	63.99%	Edward Andrew Luak (DAP)	7,640	27.86%	27,880	9,905	74.09%
2018	P199 Serian	Richard Riot Jaem (SUPP)	17,545	63.99%	Senior William Rade (IND)	2,234	8.15%	27,880	9,905	74.09%
2022	P199 Serian	Richard Riot Jaem (SUPP)	22,876	57.23%	Alim Impira (IND)	6,179	15.46%	40,620	16,697	61.24%
2022	P199 Serian	Richard Riot Jaem (SUPP)	22,876	57.23%	Elsiy Tinggang (PSB)	5,630	14.08%	40,620	16,697	61.24%
2022	P199 Serian	Richard Riot Jaem (SUPP)	22,876	57.23%	Learry Jabul (DAP)	5,289	13.23%	40,620	16,697	61.24%

== Honours ==
=== Honours of Malaysia ===
- Malaysia
  - Commander of the Order of Meritorious Service (PJN) – Datuk (2005)
  - Officer of the Order of the Defender of the Realm (KMN) (1997)
  - Recipient of the 17th Yang di-Pertuan Agong Installation Medal (2025)
- Sarawak
  - Knight Commander of the Most Exalted Order of the Star of Sarawak (PNBS) – Dato Sri (2017)
  - Companion of the Most Exalted Order of the Star of Sarawak (JBS) (1998)
  - Gold Medal of the Sarawak Independence Diamond Jubilee Medal (2023)
- Pahang
  - Grand Knight of the Order of Sultan Ahmad Shah of Pahang (SSAP) – Dato' Sri (2013)

== See also ==
- List of longest-serving members of the Parliament of Malaysia

Political offices
Preceded by Subramaniam Sathasivam	Minister of Human Resources (Malaysia); 2013–2018	Succeeded by Murugesan Kulasegaran
Preceded by Lee Chee Leong	Deputy Minister of Foreign Affairs (Malaysia); 2010–2013	Succeeded by Hamzah Zainuddin
Parliament of Malaysia
Preceded by Lainus Andrew Luwak	Member of Parliament for Serian; 1990–present	Incumbent
Party political offices
Preceded by Law Hieng Ding	Deputy President of Sarawak United Peoples' Party; 2011–present	Incumbent
