= Serian (federal constituency) =

Federal constituency of Sarawak, Malaysia

Serian (P199)
Sarawak constituency

Federal constituency
- Legislature: Dewan Rakyat
- MP: Richard Riot Jaem; GPS
- Constituency created: 1968
- First contested: 1969
- Last contested: 2022

Demographics
- Population (2020): 61,744
- Electors (2022): 65,273
- Area (km²): 1,463
- Pop. density (per km²): 42.2

Serian is a federal constituency in Serian Division (Siburan District, Tebedu District and Serian District), Sarawak, Malaysia, that has been represented in the Dewan Rakyat since 1971.

The federal constituency was created in the 1968 redistribution and is mandated to return a single member to the Dewan Rakyat under the first past the post voting system.

== Demographics ==
https://ge15.orientaldaily.com.my/seats/sarawak/p

Ethnic breakdown of Serian's electorate as of 2022
1. Sarawak bumiputera (79.0%)
2. Chinese (10.3%)
3. Malay-Muslim bumiputera (9.70%)
4. Other ethnicities (1.00%)

As of 2020, Serian has a population of 61,744 people.

Age breakdown of Serian's electorate as of 2022
1. 18-20 (6.35%)
2. 21-29 (19.9%)
3. 30-39 (20.5%)
4. 40-49 (17.4%)
5. 50-59 (16.8%)
6. 60-69 (11.8%)
7. 70-79 (5.40%)
8. 80-89 (1.53%)
9. above 90 (0.41%)
Gender breakdown of Serian's electorate as of 2022
1. Male (50.8%)
2. Female (49.2%)

== History ==
=== Polling districts ===
According to the gazette issued on 31 October 2022, the Serian constituency has a total of 15 polling districts.

State constituency	Polling Districts	Code	Location
Tebedu（N21）	Bentang	199/21/01	SK All St. Plaman Nyabet; SK St. John Taee; SK Parunsuan
Tebedu（N21）	Lanchang	199/21/02	SK St. Mathew Lanchang; SK St. Dominic Pichin
Tebedu（N21）	Tebedu	199/21/03	SK Tepoi; SK Temong; SK Entubuh; SK Sejijag; SK Tebedu; SK Sungan; SK Tema; SK Sg. Semaran
Tebedu（N21）	Amo	199/21/04	SK Gahat Mawang; Bangunan Kelas Tadika Bidak; SK Reteh; SK Mawang Taup; Balai Raya Kujang Sain; Balai Raya Kpg. Kujang Mawang; SK Kujang Mawang; SK Tesu; Bilik Gerakan JKKK Kpg. Daha Seroban; Balai Raya Kpg. Daga Kisau
Tebedu（N21）	Mengarat	199/21/05	SK Lobang Batu; SK Krusen
Kedup (N22)	Sibauh	199/22/01	SK St. Anthony Kawan; Dewan Serbaguna Kpg Mayang Mawang; Dewan Babuk Salim; Balai Raya Kpg. Bugu; Balai Raya Kpg. Prangkan Marung; SK Sg. Rimu; SK St. John Mentong; SK Mubok Berawan; Dewan Serbaguna Kpg Pridan; Balai Raya Kpg. Sanggai Mawang
Kedup (N22)	Mongkos	199/22/02	SK Mentu Tapu; SK St. Michael Mongkos; Multipurpose Hall Kpg Mongkos; Tadika Kpg. Nibong; SK St. Nobert Paom Gahat
Kedup (N22)	Kedup	199/22/03	SK Mapu; Balai Raya Kpg. Terbat Leban; Balai Raya Babuk Barem Kpg. Bunan Gega
Kedup (N22)	Antayan	199/22/04	SK Krangan; SK Merbau; Balai Raya Kpg. Sg. Buru; SK Krait; SK Sumpas; SJK (C) Sg. Menyan; SK Entayan; SK Semukoi
Bukit Semuja (N23)	Sedihan	199/23/01	Balai Raya Kpg. Tebakang Dayak; SK Tebakang; Balai Raya Sorah Dayak; SK Pangkalan Sorah; SK koran
Bukit Semuja (N23)	Triboh	199/23/02	SK Merakai; Balai Raya Kpg. Kuala; SK Lebor Remun; SK Bedup; SK Melansai; SK Pengkalan Bedup
Bukit Semuja (N23)	Selabi	199/23/03	SK Riih Daso; Balai Raya Kpg. Riih Mawang; SK St. Patrick Tangga; Balai Raya Kpg. Rasau; SK St. Henry Selabi; Balai Raya Kpg. Seroban; SK Serian
Bukit Semuja (N23)	Pasar Serian	199/23/04	SJK (C) Chung Hua Serian
Bukit Semuja (N23)	Kakai	199/23/05	Balai Raya Kpg. Kakai
Bukit Semuja (N23)	Serian Hulu	199/23/06	Stadium Bola Keranjang Tertutup (Majlis Daerah Serian)

=== Representation history ===
Members of Parliament for Serian
Parliament	No	Years	Member	Party
Constituency created
		1969-1971	Parliament was suspended	
3rd	P126	1971-1974	Rahun Debak	SNAP
4th	P136	1974-1978	Richard Damping Laki	BN (SUPP)
5th	P136	1978-1982	Richard Damping Laki	BN (SUPP)
6th	P136	1982-1986	Richard Damping Laki	BN (SUPP)
7th	P159	1986-1990	Lainus Andrew Luwak	Independent
8th	P160	1990-1995	Richard Riot Jaem	Independent
9th	P172	1995-1999	Richard Riot Jaem	BN (SUPP)
10th	P173	1999-2004	Richard Riot Jaem	BN (SUPP)
11th	P179	2004-2008	Richard Riot Jaem	BN (SUPP)
12th	P199	2008-2013	Richard Riot Jaem	BN (SUPP)
13th	P199	2013-2018	Richard Riot Jaem	BN (SUPP)
14th	P199	2018	Richard Riot Jaem	BN (SUPP)
14th	P199	2018–2022	Richard Riot Jaem	GPS (SUPP)
15th	P199	2022-present	Richard Riot Jaem	GPS (SUPP)

=== State constituency ===
Parliamentary constituency	State constituency					
Parliamentary constituency	1969–1978	1978–1990	1990–1999	1999–2008	2008–2016	2016−present
Serian						Bukit Semuja
Serian				Kedup		
Serian	Tarat					
Serian	Tebakang					
Serian			Tebedu			

=== Historical boundaries ===
State Constituency	Area					
State Constituency	1966	1977	1987	1996	2005	2015
Bukit Semuja						Bukit Semuja; Kampung Ampungan; Kampung Sorak; Serian; Tebakang
Kedup				Balai Ringin; Kampung Tana Buda; Kedup; Serian; Simpang Simunjan	Entayan; Kampung Tana Buda; Kedup; Serian; Sungai Engkabang	Entayan; Kampung Mongkos; Kedup; Sungai Engkabang; Sungai Kerait
Tarat	Baki Lama; Kampung Kakai; Kampung Kakeng; Tarat; Tebedu	Baki Lama; Kampung Menaul; Kampung Sungai Mawang; Serian; Tarat	Baki Lama; Bukit Semuja; Kampung Sungai Mawang; Serian; Tarat			
Tebakang	Balai Ringin; Bukit Semuja; Menyan Cina; Serian; Tebakang	Balai Ringin; Menyan Cina; Simpang Simunjan; Tebakang; Tebedu				
Tebedu			Balai Ringin; Kampung Kakeng; Kampung Telagus; Tebakang; Tebedu	Kampung Bantang; Kampung Jenan; Kampung Mayang; Kampung Sungan; Tebedu		

=== Current state assembly members ===
No.	State Constituency	Member	Ccoalition (Party)
N21	Tebedu	Simon Sinang @ Sinang Bada	GPS (PBB)
N22	Kedup	Maclaine Ben @ Martin Ben	GPS (PBB)
N23	Bukit Semuja	John Ilus	GPS (PBB)

=== Local governments & postcodes ===
No.	State Constituency	Local Government	Postcode
N21	Tebedu	Serian District Council	94700, 94750, 94760 Serian
N22	Kedup	Serian District Council	94700, 94750, 94760 Serian
N23	Bukit Semuja	Serian District Council	94700, 94750, 94760 Serian

== Election results ==
Malaysian general election, 2022
Party	Candidate	Votes	%	∆%
GPS	Richard Riot Jaem	22,876	57.23	▲57.23
Independent	Alim Impira	6,179	15.46	▲15.46
PSB	Elsiy Tinggang	5,630	14.08	▲14.08
DAP	Learry Jabul	5,289	13.23	▼14.66
Total valid votes		39,974	100.00	
Total rejected ballots		511		
Unreturned ballots		135		
Turnout		40,620	61.24	▼12.85
Registered electors		65,273		
Majority		16,697	41.77	▲5.65
GPS gain from BN		Swing		?
Source(s) https://lom.agc.gov.my/ilims/upload/portal/akta/outputp/1753265/PARLIMEN%20SARAWAK%20(PUB%20620).pdf

Malaysian general election, 2018
Party	Candidate	Votes	%	∆%
BN	Richard Riot Jaem	17,545	63.99	▼10.34
DAP	Edward Andrew Luwak	7,640	27.86	▲3.67
Independent	Senior William Rade	2,234	8.15	▲8.15
Total valid votes		27,419	100.00	
Total rejected ballots		385		
Unreturned ballots		76		
Turnout		27,880	74.09	▼4.70
Registered electors		37,629		
Majority		9,905	36.12	▼14.02
BN hold		Swing		
Source(s) "His Majesty's Government Gazette - Notice of Contested Election, Parliament for the State of Sarawak [P.U. (B) 247/2018]" (PDF). Attorney General's Chambers of Malaysia. 3 May 2018. "Federal Government Gazette - Results of Contested Election and Statements of the Poll after the Official Addition of Votes, Parliamentary Constituencies for the State of Sarawak [P.U. (B) 321/2018]" (PDF). Attorney General's Chambers of Malaysia. 28 May 2018.

Malaysian general election, 2013
Party	Candidate	Votes	%	∆%
BN	Richard Riot Jaem	19,494	74.33	▼12.64
DAP	Edward Andrew Luwak	6,343	24.19	▲24.19
STAR	Johnny Bob Aput	390	1.49	▲1.49
Total valid votes		26,227	100.00	
Total rejected ballots		296		
Unreturned ballots		39		
Turnout		26,562	78.79	▲12.43
Registered electors		33,713		
Majority		13,151	50.14	▼23.80
BN hold		Swing		
Source(s) "Federal Government Gazette - Notice of Contested Election, Parliament for the State of Sarawak [P.U. (B) 184/2013]" (PDF). Attorney General's Chambers of Malaysia. 26 April 2013. Archived from the original (PDF) on 2018-09-30. "Federal Government Gazette - Results of Contested Election and Statements of the Poll after the Official Addition of Votes, Parliamentary Constituencies for the State of Sarawak [P.U. (B) 225/2013]" (PDF). Attorney General's Chambers of Malaysia. 22 May 2013. Archived from the original (PDF) on 2018-09-30.

Malaysian general election, 2008
Party	Candidate	Votes	%	∆%
BN	Richard Riot Jaem	15,793	86.97	▲10.37
SNAP	Belayong Jayang	2,366	13.03	▲13.03
Total valid votes		18,159	100.00	
Total rejected ballots		332		
Unreturned ballots		25		
Turnout		18,516	66.36	▲7.23
Registered electors		27,901		
Majority		13,427	73.94	▲20.74
BN hold		Swing		

Malaysian general election, 2004
Party	Candidate	Votes	%	∆%
BN	Richard Riot Jaem	13,960	76.60	▲4.83
Independent	Henry Ginai Langgie	4,265	23.40	▲23.40
Total valid votes		18,225	100.00	
Total rejected ballots		372		
Unreturned ballots		89		
Turnout		18,686	59.13	▼0.63
Registered electors		31,601		
Majority		9,695	53.20	▲4.64
BN hold		Swing		

Malaysian general election, 1999
Party	Candidate	Votes	%	∆%
BN	Richard Riot Jaem	12,491	71.77	▲11.51
STAR	Anthony Polycarp Munjan	4,040	23.21	▲23.21
Independent	Shamsuddin Abdullah @ Pok Ungkut	872	5.01	▲5.01
Total valid votes		17,403	100.00	
Total rejected ballots		451		
Unreturned ballots		120		
Turnout		17,974	59.76	▼5.64
Registered electors		30,076		
Majority		8,451	48.56	▲10.99
BN hold		Swing		

Malaysian general election, 1995
Party	Candidate	Votes	%	∆%
BN	Richard Riot Jaem	12,116	60.26	▲17.71
Independent	Marcellus Munjan @ Eric Marcel Munjan	4,562	22.69	▲22.69
PBS	Michael Runin	1,753	8.72	▲8.72
Independent	Andrew Nyabe	959	4.77	▲4.77
Independent	Betram Sading Jihok	716	3.56	▲3.56
Total valid votes		20,106	100.00	
Total rejected ballots		468		
Unreturned ballots		116		
Turnout		20,690	65.40	▼1.53
Registered electors		31,636		
Majority		7,554	37.57	▲22.67
BN gain from Independent		Swing		?

Malaysian general election, 1990
Party	Candidate	Votes	%	∆%
Independent	Richard Riot Jaem	10,349	57.45	▲57.45
BN	William Aham	7,664	42.55	▼3.57
Total valid votes		18,013	100.00	
Total rejected ballots		503		
Unreturned ballots		0		
Turnout		18,516	66.93	▲1.64
Registered electors		27,663		
Majority		2,685	14.90	▲7.14
Independent hold		Swing		

Malaysian general election, 1986
Party	Candidate	Votes	%	∆%
Independent	Lainus Andrew Luwak	9,871	53.88	▲53.88
BN	Richard Damping Laki	8,451	46.12	▼6.28
Total valid votes		18,322	100.00	
Total rejected ballots		653		
Unreturned ballots		0		
Turnout		18,975	65.29	▼0.79
Registered electors		29,063		
Majority		1,420	7.76	▼5.98
Independent gain from BN		Swing		?

Malaysian general election, 1982
Party	Candidate	Votes	%	∆%
BN	Richard Damping Laki	8,419	52.40	▼8.25
Independent	Nelson Kundai	5,555	34.57	▲34.57
Independent	Venom Nyana Juram	1,360	8.46	▲8.46
Independent	Tan Yam Hui	734	4.57	▲4.57
Total valid votes		16,068	100.00	
Total rejected ballots		772		
Unreturned ballots		0		
Turnout		16,840	66.08	▼6.35
Registered electors		25,483		
Majority		2,864	17.83	▼3.47
BN hold		Swing		

Malaysian general election, 1978
Party	Candidate	Votes	%	∆%
BN	Richard Damping Laki	7,050	60.65	▲13.06
Parti Umat Sarawak	Nelson Kundai Ngareng	4,574	39.35	▲39.35
Total valid votes		11,624	100.00	
Total rejected ballots		1,035		
Unreturned ballots		0		
Turnout		15,972	72.43	▼8.74
Registered electors		22,052		
Majority		2,476	21.30	▲19.79
BN hold		Swing		

Malaysian general election, 1974
Party	Candidate	Votes	%	∆%
BN	Richard Damping Laki	6,716	47.59	▲47.59
SNAP	Rahun Debak	6,503	46.08	▲2.38
Independent	Bong Kim Yuh	892	6.32	▲6.32
Total valid votes		14,111	100.00	
Total rejected ballots		1,235		
Unreturned ballots		0		
Turnout		15,346	81.17	▼7.87
Registered electors		18,905		
Majority		213	1.51	▼13.11
BN gain from SNAP		Swing		?

Malaysian general election, 1969
Party	Candidate	Votes	%
SNAP	Rahun Debak	6,001	43.70
SUPP	Peter Ng Eng Lim	3,993	29.08
PBB	Dominic Andrew Dago Randan	3,737	27.22
Total valid votes		13,731	100.00
Total rejected ballots		835	
Unreturned ballots		0	
Turnout		14,566	89.04
Registered electors		16,359	
Majority		2,008	14.62
This was a new constituency created.
