= Batu (Kuala Lumpur federal constituency) =

Malaysian federal constituency

Batu (P115)
Kuala Lumpur constituency

Federal constituency
- Legislature: Dewan Rakyat
- MP: Prabakaran Parameswaran; PH
- Constituency created: 1984
- First contested: 1986
- Last contested: 2022

Demographics
- Population (2020): 219,132
- Electors (2022): 113,863
- Area (km²): 20
- Pop. density (per km²): 10,956.6

Batu is a federal constituency in the Federal Territory of Kuala Lumpur, Malaysia, that has been represented in the Dewan Rakyat since 1986.

The federal constituency was created in the 1984 redistribution and is mandated to return a single member to the Dewan Rakyat under the first past the post voting system.

== Demographics ==
吉隆坡国席 Kuala Lumpur - 马来西亚第15届全国大选 | 中國報

Ethnic breakdown of Batu's electorate as of 2022
1. Malay (44.1%)
2. Chinese (34.5%)
3. Indian (18.2%)
4. Other ethnicities (3.20%)
Age breakdown of Batu's electorate as of 2022
1. 18-20 (5.78%)
2. 21-29 (20.4%)
3. 30-39 (22.9%)
4. 40-49 (17.5%)
5. 50-59 (14.4%)
6. 60-69 (11.8%)
7. 70-79 (5.19%)
8. 80-89 (1.62%)
9. above 90 (0.38%)
Gender breakdown of Batu's electorate as of 2022
1. Male (49.8%)
2. Female (50.2%)

== History ==
=== Polling districts ===
According to the gazette issued on 31 October 2022, the Batu constituency has a total of 23 polling districts.

Polling District	Code	Location
Kampung Selayang Lama	115/00/01	SK Kg. Selayang
Taman Sri Murni	115/00/02	SK Seri Murni
Taman Intan Baiduri	115/00/03	SK Intan Baiduri
Taman Beringin	115/00/04	Sekolah Integrasi Rendah Agama Jabatan Agama Islam Wilayah Persekutuan (SIRAJ) Abu Bzae Al-Ghifari
Taman Wahyu	115/00/05	SK Seri Delima
Taman Batu Permai	115/00/06	SMK Dato' Ibrahim Yaacob
Taman Batu Muda	115/00/07	SK Batu Muda
Batu Muda	115/00/08	SMK Batu Muda
Taman Koperasi Fasa II	115/00/09	SK Taman Koperasi Polis
Batu Kentonmen	115/00/10	SK Kampung Batu
Pekan Batu	115/00/11	SK (1) Batu 4 Jalan Ipoh; SK (2) Batu 4 Jalan Ipoh
Taman Rainbow	115/00/12	SJK (C) Lai Chee
Taman Million	115/00/13	SM (Persendirian) Chong Hwa
Sentul Pasar	115/00/14	SMK Convent Sentul
Sentul Jaya	115/00/15	SK Sentul 1
Sentul Utara	115/00/16	SRA Ibnu Hajar Al-'Asqalani (SRA Raudhatul Muttaqin), Taman Dato' Senu
Pekan Setapak	115/00/17	SJK (C) Chong Hwa, Setapak
Rumah Pangsa Sri Perak	118/00/18	SK Bandar Baru Sentul; SK Seri Perak
Bandar Baru Sentul	115/00/19	SMK Bandar Baru Sentul; Majlis Kebajikan dan Pembangunan Masyarakat Kebangsaan Malaysia (MAKPEM)
Sentul Tengah	115/00/20	SK Convent Sentul 1; SK Convent Sentul 2
Kampung Kovil Utara	115/00/21	SMK (L) Methodist Sentul
Kampung Kovil Selatan	115/00/22	SK La Salle (1) Sentul
Sentul Selatan	115/00/23	SK (L) Methodist Sentul

=== Representation history ===
Members of Parliament for Batu
Parliament	No	Years	Member	Party	Vote Share
Constituency created from Kepong and Setapak
7th	P097	1986–1990	Alexander Lee Yu Lung (李裕隆)	BN (GERAKAN)	22,262; 52.19%
8th	P097	1990–1995	Alexander Lee Yu Lung (李裕隆)	BN (GERAKAN)	36,646; 58.22%
9th	P104	1995–1999	Chong Chek Ah (庄智雅)	BN (GERAKAN)	26,823; 69.12%
10th	P104	1999–2004	Ng Lip Yong (吴立洋)	BN (GERAKAN)	22,639; 52.67%
11th	P115	2004–2008	Ng Lip Yong (吴立洋)	BN (GERAKAN)	28,718; 62.54%
12th	P115	2008–2013	Chua Tian Chang (蔡添强)	PR (PKR)	29,785; 59.43%
13th	P115	2013–2015	Chua Tian Chang (蔡添强)	PR (PKR)	41,672; 58.38%
13th	P115	2015–2018	Chua Tian Chang (蔡添强)	PH (PKR)	41,672; 58.38%
14th	P115	2018	Prabakaran Parameswaran (பிரபாகரன் பரமேஸ்வரன்)	Independent	38,125; 60.70%
14th	P115	2018–2022	Prabakaran Parameswaran (பிரபாகரன் பரமேஸ்வரன்)	PH (PKR)	38,125; 60.70%
15th	P115	2022–present	Prabakaran Parameswaran (பிரபாகரன் பரமேஸ்வரன்)	PH (PKR)	45,716; 52.46%

=== Historical boundaries ===
Federal constituency	Area			
Federal constituency	1984	1994	2003	2018
Batu	Batu; Sentul; Kampung Padang Balang; Taman Dato Senu; Taman Wahyu	Batu; Sentul; Kampung Padang Balang; Taman Batu View; Taman Wahyu		Batu; Sentul; Taman Dato Senu; Taman Intan Baiduri; Taman Wahyu

=== Local governments & postcodes ===
No.	Local Government	Postcode
P115	Kuala Lumpur City Hall	68100 Batu Caves; 50400, 51000, 51100, 52000, 53000 Kuala Lumpur

== Election results ==
Malaysian general election, 2022
Party	Candidate	Votes	%	∆%
PH	Prabakaran Parameswaran	45,716	52.46	▲52.46
PN	Azhar Yahya	23,475	26.94	▲26.94
BN	Kohilan Pillay Appu	10,398	11.93	▼9.86
Independent	Chua Tian Chang	4,603	5.28	▲5.28
PEJUANG	Wan Azliana Wan Adnan	849	0.97	▲0.97
Independent	Siti Zabedah Kasim	653	0.75	▲0.75
Independent	Nur Fathiah Syazwana @ Cleo Shaharuddin	628	0.72	▲0.72
Heritage	Naganathan Pillai	575	0.66	▲0.66
Parti Rakyat Malaysia	Zulkifli Abdul Fadlan	137	0.16	▲0.16
Independent	Too Cheng Huat @ Too Gao Lan	112	0.13	▲0.13
Total valid votes		87,146	100.00	
Total rejected ballots		477		
Unreturned ballots		218		
Turnout		87,841	76.54	▼6.78
Registered electors		113,863		
Majority		22,241	25.52	▼13.39
PH gain from Independent		Swing		?
Source(s) https://lom.agc.gov.my/ilims/upload/portal/akta/outputp/1753271/PUB%20613%20(2022)%20-%20PARLIMEN%20WP%20KUALA%20LUMPUR.pdf

Malaysian general election, 2018
Party	Candidate	Votes	%	∆%
Independent	Prabakaran Parameswaran	38,125	60.70	▲60.70
BN	Dominic Lau Hoe Chai	13,687	21.79	▼17.98
PAS	Azhar Yahya	10,610	16.89	▲16.89
Independent	Panjamorthy Muthusami	383	0.61	▲0.61
Total valid votes		62,805	100.00	
Total rejected ballots		498		
Unreturned ballots		297		
Turnout		63,000	83.32	▼1.16
Registered electors		76,328		
Majority		24,438	38.91	▲20.30
Independent gain from PKR		Swing		?
Source(s) "His Majesty's Government Gazette - Notice of Contested Election, Parliament for the Federal Territory of Kuala Lumpur [P.U. (B) 240/2018]" (PDF). Attorney General's Chambers of Malaysia. 3 May 2018. "Federal Government Gazette - Results of Contested Election and Statements of the Poll after the Official Addition of Votes, Parliamentary Constituencies for the Federal Territory of Kuala Lumpur [P.U. (B) 314/2018]" (PDF). Attorney General's Chambers of Malaysia. 28 May 2018. "Damansara parliamentary seat records biggest majority - Nation". The Star Online. 10 May 2018.

Malaysian general election, 2013
Party	Candidate	Votes	%	∆%
PKR	Chua Tian Chang	41,672	58.38	▼1.05
BN	Dominic Lau Hoe Chai	28,388	39.77	▼0.80
Pan-Malaysian Islamic Front	Hashim Karim	949	1.33	▲1.33
Independent	Nazariah Abbas	209	0.29	▲0.29
Independent	Atan Jasin	164	0.23	▲0.23
Total valid votes		71,382	100.00	
Total rejected ballots		606		
Unreturned ballots		159		
Turnout		72,147	84.48	▲11.76
Registered electors		85,402		
Majority		13,284	18.61	▼0.26
PKR hold		Swing		
Source(s) "Federal Government Gazette - Notice of Contested Election, Parliament for the Federal Territory of Kuala Lumpur [P.U. (B) 177/2013]" (PDF). Attorney General's Chambers of Malaysia. 26 April 2013. Archived from the original (PDF) on 2018-10-02. "Federal Government Gazette - Results of Contested Election and Statements of the Poll after the Official Addition of Votes, Parliamentary Constituencies for the Federal Territory of Kuala Lumpur [P.U. (B) 218/2013]" (PDF). Attorney General's Chambers of Malaysia. 22 May 2013. Archived from the original (PDF) on 2 October 2018.

Malaysian general election, 2008
Party	Candidate	Votes	%	∆%
PKR	Chua Tian Chang	29,785	59.43	▲21.97
BN	Lim Si Pin	20,330	40.57	▼21.97
Total valid votes		50,115	100.00	
Total rejected ballots		614		
Unreturned ballots		574		
Turnout		51,303	72.72	▲4.39
Registered electors		70,544		
Majority		9,455	18.87	▼6.21
PKR gain from BN		Swing		?

Malaysian general election, 2004
Party	Candidate	Votes	%	∆%
BN	Ng Lip Yong @ Ng Lip Sat	28,718	62.54	▲9.87
PKR	Chua Tian Chang	17,201	37.46	▲37.46
Total valid votes		45,919	100.00	
Total rejected ballots		309		
Unreturned ballots		0		
Turnout		46,228	68.33	▼5.20
Registered electors		67,652		
Majority		11,517	25.08	▲19.74
BN hold		Swing		

Malaysian general election, 1999
Party	Candidate	Votes	%	∆%
BN	Ng Lip Yong @ Ng Lip Sat	22,639	52.67	▼16.45
Parti Rakyat Malaysia	Sanusi Osman	20,342	47.33	▲16.45
Total valid votes		42,981	100.00	
Total rejected ballots		565		
Unreturned ballots		1,370		
Turnout		44,916	73.53	▲5.04
Registered electors		61,078		
Majority		2,297	5.34	▼32.91
BN hold		Swing		

Malaysian general election, 1995
Party	Candidate	Votes	%	∆%
BN	Chong Chek Ah	26,823	69.12	▲10.90
Parti Rakyat Malaysia	Sanusi Osman	11,981	30.88	▼9.25
Total valid votes		38,804	100.00	
Total rejected ballots		284		
Unreturned ballots		842		
Turnout		39,930	68.49	▼1.50
Registered electors		58,299		
Majority		14,842	38.25	▲20.16
BN hold		Swing		

Malaysian general election, 1990
Party	Candidate	Votes	%	∆%
BN	Alexander Lee Yu Lung	36,646	58.22	▲6.03
Parti Rakyat Malaysia	Syed Husin Ali	25,259	40.13	▲40.13
Independent	Azizi Shariff	1,043	1.66	▲1.66
Total valid votes		62,948	100.00	
Total rejected ballots		215		
Unreturned ballots		0		
Turnout		63,163	69.99	▲7.44
Registered electors		90,251		
Majority		11,387	18.09	▲3.40
BN hold		Swing		

Malaysian general election, 1986
Party	Candidate	Votes	%
BN	Alexander Lee Yu Lung	22,262	52.19
DAP	Chan Beng Shin	15,997	37.50
PAS	Hassan Shukri	3,923	9.20
SDP	Omar Din Mawai Din	477	1.12
Total valid votes		42,659	100.00
Total rejected ballots		415	
Unreturned ballots		0	
Turnout		43,074	62.55
Registered electors		68,865	
Majority		6,265	14.69
This was a new constituency created.
