= Batang Lupar =

Federal constituency of Sarawak, Malaysia

Batang Lupar (P201)
Sarawak constituency

Federal constituency
- Legislature: Dewan Rakyat
- MP: Mohamad Shafizan Kepli; GPS
- Constituency created: 1968
- First contested: 1969
- Last contested: 2022

Demographics
- Population (2020): 38,339
- Electors (2022): 43,072
- Area (km²): 1,990
- Pop. density (per km²): 19.3

Batang Lupar is a federal constituency in Samarahan Division (Simunjan District and Sebuyau District), Betong Division (Pusa District and Kabong District) and Sri Aman Division (Sri Aman District and Lingga District), Sarawak, Malaysia, that has been represented in the Dewan Rakyat since 1971.

The federal constituency was created in the 1968 redistribution and is mandated to return a single member to the Dewan Rakyat under the first past the post voting system.

== Demographics ==
Ethnic breakdown of Batang Lupar's electorate as of 2022
1. Malay-Muslim Bumiputera (71.0%)
2. Sarawak Bumiputera (26.3%)
3. Chinese (2.50%)
4. Other ethnicities (0.20%)

As of 2020, Batang Lupar has a population of 38,339 people.

Age breakdown of Batang Lupar's electorate as of 2022
1. 18-20 (6.38%)
2. 21-29 (20.5%)
3. 30-39 (21.8%)
4. 40-49 (16.5%)
5. 50-59 (16.6%)
6. 60-69 (10.8%)
7. 70-79 (5.40%)
8. 80-89 (1.56%)
9. above 90 (0.50%)
Gender breakdown of Batang Lupar's electorate as of 2022
1. Male (50.0%)
2. Female (50.0%)

== History ==
=== Polling districts ===
According to the gazette issued on 31 October 2022, the Batang Lupar constituency has a total of 15 polling districts.

State constituency	Polling Districts	Code	Location
Sebuyau（N27）	Seruyu	201/27/01	SK Seruyuk
Sebuyau（N27）	Sebangan	201/21/02	SK Sg. Ladong; Balai Raya Sg. Segali; SK Hj. Bujang Sebangan; Dewan Masyarakat Sebangan Sampat
Sebuyau（N27）	Sebuyau	201/27/03	SK Bajong; SK Tebelu; Astaka SK Kelait; SK Tuanku Bagus Sebuyau; SMK Sebuyau; SJK (C) Chung Hua Sebuyau
Sebuyau（N27）	Entangor	201/27/04	SK St. Andrew Entanggor
Sebuyau（N27）	Senayang	201/27/05	SK Lunying; Dewam SK Bulan Jeragam; RH Belayong Sg Nyamok; SK Mawang Taup; Dewan Serbaguna Sg. Rama; SK Raba
Sebuyau（N27）	Tungkah	201/27/06	SK Sg. Arus; SK Tungkah (Malay); SK Tungkah (Dayak); SK Rajau Ensika; SK Skitong / Meranti; Dewan Kpg Stika
Lingga (N28)	Lingga	201/28/01	SK St. Dunstan Seduku; SK Lela Pahlawan Lingga
Lingga (N28)	Meludam	201/28/02	Dewan Kpg. Sg. Mulon Meludam; Dewan Wanita Kpg. Triso; SJK (C) Chung Hua Meludam; SK Maludam
Lingga (N28)	Seduku	201/28/03	Bangunan Tadika KEMAS Seduku Baru; RH Augusine Nanta; RH Radin Putat
Lingga (N28)	Stumbin	201/28/04	Klinik Desa Tanjung Bijat; SMK Lingga; SK Gran / Stumbin
Lingga (N28)	Ladong	201/28/05	Tamu Simanggang; RH Charli Pruan A
Lingga (N28)	Lamanak	201/28/06	Mini Stadium Bandar Sri Aman; Dewan Sri Lamanak
Beting Maro (N29)	Beladin	201/29/01	SK Batang Maro; SK Sepinang; SMK Beladin; SK Semarang
Beting Maro (N29)	Undai	201/29/02	SK Tambak; RH Duat Anak Aji Blok Debak; SK Mutun; SJK (C) Chung Hua Pusa
Beting Maro (N29)	Pusa	201/29/03	SK Pusa

=== Representation history ===
Members of Parliament for Batang Lupar
Parliament	No	Years	Member	Party	Vote Share
Constituency created
		1969-1971	Parliament was suspended		
3rd	P128	1971-1974	Edwin Tangkun	SNAP	4,751; 36.72%
4th	P138	1974–1978	Edwin Tangkun	SNAP	6,926; 52.20%
5th	P138	1978-1982	Edwin Tangkun	BN (SNAP)	7,365; 62.92%
6th	P138	1982-1986	Edwin Tangkun	Independent	6,573; 48.90%
7th	P161	1986-1990	Daniel Tajem Miri	BN (PBDS)	7,975; 52.31%
8th	P162	1990-1995	Wan Junaidi Tuanku Jaafar (وان جنيدي توانكو جعفر)	BN (PBB)	5,795; 54.43%
9th	P174	1995–1999	Wan Junaidi Tuanku Jaafar (وان جنيدي توانكو جعفر)	BN (PBB)	Uncontested
10th	P175	1999–2004	Wan Junaidi Tuanku Jaafar (وان جنيدي توانكو جعفر)	BN (PBB)	7,903; 74.61%
11th	P201	2004-2008	Rohani Abdul Karim (روحاني عبدالكريم)	BN (PBB)	Uncontested
12th	P201	2008–2013	Rohani Abdul Karim (روحاني عبدالكريم)	BN (PBB)	11,015; 77.64%
13th	P201	2013–2018	Rohani Abdul Karim (روحاني عبدالكريم)	BN (PBB)	15,625; 77.02%
14th	P201	2018	Rohani Abdul Karim (روحاني عبدالكريم)	BN (PBB)	14,204; 70.49%
14th	P201	2018–2022	Rohani Abdul Karim (روحاني عبدالكريم)	GPS (PBB)	14,204; 70.49%
15th	P201	2022–present	Mohamad Shafizan Kepli (محمد شفيزان كڤلي)	GPS (PBB)	19,627; 71.22%

=== State constituency ===
Parliamentary constituency	State constituency					
Parliamentary constituency	1969–1978	1978–1990	1990–1999	1999–2008	2008–2016	2016−present
Batang Lupar			Beladin			
Batang Lupar				Beting Maro		
Batang Lupar		Lingga			Lingga	
Batang Lupar	Lingga-Sebuyau					
Batang Lupar			Sebuyau			
Batang Lupar	Simanggang					
Batang Lupar		Sri Aman				

=== Historical boundaries ===
State Constituency	Area					
State Constituency	1968	1977	1987	1996	2005	2015
Beladin			Balok; Beladin; Kampung Semarang; Maludam; Pusa			
Beting Maro				Beladin; Kampung Mangut; Kampung Semarang; Kampung Supa; Pusa	Beladin; Belok; Kampung Dato Godam; Kampung Semarang; Pusa	
Lingga		Emplanjau; Lingga; Maludam; Pantu; Sebuyau			Lingga; Maludam; Pruan; Seduku; Stumbin	
Lingga-Sebuyau	Emplanjau; Lingga; Maludam; Pantu; Sebuyau					
Sebuyau			Kampung Arus Melayu; Kampung Sungai Ladong; Lingga; Sebuyau; Seduku	Kampung Arus Melayu; Kampung Sungai Ladong; Lingga; Maludam; Sebuyau	Kampung Sungai Ladong; Kampung Selangking; Kampung Tebelu; Sebangan; Sebuyau	Kampung Arus Melayu; Kampung Sungai Ladong; Kampung Tebelu; Sebangan; Sebuyau
Simanggang	Batu Lintang; Lup; Pruan; Seduku; Sri Aman					
Sri Aman		Batu Lintang; Lup; Pruan; Seduku; Simanggang				

=== Current state assembly members ===
No.	State Constituency	Member	Coalition (Party)
N27	Sebuyau	Julaihi Narawi	GPS (PBB)
N28	Lingga	Dayang Noorazah Awang Sohor	GPS (PBB)
N29	Beting Maro	Razaili Gapor	GPS (PBB)

=== Local governments & postcodes ===
No.	State Constituency	Local Government	Postcode
N27	Sebuyau	Simunjan District Council	94850 Sebuyau; 94900 Lingga; 94950 Pusa; 95000 Sri Aman; 95400 Saratok
N28	Lingga	Betong District Council (Maludam area); Sri Aman District Council	94850 Sebuyau; 94900 Lingga; 94950 Pusa; 95000 Sri Aman; 95400 Saratok
N29	Beting Maro	Betong District Council (Undai area); Saratok District Council	94850 Sebuyau; 94900 Lingga; 94950 Pusa; 95000 Sri Aman; 95400 Saratok

== Election results ==
Malaysian general election, 2022
Party	Candidate	Votes	%	∆%
GPS	Mohamad Shafizan Kepli	19,627	71.22	▲71.22
PN	Hamdan Sani	5,164	18.74	▲18.74
PH	Well @ Maxwel Rojis	2,768	10.04	▲10.04
Total valid votes		27,559	100.00	
Total rejected ballots		458		
Unreturned ballots		101		
Turnout		28,118	65.28	▼3.83
Registered electors		43,072		
Majority		14,463	52.48	▲1.48
GPS gain from BN		Swing		?
Source(s) https://lom.agc.gov.my/ilims/upload/portal/akta/outputp/1753265/PARLIMEN%20SARAWAK%20(PUB%20620).pdf

Malaysian general election, 2018
Party	Candidate	Votes	%	∆%
BN	Rohani Abdul Karim	14,204	70.49	▼6.53
PAS	Wan Abdillah Wan Ahmad	3,927	19.49	▲19.49
PKR	Narudin Mentali	2,020	10.02	▼12.96
Total valid votes		20,151	100.00	
Total rejected ballots		403		
Unreturned ballots		49		
Turnout		20,603	69.11	▼6.75
Registered electors		29,811		
Majority		10,277	51.00	▼3.04
BN hold		Swing		
Source(s) "His Majesty's Government Gazette - Notice of Contested Election, Parliament for the State of Sarawak [P.U. (B) 247/2018]" (PDF). Attorney General's Chambers of Malaysia. 3 May 2018. "Federal Government Gazette - Results of Contested Election and Statements of the Poll after the Official Addition of Votes, Parliamentary Constituencies for the State of Sarawak [P.U. (B) 321/2018]" (PDF). Attorney General's Chambers of Malaysia. 28 May 2018. Archived from the original (PDF) on 29 December 2019.

Malaysian general election, 2013
Party	Candidate	Votes	%	∆%
BN	Rohani Abdul Karim	15,625	77.02	▼0.62
PKR	Abg. Zulkifli Abg. Engkeh	4,661	22.98	▲22.98
Total valid votes		20,286	100.00	
Total rejected ballots		425		
Unreturned ballots		43		
Turnout		20,754	75.86	▲11.65
Registered electors		27,360		
Majority		10,964	54.04	▼3.00
BN hold		Swing		
Source(s) "Federal Government Gazette - Notice of Contested Election, Parliament for the State of Sarawak [P.U. (B) 184/2013]" (PDF). Attorney General's Chambers of Malaysia. 26 April 2013. Archived from the original (PDF) on 30 September 2018. "Federal Government Gazette - Results of Contested Election and Statements of the Poll after the Official Addition of Votes, Parliamentary Constituencies for the State of Sarawak [P.U. (B) 225/2013]" (PDF). Attorney General's Chambers of Malaysia. 22 May 2013. Archived from the original (PDF) on 30 September 2018.

Malaysian general election, 2008
Party	Candidate	Votes	%	∆%
BN	Rohani Abdul Karim	11,015	77.64	▲77.64
PAS	Abang Eddy Allyanni Abang Fauzi	2,923	20.60	▲20.60
Independent	Ali Semsu	250	1.76	▲1.76
Total valid votes		14,188	100.00	
Total rejected ballots		193		
Unreturned ballots		12		
Turnout		14,393	64.21	
Registered electors		22,417		
Majority		8,092	57.04	
BN hold		Swing		

Malaysian general election, 2004: Batang Lupar
Party	Candidate	Votes	%	∆%
On the nomination day, Rohani Abdul Karim won uncontested.
BN	Rohani Abdul Karim			
Total valid votes			100.00	
Total rejected ballots				
Unreturned ballots				
Turnout				
Registered electors		19,027		
Majority				
BN hold		Swing		

Total Elector count is sourced from Tindak Malaysia's GitHub

Malaysian general election, 1999: Batang Lupar
Party	Candidate	Votes	%	∆%
BN	Wan Junaidi Tuanku Jaafar	7,903	74.61	▲74.61
STAR	Syid Assimie Wan Ismail	2,689	25.39	▲25.39
Total valid votes		10,592	100.00	
Total rejected ballots		339		
Unreturned ballots		13		
Turnout		10,944	57.85	
Registered electors		18,917		
Majority		5,214	49.22	
BN hold		Swing		

Malaysian general election, 1995: Batang Lupar
Party	Candidate	Votes	%	∆%
On the nomination day, Wan Junaidi Tuanku Jaafar won uncontested.
BN	Wan Junaidi Tuanku Jaafar			
Total valid votes			100.00	
Total rejected ballots				
Unreturned ballots				
Turnout				
Registered electors		19,562		
Majority				
BN hold		Swing		

1995 Elector Count is sourced from Tindak Malaysia's GitHub

Malaysian general election, 1990: Batang Lupar
Party	Candidate	Votes	%	∆%
BN	Wan Junaidi Tuanku Jaafar	5,795	54.43	▲2.12
PERMAS	Wan Habib Syed Mahmud	3,130	29.40	▲29.40
Independent	Abang Ismail Abd. Hadari	1,722	16.17	▲16.17
Total valid votes		10,647	100.00	
Total rejected ballots		166		
Unreturned ballots		0		
Turnout		10,813	66.97	▲7.95
Registered electors		16,145		
Majority		2,665	25.03	▲14.97
BN hold		Swing		

Malaysian general election, 1986: Batang Lupar
Party	Candidate	Votes	%	∆%
BN	Daniel Tajem Miri	7,975	52.31	▲52.31
Independent	Donald Lawan	6,441	42.25	▲42.25
Independent	Baba Rumpang	830	5.44	▲5.44
Total valid votes		15,246	100.00	
Total rejected ballots		325		
Unreturned ballots		0		
Turnout		15,571	59.02	▼1.15
Registered electors		26,383		
Majority		1,534	10.06	▲5.38
BN gain from Independent		Swing		?

Malaysian general election, 1982: Batang Lupar
Party	Candidate	Votes	%	∆%
Independent	Edwin Tangkun	6,573	48.90	▲48.90
BN	Willington Rufus Nanang	5,944	44.22	▼18.70
Independent	Henry Bernard Senada	926	6.89	▲6.89
Total valid votes		13,443	100.00	
Total rejected ballots		472		
Unreturned ballots		0		
Turnout		13,915	60.17	
Registered electors		23,127		
Majority		629	4.68	▼21.16
Independent gain from BN		Swing		?

Malaysian general election, 1978: Batang Lupar
Party	Candidate	Votes	%	∆%
BN	Edwin Tangkun	7,365	62.92	▲62.92
Independent	Brodie Sureng	4,340	37.08	▲37.08
Total valid votes		11,705	100.00	
Total rejected ballots		1,163		
Unreturned ballots		0		
Turnout		12,868	61.06	▼14.14
Registered electors		21,076		
Majority		3,025	25.84	▲21.44
BN gain from SNAP		Swing		?

Malaysian general election, 1974: Batang Lupar
Party	Candidate	Votes	%	∆%
SNAP	Edwin Tangkun	6,926	52.20	▲15.48
BN	Paul Anding	6,341	47.80	▲47.80
Total valid votes		13,267	100.00	
Total rejected ballots		658		
Unreturned ballots		0		
Turnout		13,925	75.20	▼3.63
Registered electors		18,518		
Majority		585	4.40	▼7.23
SNAP hold		Swing		

Malaysian general election, 1969: Batang Lupar
Party	Candidate	Votes	%
SNAP	Edwin Tangkun	4,751	36.72
SUPP	Hollis Tini	3,247	25.09
PESAKA	Yaman Mohamad Tahir	3,142	24.28
PBB	Abang Hamid Salam	1,800	13.91
Total valid votes		12,940	100.00
Total rejected ballots		836	
Unreturned ballots		0	
Turnout		13,776	78.83
Registered electors		17,476	
Majority		1,504	11.63
This was a new constituency created.
