= Wan Ahmad Fayhsal =

Malaysian politician

Yang Berhormat Tuan Wan Ahmad Fayhsal Wan Ahmad Kamal JMK MP
- وان أحمد فيصل وان أحمد کمال
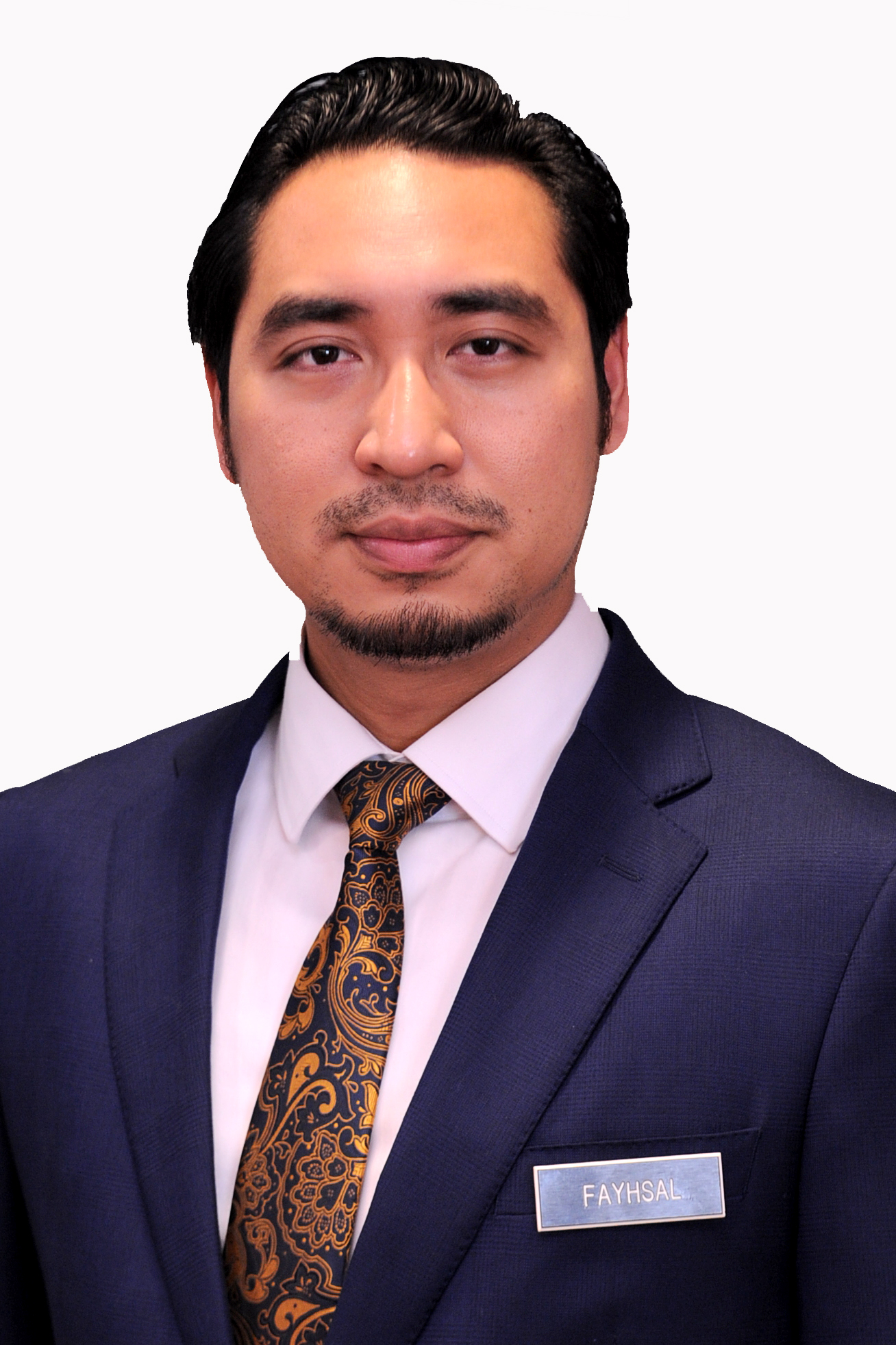
- Wan Ahmad Fayhsal in 2020

Deputy Minister of National Unity
- In office 30 August 2021 – 24 November 2022
- Monarch: Abdullah
- Prime Minister: Ismail Sabri Yaakob
- Minister: Halimah Mohamed Sadique
- Preceded by: Ti Lian Ker
- Succeeded by: Saraswathy Kandasami
- Constituency: Senator

Deputy Minister of Youth and Sports
- In office 10 March 2020 – 16 August 2021
- Monarch: Abdullah
- Prime Minister: Muhyiddin Yassin
- Minister: Reezal Merican Naina Merican
- Preceded by: Steven Sim Chee Keong
- Succeeded by: Ti Lian Ker
- Constituency: Senator

Member of the Malaysian Parliament for Machang
- Incumbent
- Assumed office 19 November 2022; Suspended：18 July 2024 – 17 January 2025
- Preceded by: Ahmad Jazlan Yaakub (BN–UMNO)
- Majority: 10,154 (2022)

Senator Appointed by the Yang di-Pertuan Agong
- In office 10 March 2020 – 5 November 2022
- Monarch: Abdullah
- Prime Minister: Muhyiddin Yassin (2020–2021); Ismail Sabri Yaakob (2021–2022)

2nd Youth Chief of the Malaysian United Indigenous Party
- In office 16 August 2020 – 29 October 2024
- President: Muhyiddin Yassin
- Deputy: Ahmad Faizal Azumu
- Preceded by: Syed Saddiq Syed Abdul Rahman
- Succeeded by: Muhammad Hilman Idham

Faction represented in Dewan Rakyat
- 2022–2026: Perikatan Nasional
- 2026: Independent

Faction represented in Dewan Negara
- 2020: Malaysian United Indigenous Party
- 2020–2022: Perikatan Nasional

Personal details
- Born: Wan Ahmad Fayhsal bin Wan Ahmad Kamal; 8 May 1987 (age 39) Kuala Lumpur, Malaysia
- Citizenship: Malaysia
- Party: Pan Malaysian Islamic Party (PAS) (2006-2015) (Note: He also the member of JIK during studies in UTP.); Malaysian United Indigenous Party (BERSATU) (2016–2026) (Note: Suspended membership from BERSATU since 14 October 2025.) (Note: Membership revoked since 13 February 2026.); National Vision Party (Malaysia) (WAWASAN) (since 2026)
- Other political affiliations: Pakatan Harapan (PH) (2017–2020); Perikatan Nasional (PN) (2020–present)
- Spouse: Siti Nuhara Riduan (m. 2012)
- Relations: Wan Kuzain Wan Ahmad Kamal (younger half-brother); Wan Kuzri Wan Ahmad Kamal (younger half-brother)
- Children: 2
- Education: Universiti Teknologi Petronas (BEng); King's College London (MA)
- Occupation: Politician
- Nickname(s): WAF, (Note: Abbreviation for Wan Ahmad Fayhsal.) Mat Jargon

Wan Ahmad Fayhsal bin Wan Ahmad Kamal (Jawi: وان أحمد فيصل بن وان أحمد کمال; born 8 May 1987), better known as WAF is a Malaysian politician who has served as the Member of Parliament (MP) for Machang since November 2022 and has served as a Senator from March 2020 to November 2022. He served as the Deputy Minister of National Unity from 2021 - 2022 Deputy Minister of Youth and Sports from 2020 to 2021. He was a Supreme Council Member of the Malaysian United Indigenous Party (BERSATU), a component party of the PN coalition and also served as the Youth Chief of BERSATU until he was suspended as member of the party in 2024 and he was also removed as the party youth chief. On 13 February 2026 Fayhsal and other 18 member was expelled from the party.

== Early life and education ==
Wan Ahmad Fayhsal bin Wan Ahmad Kamal was born on 8 May 1987 in Kuala Lumpur, Malaysia. His younger half-brothers, Wan Kuzain Wan Ahmad Kamal and Wan Kuzri Wan Ahmad Kamal are professional soccer players in the United States.

Wan Ahmad Fayhsal grew up and received his primary education in the neighbourhood of Taman Melawati, Kuala Lumpur before moving to Sekolah Menengah Sains Selangor, a science-focused boarding school in nearby Cheras, Selangor. He obtained his bachelor's degree in chemical engineering from Universiti Teknologi Petronas (UTP). He earned his Master of Arts in geopolitics (Territorial Security) from King's College London on 23 January 2019. His thesis was titled "The Encircling Dragon: Deciphering China's Geo-economic Expansionism in Peninsular Malaysia".

== Early career ==
Upon graduation, Wan Ahmad Fayhsal worked at Malaysia's national oil and gas company PETRONAS as a Business and Strategic Planning Executive under the Technology and Engineering (T&E) Division.

On 1 April 2010, he became Senior Executive of the Bumiputera Agenda Steering Unit (TERAJU), and was one of the individuals responsible for establishing the Bumiputera Education Steering Foundation (PENERAJU) under the Prime Minister's Department.

Wan Ahmad Fayhsal served as assistant lecturer at the Selangor International Islamic University College (KUIS) before he became a Research Fellow at the Putra Business School, Universiti Putra Malaysia. He was also active writing on various issues including business and geopolitics on various publications including New Straits Times, The Star, Global Research, Asia Times and The Edge.

== Political career (2020–present) ==
=== Senatorship and deputy ministership (2020–2022) ===
On his early political career, Wan Ahmad Fayhsal frequently gave political talks to university students and was a regular speaker on the MLStudios YouTube channel and formerly known as Rausyanfikir.

Wan Ahmad Fayhsal was Special Tasks Officer to then Minister of Youth and Sports, Syed Saddiq Syed Abdul Rahman from late 2018 until early 2020. Following the fall of the Pakatan Harapan (PH) government due to 'Sheraton Move', he was appointed Deputy Minister of Youth and Sports under the Cabinet of Muhyiddin Yassin. On the same day, he swore in as a Senator (member of Dewan Negara or Malaysian Senate) to qualify him for a cabinet post.

On 16 August 2020, Wan Ahmad Fayhsal succeeded Syed Saddiq Syed Abdul Rahman as the head of ARMADA, the youth wing of the Malaysian United Indigenous Party (BERSATU) in the party's first election. Syed Saddiq, a founding member of BERSATU and its inaugural, pro-tem youth chief, was earlier sacked from BERSATU amidst a political crisis. Wan Ahmad Fayhsal was subsequently appointed the Deputy Chief II of Perikatan Nasional's youth wing.

After Muhyiddin Yassin tendered his cabinet's resignation upon losing his parliamentary majority after at least 15 Members of Parliament from UMNO withdrew their support for the ruling coalition, he became the Deputy Minister of National Unity in the Ismail Sabri Administration.

On 14 October 2025, the Disciplinary Board of BERSATU announced his membership suspension for a term after receiving written complaints from party members and summoning him for a hearing session on 8 October 2025 about his breach of Party Constitution and Members' Code of Conduct.

=== Member of Parliament for Machang (2022–present) ===
In the 15th Malaysian general election, Wan Ahmad Fayhsal won the parliamentary seat in Machang. As MP for Machang, he called for the Prime Minister post to be limited for Malays only.

In July 2025, Wan Ahmad Fayhsal was suspended of his duties as a Member of Parliament and barred from attending Dewan Rakyat sessions for a period of six months after his allegations regarding a letter allegedly containing information regarding the real mastermind behind the takeover of Malaysia Airports Holdings Berhad (MAHB).

The decision was announced by Dewan Rakyat speaker Johari Abdul after the motion, which was proposed by Azalina Othman Said received majority support in a split vote, with 110 MPs in favour and 63 against, while three abstained and 46 were absent.

== Personal life ==
Wan Ahmad Fayhsal is married to Dr. Siti Nuhara binti Riduan on 5 September 2012 and have 2 children, namely Wan Ahmad Dastan Wan Ahmad Fayhsal and Wan Ahmad Razan Wan Ahmad Fayhsal.

== Election results ==
Parliament of Malaysia
Year	Constituency	Candidate	Votes	Pct	Opponent(s)	Votes	Pct	Ballots cast	Majority	Turnout
2022	P029 Machang	Wan Ahmad Fayhsal Wan Ahmad Kamal (BERSATU)	35,603	54.68%	Ahmad Jazlan Yaakub (UMNO)	25,449	39.08%	66,024	10,154	73.31%
2022	P029 Machang	Wan Ahmad Fayhsal Wan Ahmad Kamal (BERSATU)	35,603	54.68%	Rosli Allani Abdul Kadir (PKR)	3,934	6.04%	66,024	10,154	73.31%
2022	P029 Machang	Wan Ahmad Fayhsal Wan Ahmad Kamal (BERSATU)	35,603	54.68%	Mohammad Seman (PUTRA)	128	0.20%	66,024	10,154	73.31%

== Honours ==
=== Honours of Malaysia ===
- Malaysia
  - Recipient of the 17th Yang di-Pertuan Agong Installation Medal (2024)
- Kelantan
  - Companion of the Order of the Life of the Crown of Kelantan (JMK) (2025)

== See also ==
- Members of the Dewan Negara, 14th Malaysian Parliament
- List of people who have served in both Houses of the Malaysian Parliament
