= Mohd Redzuan Md Yusof =

Malaysian politician

Yang Berbahagia Datuk Seri Mohd Redzuan Md Yusof DGSM
- محمد رضوان مد يوسف
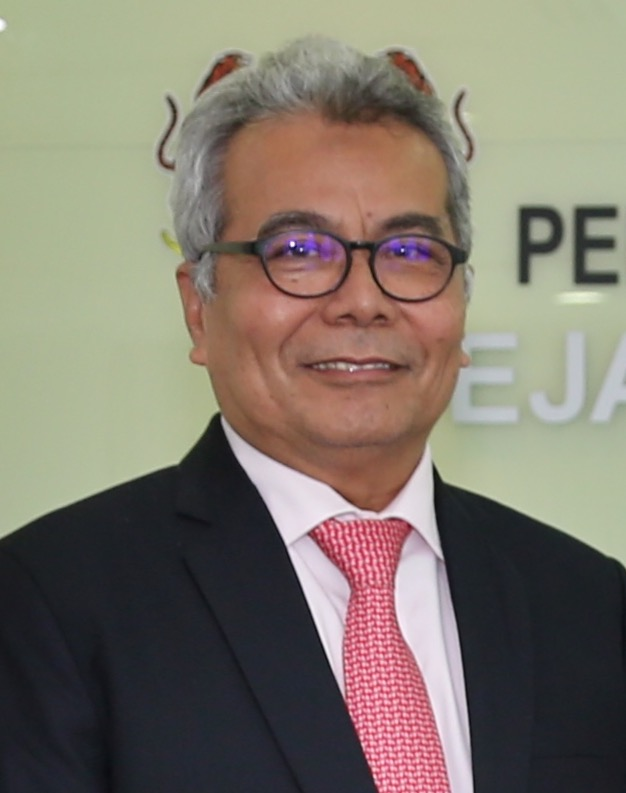

Minister in the Prime Minister's Department Special Functions
- In office 10 March 2020 – 16 August 2021
- Monarch: Abdullah
- Prime Minister: Muhyiddin Yassin
- Deputy: Mastura Mohd Yazid
- Preceded by: Position established
- Succeeded by: Abdul Latiff Ahmad
- Constituency: Alor Gajah

Minister of Entrepreneur Development
- In office 2 July 2018 – 24 February 2020
- Monarchs: Muhammad V (2018–2019); Abdullah (2019–2020)
- Prime Minister: Mahathir Mohamad
- Deputy: Mohd Hatta Ramli
- Preceded by: Hamzah Zainudin (Minister of Domestic Trade, Co-operatives and Consumerism)
- Succeeded by: Wan Junaidi Tuanku Jaafar
- Constituency: Alor Gajah

Member of the Malaysian Parliament for Alor Gajah
- In office 9 May 2018 – 19 November 2022
- Preceded by: Koh Nai Kwong (BN–MCA)
- Succeeded by: Adly Zahari (PH–AMANAH)
- Majority: 6,980 (2018)

Other roles
- 2021–: Chairman of TERAJU

Personal details
- Born: Mohd Redzuan bin Md Yusof; 14 April 1957 (age 68) Masjid Tanah, Malacca, Federation of Malaya (now Malaysia)
- Citizenship: Malaysian
- Party: Malaysian United Indigenous Party (BERSATU) (since 2017)
- Other political affiliations: Pakatan Harapan (PH) (2017–2020); Perikatan Nasional (PN) (since 2020)
- Spouse(s): Hamidah Osman (m. 1981) Nurshid'la Ahmad Kamaruddin (m. 2011)
- Education: Sekolah Tuanku Abdul Rahman
- Alma mater: University of Leeds (BEng)
- Occupation: Politician
- Profession: Businessman
- Mohd Redzuan Md Yusof on Facebook; Mohd Redzuan Md Yusof on Parliament of Malaysia

Mohd Redzuan bin Md Yusof (Jawi: محمد رضوان بن مد يوسف; born 14 April 1957) is a Malaysian politician who served as Minister in the Prime Minister's Department for Special Functions in the Perikatan Nasional (PN) administration under former Prime Minister Muhyiddin Yassin from March 2020 to August 2021, the Minister of Entrepreneur Development in the Pakatan Harapan (PH) administration under former prime minister Mahathir Mohamad from July 2018 to the collapse of the PH administration in February 2020 and the Member of Parliament (MP) for Alor Gajah from May 2018 to November 2022. He is a member of the Malaysian United Indigenous Party (BERSATU), a component party of the PN coalition and formerly PH coalition.

== Early life and education ==
Mohd Redzuan was born in Masjid Tanah, Malacca, Federation of Malaya (now Malaysia). He graduated with Bachelor of Civil Engineering from University of Leeds.

== Early career ==
Mohd Redzuan worked for an American company based in Malaysia for eight years. He joined Petronas in 1999 and worked there for three years. After that, he started his own business.

== Political career ==
Mohd Redzuan contested and succeeded in winning the Alor Gajah parliamentary seat as a BERSATU candidate in the 2018 general election. Following this, he was appointed the Minister of Entrepreneur Development in the seventh Mahathir Mohamed's cabinet on 2 July 2018 in the presence of the Yang di Pertuan Agong. After political crisis took place in 2020, he was reappointed Minister in the Prime Minister's Department for Special Functions in Muhyiddin cabinet.

== Personal life ==
Mohd Redzuan was married to Hamidah Osman in 1981 and Nurshid'la Ahmad Kamaruddin in 2011. He is blessed with 4 children.

== Election results ==
Parliament of Malaysia
Year	Constituency	Candidate	Votes	Pct	Opponent(s)	Votes	Pct	Ballots cast	Majority	Turnout
2018	P135 Alor Gajah	Mohd Redzuan Md Yusof (BERSATU)	29,330	50.73%	Wong Nai Chee (MCA)	22,350	38.66%	59,000	6,980	83.85%
2018	P135 Alor Gajah	Mohd Redzuan Md Yusof (BERSATU)	29,330	50.73%	Mohammad Nazree Mohammad Aris (PAS)	6,135	10.61%	59,000	6,980	83.85%
2022	P135 Alor Gajah	Mohd Redzuan Md Yusof (BERSATU)	17,211	23.58%	Adly Zahari (AMANAH)	28,178	38.60%	73,000	890	78.23%
2022	P135 Alor Gajah	Mohd Redzuan Md Yusof (BERSATU)	17,211	23.58%	Shahril Sufian Hamdan (UMNO)	27,288	37.38%	73,000	890	78.23%
2022	P135 Alor Gajah	Mohd Redzuan Md Yusof (BERSATU)	17,211	23.58%	Muhammad Nazriq Abdul Rahman (PEJUANG)	323	0.44%	73,000	890	78.23%

== Honours ==
=== Honours of Malaysia ===
- Malacca
  - Grand Commander of the Exalted Order of Malacca (DGSM) – Datuk Seri (2018)
