= Minister of Entrepreneur and Cooperatives Development (Malaysia) =

Malaysian government minister

- Kementerian Pembangunan Usahawan dan Koperasi

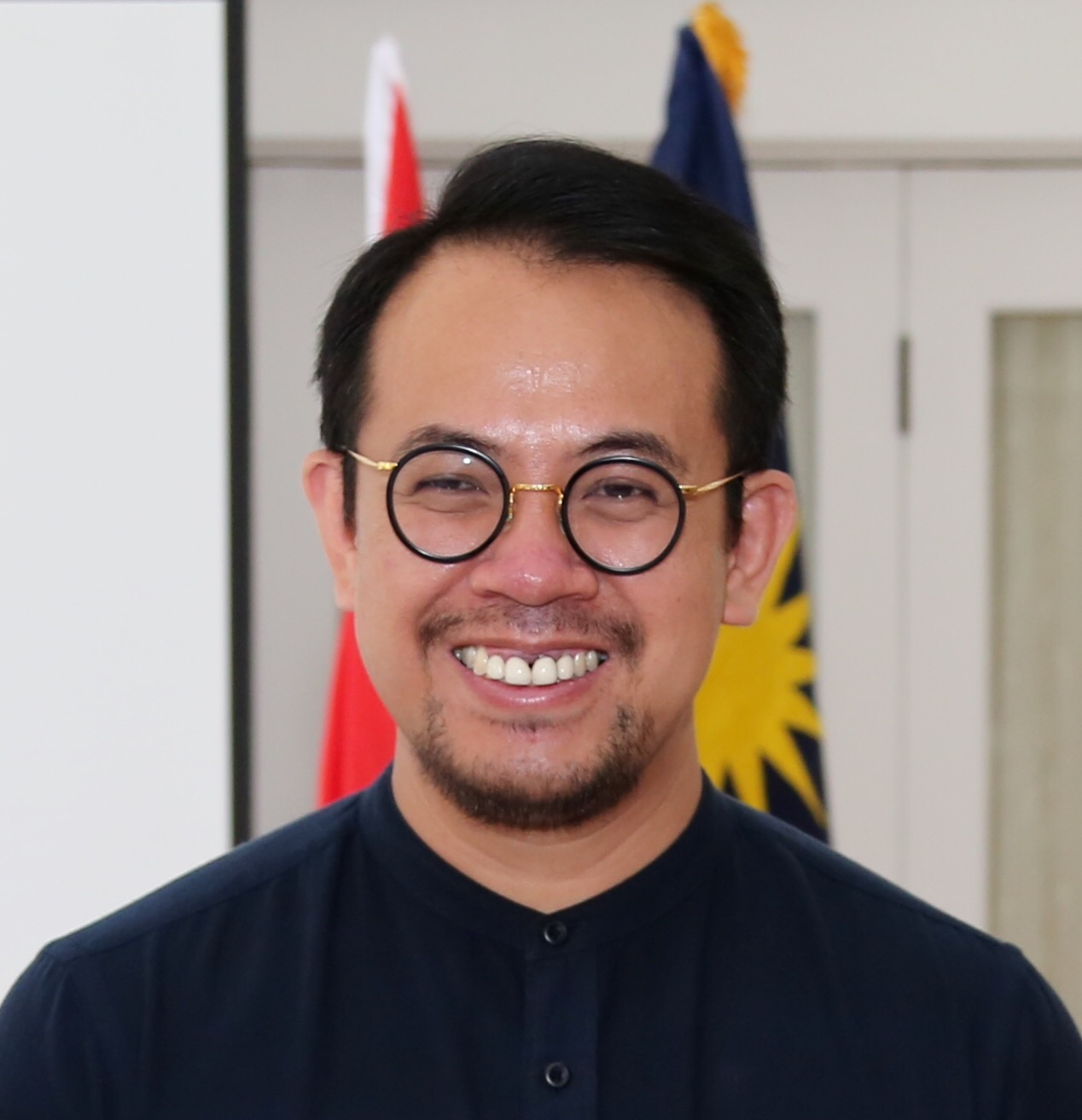
- Incumbent; Steven Sim Chee Keong since 17 December 2025
- Ministry of Entrepreneur and Cooperatives Development
- Style: Yang Berhormat Menteri (The Honourable Minister)
- Abbreviation: KUSKOP/MECD
- Member of: Cabinet of Malaysia
- Reports to: Parliament of Malaysia
- Appointer: Yang di-Pertuan Agong on the recommendation of the Prime Minister of Malaysia
- Formation: 1974
- First holder: Hussein Onn (Minister of Coordination of Public Corporations)
- Deputy: Mohamad Alamin
- Website: www.kuskop.gov.my

The latest Minister of Entrepreneur and Cooperatives Development (Malay: Kementerian Pembangunan Usahawan dan Koperasi; Jawi: كمنترين ڤمباڠونن اوسهاوان دان كوڤيراسي) is currently Steven Sim Chee Keong since 17 December 2025. He has been supported by the deputy minister, Mohamad Alamin since 17 December 2025. The minister administers the portfolio through the Ministry of Entrepreneur and Co-operatives Development.

== List of ministers ==
=== Entrepreneur development/coordination of public corporations ===
The following individuals have held office as Minister of Entrepreneur Development/Coordination of Public Corporations:

Political party: BN PH GPS

Portrait	Name (Birth–Death) Constituency	Political party	Title	Took office	Left office	Deputy Minister	Prime Minister (Cabinet)
	Hussein Onn (1922–1990); MP for Sri Gading	BN (UMNO)	Minister of Coordination of Public Corporations	1974	1976	Mohamed Rahmat	Abdul Razak Hussein (II)
	Mohamed Yaacob (1926–2009); MP for Tanah Merah	BN (UMNO)	Minister of Public Enterprises	1976	1977	Vacant	Hussein Onn (I)
	Mohamed Nasir (1916–1997); Senator	BN (BERJASA)	Minister of Public Enterprises	1977	1978	Mustapha Abdul Jabar	Hussein Onn (I)
	Abdul Manan Othman (d. 2017); MP for Kuala Trengganu	BN (UMNO)	Minister of Public Enterprises	1978	1980	Vacant	Hussein Onn (II)
	Rafidah Aziz (b. 1943); MP for Kuala Kangsar	BN (UMNO)	Minister of Public Enterprises	1980	20 May 1987	Vacant (1980–1986); Daud Taha (1986–1987)	Hussein Onn (II); Mahathir Mohamad (I · II · III)
	Napsiah Omar (1943–2018); MP for Kuala Pilah	BN (UMNO)	Minister of Public Enterprises	20 May 1987	26 October 1990	Daud Taha	Mahathir Mohamad (III)
	Mohamed Yusof Mohamed Noor (b. 1941); MP for Besut	BN (UMNO)	Minister of Public Enterprises	27 October 1990	3 May 1995	Siti Zaharah Sulaiman	Mahathir Mohamad (IV)
	Mustapa Mohamed (b. 1950); MP for Jeli	BN (UMNO)	Minister of Entrepreneur Development	4 May 1995	14 December 1999	Idris Jusoh	Mahathir Mohamad (V)
	Mohamed Nazri Abdul Aziz (b. 1954); MP for Chenderoh	BN (UMNO)	Minister of Entrepreneur Development	15 December 1999	26 March 2004	Vacant (1999–2002); Mohd Khalid Mohd Yunus (2002–2004)	Mahathir Mohamad (VI); Abdullah Ahmad Badawi (I)
	Mohamed Khaled Nordin (b. 1958); MP for Pasir Gudang	BN (UMNO)	Minister of Entrepreneur and Co-operatives Development	27 March 2004	18 March 2008	Khamsiyah Yeop	Abdullah Ahmad Badawi (II)
	Noh Omar (b. 1958); MP for Tanjong Karang	BN (UMNO)	Minister of Entrepreneur and Co-operatives Development	19 March 2008	9 April 2009	Saifuddin Abdullah	Abdullah Ahmad Badawi (III)
	Mohd Redzuan Md Yusof (b. 1957); MP for Alor Gajah	PH (BERSATU)	Minister of Entrepreneur Development and Co-operatives	2 July 2018	24 February 2020	Mohd Hatta Ramli	Mahathir Mohamad (VII)
	Dr. Wan Junaidi Tuanku Jaafar (b. 1946); MP for Santubong	GPS (PBB)	Minister of Entrepreneur Development and Co-operatives	10 March 2020	16 August 2021	Mas Ermieyati Samsudin	Muhyiddin Yassin (I)
	Noh Omar (b. 1958); MP for Tanjong Karang	BN (UMNO)	Minister of Entrepreneur Development and Co-operatives	11 September 2021	24 November 2022	Muslimin Yahaya	Ismail Sabri Yaakob (I)
	Ewon Benedick (b. 1983); MP for Penampang	PH (UPKO)	Minister of Entrepreneur Development and Co-operatives	3 December 2022	8 November 2025	Saraswathy Kandasami (2022–2023); Ramanan Ramakrishnan (2023–2025)	Anwar Ibrahim (I)
	Alexander Nanta Linggi (b. 1958); MP for Kapit; Acting	GPS (PBB)	Acting Minister of Entrepreneur Development and Co-operatives	3 December 2025	17 December 2025	Ramanan Ramakrishnan	Anwar Ibrahim (I)
	Steven Sim Chee Keong (b. 1982); MP for Bukit Mertajam	PH (DAP)	Minister of Entrepreneur Development and Co-operatives	17 December 2025	Incumbent	Mohamad Alamin	Anwar Ibrahim (I)

=== Co-operatives ===
The following individuals have held office as Minister of Co-operatives:

Political party: Alliance/BN PH GPS

Portrait	Name (Birth–Death) Constituency	Political party	Title	Took office	Left office	Deputy Minister	Prime Minister (Cabinet)
	Abdul Aziz Ishak (1914–1999); MP for Selangor Barat (1955–1959); MP for Kuala Langat (1959–1964)	Alliance (UMNO)	Minister of Agriculture and Co-operatives	1955	1962	Vacant	Chief Minister of the Federation of Malaya; Tunku Abdul Rahman (I · II)
	Khir Johari (1923–2006); MP for Kedah Tengah	Alliance (UMNO)	Minister of Agriculture and Co-operatives	1963	1965	Vacant	Tunku Abdul Rahman (II · III)
	Mohamed Ghazali Jawi (1924–1982); MP for Ulu Perak	Alliance (UMNO)	Minister of Agriculture and Co-operatives	1966	1969	Vacant	Tunku Abdul Rahman (III)
	Sakaran Dandai (b. 1930); MP for Semporna	BN (UMNO)	Minister of Lands and Co-operatives Development	27 October 1990	16 March 1994	Mohd. Khalid Mohd. Yunos	Mahathir Mohamad (IV)
	Osu Sukam (b. 1949); MP for Papar	BN (UMNO)	Minister of Lands and Co-operatives Development	21 August 1994	13 March 1999	Mohd. Khalid Mohd. Yunos (1994–1995); Goh Cheng Teik (1995–1999)	Mahathir Mohamad (IV · V)
	Kasitah Gaddam (b. 1947); Senator	BN (UMNO)	Minister of Lands and Co-operatives Development	14 March 1999	26 March 2004	Goh Cheng Teik (1995–1999); Tan Kee Kwong (1999–2004)	Mahathir Mohamad (V · VI); Abdullah Ahmad Badawi (I)
	Mohamed Khaled Nordin (b. 1958); MP for Pasir Gudang	BN (UMNO)	Minister of Entrepreneur and Co-operatives Development	27 March 2004	18 March 2008	Khamsiyah Yeop	Abdullah Ahmad Badawi (II)
	Noh Omar (b. 1958); MP for Tanjong Karang	BN (UMNO)	Minister of Entrepreneur and Co-operatives Development	19 March 2008	9 April 2009	Saifuddin Abdullah	Abdullah Ahmad Badawi (III)
	Ismail Sabri Yaakob (b. 1960); MP for Bera	BN (UMNO)	Minister of Domestic Trade, Co-operatives and Consumerism	10 April 2009	15 May 2013	Tan Lian Hoe (2009–2013); Rohani Abdul Karim (2010–2013)	Najib Razak (I)
	Hasan Malek (b. 1946); MP for Kuala Pilah	BN (UMNO)	Minister of Domestic Trade, Co-operatives and Consumerism	16 May 2013	29 July 2015	Ahmad Bashah Md. Hanipah	Najib Razak (II)
	Hamzah Zainudin (b. 1957); MP for Larut	BN (UMNO)	Minister of Domestic Trade, Co-operatives and Consumerism	29 July 2015	9 May 2018	Ahmad Bashah Md. Hanipah (2015–2016); Henry Sum Agong (2016–2018)	Najib Razak (II)
	Mohd Redzuan Md Yusof (b. 1957); MP for Alor Gajah	PH (BERSATU)	Minister of Entrepreneur Development and Co-operatives	2 July 2018	24 February 2020	Mohd Hatta Ramli	Mahathir Mohamad (VII)
	Dr. Wan Junaidi Tuanku Jaafar (b. 1946); MP for Santubong	GPS (PBB)	Minister of Entrepreneur Development and Co-operatives	10 March 2020	16 August 2021	Mas Ermieyati Samsudin	Muhyiddin Yassin (I)
	Noh Omar (b. 1958); MP for Tanjong Karang	BN (UMNO)	Minister of Entrepreneur Development and Co-operatives	11 September 2021	24 November 2022	Muslimin Yahaya	Ismail Sabri Yaakob (I)
	Ewon Benedick (b. 1983); MP for Penampang	PH (UPKO)	Minister of Entrepreneur Development and Co-operatives	3 December 2022	8 November 2025	Saraswathy Kandasami (2022–2023); Ramanan Ramakrishnan (2023–2025)	Anwar Ibrahim (I)
	Alexander Nanta Linggi (b. 1958); MP for Kapit; Acting	GPS (PBB)	Acting Minister of Entrepreneur Development and Co-operatives	3 December 2025	17 December 2025	Ramanan Ramakrishnan	Anwar Ibrahim (I)
	Steven Sim Chee Keong (b. 1982); MP for Bukit Mertajam	PH (DAP)	Minister of Entrepreneur Development and Co-operatives	17 December 2025	Incumbent	Mohamad Alamin	Anwar Ibrahim (I)
