= Mohamad Shafizan Kepli =

Malaysian politician

Yang Berhormat Tuan Mohamad Shafizan Kepli PBS MP
- محمد شفيزان كڤلي

Member of the Malaysian Parliament for Batang Lupar
- Incumbent
- Assumed office 19 November 2022
- Preceded by: Rohani Abdul Karim (BN–PBB)
- Majority: 14,463 (2022)

Personal details
- Born: Mohamad Shafizan bin Kepli
- Citizenship: Malaysian
- Party: Parti Pesaka Bumiputera Bersatu (PBB)
- Other political affiliations: Gabungan Parti Sarawak (GPS)
- Spouse: Nazrah Abdullah Chek
- Children: 4
- Parent: Saftuyah Sain (mother)
- Education: Universiti Sains Malaysia

Mohamad Shafizan bin Kepli is a Malaysian politician who has served as the Member of Parliament (MP) for Batang Lupar since November 2022. He is a member and the Deputy Branch Chief of Beting Maro of the Parti Pesaka Bumiputera Bersatu (PBB), a component party of the Gabungan Parti Sarawak (GPS) coalition.

== Election results ==
Parliament of Malaysia
Year	Constituency	Candidate	Votes	Pct	Opponent(s)	Votes	Pct	Ballots cast	Majority	Turnout
2022	P201 Batang Lupar	Mohamad Shafizan Kepli (PBB)	19,627	71.22%	Hamdan Sani (PAS)	5,164	18.74%	28,118	14,463	65.28%
2022	P201 Batang Lupar	Mohamad Shafizan Kepli (PBB)	19,627	71.22%	Well @ Maxwel Rojis (AMANAH)	2,768	10.04%	28,118	14,463	65.28%

== Honours ==
=== Honours of Malaysia ===
- Malaysia
  - Recipient of the 17th Yang di-Pertuan Agong Installation Medal (2024)
- Sarawak
  - Officer of the Most Exalted Order of the Star of Sarawak (PBS) (2024)
  - Silver Medal of the Sarawak Independence Diamond Jubilee Medal (2024)
