= Wan Junaidi Tuanku Jaafar =

Governor of Sarawak

Tuan Yang Terutama Tun Pehin Sri Wan Junaidi Tuanku Jaafar SMN SBS DGSM PSM PNBS PJN JSM JBS PBS PPN PPS PPA PJPN
- وان جنيدي توانكو جعفر
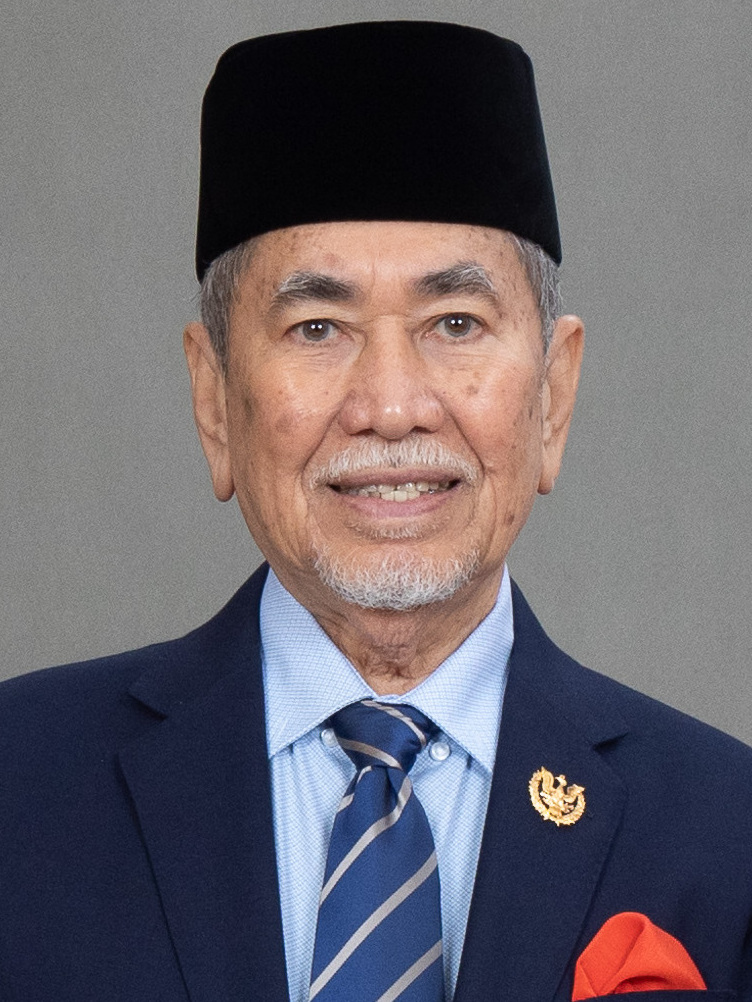
- Wan Junaidi in 2024

8th Yang di-Pertua Negeri of Sarawak
- Incumbent
- Assumed office 26 January 2024
- Premier: Abang Johari
- Preceded by: Abdul Taib Mahmud

19th President of the Dewan Negara
- In office 19 June 2023 – 19 January 2024
- Monarch: Abdullah
- Prime Minister: Anwar Ibrahim
- Deputy: Nur Jazlan Mohamed
- Preceded by: Rais Yatim
- Succeeded by: Mutang Tagal

Senator Appointed by the Yang di-Pertuan Agong
- In office 19 June 2023 – 19 January 2024
- Monarch: Abdullah
- Prime Minister: Anwar Ibrahim
Ministerial offices
Minister in the Prime Minister's Department (Parliament and Law)
In office 30 August 2021 – 24 November 2022
Monarch	Abdullah
Prime Minister	Ismail Sabri Yaakob
Deputy	Mas Ermieyati Samsudin
Preceded by	Takiyuddin Hassan
Succeeded by	Azalina Othman Said (Minister in the Prime Minister's Department (Law and Institutional Reforms))
Constituency	Santubong
Minister of Entrepreneur Development and Cooperatives
In office 10 March 2020 – 16 August 2021
Monarch	Abdullah
Prime Minister	Muhyiddin Yassin
Deputy	Mas Ermieyati Samsudin
Preceded by	Mohd Redzuan Md Yusof (Minister of Entrepreneur Development)
Succeeded by	Noh Omar
Constituency	Santubong
Minister of Natural Resources and Environment
In office 29 July 2015 – 10 May 2018
Monarchs	Abdul Halim (2015–2016); Muhammad V (2016–2018)
Prime Minister	Najib Razak
Deputy	Hamim Samuri
Preceded by	G. Palanivel
Succeeded by	Xavier Jayakumar Arulanandam (Natural Resources); Yeo Bee Yin (Environment)
Constituency	Santubong
Deputy Minister of Home Affairs
In office 16 May 2013 – 29 July 2015
Monarch	Abdul Halim
Prime Minister	Najib Razak
Minister	Ahmad Zahid Hamidi
Preceded by	Abu Seman Yusop; Lee Chee Leong
Succeeded by	Nur Jazlan Mohamed; Masir Kujat
Constituency	Santubong
Parliamentary offices
Deputy Speaker of Dewan Rakyat
In office 28 April 2008 – 3 April 2013 Serving with Ronald Kiandee
Monarchs	Mizan Zainal Abidin (2008–2011); Abdul Halim (2011–2013)
Prime Minister	Abdullah Ahmad Badawi (2008–2009); Najib Razak (2009–2013)
Speaker	Pandikar Amin Mulia
Preceded by	Lim Si Cheng
Succeeded by	Ronald Kiandee
Constituency	Santubong
Member of the Malaysian Parliament for Santubong
In office 21 March 2004 – 19 November 2022
Preceded by	Rohani Abdul Karim
Succeeded by	Nancy Shukri
Majority	10,560 (2004); 11,945 (2008); 20,936 (2013); 19,485 (2018)
Member of the Malaysian Parliament for Batang Lupar
In office 20 October 1990 – 21 March 2004
Preceded by	Daniel Tajem Miri
Succeeded by	Rohani Abdul Karim
Majority	2,665 (1990); Walkover (1995); 5,214 (1999)

Personal details
- Born: 1 February 1946 (age 80) Sadong Jaya, Simunjan, Crown Colony of Sarawak
- Party: PBB
- Other political affiliations: BN (1983–2018); GPS (since 2018)
- Spouses: Feona Sim @ Norjanah Abdullah (m. 1972; died 2022) Fauziah Mohd Sanusi (m. 2022)
- Children: 3
- Education: University of Buckingham (LLB); University of Southern California (DBA)
- Occupation: Politician; author
- Profession: Lawyer; police officer
- Website: wjunaidi.blogspot.com

Military service
- Allegiance: Malaysia
- Branch/service: Royal Malaysia Police
- Years of service: 1964–1982
- Rank: Superintendent
- Unit: Police Field Force
- Battles/wars: Indonesia-Malaysia confrontation; Communist insurgency in Sarawak; RASCOM Operations; Operation Hantam (Muara Tebas)

Wan Junaidi bin Tuanku Jaafar (Jawi: وان جنيدي بن توانكو جعفر; born 1 February 1946) is a Malaysian politician, author, lawyer and former police officer who has served as the eighth Yang di-Pertua Negeri of Sarawak since January 2024. A member of Parti Pesaka Bumiputera Bersatu, he previously served as the president and a member of senate in Dewan Negara from June 2023 until his resignation in January 2024.

Born in Simunjan District. Prior to his appointment as Yang di-Pertua Negeri of Sarawak, he had served in several portfolio; as a Minister in the Prime Minister's Department in charge of Parliament and Law in the Barisan Nasional (BN) administration under former Prime Minister Ismail Sabri Yaakob from August 2021 to the collapse of the BN administration in November 2022, Minister of Entrepreneur Development and Cooperative in the Perikatan Nasional (PN) administration under former Prime Minister Muhyiddin Yassin from March 2020 to the collapse of the PN administration in August 2021, Minister of Natural Resources and Environment and Deputy Minister of Home Affairs in the BN administration under former Prime Minister Najib Razak and former Minister Ahmad Zahid Hamidi from May 2013 to July 2015 as well as Deputy Speaker of the Dewan Rakyat from April 2008 to April 2013. He also served as the Member of Parliament (MP) for Santubong from March 2004 to November 2022 and for Batang Lupar from October 1990 to March 2004. He is also the third shortest-serving President of the Dewan Negara after Syed Sheh Barakbah and Mutang Tagal, serving in the position for only seven months before resigning to assume office as the Yang-di Pertua Negeri of Sarawak.

== Early life and education ==
Wan Junaidi was born on 1 February 1946 in Kampung Pendam, Sadong Jaya, Simunjan, Sarawak. He received his early education at Sekolah Rakyat Kampung Pendam from 1956 to 1958. Subsequently, he attended Abang Man Secondary School in Simunjan from 1959 to 1960, followed by Madrasah Melayu in Kuching from 1961 to 1963. He joined the Public Works Department at the age of 17, gaining skills in road construction under Australian engineer guidance. Wan Junaidi then decided to join the Royal Malaysia Police (RMP) in March 1964, following an open recruitment advertisement. He completed his police training in Kuala Lumpur in December of the same year.

== Early career ==
Wan Junaidi served in various branches of the Royal Malaysia Police from 1965 to 1968. He was transferred to the Para-Military Police Field Force (PFF) in 1968 and served in Miri and the Rajang Area Security Command (RASCOM) area until 1973. During his service, he battled communists in various jungle areas. He pursued his Form 5 and Form 6 education from 1974 to 1977 through correspondence. Wan Junaidi was promoted to the rank of assistant superintendent (ASP) in 1978. He ventured to England in December 1978 to undertake his law studies at the University of Buckingham, obtaining his Bachelor of Laws (LLB) with Second Class Honours in 1981. Wan Junaidi continued his legal education at the Council of Legal Education, London, graduating with a Degree of Utter-Barrister with Second Class Honours in 1982. He was admitted to the English Bar in May 1982 and became a Member of the Honourable Society of Lincoln's Inn in June 1982. Upon returning to Sarawak, he was called to the Sarawak Bar in August 1982 and appointed the chief prosecution officer of the Sarawak police. He briefly assumed the role of chief training officer at the Bukit Siol Police Training School in Kuching.

== Political career ==
Wan Junaidi began his political involvement in 1983 as a member of the Youth Committee of PBB for Satok Division. He continued his political activities and was appointed Head of Information for the branch in 1986. In the 1990 general election, Wan Junaidi won the Batang Lupar parliamentary seat and retained it in subsequent elections. He earned his doctorate in business administration from the University of Southern California in 2005. Wan Junaidi switched constituencies in the 2004 general election, contesting and winning the Santubong parliamentary seat. He retained the Santubong seat in subsequent general elections. On 28 April 2008, he was elected as one of the Deputy Speakers of the Dewan Rakyat for one term, serving alongside Ronald Kiandee.

== Ministerial career ==
=== Deputy Minister of Home Affairs (2013–2015) ===
On 16 May 2013, Wan Junaidi was appointed the Deputy Minister of Home Affairs under Prime Minister Najib Razak's cabinet. During his tenure there, he made remarks attributing a higher rate of statutory rape cases among Malays to Malay community's "culturally sensitivity" about their youth, which led to more cases being reported compared to "non-Malays" who may be more accepting of statutory rape. However, his statement was misinterpreted and distorted by Chong Chieng Jen, MP for Bandar Kuching. What Wan Junaidi actually said was that "Malays tend to be more sensitive in making reports, whereas non-Malays are less sensitive to report cases of statutory rape to the police." This observation was based on statistics from the National Registration Department.

=== Minister of Natural Resources and Environment (2015–2018) ===
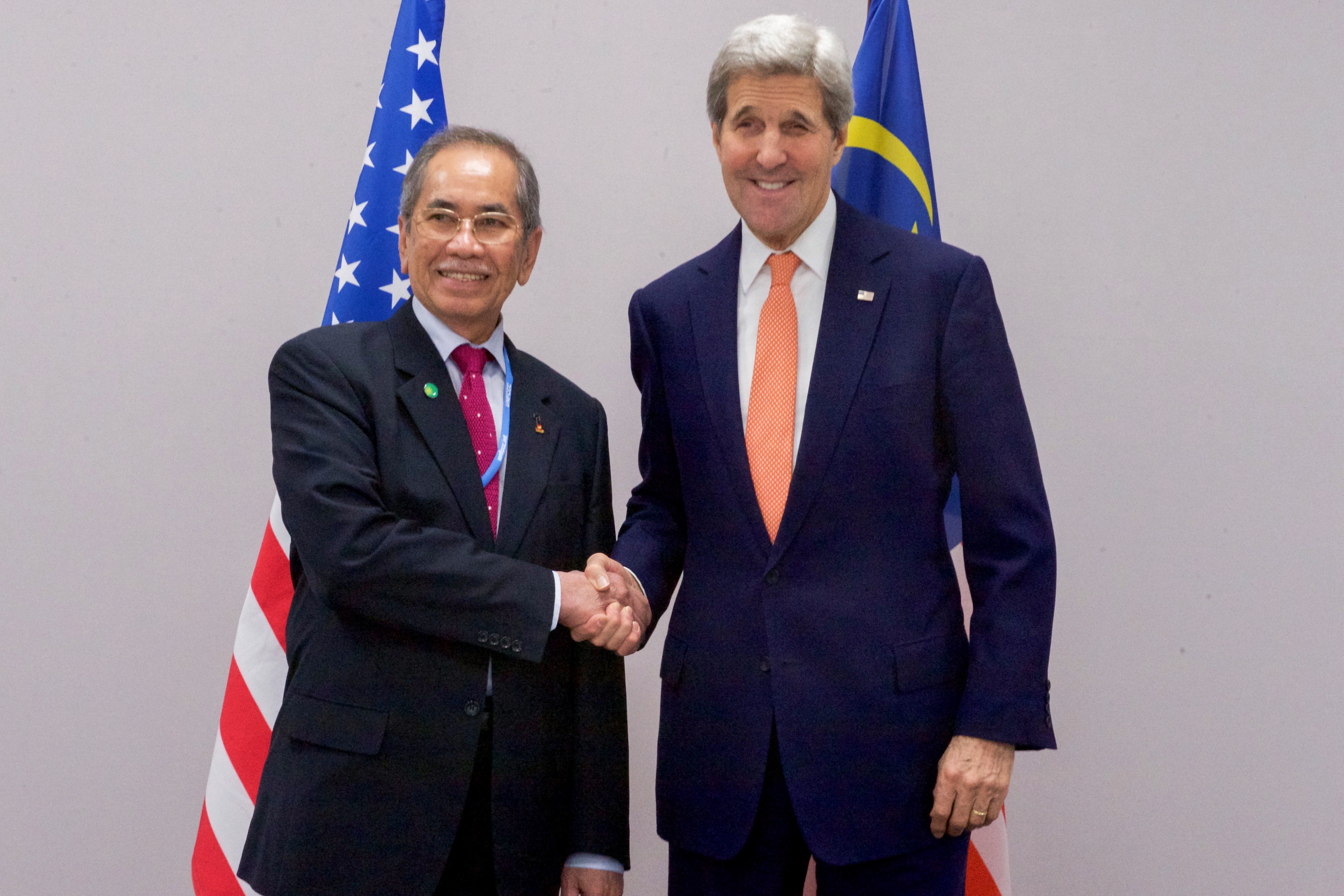
Wan Junaidi and US Secretary of State John Kerry

In July 2015, Najib announced a Cabinet reshuffle that appointed Wan Junaidi as Minister of Natural Resources and Environment, making him the second minister from Sarawak to hold this office after Adenan Satem. He saw his appointment as potentially beneficial for Sarawak's interests, particularly in advocating for increased royalties from oil and gas resources. He believed that having a representative from Sarawak in such ministry could facilitate smoother communication with the federal government, especially concerning the claim process involving Petronas. His commitment to sustainable resource management earned him praise from ministry staff, who dubbed him the "Great Minister".

In November 2016, Wan Junaidi led Malaysia's delegation to the 22nd session of the Conference of the Parties (COP22) to the Paris Agreement on climate change in Marrakesh, Morocco, reaffirming Malaysia's commitment to addressing climate change. Malaysia ratified the Paris Agreement, becoming the 111th country to do so. Wan Junaidi also established the Malaysia Pavilion to showcase the country's efforts in combating climate change, with a focus on forest management and renewable energy. He also championed biodiversity issues at the Biological Diversity Convention in Cancun, Mexico, leading to the enactment of the National Biodiversity Policy 2016-2025, which guides biodiversity management in Malaysia.

Under Wan Junaidi's leadership, Malaysia was proposed by Guatemala to chair the Group of Like-Minded Megadiverse Countries (LMMC), representing the Asian region from 2017 to 2018.

=== Minister of Entrepreneur Development and Cooperatives (2020–2021) ===
In February 2020, a significant political development led to the collapse of the ruling Pakatan Harapan (PH) coalition government and the subsequent resignation of Prime Minister Mahathir Mohamad, who had been in power for 22 months. Following these events, the Perikatan Nasional (PN) coalition government, headed by Prime Minister Muhyiddin Yassin, assumed power. Under Muhyiddin cabinet, Wan Junaidi returned back to serve in the Cabinet as Minister of Entrepreneur Development and Cooperatives.

During the onset of the pandemic, the ministry allocated RM200 million under the Additional Economic Stimulus Package (Rakyat Prihatin PKS) to support micro-entrepreneurs affected by the crisis in April. A total of 33,000 micro entrepreneurs were targeted to benefit from the Covid Business Recovery Micro (CBRM) Scheme, with grants of up to RM10,000 each. This scheme provided essential capital injection financing to help affected entrepreneurs recover and revive their businesses without any additional charges. It was open to businesses across all sectors, offering a maximum repayment period of three years with a six-month repayment grace period. Even blacklisted entrepreneurs were considered for assistance on a case-by-case basis. In June, the government introduced the National Economic Recovery Plan (PENJANA) to help small and medium-sized enterprises (SME) recover from the economic downturn. Through PENJANA, the government provided financial assistance, promoted digital transformation, and offered targeted sectoral support. Financial aid included a matching grant of RM140 million to facilitate the transition to online services, while incentives and programmes like PENJANA SME Financing and tax relief measures aimed to alleviate financial burdens and stimulate growth. Additionally, initiatives like the e-commerce campaign and technical support programmes bolstered efforts to enhance business resilience and competitiveness in the digital economy.

In August, Wan Junaidi found himself in a situation where he lacked knowledge about the allocation of RM20 million in public funds invested in Aerodyne Ventures Sdn. Bhd. for the flying car project during the rule of PH government, stating that the funds had already been donated to certain parties. He said the private sector's leadership in the development of the flying car industry, with the government acting as a facilitator for SME entrepreneurs in drone services. Responding to the Public Accounts Committee's call for an audit of the investment, he acknowledged the involvement of VentureTech Sdn. Bhd. in channeling the funds to Aerodyne.

Subsequent to Muhyiddin's resignation as Prime Minister on 16 August 2021 after the loss of the government's majority amid the ongoing political crisis, his cabinet was dissolved.

=== Minister of Parliament and Law (2021–2022) ===
After Muhyiddin's resignation, Ismail Sabri Yaakob was appointed to succeed him. In his cabinet, Ismail Sabri named Wan Junaidi as Minister of Parliament and Law in the Prime Minister's Department.

In December 2021, the portfolio under Wan Junaidi was recognised for its outstanding performance. This recognition was based on research conducted by independent research bodies, the ILHAM Centre and O2 Research Malaysia (O2), which evaluated the achievements of ministries under the 100-day key performance indicator (KPI). The ministry was ranked third, following the Ministry of Health and the Ministry of Finance.

As law minister, Wan Junaidi played a pivotal role in integrating the Malaysia Agreement 1963 (MA63) into ongoing negotiations between the federal government and the Sarawak and Sabah government. One of the most notable achievements was the amendment of Article 160 of the Federal Constitution which restored some of Sarawak's eroded rights by incorporating provisions from MA63, the Cobbold Report, and the Intergovernmental Committee (IGC) report into the constitution. Wan Junaidi's leadership also facilitated the implementation of various policies affecting Sarawak, including education policies and membership in the inland revenue board.

Wan Junaidi also spearheaded a constitutional amendment to ban MPs from party hopping. In July 2022, the Dewan Rakyat successfully passed this bill with a majority of over two-thirds. The bill also got the support of 52 out of 60 senators through block voting in the Senate. With the enforcement of the act, MPs who leave their party will lose their membership.

Wan Junaidi also streamlined the voter registration process for 18 years old, also known as "Undi18". In September 2021, the Kuching High Court issued an order directing the government to lower the voting age from 21 to 18 years old and to implement automatic voter registration by the end of December. In March 2022, a constitutional amendment concerning the new minimum voting age and automatic voter registration was ratified under the direction of Wan Junaidi. Following the implementation of the 18-year voting age qualification and automatic voter registration, all Malaysian citizens aged 18 and above who meet the eligibility criteria will be automatically enrolled, without any exceptions.

== President of the Dewan Negara (2023–2024) ==
On 16 June 2023, Wan Junaidi confirmed that the government had nominated him as the new 19th President of the Dewan Negara, three days prior, on 13 June, to replace Rais Yatim, who had stepped down as President and Senator following the expiration of his term on 15 June. He expressed his readiness and willingness to assume the position and its associated responsibilities. He also regarded this as an opportunity to continue his work of reforming the Parliament, similar to his previous efforts during his term as the Minister in the Prime Minister's Department in charge of Parliament and Law. In this regard, he sought support from the government, fellow Senators, and Members of Parliament (MPs).

On 18 June, it was reported that Wan Junaidi would officially be appointed and sworn into office the following day, on 19 June, following the approval of his nomination by Yang di-Pertuan Agong Al-Sultan Abdullah Ri'ayatuddin Al-Mustafa Billah Shah. He emphasised that his swearing-in ceremony would adhere to the law and constitution and noted that he was the sole candidate from the government.

On 19 June, Wan Junaidi was officially appointed and sworn into both the offices of Senator and President. His candidacy as President was nominated by Prime Minister Anwar Ibrahim and seconded by Minister of Investment, Trade and Industry Tengku Zafrul Aziz. His election to the office was uncontested, as there were no other candidates from the Opposition.

In his speech outlining his agendas after the swearing-in ceremony, Wan Junaidi expressed his commitment to prioritise the implementation of the code of ethics for Senators, reintroduce the Parliamentary Services Act, amend the Houses of Parliament (Privilege and Powers) Act 1952, and revise the Dewan Negara Regulations to strengthen the role of committees in Parliament. These efforts aimed to improve and transform the institution. Additionally, he cautioned fellow Senators against excessive politicking and internal conflicts within the house.

On 19 January 2024, he was reported to have resigned as President of the Dewan Negara and Senator to assume the office as the Yang di-Pertua Negeri of Sarawak. He and other Sarawak leaders neither confirmed nor denied.

== Yang di-Pertua Negeri of Sarawak (2024–present) ==
A week later on 26 January 2024, it was confirmed that Wan Junaidi would be the Yang di-Pertua Negeri of Sarawak. He was appointed to the position to replace Abdul Taib Mahmud who had been in the position for almost a decade. The appointment took effect immediately and received widespread praises from the Sarawak leaders. He was sworn in three days later on 29 January 2024 in a ceremony attended by Premier of Sarawak Abang Abdul Rahman Johari Abang Openg, Chief Judge of Sabah and Sarawak, Abdul Rahman Sebli, Pending MLA Violet Yong and other state government leaders as well as Sarawak MLAs.

== Personal life ==
Wan Junaidi married Feona Sim @ Norjanah in 1972, and together they had three daughters: Sharifah Fariah, Sharifah Nong-Jasima, and Sharifah Nuril Barieyah. In 2022, Feona died at the age of 70 due to internal bleeding at Borneo Medical Centre in Kuching. That same year, Wan Junaidi married Fauziah Mohd Sanusi.

== Election results ==
Parliament of Malaysia
Year	Constituency	Candidate	Votes	Pct	Opponent(s)	Votes	Pct	Ballots cast	Majority	Turnout
1990	P162 Batang Lupar	Wan Junaidi Tuanku Jaafar (PBB)	5,795	54.43%	Wan Habib Mahmud (PERMAS)	3,130	29.40%	10,813	2,665	66.97%
1990	P162 Batang Lupar	Wan Junaidi Tuanku Jaafar (PBB)	5,795	54.43%	Abang Ismail Abd. Hadari (IND)	1,722	16.17%	10,813	2,665	66.97%
1995	P174 Batang Lupar	Wan Junaidi Tuanku Jaafar (PBB)	N/A	N/A	Unopposed					
1999	P175 Batang Lupar	Wan Junaidi Tuanku Jaafar (PBB)	7,903	74.61%	Syid Assimie Ismail (STAR)	2,689	25.39%	10,944	5,214	57.85%
2004	P193 Santubong	Wan Junaidi Tuanku Jaafar (PBB)	12,590	86.11%	Idris Bohari (IND)	2,030	13.89%	14,902	10,560	64.13%
2008	P193 Santubong	Wan Junaidi Tuanku Jaafar (PBB)	15,800	80.39%	Rahamat Idil Latip (PKR)	3,855	19.61%	19,959	11,945	64.73%
2013	P193 Santubong	Wan Junaidi Tuanku Jaafar (PBB)	24,655	85.57%	Zulrusdi Mohamad Hol (PKR)	3,719	12.91%	29,286	20,936	79.12%
2013	P193 Santubong	Wan Junaidi Tuanku Jaafar (PBB)	24,655	85.57%	Affendi Jeman (IND)	233	0.81%	29,286	20,936	79.12%
2013	P193 Santubong	Wan Junaidi Tuanku Jaafar (PBB)	24,655	85.57%	Mura Kadir (STAR)	206	0.71%	29,286	20,936	79.12%
2018	P193 Santubong	Wan Junaidi Tuanku Jaafar (PBB)	26,379	79.28%	Mohd Fidzuan Zaidi (AMANAH)	6,894	20.72%	33,868	19,485	74.23%

== Honours ==
=== Honours of Malaysia ===
- Malaysia
  - Grand Commander of the Order of the Defender of the Realm (SMN) – Tun (2024)
  - Commander of the Order of Loyalty to the Crown of Malaysia (PSM) – Tan Sri (2023)
  - Commander of the Order of Meritorious Service (PJN) – Datuk (2003)
  - Companion of the Order of Loyalty to the Crown of Malaysia (JSM) (2000)
  - Recipient of the Loyal Service Medal (PPS)
  - Recipient of the General Service Medal (PPA)
  - Recipient of the National Hero Service Medal (PJPN)
  - Recipient of the 14th Yang di-Pertuan Agong Installation Medal
  - Recipient of the 15th Yang di-Pertuan Agong Installation Medal
  - Recipient of the 17th Yang di-Pertuan Agong Installation Medal
- Sarawak
  - Grand Master and Grand Principal of the Most Exalted Order of the Star of Sarawak (SBS) – Pehin Sri (2024)
  - Grand Commander of the Most Exalted Order of the Star of Sarawak (PNBS) – Dato Sri (2014)
  - Companion of the Most Exalted Order of the Star of Sarawak (JBS) (1998)
  - Officer of the Most Exalted Order of the Star of Sarawak (PBS) (1992)
  - Recipient of the Sarawak Independence Ruby Jubilee Medal (2003)
  - Recipient of the Sarawak Independence Golden Jubilee Medal (2013)
  - Gold Medal of the Sarawak Independence Diamond Jubilee Medal (2023)
- Malacca
  - Grand Commander of the Exalted Order of Malacca (DGSM) – Datuk Seri (2017)
- Perlis
  - Recipient of Tuanku Syed Sirajuddin Jamalullail Silver Jubilee Medal (2025)

== Bibliography ==
=== Books ===
- Evolusi Parlimen dan Evolusi Speaker Parlimen Malaysia (2010) ISBN 9789834943073
- Falsafah Moral Ilmu Berpengakap (2007) ISBN 9836294597

Political offices
Preceded by Lee Chee Leong	Deputy Minister of Home Affairs; 16 May 2013 - 29 July 2015	Succeeded by Nur Jazlan Mohamed
Preceded by Palanivel Govindasamy	Minister of Natural Resources and Environment; 29 July 2015 - 9 May 2018	Succeeded by Yeo Bee Yin
Preceded by Mohd Redzuan Md Yusof	Minister of Entrepreneur Development and Co-operatives; 10 March 2020 - 16 August 2021	Succeeded by Noh Omar
Preceded by Takiyuddin Hassan	Minister in the Prime Minister's Department; 30 August 2021 - 24 November 2022	Succeeded by Azalina Othman Said
Preceded by Tan Sri Dato' Seri Utama Rasi Yatim	President of the Dewan Negara; 19 June 2023 - 18 January 2024	Succeeded by Datuk Mutang Tagal
Preceded by Tun Pehin Sri Abdul Taib Mahmud	Yang di-Pertua Negeri of Sarawak; 26 January 2024 - Present	Succeeded by Incumbent
