= Machang (federal constituency) =

Federal constituency of Kelantan, Malaysia

Machang (P029)
Kelantan constituency
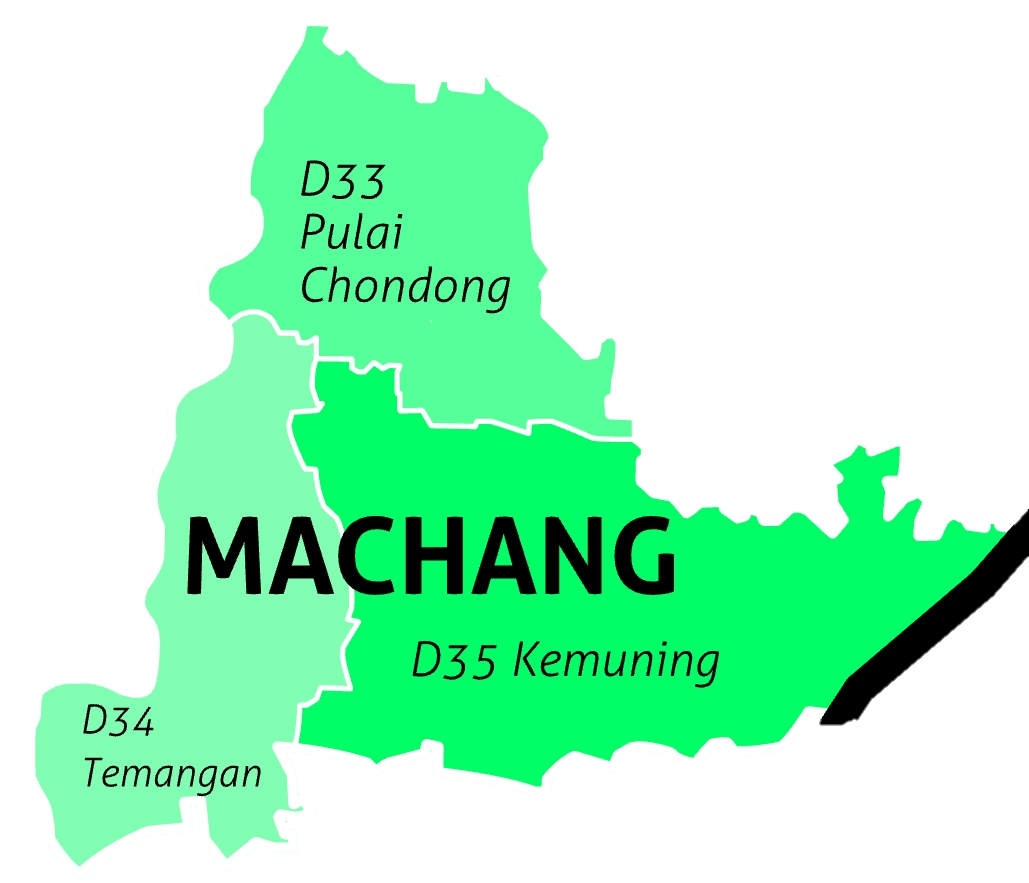

Federal constituency
- Legislature: Dewan Rakyat
- MP: Wan Ahmad Fayhsal Wan Ahmad Kamal; PN
- Constituency created: 1974
- First contested: 1974
- Last contested: 2022

Demographics
- Population (2020): 110,545
- Electors (2023): 89,196
- Area (km²): 528
- Pop. density (per km²): 209.4

Machang is a federal constituency in Machang District, Kelantan, Malaysia, that has been represented in the Dewan Rakyat since 1974.

The federal constituency was created in the 1974 redistribution and is mandated to return a single member to the Dewan Rakyat under the first past the post voting system.

== Demographics ==
https://live.chinapress.com.my/ge15/parliament/KELANTAN

Ethnic breakdown of Macahng's electorate as of 2022
1. Malay (96.6%)
2. Chinese (3.10%)
3. Indian (0.20%)
4. Other ethnicities (0.10%)

As of 2020, Machang has a population of 110,545 people.

Age breakdown of Machang's electorate as of 2022
1. 18-20 (6.57%)
2. 21-29 (23.1%)
3. 30-39 (24.2%)
4. 40-49 (16.9%)
5. 50-59 (13.6%)
6. 60-69 (9.68%)
7. 70-79 (4.44%)
8. 80-89 (1.29%)
9. above 90 (0.27%)
Gender breakdown of Machang's electorate as of 2022
1. Male (49.3%)
2. Female (50.7%)

== History ==
=== Polling districts ===
According to the federal gazette issued on 18 July 2023, the Machang constituency is divided into 36 polling districts.

State constituency	Polling Districts	Code	Location
Pulai Chondong (N33）	Kampung Bandar	029/33/01	SK Bandar
Pulai Chondong (N33）	Alor Melaka	029/33/02	Maahad Syamsul Maarif (P)
Pulai Chondong (N33）	Merbau Chondong	029/33/03	SJK (C) Poey Sit
Pulai Chondong (N33）	Kedai Pulai Chondong	029/33/04	SK Pulai Chondong
Pulai Chondong (N33）	Pangkal Gong	029/33/05	SK Pangkal Gong
Pulai Chondong (N33）	Kerawang	029/33/06	SK Pangkal Nering
Pulai Chondong (N33）	Bagan	029/33/07	SK Mata Ayer
Pulai Chondong (N33）	Kampung Tok Bok	029/33/08	SMK Abdul Samad
Pulai Chondong (N33）	Joh	029/33/09	Maahad Syamsul Maarif (L)
Pulai Chondong (N33）	Labok	029/33/10	SK Tok Bok
Pulai Chondong (N33）	Kampung Binjal	029/33/11	SK Labok
Pulai Chondong (N33）	Dewan	029/33/12	SK Dewan Besar
Temangan (N34）	Simpul Berlubang	029/34/01	SK Pangkal Mak Wan
Temangan (N34）	Kelaweh	029/34/02	SK Kelaweh
Temangan (N34）	Pak Roman	029/34/03	SK Pak Roman
Temangan (N34）	Pangkal Meleret	029/34/04	SK Pangkal Meleret
Temangan (N34）	Paloh Rawa	029/34/05	SK Paloh Rawa
Temangan (N34）	Batu 30	029/34/06	SK Pangkal Jenereh
Temangan (N34）	Kampung Raja	029/34/07	SK Kampong Pek
Temangan (N34）	Kampung Pauh	029/34/08	SK Temangan
Temangan (N34）	Bandar Temangan	029/34/09	SJK (C) Chung Hwa
Temangan (N34）	Kampung Kerilla	029/34/10	SK Kampung Kerilla
Temangan (N34）	Pangkal Chuit	029/34/11	SMU (A) Al-Hasaniah Pangkal Jenerih
Kemuning (N35）	Sungai Hala	029/35/01	SMK Hamzah
Kemuning (N35）	Kweng Hitam	029/35/02	SMK Machang
Kemuning (N35）	Pangkal Changgong	029/35/03	SMA Wataniah
Kemuning (N35）	Bandar Lama	029/35/04	SK Machang (1)
Kemuning (N35）	Bandar Bharu	029/35/05	SK Hamzah (1)
Kemuning (N35）	Bukit Tiu	029/35/06	SK Bukit Tiu
Kemuning (N35）	Ulu Sat	029/35/07	SK Belukar
Kemuning (N35）	Banggol Judah	029/35/08	SMU (A) Ahmadiah Banggol Judah
Kemuning (N35）	Bakar	029/35/09	SMK Hamzah (2)
Kemuning (N35）	Kemuning	029/35/10	SK Ayer Merah
Kemuning (N35）	Cherang Hangus	029/35/11	SK Jambu Lawar
Kemuning (N35）	Kampung Pek	029/35/12	SMK Seri Intan
Kemuning (N35）	Kampung Bunut	029/35/13	SMK Seri Intan

=== Representation history ===
Members of Parliament for Machang
Parliament	No	Years	Member	Party	Vote Share
Constituency created from Tanah Merah, Ulu Kelantan and Pasir Puteh
4th	P024	1974–1978	Abdullah Ahmad (عبدالله احمد)	BN (UMNO)	13,183; 71.80%
5th	P024	1978–1982	Mohd. Kassim Ahmed (محمد. كسسيم احمد)	BN (UMNO)	11,707; 58.04%
6th	P024	1982–1986	Mohd. Kassim Ahmed (محمد. كسسيم احمد)	BN (UMNO)	13,224; 55.45%
7th	P027	1986–1990	Mohd. Kassim Ahmed (محمد. كسسيم احمد)	BN (UMNO)	11,110; 53.35%
8th	P027	1990–1995	Ahmad Shukri Hassan (احمد شكري حسن)	S46	15,944; 65.23%
9th	P029	1995–1999	Sukri Mohamed (سوكري محمد)	S46	15,998; 55.25%
10th	P029	1999–2004	Mohd Yusoff Mohd Nor (محمد يوسف محمد نور)	BA (PAS)	20,010; 60.45%
11th	P029	2004–2008	Sazmi Miah (سزمي ميه)	BN (UMNO)	17,464; 50.19%
12th	P029	2008–2013	Saifuddin Nasution Ismail (سيف الدين ناسوتيون إسماعيل)	PR (PKR)	21,041; 51.80%
13th	P029	2013–2018	Ahmad Jazlan Yaakub (أحمد جزلان يعقوب)	BN (UMNO)	25,660; 50.80%
14th	P029	2018–2022	Ahmad Jazlan Yaakub (أحمد جزلان يعقوب)	BN (UMNO)	26,076; 47.39%
15th	P029	2022–2026	Wan Ahmad Fayhsal Wan Ahmad Kamal (وان أحمد فيصل وان أحمد کمال)	PN (BERSATU)	35,603; 54.68%
15th	P029	2026	Wan Ahmad Fayhsal Wan Ahmad Kamal (وان أحمد فيصل وان أحمد کمال)	Independent	35,603; 54.68%
15th	P029	2026–present	Wan Ahmad Fayhsal Wan Ahmad Kamal (وان أحمد فيصل وان أحمد کمال)	PN (WAWASAN)	35,603; 54.68%

=== State constituency ===
Parliamentary constituency	State constituency						
Parliamentary constituency	1955–1959*	1959–1974	1974–1986	1986–1995	1995–2004	2004–2018	2018–present
Machang			Bandar Machang				
Machang				Banggol Judah			
Machang				Gual Ipoh			
Machang					Kemuning		
Machang				Labok			
Machang			Pulai Chondong		Pulai Chondong		
Machang			Sungei Rasau				
Machang						Temangan	

=== Historical boundaries ===
State Constituency	Area				
State Constituency	1974	1984	1994	2003	2018
Bandar Machang	Banggol Judah; Kampung Bata; Kampung Wakaf Beta; Machang; Ulu Sat				
Banggol Judah		Banggol Judah; Kampung Baka; Kampung Jakar; Pangkal Chuit; Ulu Sat	Banggol Judah; Kampung Baka; Kampung Wakaf Bata; Kemuning; Machang		
Gual Ipoh		Dusun Durian Chabang; Gual Periok; Kuala Tiga; Kusial Bharu; Peralla			
Kemuning			Kampung Jakar; Kampung Kuala Hau; Kemuning; Pangkal Chuit; Temangan	Banggol Judah; Kampung Baka; Kemuning; Machang; Ulu Sat	
Labok		Kampung Batu Belah; Kampung Joh; Kampung Wakaf Bata; Labok; Machang			
Pulai Chondong	Bukit Merbau; Kampung Jenereh Bongkok; Kampung Kemahang; Pulai Chondong; Tok Bok		Bukit Merbau; Kampung Jenereh Bongkok; Kampung Kemahang; Tok Bok; Pulai Chondong		
Sungei Rasau	Gaal; Kampung Bukit; Kampung Gong Kelih; Kampung Tok Kamis; Sungai Rasau				
Temangan				Kampung Kuala Hau; Kampung Paloh Rawa; Kampung Wakaf Beta; Pangkal Meleret; Temangan	

=== Current state assembly members ===
No.	State Constituency	Member	Coalition (Party)
N33	Pulai Chondong	Azhar Salleh	PN (PAS)
N34	Temangan	Mohamed Fadzli Hassan	PN (PAS)
N35	Kemuning	Ahmad Zakhran Mat Noor	PN (PAS)

=== Local governments & postcodes ===
No.	State Constituency	Local Government	Postcode
N33	Pulai Chondong	Machang District Council	16600 Pulai Chondong; 18400 Temangan; 18500 Machang
N34	Temangan	Machang District Council	16600 Pulai Chondong; 18400 Temangan; 18500 Machang
N35	Kemuning	Machang District Council	16600 Pulai Chondong; 18400 Temangan; 18500 Machang

== Election results ==
Malaysian general election, 2022
Party	Candidate	Votes	%	∆%
PAS	Wan Ahmad Fayhsal Wan Ahmad Kamal	35,603	54.68	▲12.42
BN	Ahmad Jazlan Yaakub	25,449	39.08	▼8.31
PH	Rosli Allani Abdul Kadir	3,934	6.04	▲6.04
PUTRA	Mohammad Seman	128	0.20	▲0.20
Total valid votes		65,114	100.00	
Total rejected ballots		733		
Unreturned ballots		177		
Turnout		66,024	73.31	▼9.04
Registered electors		88,825		
Majority		10,154	15.60	▲10.47
PAS gain from BN		Swing		?
Source(s) https://lom.agc.gov.my/ilims/upload/portal/akta/outputp/1753266/PUB%20607%20(2022).pdf

Malaysian general election, 2018
Party	Candidate	Votes	%	∆%
BN	Ahmad Jazlan Yaakub	26,076	47.39	▼3.41
PAS	Zulkifli Mamat	23,252	42.26	▲42.26
PKR	Sazmi Miah	5,695	10.35	▼38.85
Total valid votes		55,023	100.00	
Total rejected ballots		801		
Unreturned ballots		496		
Turnout		56,320	82.35	▼4.39
Registered electors		68,387		
Majority		2,824	5.13	▲3.53
BN hold		Swing		
Source(s) "His Majesty's Government Gazette - Notice of Contested Election, Parliament for the State of Kelantan [P.U. (B) 234/2018]" (PDF). Attorney General's Chambers of Malaysia. 3 May 2018. "Federal Government Gazette - Results of Contested Election and Statements of the Poll after the Official Addition of Votes, Parliamentary Constituencies for the State of Kelantan [P.U. (B) 308/2018]" (PDF). Attorney General's Chambers of Malaysia. 28 May 2018.

Malaysian general election, 2013
Party	Candidate	Votes	%	∆%
BN	Ahmad Jazlan Yaakub	25,660	50.80	▲2.60
PKR	Wan Zawawi Wan Ismail	24,855	49.20	▼2.60
Total valid votes		50,515	100.00	
Total rejected ballots		729		
Unreturned ballots		128		
Turnout		51,372	86.74	▲2.33
Registered electors		59,226		
Majority		805	1.60	▼2.00
BN gain from PKR		Swing		?
Source(s) "Federal Government Gazette - Notice of Contested Election, Parliament for the State of Kelantan [P.U. (B) 171/2013]" (PDF). Attorney General's Chambers of Malaysia. 26 April 2013. "Federal Government Gazette - Results of Contested Election and Statements of the Poll after the Official Addition of Votes, Parliamentary Constituencies for the State of Kelantan [P.U. (B) 212/2013]" (PDF). Attorney General's Chambers of Malaysia. 22 May 2013. Archived from the original (PDF) on 2019-12-29.

Malaysian general election, 2008
Party	Candidate	Votes	%	∆%
PKR	Saifuddin Nasution Ismail	21,041	51.80	▲51.80
BN	Sazmi Miah	19,581	48.20	▼1.99
Total valid votes		40,622	100.00	
Total rejected ballots		748		
Unreturned ballots		124		
Turnout		41,494	84.41	▲3.74
Registered electors		49,157		
Majority		1,460	3.60	▲3.22
PKR gain from BN		Swing		?

Malaysian general election, 2004
Party	Candidate	Votes	%	∆%
BN	Sazmi Miah	17,464	50.19	▲10.64
PAS	Mohd Yusoff Mohd Nor	17,329	49.81	▼10.64
Total valid votes		34,793	100.00	
Total rejected ballots		599		
Unreturned ballots		0		
Turnout		35,392	80.67	▲2.93
Registered electors		43,872		
Majority		135	0.38	▼20.52
BN gain from PAS		Swing		?

Malaysian general election, 1999
Party	Candidate	Votes	%	∆%
PAS	Mohd Yusoff Mohd Nor	20,010	60.45	▲60.45
BN	Sukri Mohamed	13,091	39.55	▼5.20
Total valid votes		33,101	100.00	
Total rejected ballots		453		
Unreturned ballots		33		
Turnout		33,587	77.74	▲1.44
Registered electors		43,204		
Majority		6,919	20.90	▲10.40
PAS gain from S46		Swing		?

Malaysian general election, 1995
Party	Candidate	Votes	%	∆%
S46	Sukri Mohamed	15,998	55.25	▼9.98
BN	Muhammad Hamzah	12,959	44.75	▲11.17
Total valid votes		28,957	100.00	
Total rejected ballots		889		
Unreturned ballots		75		
Turnout		29,921	76.30	▼3.91
Registered electors		39,214		
Majority		3,039	10.50	▼21.15
S46 hold		Swing		

Malaysian general election, 1990
Party	Candidate	Votes	%	∆%
S46	Ahmad Shukri Hassan	15,944	65.23	▲65.23
BN	Mohd. Kassim Ahmed	8,206	33.58	▼19.77
Independent	Wan Ismail Wan Ahmad	292	1.19	▲1.19
Total valid votes		24,442	100.00	
Total rejected ballots		707		
Unreturned ballots		0		
Turnout		25,149	80.21	▲2.54
Registered electors		31,353		
Majority		7,738	31.65	▲24.95
S46 gain from BN		Swing		?

Malaysian general election, 1986
Party	Candidate	Votes	%	∆%
BN	Mohd. Kassim Ahmed	11,110	53.35	▼2.10
PAS	Wan Ismail Wan Ahmad	9,713	46.65	▲2.10
Total valid votes		20,823	100.00	
Total rejected ballots		483		
Unreturned ballots		0		
Turnout		21,306	77.67	▼5.22
Registered electors		27,430		
Majority		1,397	6.70	▼4.20
BN hold		Swing		

Malaysian general election, 1982
Party	Candidate	Votes	%	∆%
BN	Mohd. Kassim Ahmed	13,224	55.45	▼2.59
PAS	Yaacob Yusof	10,624	44.55	▲2.59
Total valid votes		23,848	100.00	
Total rejected ballots		555		
Unreturned ballots		0		
Turnout		24,403	82.89	
Registered electors		29,441		
Majority		2,600	10.90	▼5.18
BN hold		Swing		

Malaysian general election, 1978
Party	Candidate	Votes	%	∆%
BN	Mohd. Kassim Ahmed	11,707	58.04	▼13.76
PAS	Wan Ismail Wan Ahmad	8,465	41.96	▲41.96
Total valid votes		20,172	100.00	
Total rejected ballots		118		
Unreturned ballots		0		
Turnout		20,290	78.92	▲3.46
Registered electors		25,709		
Majority		3,242	16.08	▼27.52
BN hold		Swing		

Malaysian general election, 1974
Party	Candidate	Votes	%
BN	Abdullah Ahmad	13,183	71.80
Independent	Mohamed Yusoff Mohamed Nor	5,177	28.20
Total valid votes		18,360	100.00
Total rejected ballots		796	
Unreturned ballots		0	
Turnout		19,156	75.46
Registered electors		25,386	
Majority		8,006	43.60
This was a new constituency created.
