= Abdullah Ahmad =

Malaysian journalist and politician

Yang Berbahagia Tan Sri Abdullah Ahmad PSM SSAP SJMK DGPN PNBS DSAP DPMK ADK

Deputy Minister in the Prime Minister's Department
- In office 1974–1976

Member of the Malaysian Parliament for Machang
- In office 1974–1978
- Preceded by: constituency created
- Succeeded by: Mohd Kassim @ Yahya Ahmad

Personal details
- Born: 4 July 1933 Machang, Kelantan, Unfederated Malay States, British Malaya (now Malaysia)
- Died: 12 June 2016 (aged 82) Kuala Lumpur, Malaysia
- Party: United Malays National Organisation (UMNO) (–2016)
- Spouse: Fauzah Mohamad Darus
- Occupation: Academic, politician, writer

Abdullah bin Ahmad (4 July 1933 – 12 June 2016) more widely known as Dollah Kok Lanas, was a Malaysian journalist and politician from the United Malays National Organisation (UMNO).

== Biography ==
Abdullah bin Ahmad was born on 4 July 1937 at Kampung Bandar, Machang, Kelantan. He received his early education at Sekolah Melayu Padang Garong in Kota Bharu before attending Malay College Kuala Kangsar. In 1960, he joined the Congressional Fellowship programme by operated by the American Political Science Association. He later attended Cambridge University, where he received a Master of Letters.

Initially a special officer and later political secretary to Abdul Razak Hussein, Abdullah reportedly held significant influence during the former's time as prime minister.

He became the head of UMNO's Machang division and its member of parliament in 1974, following which he was appointed deputy minister in the prime minister's department.

However, he was expelled from the party and arrested under the Internal Security Act (ISA) in 1976. According to Abdullah, Hussein had warned him beforehand that he would be arrested as a balancing act for the latter's plans to prosecute Harun Idris. Believing that he would be placed under house arrest for only six-months, Abdullah agreed

Abdullah was not the only individual arrested. Razak's former press secretary and deputy minister Abdullah Majid and New Straits Times Press group deputy-editor Abdul Samad Ismail also fell victim to the ISA and they were collectively dubbed "The Three Abduls". Under pressure from the government, Abdul Samad publicly confessed to being a communist, and implicated both Abdullah and Majid.

Abdullah was ultimately imprisoned at the Kamunting Detention Centre for five years, spending two them in solitary confinement, over alleged communist ties. A close ally of Mahathir Mohamad, Abdullah was released along with 17 other ISA detainees when Mahathir became prime minister in 1981.

Following his release, he re-joined UMNO and became the head of the party's Kok Lanas division, which was previously known as Machang. He became its member of parliament in 1986 until his defeat in 1990.

In 1995, he was made a member of Utusan Malaysia's board of directors and in 2000 he was made the New Straits Times Press group executive director, later becoming the group editor-in-chief.

He also served as the Malaysian special envoy to the United Nations from 1995 to 2000.

In 2003, he wrote an article criticising Saudi Arabian policies that aided the United States invasion of Iraq, Wahhabism, and the hypocrisy of Saudi royals. As a result, the Saudi government reduced Malaysian quota for haj, and Abdullah was fired from the New Straits Times Press group at the request of UMNO, then leading the government and the group's largest shareholder. His contract was initially set to expire in October 2004.

Ahmad died on 12 June 2016, after battling cancer. He was 82. His body was brought back to his hometown in Kok Lanas, Kelantan.

== Election results ==
Parliament of Malaysia
Year	Constituency	Candidate	Votes	Pct	Opponent(s)	Votes	Pct	Ballots cast	Majority	Turnout
1974	P024 Machang, Kelantan	Abdullah Ahmad (UMNO)	13,183	71.80%	Mohamed Yusoff Mohamed Nor (IND)	5,177	28.20%	19,156	8,006	75.46%

== Honours ==
- Malaysia
  - Commander of the Order of Loyalty to the Crown of Malaysia (PSM) – Tan Sri (1999)
- Kelantan
  - Companion of the Order of the Life of the Crown of Kelantan (JMK)
  - Knight Grand Commander of the Order of the Life of the Crown of Kelantan (SJMK) – Dato'
  - Knight Commander of the Order of the Crown of Kelantan (DPMK) – Dato'
- Pahang
  - Knight Companion of the Order of Sultan Ahmad Shah of Pahang (DSAP) – Dato' (2000)
  - Grand Knight of the Order of Sultan Ahmad Shah of Pahang (SSAP) – Dato' Sri (2002)
- Penang
  - Commander of the Order of the Defender of State (DGPN) – Dato' Seri (2002)
- Sabah
  - Member of the Order of Kinabalu (ADK)
- Sarawak
  - Knight Commander of the Most Exalted Order of the Star of Sarawak (PNBS) – formerly Dato', now Dato Sri
