= FELCRA Berhad =

Malaysian government-owned company

Felcra Berhad
- Company type: State-owned enterprise
- Predecessor: Federal Land Consolidation and Rehabilitation Authority (Felcra)
- Founded: 1966; 60 years ago
- Headquarters: Wisma Felcra, Lot 4780, Jalan Rejang, Setapak Jaya, Peti Surat 12254, 50772 Kuala Lumpur, Malaysia
- Key people: Ahmad Jazlan Yaakub, Chairman & Dato' Idris Lasim, Chief Executive Officer
- Parent: Minister of Finance Incorporated
- Website: www.felcra.com.my

Felcra Berhad is a corporate organisation wholly owned by the Malaysian Government, under the Minister of Finance (Incorporated).

Felcra Berhad was started off and initially established as a statutory body in 1966 with the name Federal Land Consolidation and Rehabilitation Authority (Felcra), with the objective to develop rural areas by helping the rural community to join in economic activities and to improve their living standards. Its goal is to create a dynamic, attractive and profitable rural sector.

It became a company in 1997, and was as of October 2018 reported to be managing 220,086 hectares of plantation and farmland of 111,684 Felcra settlers and their families, and 30,189 hectares of Felcra's own land.

== Subsidiaries ==
=== Owned ===
1. Felcra Plantation Services Sdn Bhd
2. Felcra Agro Industry Sdn Bhd
3. Felcra Urus Estet Sdn Bhd
4. Felcra Cambodia Private Limited
5. Felcra Processing & Engineering Sdn Bhd
6. Felcra Bina Sdn Bhd
7. Felcra Properties Sdn Bhd
8. Felcra Training & Consultancy Sdn Bhd
9. Felcra Education Services Sdn Bhd
10. Felcra Niaga Sdn Bhd
11. Felcra Bekalan & Perkhidmatan Sdn Bhd
12. Felcra Livestock & Agri Product Sdn Bhd
13. Yayasan Felcra
14. Permodalan Felcra Sdn Bhd

=== Joint Venture ===
1. Felcra Daya Khas Plantation Sdn Bhd
2. Felcra Balingian Plantation Sdn Bhd
3. Felcra Ever Herald Sdn Bhd
4. Felcra Gedong Plantation Sdn Bhd
5. Felcra Sundar Awat-Awat Plantation Sdn Bhd
6. Felcra Pelita Jemoreng Sdn Bhd

=== Allied ===
1. Felcra Jaya Putra Sdn Bhd
2. Sinergi Perdana Sdn Bhd
3. Felcra Jaya Mukah Sdn Bhd
4. Felcra Jaya Samarahan Sdn Bhd
