= Ahmad Jazlan Yaakub =

Malaysian politician

Yang Berbahagia Dato' Sri Ahmad Jazlan Yaakub PJN SSAP DCSM DJMK
- أحمد جزلان يعقوب

Chairman of the FELCRA Berhad
- Incumbent
- Assumed office 15 March 2023
- Minister: Ahmad Zahid Hamidi
- Chief Executive Officer: Mohd Nazrul Izam Mansor
- Preceded by: Himself
- In office 1 October 2021 – 15 December 2022
- Minister: Mahdzir Khalid (2021–2022); Ahmad Zahid Hamidi (2022)
- Chief Executive Officer: Mohd Nazrul Izam Mansor
- Preceded by: Yamani Hafez Musa
- Succeeded by: Himself

Chairman of the Malaysian Palm Oil Board
- In office 8 April 2020 – 6 January 2021
- Minister: Khairuddin Razali
- Director General: Ahmad Parveez Ghulam Kadir
- Preceded by: Mohd Bakke Salleh
- Succeeded by: Larry Sng Wei Shien

Deputy Minister of Rural and Regional Development II
- In office 29 July 2015 – 10 May 2018 Serving with Alexander Nanta Linggi
- Monarchs: Abdul Halim (2015–2016); Muhammad V (2016–2018)
- Prime Minister: Najib Razak
- Minister: Ismail Sabri Yaakob
- Preceded by: Position Established
- Succeeded by: Sivarasa Rasiah
- Constituency: Machang

Chairman of the National Kenaf and Tobacco Board
- In office 1 February 2015 – 1 October 2015
- Minister: Douglas Uggah Embas
- Director General: Samsudin Noor
- Preceded by: Noor Zahidi Omar
- Succeeded by: Mohd Adhan Kechik

Member of the Malaysian Parliament for Machang
- In office 5 May 2013 – 19 November 2022
- Preceded by: Saifuddin Nasution Ismail (PR–PKR)
- Succeeded by: Wan Ahmad Fayhsal Wan Ahmad Kamal (PN–BERSATU)
- Majority: 805 (2013); 2,824 (2018)

Faction represented in Dewan Rakyat
- 2013–2022: Barisan Nasional

Personal details
- Born: Ahmad Jazlan bin Yaakub; 30 August 1964 (age 61) Bachok, Kelantan, Malaysia
- Citizenship: Malaysian
- Party: United Malays National Organisation (UMNO)
- Other political affiliations: Barisan Nasional (BN)
- Occupation: Politician
- Website: www.jazlanyaakub.com

Ahmad Jazlan bin Yaakub (Jawi: أحمد جزلان يعقوب; born 30 August 1964) is a Malaysian politician who has served as Chairman of the FELCRA Berhad for the second term since March 2023 and first term from October 2021 to December 2022. He served as the Member of Parliament (MP) for Machang from May 2013 to November 2022, Deputy Minister of Rural and Regional Development II in the Barisan Nasional (BN) administration under former Prime Minister Najib Razak and former Minister Ismail Sabri Yaakob from July 2015 to the collapse of the BN administration in May 2018, Chairman of Malaysian Palm Oil Board (MPOB) from April 2020 to his resignation in January 2021 and Chairman of the National Kenaf and Tobacco Board (LKTN) from February to October 2015. He is a member, State Chairman of Kelantan and Division Chief of Machang of the United Malays National Organisation (UMNO), a component party of the BN coalition.

== Background ==
=== Family ===
Ahmad Jazlan was born on 30 August 1964 in Jelawat, Bachok, Kelantan. The son of the late Haji Yaakub bin Muhamad, a retired schoolteacher cum businessman and the late Hajah Fatimah binti Jusoh, a housewife, he was the eldest son (but the third child) in a large family of 21 siblings.

His family moved to Machang after his father, who served as a teacher at the time, decided to stay in Machang after his retirement. After his retirement, his late father started a business involved in the sale of big cars, property development, plantation and real estate lease to locals in Machang, Bachok and Kota Bharu as early as the 1980s.

Ahmad Jazlan also helped his father manage the business as young as 18 years old. At early of his career, he was often assigned to Japan and the United Kingdom to select and buy used cars, and he chose to continue running the family business to help his siblings after his father's death. In addition, he also took on the role of head of the family to ensure that his younger siblings were not left out of school.

His mother was a housewife who devoted her entire time to taking care of household matters and raising children.

=== Marriage ===
He is currently involved in a polygamous marriage with Datin Hajjah Wan Norizan binti Wan Ismail and also Datin Hajjah Noorul Ain binti Mohmad Nor and from each marriage, he is a father of 6 children.

== Education ==
Ahmad Jazlan holds a Diploma in Entrepreneurship (Level 4) and an Advanced Diploma in Business Management before pursuing Master of Business Administration degree at the University of the West of Scotland with a thesis entitled Strategic Orientation in adopting an open approach to innovation on business performanceː A study on rural development.

Although in his early years he did not continue his studies to keep his younger siblings in line for education and he become the family heads after the late father died, he was very concerned about education and believed that only education could change our future and make a country developed. His philosophy of life is that education will not stop as long as we breathe.

== Administration Experience ==
Based on his experience and knowledge, Ahmad Jazlan has held several important positions in government administration, including:

2020 – 2021 chairman, Malaysian Palm Oil Board (MPOB)

2015 – 2018 Deputy Minister, Ministry of Rural and Regional Development (KKLW)

2015 Chairman, National Kenaf and Tobacco Board (LKTN)

2013 – 2016 chairman, Kelantan State Sports Council (MSN)

2004 – 2007 President, Kelantan FA (KAFA)

== Social Engagement / Non-Governmental Organizations (NGOs) ==
Ahmad Jazlan was very close to the community, he was also appointed by organizations for several positions including:

2018 – is currently the Senior Assistant Commissioner of the Malaysian Prison Department

2017–present Assistant Commissioner of the Volunteer Department of Malaysia (RELA)

2017 – 2018 Mentor (Deputy Minister) of Universities Malaysia Kelantan (UMK)

2017 – 2018 Mentor (Deputy Minister) of Sultan Idris Educational University (UPSI)

2016 – currently Assistant Commissioner of the Malaysian Defense Forces (APM)

2016 – currently the Chairman of the Machang Parliament Rural Development Council

2008 – currently the Chairman of Machang Parliament's Agricultural Development Council

1996 – 2001 Chairman of Machang District Sports Council

1996 – 2001 MAYC Youth Council chairman Machang District

== Engagement in politics ==
=== UMNO party ===
He became involved in the political landscape of Malaysia as early as age 25 to join the United Malays National Organization (UMNO) and started getting belief in the age of 31 years at the Machang. Among the positions that have been held since 1995 to date are:

2018 – now chairman, UMNO Kelantan Liaison Committees

2018 – now UMNO Malaysian High Supreme Council (MKT)

2008 – now the Division Chief, UMNO Machang Division

2014 – 2018 Deputy chairman, Kelantan UMNO Liaison Committees

2004 – 2008 Acting Head of Division, UMNO Machang Division

2004 – 2004 Deputy Division Head, UMNO Machang Division

1998 – 2001 Deputy Youth Chief of State, Kelantan UMNO Liaison

1997 – 1998 State Youth Secretary of State, Kelantan UMNO Liaison

1995 – 2001 Division Youth Chief, UMNO Machang Division

=== Withdrawal of support for Perikatan Nasional ===
On 9 January 2021, he personally and publicly announced his withdrawal of support and he was no longer aligned with PN as an MP although his coalition is, resulting in a hung parliament as the PN coalition led by Prime Minister Muhyiddin Yassin lost the majority support by commanding the support of only half (110 out) of 220 MPs (at least 111) in the Dewan Rakyat, Parliament. His withdrawal of support was the second one from his coalition after the withdrawal of support of Tengku Razaleigh Hamzah (Gua Musang MP).

=== Elections ===
Ahmad Jazlan had been contesting in the 2008 Malaysian General Elections for Kemuning state assembly state. However, he was defeated. In the 2013 Malaysian General Elections, he was elected to the Machang parliamentary seat and won. Ahmad Jazlan maintains victory in the same Parliament in the 2018 Malaysian General Elections.

== Election results ==
Kelantan State Legislative Assembly
Year	Constituency	Candidate	Votes	Pct	Opponent(s)	Votes	Pct	Ballots cast	Majority	Turnout
2008	N35 Kemuning	Ahmad Jazlan Yaakub (UMNO)	7,087	46.96%	Wan Ahmad Lutfi Wan Sulaiman (PAS)	8,003	53.04%	15,090	916	83.69%

Parliament of Malaysia
Year	Constituency	Candidate	Votes	Pct	Opponent(s)	Votes	Pct	Ballots cast	Majority	Turnout
2013	P029 Machang	Ahmad Jazlan Yaakub (UMNO)	25,660	50.80%	Wan Zawawi Wan Ismail (PKR)	24,855	49.20%	51,372	805	86.74%
2018	P029 Machang	Ahmad Jazlan Yaakub (UMNO)	26,076	47.39%	Zulkifli Mamat (PAS)	23,252	42.26%	56,320	2,824	82.35%
2018	P029 Machang	Ahmad Jazlan Yaakub (UMNO)	26,076	47.39%	Sazmi Miah (BERSATU)	5,695	10.35%	56,320	2,824	82.35%
2022	P029 Machang	Ahmad Jazlan Yaakub (UMNO)	25,449	39.08%	Wan Ahmad Fayhsal Wan Ahmad Kamal (BERSATU)	35,603	54.68%	66,024	10,154	73.31%
2022	P029 Machang	Ahmad Jazlan Yaakub (UMNO)	25,449	39.08%	Rosli Allani Abdul Kadir (PKR)	3,934	6.04%	66,024	10,154	73.31%
2022	P029 Machang	Ahmad Jazlan Yaakub (UMNO)	25,449	39.08%	Mohammad Seman (PUTRA)	128	0.20%	66,024	10,154	73.31%

== Honours ==
=== Honours of Malaysia ===
- Malaysia
  - Commander of the Order of Meritorious Service (PJN) – Datuk (2010)
- Kelantan
  - Knight Commander of the Order of the Life of the Crown of Kelantan (DJMK) – Dato' (2017)
- Malacca
  - Knight Commander of the Exalted Order of Malacca (DCSM) – Datuk Wira (2017)
- Pahang
  - Knight Grand Companion of the Order of Sultan Ahmad Shah of Pahang (SSAP) – Dato' Sri (2024)
