= Rohani Abdul Karim =

Malaysian politician

Yang Berbahagia Dato Sri Rohani Abdul Karim SSAP PNBS PGBK PKN
- روحاني بنت عبدالكريم
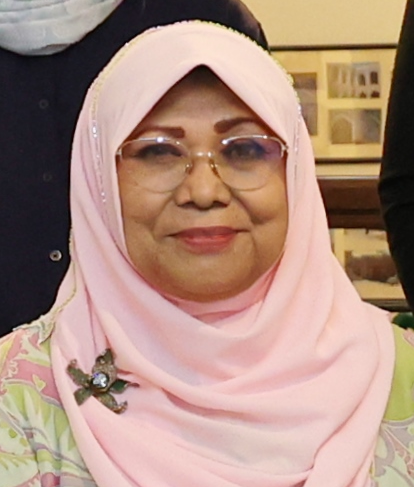
- Rohani in 2022

Minister of Women, Family and Community Development
- In office 16 May 2013 – 10 May 2018
- Monarchs: Abdul Halim (2013–2016); Muhammad V (2016–2018)
- Prime Minister: Najib Razak
- Deputy: Azizah Mohd Dun; Chew Mei Fun (2014–2018)
- Preceded by: Najib Razak (Acting)
- Succeeded by: Wan Azizah Wan Ismail
- Constituency: Batang Lupar

Deputy Minister of Domestic Trade, Cooperatives and Consumerism
- In office 4 June 2010 – 15 May 2013 Serving with Tan Lian Hoe
- Monarchs: Mizan Zainal Abidin (2010–2011); Abdul Halim (2011–2013)
- Prime Minister: Najib Razak
- Minister: Ismail Sabri Yaakob
- Preceded by: Position established
- Succeeded by: Ahmad Bashah Md Hanipah
- Constituency: Batang Lupar

Deputy Minister of Agriculture and Agro-based Industries
- In office 19 March 2008 – 4 June 2010 Serving with Mohd Johari Baharum (2009–2010)
- Monarch: Mizan Zainal Abidin
- Prime Minister: Abdullah Ahmad Badawi
- Minister: Mustapa Mohamed (2008–2009); Noh Omar (2009–2010)
- Preceded by: Mohd Shariff Omar; Mah Siew Keong
- Succeeded by: Chua Tee Yong
- Constituency: Batang Lupar

Member of the Malaysian Parliament for Batang Lupar
- In office 21 March 2004 – 19 November 2022
- Preceded by: Wan Junaidi Tuanku Jaafar (BN–PBB)
- Succeeded by: Mohamad Shafizan Kepli (GPS–PBB)
- Majority: Walkover (2004); 8,092 (2008); 10,964 (2013); 10,277 (2018)

Member of the Malaysian Parliament for Santubong
- In office 21 October 1990 – 21 March 2004
- Preceded by: Sulaiman Daud (BN–PBB)
- Succeeded by: Wan Junaidi Tuanku Jaafar (BN–PBB)
- Majority: 7,368 (1990); 9,911 (1995)< br> 1,895 (1999)

Faction represented in Dewan Rakyat
- 1990–2018: Barisan Nasional
- 2018: Parti Pesaka Bumiputera Bersatu
- 2018–2022: Gabungan Parti Sarawak

Personal details
- Born: Rohani binti Abdul Karim; 3 January 1955 (age 71) Crown Colony of Sarawak (now Sarawak, Malaysia)
- Party: Parti Pesaka Bumiputera Bersatu (PBB)
- Other political affiliations: Barisan Nasional (BN) (–2018); Gabungan Parti Sarawak (GPS) (since 2018)
- Children: 3
- Education: Universiti Pertanian Malaysia; Ohio University
- Occupation: Politician
- Website: datukrohanikarim.blogspot.com

Rohani binti Abdul Karim (Jawi: روحاني بنت عبدالكريم; born 3 January 1955) is a Malaysian politician who served as the Minister of Women, Family and Community Development, Deputy Minister of Domestic Trade, Cooperatives and Consumerism, Deputy Minister of Agriculture and Agro-based Industries in the Barisan Nasional (BN) administration under former Prime Ministers Abdullah Ahmad Badawi and Najib Razak and former Ministers Ismail Sabri Yaakob, Mustapa Mohamed and Noh Omar from March 2008 to the collapse of the BN administration in May 2018 as well as the Member of Parliament (MP) for Batang Lupar from March 2004 to November 2022 and for Santubong from October 1990 to March 2004. She is a member of the Parti Pesaka Bumiputera Bersatu (PBB), a component party of the Gabungan Parti Sarawak (GPS) and formerly BN coalitions.

== Early life ==
She was born on 3 January 1955 in Simanggang (now known as Sri Aman), Sarawak. She received her early education at SMK Methodist, Sibu. She has continued her education at Universiti Pertanian Malaysia in the field of agro-industry. She then resumed her studies until she obtained her Master of Business Administration (MBA) from Ohio University, Athens, USA. She has three children.

== Participation in politics ==
=== Become Member of Parliament and Cabinet Minister ===
In the 1990 general election, Rohani was elected as a candidate and won the Santubong parliamentary seat.

In the 1995 and 1999 general election, she was still able to defend the Santubong Parliamentary seat. In the 2004 general election, she had switched to the Batang Lupar, Sri Aman, Sarawak, where she was born, and won uncontested.

She once again won the Batang Lupar parliamentary seat against opposition party representatives in the 2008 general election with 70 percent of her vote in favour of her. Later she was appointed Deputy Minister of Agriculture and Agro-based Industry by the Malaysian Prime Minister Tun Abdullah Ahmad Badawi.

On 9 April 2009, Malaysia's sixth Prime Minister, Datuk Seri Najib Razak, who just held the leadership of the country at that time, entrusted her to take over Tan Lian Hoe's duties as Deputy Minister of Domestic Trade, Co-operatives and Consumerism.

On 15 May 2013, she was appointed Women and Family Development Minister in the Ministry of Women, Family and Community Development. She started her official duties as Minister on 17 May 2013.

=== Batang Lupar Member of Parliament ===
She is well-known for her outgoing personality in her constituency Batang Lupar. Her role as Deputy Minister meant most of her time was spent in Malaya. However, it did not stop her from going to the ground and meet with her constituents. Rohani is also IT-savvy, as evidenced by her frequent updates on her Twitter and Facebook pages.

== Election results ==
Parliament of Malaysia
Year	Constituency	Candidate	Votes	Pct	Opponent(s)	Votes	Pct	Ballots cast	Majority	Turnout
1990	P155 Santubong	Rohani Abdul Karim (PBB)	10,200	78.27%	Wan Zainal Abidin Wan Sanusi (PERMAS)	2,832	21.73%	13,256	7,368	70.66%
1995	P167 Santubong	Rohani Abdul Karim (PBB)	11,702	86.73%	Paruwadi Musa (IND)	1,791	13.27%	14,060	9,911	64.16%
1999	P167 Santubong	Rohani Abdul Karim (PBB)	7,955	56.76%	Hussaini Hamdan (keADILan)	6,060	43.24%	14,225	1,895	67.55%
2004	P201 Batang Lupar	Rohani Abdul Karim (PBB)	Unopposed							
2008	P201 Batang Lupar	Rohani Abdul Karim (PBB)	11,015	77.64%	Abang Eddy Allyanni (PAS)	2,923	20.60%	14,393	8,092	64.21%
2008	P201 Batang Lupar	Rohani Abdul Karim (PBB)	11,015	77.64%	Ali Semsu (IND)	250	1.76%	14,393	8,092	64.21%
2013	P201 Batang Lupar	Rohani Abdul Karim (PBB)	15,625	77.02%	Abang Zulkifli bin Abang Engkeh (PKR)	4,661	22.98%	20,754	10,964	75.86%
2018	P201 Batang Lupar	Rohani Abdul Karim (PBB)	14,204	70.49%	Wan Abdillah Wan Ahmad (PAS)	3,927	19.49%	20,603	10,277	69.11%
2018	P201 Batang Lupar	Rohani Abdul Karim (PBB)	14,204	70.49%	Narudin Mentali (AMANAH)	2,020	10.02%	20,603	10,277	69.11%

== Honours ==
- Malaysia
  - Recipient of the National Sovereignty Medal (PKN) (2014)
- Pahang
  - Knight Grand Companion of the Order of Sultan Ahmad Shah of Pahang (SSAP) – Dato' Sri (2013)
- Sarawak
  - Knight Commander of the Order of the Star of Sarawak (PNBS) – Dato Sri (2017)
  - Commander of the Order of the Star of Hornbill Sarawak (PGBK) – Datuk (2002)
  - Gold Medal of the Sarawak Independence Diamond Jubilee Medal (2023)
