= Razaili Gapor =

Malaysian politician

Yang Berhormat Dato Razaili Gapor PSBS PBS AMN MLA

Member of the Sarawak State Legislative Assembly for Beting Maro
- Incumbent
- Assumed office 16 April 2011
- Preceded by: Bolhassan Di @ Ahmad Di (BN–PBB)
- Majority: 391 (2011); 1,707 (2016); 1,711 (2021)

Personal details
- Born: 5 January 1956 (age 70) Crown Colony of Sarawak
- Party: Parti Pesaka Bumiputera Bersatu (PBB)
- Other political affiliations: Barisan Nasional (BN) (−2018); Gabungan Parti Sarawak (GPS) (2018–present)
- Occupation: Politician
- Website: razailigapor.com

Razaili bin Gapor is a Malaysian politician based in the state of Sarawak from the Parti Pesaka Bumiputera Bersatu (PBB), a major component party of the ruling Gabungan Parti Sarawak (GPS) coalition of the state. He has also served as the Member of the Sarawak State Legislative Assembly (MLA) for Beting Maro since April 2011.

Razaili Gapor was reappointed State Sarawak PAC chairman on 18 May 2023.

== Election results ==
Sarawak State Legislative Assembly
Year	Constituency	Candidate	Votes	Pct	Opponent(s)	Votes	Pct	Ballots cast	Majority	Turnout
2011	N24 Beting Maro	Razaili Gapor (PBB)	3,069	53.40%	Abang Ahmad Kerdee Abang Masagus (PAS)	2,678	46.60%	5,808	391	73.82%
2016	N29 Beting Maro	Razaili Gapor (PBB)	4,758	60.14%	Hamidah Mokhtar (PAS)	3,051	38.56%	8,035	1,707	76.71%
2016	N29 Beting Maro	Razaili Gapor (PBB)	4,758	60.14%	Andri Zulkarnaen Hamden (AMANAH)	103	1.30%	8,035	1,707	76.71%
2021	N29 Beting Maro	Razaili Gapor (PBB)	3,769	51.62%	Arif Paijo (PAS)	2,058	28.18%	7,516	1,711	67.75%
2021	N29 Beting Maro	Razaili Gapor (PBB)	3,769	51.62%	Abang Zulkifli Abang Engkeh (PKR)	765	10.48%	7,516	1,711	67.75%
2021	N29 Beting Maro	Razaili Gapor (PBB)	3,769	51.62%	Saifudin Matsah (IND)	636	8.71%	7,516	1,711	67.75%
2021	N29 Beting Maro	Razaili Gapor (PBB)	3,769	51.62%	Jacky Chiew Su Chee (PBK)	74	1.01%	7,516	1,711	67.75%

== Honours ==
- Malaysia
  - Member of the Order of the Defender of the Realm (AMN) (2014)
- Sarawak
  - Commander of the Most Exalted Order of the Star of Sarawak (PSBS) – Dato (2025)
  - Officer of the Most Exalted Order of the Star of Sarawak (PBS) (2016)

== See also ==
- Beting Maro (state constituency)
