= Beting Maro =

State constituency in Sarawak, Malaysia

Beting Maro (N29)
Sarawak constituency

State constituency
- Legislature: Sarawak State Legislative Assembly
MLA
Vacant
- Constituency created: 1996
- First contested: 1996
- Last contested: 2026

Beting Maro is a state constituency in Sarawak, Malaysia, that has been represented in the Sarawak State Legislative Assembly since 1996.

The state constituency was created in the 1996 redistribution and is mandated to return a single member to the Sarawak State Legislative Assembly under the first past the post voting system.

== Demographics ==
Ethnic breakdown of Beting Maro's electorate as of 2022
1. Malay-Muslim bumiputera (90.4%)
2. Sarawak bumiputera (7.40%)
3. Chinese (1.70%)
4. Other ethnicities (0.50%)

== History ==
As of 2020, Beting Maro has a population of 15,769 people.

=== Polling districts ===
According to the gazette issued on 31 October 2022, the Beting Maro constituency has a total of 3 polling districts.

State constituency	Polling Districts	Code	Location
Beting Maro (N29)	Beladin	201/29/01	SK Batang Maro; SK Sepinang; SMK Beladin; SK Semarang
Beting Maro (N29)	Undai	201/29/02	SK Tambak; RH Duat Anak Aji Blok Debak; SK Mutun; SJK (C) Chung Hua Pusa
Beting Maro (N29)	Pusa	201/29/03	SK Pusa

=== Representation history ===
Members of the Legislative Assembly for Beting Maro
Assembly	No	Years	Member	Party
Constituency created, renamed from Beladin
14th	N21	1996-2001	Bolhassan Di @ Ahmad Di	BN (PBB)
15th	N21	2001-2006	Bolhassan Di @ Ahmad Di	BN (PBB)
16th	N24	2006-2011	Bolhassan Di @ Ahmad Di	BN (PBB)
17th	N24	2011-2016	Razaili Gapor	BN (PBB)
18th	N29	2016-2018	Razaili Gapor	BN (PBB)
18th	N29	2018-2021	Razaili Gapor	GPS (PBB)
19th	N29	2021–2026	Razaili Gapor	GPS (PBB)

== Election results ==
Sarawak state election, 2026: Beting Maro
Party	Candidate	Votes	%	∆%
GPS				▲
PH				▲
PH				▲
Total valid votes				
Total rejected ballots				
Unreturned ballots				
Turnout				
Registered electors				
Majority				

Sarawak state election, 2021: Beting Maro
Party	Candidate	Votes	%	∆%
GPS	Razaili Gapor	3,769	51.62	▲51.62
PAS	Arif Paijo	2,058	28.18	▼10.38
PKR	Abang Zulkifli Abang Engkeh	765	10.48	▲10.48
Independent	Saifudin Matsah	636	8.71	▲8.71
PBK	Jacky Chiew Su Chee	74	1.01	▲1.01
Total valid votes		7,302	100.00	
Total rejected ballots		201		
Unreturned ballots		13		
Turnout		7,516	67.75	▼8.96
Registered electors		11,094		
Majority		1,711	23.43	▲1.85
GPS gain from BN		Swing		?
Source(s) https://lom.agc.gov.my/ilims/upload/portal/akta/outputp/1718688/PUB687.pdf

Sarawak state election, 2016: Beting Maro
Party	Candidate	Votes	%	∆%
BN	Razaili Gapor	4,758	60.14	▲6.74
PAS	Hamidah Mokhtar	3,051	38.56	▼8.04
Amanah	Andri Zulkarnaen Hamden	103	1.30	▲1.30
Total valid votes		7,912	100.00	
Total rejected ballots		104		
Unreturned ballots		19		
Turnout		8,035	76.71	▲2.89
Registered electors		10,474		
Majority		1,707	21.57	▲14.77
BN hold		Swing		
Source(s) "Federal Government Gazette - Notice of Contested Election, State Legislative Assembly of the State of Sarawak [P.U. (B) 190/2016]" (PDF). Attorney General's Chambers of Malaysia. 25 April 2016. Archived from the original (PDF) on 12 June 2017. "Senarai Calon yang Disahkan Layak Bertanding Pilihan Raya Dewan Undangan Negeri ke-11". Election Commission of Malaysia. 25 April 2016. Archived from the original on 25 April 2016.

Sarawak state election, 2011: Beting Maro
Party	Candidate	Votes	%	∆%
BN	Razaili Gapor	3,069	53.40	▼6.13
PAS	Abang Ahmad Kerdee Abang Masagus	2,678	46.60	▲6.13
Total valid votes		5,747	100.00	
Total rejected ballots		61		
Unreturned ballots		0		
Turnout		5,808	73.82	▲8.53
Registered electors		7,868		
Majority		391	6.80	▼12.25
BN hold		Swing		
Source(s) "Federal Government Gazette - Results of Contested Election and Statements of the Poll after the Official Addition of Votes Sarawak [P.U. (B) 245/2011]" (PDF). Attorney General's Chambers of Malaysia. 29 April 2011.

Sarawak state election, 2006: Beting Maro
Party	Candidate	Votes	%	∆%
BN	Bolhassan Di @ Ahmad Di	2,796	59.53	▼15.80
PAS	Alem Din	1,901	40.47	▲16.70
Total valid votes		4,697	100.00	
Total rejected ballots		45		
Unreturned ballots		3		
Turnout		4,745	65.29	▼4.91
Registered electors		7,267		
Majority		895	19.05	▼32.51
BN hold		Swing		

Sarawak state election, 2001: Beting Maro
Party	Candidate	Votes	%	∆%
BN	Bolhassan Di @ Ahmad Di	4,433	75.33	▲4.06
PAS	Abang Was	1,399	23.77	▲23.77
Independent	Mohtada Dol	53	0.90	▲0.90
Total valid votes		5,885	100.00	
Total rejected ballots		47		
Unreturned ballots		92		
Turnout		6,024	69.63	▲5.48
Registered electors		8,651		
Majority		3,034	51.55	▲9.00
BN hold		Swing		

Sarawak state election, 1996: Beting Maro
Party	Candidate	Votes	%
BN	Bolhassan Di @ Ahmad Di	3,736	71.27
Independent	Ali Husain Sain	1,506	28.73
Total valid votes		5,242	100.00
Total rejected ballots		130	
Unreturned ballots		4	
Turnout		5,376	64.15
Registered electors		8,380	
Majority		2,230	42.54
This was a new constituency created.
