= Teraju =

Teraju, officially the Unit Peneraju Agenda Bumiputera, is a Malaysian government initiative. It was established as a strategic unit under the Prime Minister's Department on February 8, 2011, with the aim of increasing Bumiputera participation in the economy of the country.

A new Bumiputera initiative, the Bumiputera Economic Transformation Roadmap, was announced in 2017.
