= Minister of Federal Territories (Malaysia) =

- Ministry of Federal Territories
- Style: Yang Berhormat Menteri (The Honourable Minister)
- Member of: Cabinet of Malaysia
- Reports to: Prime Minister
- Seat: Putrajaya
- Appointer: Yang di-Pertuan Agong on the recommendation of the Prime Minister of Malaysia
- Formation: 1976
- First holder: Hassan Adli Arshad as Minister of Local Government and Federal Territories
- Final holder: Shahidan Kassim
- Succession: Minister in the Prime Minister's Department

The Minister of Federal Territories administered the portfolio through the Ministry of Federal Territories until its restructuring into a department under the Prime Minister's Department in 2022. It was previously folded into the Prime Minister's Department in 1987 before being restored in 2004.

The minister was responsible for the supervision of the local authorities of the federal territories of Kuala Lumpur (Dewan Bandaraya Kuala Lumpur), Putrajaya (Putrajaya Corporation), and Labuan (Labuan Corporation). Agencies such as the Federal Territories Lands and Mines Office and the Federal Territories Sports Council also fell under the position's purview before its disestablishment.

== List of ministers of federal territories ==
The following individuals have been appointed as Minister of Federal Territories, or any of its precedent titles:

Political Party: BN PH

Portrait	Name (Birth–Death) Constituency	Political Party	Title	Took Office	Left Office	Prime Minister (Cabinet)
	Hassan Adli Arshad (1929-1987); MP for Bagan Datok	BN (UMNO)	Minister of Local Government and Federal Territories	1976	1978	Hussein Onn (I)
	Hussein Onn (1922-1990); MP for Sri Gading	BN (UMNO)	Minister of Federal Territories	1978	1980	Hussein Onn (II)
	Abdul Taib Mahmud (b. 1936); MP for Samarahan	BN (PBB)	Minister of Federal Territories	1980	9 March 1981	Hussein Onn (II)
	Sulaiman Daud (1933-2010); MP for Santubong	BN (PBB)	Minister of Federal Territories	9 March 1981	17 July 1981	Hussein Onn (II)
	Mohd Isa Abdul Samad (b. 1949); MP for Jempol	BN (UMNO)	Minister of Federal Territories	27 March 2004	16 October 2005	Abdullah Ahmad Badawi (II)
	Shahrizat Abdul Jalil (b. 1953); MP for Lembah Pantai; Acting	BN (UMNO)	Minister of Federal Territories	16 October 2005	14 February 2006	Abdullah Ahmad Badawi (II)
	Zulhasnan Rafique (b. 1954); MP for Setiawangsa	BN (UMNO)	Minister of Federal Territories	14 February 2006	9 April 2009	Abdullah Ahmad Badawi (II • III)
	Raja Nong Chik Zainal Abidin (b. 1953); Senator	BN (UMNO)	Minister of Federal Territories and Urban Wellbeing	10 April 2009	16 May 2013	Najib Razak (I)
	Tengku Adnan Tengku Mansor (b. 1950); MP for Putrajaya	BN (UMNO)	Minister of Federal Territories	16 May 2013	9 May 2018	Najib Razak (II)
	Khalid Abdul Samad (b. 1957); MP for Shah Alam	PH (AMANAH)	Minister of Federal Territories	2 July 2018	24 February 2020	Mahathir Mohamad (VII)
	Annuar Musa (b. 1956); MP for Ketereh	BN (UMNO)	Minister of Federal Territories	10 March 2020	16 August 2021	Muhyiddin Yassin (I)
	Shahidan Kassim (b. 1951); MP for Arau	BN (UMNO)	Minister of Federal Territories	30 August 2021	24 November 2022	Ismail Sabri Yaakob (I)
