= Minister of Housing and Local Government (Malaysia) =

Malaysian political office

- Menteri Perumahan dan Kerajaan Tempatan
- Incumbent; Nga Kor Ming since 3 December 2022
- Ministry of Housing and Local Government
- Style: Yang Berhormat Menteri (The Honourable Minister)
- Abbreviation: KPKT
- Member of: Cabinet of Malaysia
- Reports to: Parliament of Malaysia
- Seat: Putrajaya
- Appointer: Yang di-Pertuan Agong on the recommendation of the Prime Minister of Malaysia
- Formation: 1955
- First holder: Sulaiman Abdul Rahman as Minister of Local Government, Housing and Town Planning
- Deputy: Aiman Athirah Sabu
- Website: www.kpkt.gov.my

The Malaysian Minister of Housing and Local Government (Malay: Menteri Perumahan dan Kerajaan Tempatan; Jawi: منتري ڤرومهن دان كراجأن تمڤتن) is the leader of the Ministry of Housing and Local Government. Since 3 December 2022, this has been Nga Kor Ming. The minister is supported by Deputy Minister of Housing and Local Government, Aiman Athirah Sabu, since 12 December 2023.

== List of ministers ==
=== Local government/local government development ===
The following individuals have been appointed Minister of Local Government/Local Government Development, or any of its precedent titles:

Political party: Alliance/BN PH PN

Portrait	Name (Birth–Death) Constituency	Political party	Title	Took office	Left office	Deputy Minister	Prime Minister (Cabinet)
	Suleiman Abdul Rahman (1912–1963); MP for Johore Bahru	Alliance (UMNO)	Minister of Local Government, Housing and Town Planning	1955	1957	Vacant	Chief Minister of the Federation of Malaya; Tunku Abdul Rahman
	Khaw Kai Boh (1918–1972); MP for Ulu Selangor	Alliance (MCA)	Minister of Local Government and Housing	2 May 1964	3 June 1969	Vacant	Tunku Abdul Rahman (III)
	Ong Kee Hui (1914–2000); MP for Bandar Kuching	Alliance (SUPP)	Minister of Technology, Research and Local Government; Minister of Local Government and Housing; Minister of Local Government and Environment	9 February 1971	4 March 1976	Vacant	Abdul Razak Hussein (I • II); Hussein Onn (I)
	Michael Chen Wing Sum (1932-2024); MP for Ulu Selangor	Alliance (MCA)	Minister of Housing and Local Government	9 April 1974	1 November 1975	Vacant	Abdul Razak Hussein (I • II)
	Hassan Adli Arshad (1929-1987); MP for Bagan Datoh	BN (UMNO)	Minister of Local Government and Federal Territories	5 March 1976	27 July 1978	Subramaniam Sinniah	Hussein Onn (I)
	Neo Yee Pan (1938-2020); MP for Muar	BN (MCA)	Minister of Housing and Local Government	15 September 1979	15 August 1985	Ramli Omar (1979–1980); Zakaria Abdul Rahman (1980–1981); Abdul Jalal Abu Bakar (1981–1982); Napsiah Omar (1981–1982); Subramaniam Sinniah (1981–1982)	Hussein Onn (II); Mahathir Mohamad (I • II)
	Chan Siang Sun (1933-1989); MP for Bentong	BN (MCA)	Minister of Housing and Local Government	7 January 1986	10 August 1986	Napsiah Omar; Subramaniam Sinniah	Mahathir Mohamad (II)
	Abdul Ghafar Baba (1925–2006) (Deputy Prime Minister); MP for Jasin; Acting	BN (UMNO)	Acting Minister of Housing and Local Government	11 August 1986	27 October 1986	Napsiah Omar; Subramaniam Sinniah	Mahathir Mohamad (III)
	Ng Cheng Kiat (b. unknown); MP for Klang	BN (MCA)	Minister of Housing and Local Government	27 October 1986	13 June 1989	Napsiah Omar (1986–1987); Subramaniam Sinniah (1986–1989); Hussein Ahmad (1987–1989); Subramaniam Sinniah (1981–1982)	Mahathir Mohamad (III)
	Lee Kim Sai (1937-2019); MP for Hulu Langat	BN (MCA)	Minister of Housing and Local Government	14 August 1989	26 October 1990	Hussein Ahmad; Osu Sukam	Mahathir Mohamad (III)
	Ting Chew Peh (b. 1943); MP for Gopeng	BN (MCA)	Minister of Housing and Local Government	27 October 1990	14 December 1999	Daud Taha (1990–1995); Osu Sukam (1990–1994); Jeffrey Kitingan (1994–1995); Tajol Rosli Mohd Ghazali (1995–1999); Peter Chin Fah Kui (1995–1999); Shafie Apdal (1999)	Mahathir Mohamad (IV • V)
	Ong Ka Ting (b. 1956); MP for Pontian (1999-2004); MP for Tanjong Piai (2004-2008)	BN (MCA)	Minister of Housing and Local Government	15 December 1999	17 March 2008	Peter Chin Fah Kui (1999–2004); Douglas Uggah Embas (2001–2003); Azizah Mohd Dun (2004–2008); Robert Lau Hoi Chew (2004–2008)	Mahathir Mohamad (VI); Abdullah Ahmad Badawi (I • II)
	Ong Ka Chuan (b. 1954); MP for Tanjong Malim	BN (MCA)	Minister of Housing and Local Government	18 March 2008	9 April 2009	Hamzah Zainudin (2008–2009); Robert Lau Hoi Chew (2008–2009)	Abdullah Ahmad Badawi (III)
	Kong Cho Ha (b. 1950); MP for Lumut	BN (MCA)	Minister of Housing and Local Government	10 April 2009	4 June 2010	Lajim Ukin	Najib Razak (I)
	Chor Chee Heung (b. 1955); MP for Alor Setar	BN (MCA)	Minister of Housing and Local Government	7 June 2010	5 May 2013	Lajim Ukin (2010–2012); Vacant (2012–2013)	Najib Razak (I)
	Abdul Rahman Dahlan (b. 1965); MP for Kota Belud	BN (UMNO)	Minister of Urban Wellbeing, Housing and Local Government	16 May 2013	27 June 2016	Halimah Mohd Sadique	Najib Razak (II)
	Noh Omar (b. 1958); MP for Tanjong Karang	BN (UMNO)	Minister of Urban Wellbeing, Housing and Local Government	27 June 2016	9 May 2018	Halimah Mohd Sadique	Najib Razak (II)
	Zuraida Kamaruddin (b. 1958); MP for Ampang	PH (PKR)	Minister of Housing and Local Government	21 May 2018	24 February 2020	Raja Kamarul Bahrin	Mahathir Mohamad (VII)
	Zuraida Kamaruddin (b. 1958); MP for Ampang	PN (BERSATU)	Minister of Housing and Local Government	10 March 2020	16 August 2021	Ismail Muttalib	Muhyiddin Yassin (I)
	Reezal Merican Naina Merican (b.1972); MP for Kepala Batas	BN (UMNO)	Minister of Housing and Local Government	30 August 2021	24 November 2022	Ismail Muttalib	Ismail Sabri Yaakob (I)
	Nga Kor Ming (b.1972); MP for Teluk Intan	PH (DAP)	Minister of Local Government Development	3 December 2022	13 December 2023	Akmal Nasrullah Mohd Nasir	Anwar Ibrahim (I)
	Nga Kor Ming (b.1972); MP for Teluk Intan	PH (DAP)	Minister of Housing and Local Government	13 December 2023	Incumbent	Aiman Athirah Sabu	Anwar Ibrahim (I)

=== Town planning ===
The following individuals have been appointed Minister of Town Planning, or any of its precedent titles:

Political party: Alliance/BN

Portrait	Name (Birth–Death) Constituency	Political party	Title	Took office	Left office	Deputy Minister	Prime Minister (Cabinet)
	Suleiman Abdul Rahman (1912–1963); MP for Johore Bahru	Alliance (UMNO)	Minister of Local Government, Housing and Town Planning	1955	1957	Vacant	Chief Minister of the Federation of Malaya; Tunku Abdul Rahman

=== Housing ===
The following individuals have been appointed Minister of Housing, or any of its precedent titles:

Political party: Alliance/BN PH PN

Portrait	Name (Birth–Death) Constituency	Political party	Title	Took office	Left office	Vacant	Prime Minister (Cabinet)
	Suleiman Abdul Rahman (1912–1963); MP for Johore Bahru	Alliance (UMNO)	Minister of Local Government, Housing and Town Planning	1955	1957	Vacant	Chief Minister of the Federation of Malaya; Tunku Abdul Rahman
	Khaw Kai Boh (1918–1972); MP for Ulu Selangor	Alliance (MCA)	Minister of Local Government and Housing	2 May 1964	3 June 1969	Vacant	Tunku Abdul Rahman (III)
	Ong Kee Hui (1914–2000); MP for Bandar Kuching	Alliance (SUPP)	Minister of Local Government and Housing	9 February 1971	1974	Vacant	Abdul Razak Hussein (I)
	Michael Chen Wing Sum (1932-2024); MP for Ulu Selangor	Alliance (MCA)	Minister of Housing and New Villages; Minister of Housing and Villages Development; Minister of Housing and Local Government	9 April 1974	1979	Vacant	Abdul Razak Hussein (I • II); Hussein Onn (I • II)
	Neo Yee Pan (1938–2020); MP for Muar	BN (MCA)	Minister of Housing and Local Government	15 September 1979	15 August 1985	Ramli Omar (1979–1980); Zakaria Abdul Rahman (1980–1981); Abdul Jalal Abu Bakar (1981–1982); Napsiah Omar (1981–1982); Subramaniam Sinniah (1981–1982)	Hussein Onn (II); Mahathir Mohamad (I • II)
	Chan Siang Sun (1933-1989); MP for Bentong	BN (MCA)	Minister of Housing and Local Government	7 January 1986	10 August 1986	Napsiah Omar; Subramaniam Sinniah	Mahathir Mohamad (II)
	Abdul Ghafar Baba (1925–2006) (Deputy Prime Minister); MP for Jasin; Acting	BN (UMNO)	Acting Minister of Housing and Local Government	11 August 1986	27 October 1986	Napsiah Omar; Subramaniam Sinniah	Mahathir Mohamad (III)
	Ng Cheng Kiat (b. unknown); MP for Klang	BN (MCA)	Minister of Housing and Local Government	27 October 1986	13 June 1989	Napsiah Omar (1986–1987); Subramaniam Sinniah (1986–1989); Hussein Ahmad (1987–1989); Subramaniam Sinniah (1981–1982)	Mahathir Mohamad (III)
	Lee Kim Sai (1937–2019); MP for Hulu Langat	BN (MCA)	Minister of Housing and Local Government	14 August 1989	26 October 1990	Hussein Ahmad; Osu Sukam	Mahathir Mohamad (III)
	Ting Chew Peh (b. 1943); MP for Gopeng	BN (MCA)	Minister of Housing and Local Government	27 October 1990	14 December 1999	Daud Taha (1990–1995); Osu Sukam (1990–1994); Jeffrey Kitingan (1994–1995); Tajol Rosli Mohd Ghazali (1995–1999); Peter Chin Fah Kui (1995–1999); Shafie Apdal (1999)	Mahathir Mohamad (IV • V)
	Ong Ka Ting (b. 1956); MP for Pontian (1999-2004); MP for Tanjong Piai (2004-2008)	BN (MCA)	Minister of Housing and Local Government	15 December 1999	17 March 2008	Peter Chin Fah Kui (1999–2004); Douglas Uggah Embas (2001–2003); Azizah Mohd Dun (2004–2008); Robert Lau Hoi Chew (2004–2008)	Mahathir Mohamad (VI); Abdullah Ahmad Badawi (I • II)
	Ong Ka Chuan (b. 1954); MP for Tanjong Malim	BN (MCA)	Minister of Housing and Local Government	18 March 2008	9 April 2009	Hamzah Zainudin (2008–2009); Robert Lau Hoi Chew (2008–2009)	Abdullah Ahmad Badawi (III)
	Kong Cho Ha (b. 1950); MP for Lumut	BN (MCA)	Minister of Housing and Local Government	10 April 2009	4 June 2010	Lajim Ukin	Najib Razak (I)
	Chor Chee Heung (b. 1955); MP for Alor Setar	BN (MCA)	Minister of Housing and Local Government	7 June 2010	5 May 2013	Lajim Ukin (2010–2012); Vacant (2012–2013)	Najib Razak (I)
	Abdul Rahman Dahlan (b. 1965); MP for Kota Belud	BN (UMNO)	Minister of Urban Wellbeing, Housing and Local Government	16 May 2013	27 June 2016	Halimah Mohd Sadique	Najib Razak (II)
	Noh Omar (b. 1958); MP for Tanjong Karang	BN (UMNO)	Minister of Urban Wellbeing, Housing and Local Government	27 June 2016	9 May 2018	Halimah Mohd Sadique	Najib Razak (II)
	Zuraida Kamaruddin (b. 1958); MP for Ampang	PH (PKR)	Minister of Housing and Local Government	21 May 2018	24 February 2020	Raja Kamarul Bahrin	Mahathir Mohamad (VII)
	Zuraida Kamaruddin (b. 1958); MP for Ampang	PN (BERSATU)	Minister of Housing and Local Government	10 March 2020	16 August 2021	Ismail Muttalib	Muhyiddin Yassin (I)
	Reezal Merican Naina Merican (b.1972); MP for Kepala Batas	BN (UMNO)	Minister of Housing and Local Government	30 August 2021	24 November 2022	Ismail Muttalib	Ismail Sabri Yaakob (I)
	Nga Kor Ming (b.1972); MP for Teluk Intan	PH (DAP)	Minister of Housing and Local Government	13 December 2023	Incumbent	Aiman Athirah Sabu	Anwar Ibrahim (I)

=== Federal territories ===
The following individuals have been appointed Minister of Federal Territories, or any of its precedent titles:

Political party: BN PH

Portrait	Name (Birth–Death) Constituency	Political party	Title	Took office	Left office	Deputy Minister	Prime Minister (Cabinet)
	Hassan Adli Arshad (1929-1987); MP for Bagan Datok	BN (UMNO)	Minister of Local Government and Federal Territories	1976	1978	Subramaniam Sinniah	Hussein Onn (I)
	Hussein Onn (1922-1990); MP for Sri Gading	BN (UMNO)	Minister of Federal Territories	1978	1980	Abdullah Ahmad Badawi	Hussein Onn (II)
	Abdul Taib Mahmud (1936-2024); MP for Samarahan	BN (PBB)	Minister of Federal Territories	1980	9 March 1981	Abdullah Ahmad Badawi	Hussein Onn (II)
	Sulaiman Daud (1933-2010); MP for Santubong	BN (PBB)	Minister of Federal Territories	9 March 1981	17 July 1981	Vacant	Hussein Onn (II)
	Pengiran Othman Pengiran Rauf (1940-2017); MP for Kimanis	BN (BERJAYA)	Minister of Federal Territories	17 July 1981	2 June 1983	Idris Abdul Rauf	Mahathir (I • II)
	Shahrir Abdul Samad (b. 1949); MP for Johor Bahru	BN (UMNO)	Minister of Federal Territories	2 June 1983	10 August 1986	Muhyiddin Yassin	Mahathir (II)
	Abu Hassan Omar (1940-2018); MP for Kuala Selangor	BN (UMNO)	Minister of Federal Territories	11 August 1986	20 May 1987	Ahmad Shah Hussein Tambakau	Mahathir (III)
	Mohd Isa Abdul Samad (b. 1949); MP for Jempol	BN (UMNO)	Minister of Federal Territories	27 March 2004	16 October 2005	Zulhasnan Rafique	Abdullah Ahmad Badawi (II)
	Shahrizat Abdul Jalil (b. 1953); MP for Lembah Pantai; Acting	BN (UMNO)	Acting Minister of Federal Territories	16 October 2005	14 February 2006	Zulhasnan Rafique	Abdullah Ahmad Badawi (II)
	Zulhasnan Rafique (b. 1954); MP for Setiawangsa	BN (UMNO)	Minister of Federal Territories	14 February 2006	9 April 2009	Abu Seman Yusop	Abdullah Ahmad Badawi (II • III)
	Raja Nong Chik Zainal Abidin (b. 1953); Senator	BN (UMNO)	Minister of Federal Territories and Urban Wellbeing	10 April 2009	16 May 2013	Saravanan Murugan	Najib Razak (I)
	Tengku Adnan Tengku Mansor (b. 1950); MP for Putrajaya	BN (UMNO)	Minister of Federal Territories	16 May 2013	9 May 2018	Loga Bala Mohan Jaganathan	Najib Razak (II)
	Khalid Abdul Samad (b. 1957); MP for Shah Alam	PH (AMANAH)	Minister of Federal Territories	2 July 2018	24 February 2020	Shahruddin Md Salleh	Mahathir Mohamad (VII)
	Annuar Musa (b. 1956); MP for Ketereh	BN (UMNO)	Minister of Federal Territories	10 March 2020	16 August 2021	Edmund Santhara Kumar Ramanaidu	Muhyiddin Yassin (I)
	Shahidan Kassim (b. 1951); MP for Arau	BN (UMNO)	Minister of Federal Territories	30 August 2021	24 November 2022	Jalaluddin Alias	Ismail Sabri Yaakob (I)

=== New villages ===
The following individuals have been appointed Minister of New Villages, or any of its precedent titles:

Political party: Alliance/BN

Portrait	Name (Birth–Death) Constituency	Political party	Title	Took office	Left office	Deputy Minister	Prime Minister (Cabinet)
	Lee San Choon (1935–2023); MP for Segamat Selatan	Alliance (MCA)	Minister of Technology, Research and Coordination of New Villages	1972	1974	Vacant	Abdul Razak Hussein (I)
	Michael Chen Wing Sum (1932-2024); MP for Ulu Selangor	Alliance (MCA)	Minister of Housing and New Villages; Minister of Housing and Villages Development; Minister of Housing and Local Government	9 April 1974	1979	Vacant (1974–1976); Ramli Omar (1976–1979)	Abdul Razak Hussein (I • II); Hussein Onn (I · II)

=== Prime Minister's Department (Federal Territories) ===
Political party: PH

Portrait	Name (Birth–Death) Constituency	Political party	Responsible for	Took office	Left office	Deputy Minister	Prime Minister (Cabinet)
	Zaliha Mustafa (b. 1964); MP for Sekijang	PH (PKR)	Federal Territories	12 December 2023	17 December 2025	Vacant	Anwar Ibrahim (I)
	Hannah Yeoh Tseow Suan (b.1979); MP for Segambut	PH (DAP)	Federal Territories	17 December 2025	Incumbent	Lo Su Fui	Anwar Ibrahim (I)

=== Urban wellbeing ===
The following individuals have been appointed Minister of Urban Wellbeing, or any of its precedent titles:

Political party: BN

Portrait	Name (Birth–Death) Constituency	Political party	Title	Took office	Left office	Deputy Minister	Prime Minister (Cabinet)
	Raja Nong Chik Zainal Abidin (b. 1953); Senator	BN (UMNO)	Minister of Federal Territories and Urban Wellbeing	10 April 2009	16 May 2013	Saravanan Murugan	Najib Razak (I)
	Abdul Rahman Dahlan (b. 1965); MP for Kota Belud	BN (UMNO)	Minister of Urban Wellbeing, Housing and Local Government	16 May 2013	27 June 2016	Halimah Mohd Sadique	Najib Razak (II)
	Noh Omar (b. 1958); MP for Tanjong Karang	BN (UMNO)	Minister of Urban Wellbeing, Housing and Local Government	27 June 2016	9 May 2018	Halimah Mohd Sadique	Najib Razak (II)
