= Putrajaya (disambiguation) =

Putrajaya may refer to:

- Putrajaya, administrative capital of Malaysia
- Putrajaya (federal constituency), represented in the Dewan Rakyat

Other:

- Phú Thượng, ward of Hanoi.
- Vijayapura, mandala of Champa.

== See also ==
- Petra Jaya (disambiguation)
