= Radzi Jidin =

Malaysian politician

Yang Berhormat Datuk Dr. Mohd Radzi Md Jidin PMW MP
- محمد راضي محمد جيدين
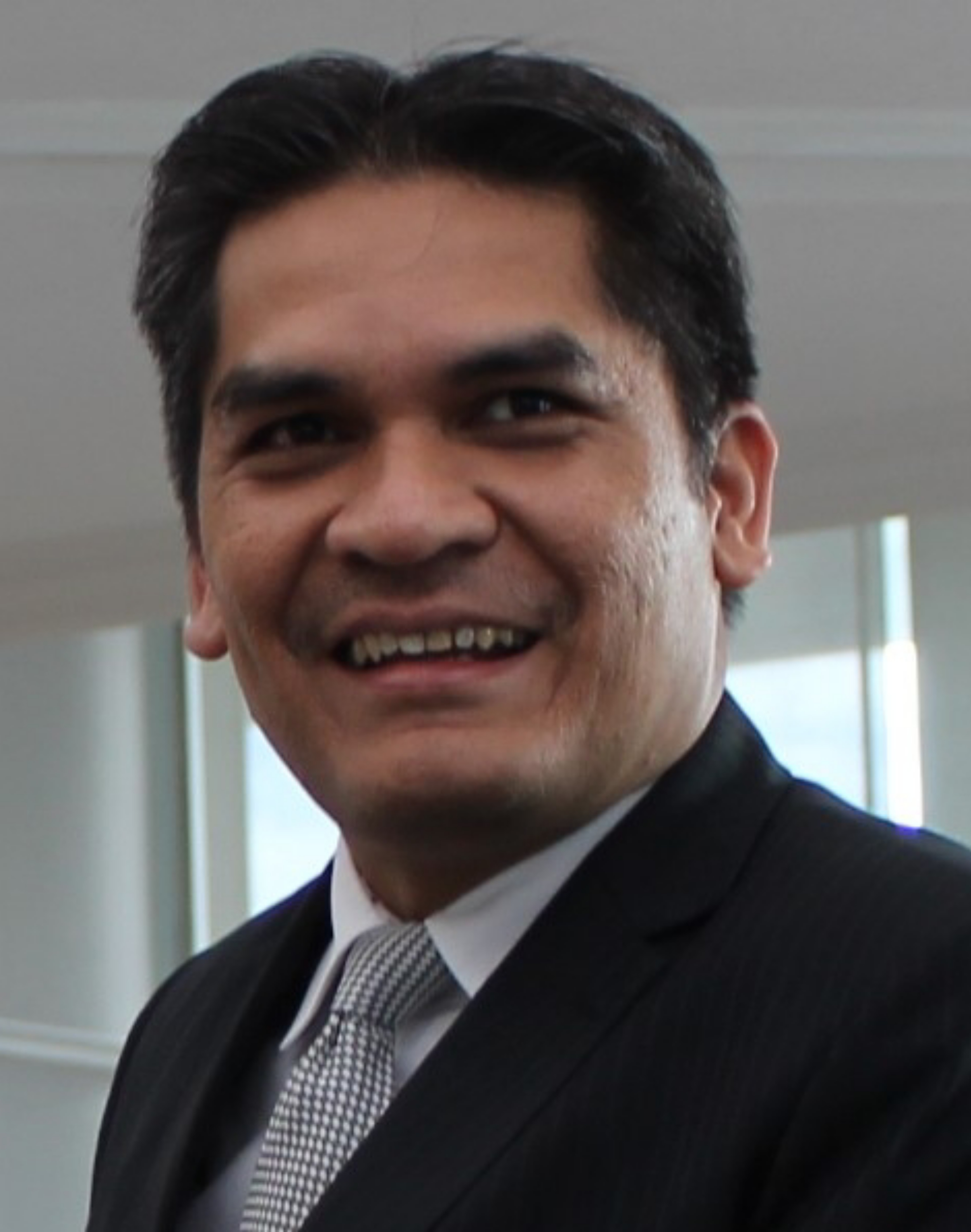
- Mohd Radzi in 2020

Senior Minister of Education Cluster
- In office 30 August 2021 – 24 November 2022
- Prime Minister: Ismail Sabri Yaakob
- Preceded by: Himself (Senior Minister of Education and Social Cluster)
- Succeeded by: Position abolished
- Constituency: Senator

Senior Minister of Education and Social Cluster
- In office 10 March 2020 – 16 August 2021
- Prime Minister: Muhyiddin Yassin
- Preceded by: Position established
- Succeeded by: Himself (Senior Minister of Education Cluster)
- Constituency: Senator

Minister of Education
- In office 30 August 2021 – 24 November 2022
- Monarch: Abdullah
- Prime Minister: Ismail Sabri Yaakob
- Deputy: Mah Hang Soon; Mohamad Alamin
- Preceded by: Himself
- Succeeded by: Fadhlina Sidek
- Constituency: Senator
- In office 10 March 2020 – 16 August 2021
- Monarch: Abdullah
- Prime Minister: Muhyiddin Yassin
- Deputy: Mah Hang Soon; Muslimin Yahaya
- Preceded by: Maszlee Malik; Mahathir Mohamad (acting)
- Succeeded by: Himself
- Constituency: Senator

Deputy Minister of Economic Affairs
- In office 17 July 2018 – 24 February 2020
- Monarchs: Muhammad V (2018–2019); Abdullah (2019–2020)
- Prime Minister: Mahathir Mohamad
- Minister: Azmin Ali
- Preceded by: Devamany Krishnasamy (Deputy Minister in Prime Minister's Department (Economic Planning Unit))
- Succeeded by: Arthur Joseph Kurup (Deputy Minister in Prime Minister's Department (Economic Affairs))
- Constituency: Senator

Senator
- In office 17 July 2018 – 5 November 2022
- Monarchs: Muhammad V (2018–2019); Abdullah (2019–2022)
- Prime Minister: Mahathir Mohamad (2018–2020); Muhyiddin Yassin (2020–2021); Ismail Sabri Yaakob (2021–2022)
- Preceded by: Azizah Harun (BN–UMNO)

Vice President of the Malaysian United Indigenous Party
- Incumbent
- Assumed office 23 August 2020 Serving with Ronald Kiandee (2020–present) & Mohd Rafiq Naizamohideen (2020–2022) & Ahmad Faizal Azumu (2024–present)
- President: Muhyiddin Yassin
- Preceded by: Abdul Rashid Asari

3rd Information Chief of Perikatan Nasional
- Incumbent
- Assumed office April 2025
- Chairman: Muhyiddin Yassin
- Preceded by: Ahmad Faizal Azumu

2nd Information Chief of the Malaysian United Indigenous Party
- In office 27 September 2018 – 8 September 2020
- President: Muhyiddin Yassin
- Chairman: Mahathir Mohamad (2018–2020); Muhyiddin Yassin (2020)
- Preceded by: Kamarudin Md Nor
- Succeeded by: Wan Saiful Wan Jan

Member of the Malaysian Parliament for Putrajaya
- Incumbent
- Assumed office 19 November 2022
- Preceded by: Tengku Adnan Tengku Mansor (BN–UMNO)
- Majority: 2,310 (2022)

Faction represented in Dewan Rakyat
- 2022–: Perikatan Nasional

Faction represented in Dewan Negara
- 2018–2020: Pakatan Harapan
- 2020: Malaysian United Indigenous Party
- 2020–2022: Perikatan Nasional

Personal details
- Born: Mohd. Radzi bin Md. Jidin; 4 September 1977 (age 48) Ketereh, Kota Bharu, Kelantan, Malaysia
- Party: Malaysian United Indigenous Party (BERSATU) (2018–present); United Malays National Organisation (UMNO) (until 2018)
- Other political affiliations: Barisan Nasional (BN) (until 2018); Pakatan Harapan (PH) (2018–2020); Perikatan Nasional (PN) (2020–present)
- Education: Royal Military College
- Alma mater: La Trobe University (BCom); Universiti Utara Malaysia (MBA); Australian National University (PhD)
- Occupation: Politician
- Profession: Forensic accountant
- Website: Dr Radzi Jidin on Facebook

Mohd Radzi bin Md Jidin (Jawi: محمد راضي بن محمد جيدين; born 4 September 1977) is a Malaysian politician and forensic accountant who served as Senior Minister of the Education and Social Cluster and as Minister of Education from 2020 to 2022. He has been the Member of Parliament (MP) for Putrajaya since November 2022.

He was a Senator from 2018 to his resignation in 2022. He is a member of and has served as Vice-President of the Malaysian United Indigenous Party (BERSATU), a component party of Perikatan Nasional (PN), since 2020.

== Early life and education ==
Radzi was born on 4 September 1977 to a former headmaster in Ketereh, Kota Bharu, Kelantan, Malaysia. He received his secondary education at the Royal Military College (RMC). He then continued his studies for his Bachelor of Commerce (Accounting) in the La Trobe University. He also received his Master of Business Administration (MBA) from the Universiti Utara Malaysia (UUM) and Doctor of Philosophy (PhD) in Auditing from the Australian National University (ANU).

== Early career ==
Before joining politics, he was a lecturer in forensic accounting at University of Tasmania in Hobart, Australia.

== Political career ==
He contested in the 2018 general election for Ketereh federal seat in Kelantan against incumbent Annuar Musa from UMNO of BN and Wan Ismail Wan Jusoh from the Malaysian Islamic Party (PAS) but was defeated.

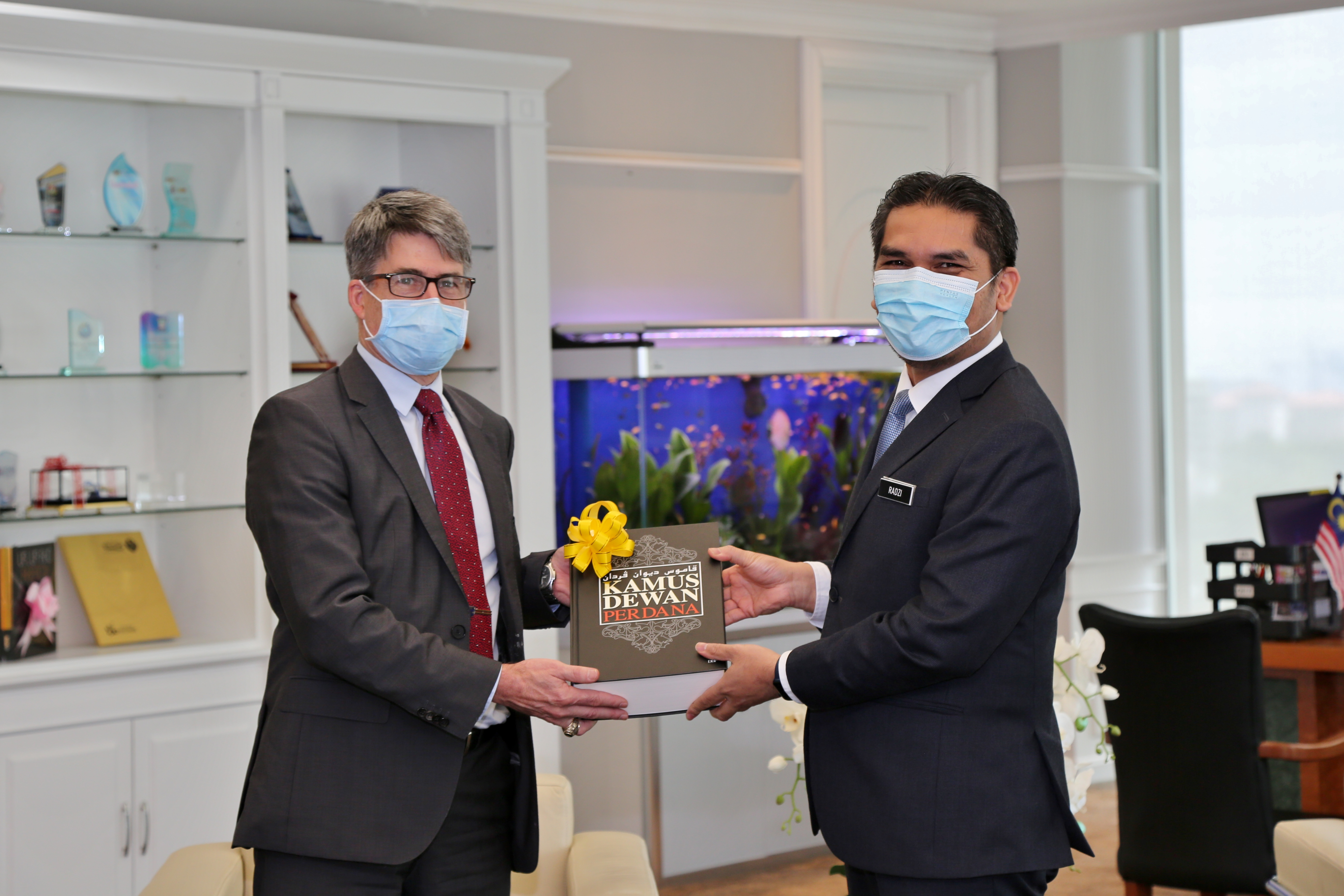
Mohd Radzi presenting the Kamus Dewan to Brian D. McFeeters, 21st United States Ambassador to Malaysia on 30 April 2021.

He served as the Deputy Minister of Economic Affairs in the Pakatan Harapan (PH) administration under former Prime Minister Mahathir Mohamad and former Minister Mohamed Azmin Ali from July 2018 to the collapse of the PH administration in February 2020. He is a member of the Malaysian United Indigenous Party (BERSATU), which is a component party of the opposition PN coalition. BERSATU was formerly a component party of the PH coalition prior to the 2020–2022 Malaysian political crisis. Before joining BERSATU, Radzi was a member of the United Malays National Organisation (UMNO), a component party of the Barisan Nasional (BN) coalition.

== Election results ==
Parliament of Malaysia
Year	Constituency	Candidate	Votes	Pct	Opponent(s)	Votes	Pct	Ballots cast	Majority	Turnout
2018	P026 Ketereh	Mohd Radzi Md Jidin (BERSATU)	6,799	12.80%	Annuar Musa (UMNO)	25,467	47.95%	53,888	4,625	82.60%
2018	P026 Ketereh	Mohd Radzi Md Jidin (BERSATU)	6,799	12.80%	Wan Ismail Wan Jusoh (PAS)	20,841	39.24%	53,888	4,625	82.60%
2022	P125 Putrajaya	Mohd Radzi Md Jidin (BERSATU)	16,002	43.67%	Tengku Adnan Tengku Mansor (UMNO)	13,692	37.37%	36,643	2,310	87.22%
2022	P125 Putrajaya	Mohd Radzi Md Jidin (BERSATU)	16,002	43.67%	Noraishah Mydin Abdul Aziz (PKR)	5,988	16.34%	36,643	2,310	87.22%
2022	P125 Putrajaya	Mohd Radzi Md Jidin (BERSATU)	16,002	43.67%	Rosli Ramli (PEJUANG)	878	2.40%	36,643	2,310	87.22%
2022	P125 Putrajaya	Mohd Radzi Md Jidin (BERSATU)	16,002	43.67%	Samsudin Mohamad Fauzi (IND)	63	0.17%	36,643	2,310	87.22%
2022	P125 Putrajaya	Mohd Radzi Md Jidin (BERSATU)	16,002	43.67%	Lim Fic Bee (IND)	20	0.05%	36,643	2,310	87.22%

== Honours ==
=== Honours of Malaysia ===
- Malaysia
  - Recipient of the 17th Yang di-Pertuan Agong Installation Medal (2024)
- Federal Territory (Malaysia)
  - Commander of the Order of the Territorial Crown (PMW) – Datuk (2021)
