= Tengku Adnan Tengku Mansor =

Malaysian politician

Yang Mulia Datuk Seri Utama Tengku Adnan Tengku Mansor PJN SJMK SSAP SIMP SPDK SUMW DGSM DSAP DIMP DMSM DSDK KMN
- تڠكو عدنان تڠكو منصور
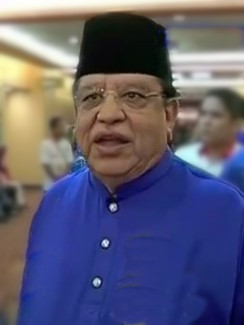
- Tengku Adnan in 2019

Minister of Federal Territories
- In office 16 May 2013 – 10 May 2018
- Monarchs: Abdul Halim (2013–2016); Muhammad V (2016–2018)
- Prime Minister: Najib Razak
- Deputy: Loga Bala Mohan Jaganathan
- Preceded by: Raja Nong Chik Zainal Abidin as Minister of Federal Territories and Urban Wellbeing
- Succeeded by: Khalid Abdul Samad
- Constituency: Putrajaya
- Majority: 2,300

Minister of Tourism
- In office 14 February 2006 – 18 March 2008
- Monarchs: Sirajuddin (14 February–12 December 2006); Mizan Zainal Abidin (2006–2008)
- Prime Minister: Abdullah Ahmad Badawi
- Deputy: Dorald Lim Siang Chai
- Preceded by: Leo Michael Toyad
- Succeeded by: Azalina Othman Said
- Constituency: Putrajaya

Minister in the Prime Minister's Department
- In office 21 November 2002 – 26 March 2004
- Monarch: Sirajuddin
- Prime Minister: Mahathir Mohamad (2002–2003); Abdullah Ahmad Badawi (2003–2004)
- Preceded by: Pandikar Amin Mulia
- Succeeded by: Mustapa Mohamed
- Constituency: Senator

Deputy Minister in the Prime Minister's Department
- In office 17 January 2001 – 21 November 2002
- Monarchs: Salahuddin (17 January–21 November 2001); Sirajuddin (2001–2002)
- Prime Minister: Mahathir Mohamad
- Minister: Pandikar Amin Mulia
- Preceded by: Shahrizat Abdul Jalil
- Succeeded by: M. Kayveas
- Constituency: Senator

Treasurer-General of the United Malays National Organisation
- Incumbent
- Assumed office 30 June 2018
- President: Ahmad Zahid Hamidi
- Preceded by: Salleh Said Keruak

Secretary-General of the United Malays National Organisation
- In office 26 March 2009 – 30 June 2018
- President: Najib Razak (2009–2018); Ahmad Zahid Hamidi (Acting, 11 May–30 June 2018)
- Preceded by: Mohd Radzi Sheikh Ahmad
- Succeeded by: Annuar Musa

Member of the Malaysian Parliament for Putrajaya
- In office 21 March 2004 – 19 November 2022
- Preceded by: Position established
- Succeeded by: Radzi Jidin (PN–BERSATU)
- Majority: 3,546 (2004); 2,734 (2008); 5,541 (2013); 3,372 (2018)

Senator Appointed by the Yang di-Pertuan Agong
- In office 13 December 2000 – 12 December 2003
- Monarchs: Salahuddin (2000–2001); Sirajuddin (2001–2003)
- Prime Minister: Mahathir Mohamad (2001–2003); Abdullah Ahmad Badawi (31 October–12 December 2003)

Faction represented in Dewan Rakyat
- 2004–2022: Barisan Nasional

Faction represented in Dewan Negara
- 2000–2003: Barisan Nasional

Personal details
- Born: Tengku Adnan bin Tengku Mansor; 20 December 1950 (age 75) Malacca, Federation of Malaya (now Malaysia)
- Party: United Malays National Organisation (UMNO) (1960–present)
- Other political affiliations: Barisan Nasional (BN)
- Spouse: Anggraini Sentiyaki
- Relations: Abdullah (Affinal); Tengku Muhammad Iskandar Ri'ayatuddin Shah (son-in-law)
- Children: 10
- Education: Universiti Teknologi MARA; University of Southern California (BBA)
- Occupation: Politician; business administrator

Tengku Adnan bin Tengku Mansor (Jawi: تڠكو عدنان بن تڠكو منصور; born 20 December 1950) is a Malaysian politician who served as Minister of Federal Territories, Minister of Tourism, Minister in the Prime Minister's Department and Deputy Minister in the Prime Minister's Department in the Barisan Nasional (BN) administration under former Prime Ministers Mahathir Mohamad, Abdullah Ahmad Badawi and Najib Razak and former Minister Pandikar Amin Mulia from January 2001 to the collapse of the BN administration in May 2018 as well as the Member of Parliament (MP) for Putrajaya from March 2004 to November 2022 and Senator from December 2000 to December 2003.

He is a member and the Division Chief of Putrajaya of the United Malays National Organisation (UMNO), a component party of the BN coalition. He has served as the Treasurer-General of UMNO since June 2018. He previously served as the Secretary-General of UMNO from March 2009 to June 2018.

In 2018, he was charged with corruption for allegedly accepting a bribe from a businessman, an allegation which he denied. He was convicted and sentenced to jail in 2020. However, the conviction was overturned on appeal in 2021.

== Early life, education and early career ==
Born in Malacca, Malaysia, Adnan obtained a Diploma in Business Administration from Mara Technology Institute (Malay: Institut Teknologi Mara, ITM), which is now known as Universiti Teknologi MARA (Malay: Universiti Teknologi Mara, UiTM), and a Bachelor of Business Administration (BBA) from the University of Southern California.

Adnan held important positions in the corporate sector, such as Director and Chairman of Far East Asset (FEA) and Chairman of UNZA Holdings Bhd.

== Political career ==
Adnan joined politics in the early 1980s. He became Treasurer of the UMNO Youth wing in 1988. He was elected to the UMNO Supreme Council in 1993 but lost the position in 1996. He was appointed as Federal Territory liaison chairman in June 2000. On 29 November 2001, he was appointed the Chairman of the Federal Territory Barisan Nasional. In 2003, he was appointed the Chief of Putrajaya UMNO, and later he won the position again uncontested in the party election in June 2004. In September 2004, he was successful in a bid for an UMNO Supreme Council seat.

Adnan won the Parliamentary seat of Putrajaya in the March 2004 general election by defeating Abdul Rahman Othman of Parti Keadilan Rakyat (KeADILan).

Adnan was appointed the Tourism Minister, replacing Datuk Dr. Leo Michael Toyad, on 14 February 2006. He was dropped from the cabinet following the March 2008 general election, where the ruling Barisan Nasional coalition received a serious drubbing at the polls.

After his victory for third time in 2013 general election, Adnan has returned to the cabinet and appointed Minister of the Federal Territories.

In the 2018 general election, Adnan was reelected to the Parliament. However, he lost his cabinet post as BN was relegated to opposition while the federal government was taken over by Pakatan Harapan (PH).

== Corruption case ==
On 15 November 2018, Tengku Adnan pleaded not guilty for accepting RM2 million from Aset Kayamas director Chai Kin Kong via cheque deposited to Tadmansori Holding which Tengku Adnan had interests in. He was allowed bail of RM1 million.

On 2 July 2019, the trial began. 23 witnesses called including Chai and former Kuala Lumpur City Hall mayors, Ahmad Phesal Talib and Mohd Amin Nordin.

On 17 July 2019, Chai took out RM2 million receipt from his wallet which he said is evidence of payment by Umno, to show the sum is for political donation. “Yes, it is in my pocket now” – he said when asked by lead counsel Tan Hock Chuan if he kept any such document.

On 14 October 2019, Tengku Adnan ordered by the High Court to enter his defence on the corruption charges against him.

On 17 January and 5 March 2020, Tengku Adnan’s defence proceedings were held for two days. He admitted receiving a RM2 million cheque from Chai for the expense of the Barisan Nasional election campaign on 14 June 2016. But, he did not report this to the party hierarchy as the money has nothing to do with Umno HQ.

On 30 June 2020, Tengku Adnan was the first defence witness and the defence closed its case after calling four witnesses.

On 21 December 2020, Judge Mohamed Zaini Mazlan said defence failed to challenge evidence brought by the prosecution. Tengku Adnan found guilty for receiving RM2 million of graft from Chai. He was sentenced to jail, fined RM2 million.

On 13 January 2021, Tengku Adnan was found guilty of a RM2 million graft charge towards the year-end, but was discharged on a charge involving RM1 million only a fortnight earlier.

On 25 January 2021, Tengku Adnan filed an appeal on 21 December last year against his conviction.

On 22 April 2021, the Court of Appeal is hearing an appeal by Tengku Adnan against his conviction for receiving RM2 million in kickbacks from Chai Kin Kong. Chai had testified that the funds were a political donation, but the High Court judge did not accept this. Tengku Adnan's counsel is arguing that the judge was wrong in not accepting Chai's testimony and that the receipt issued to the businessman for the funds shows that the payment was a political donation. The prosecution is arguing that the receipt was fabricated and that Chai was not impeached as a witness because he was recognised as biased towards Tengku Adnan. The court has adjourned to consider its decision.

On 22 April 2021, the judge overturned the conviction of Tengku Adnan on corruption charges. The original conviction was based on the testimony of Chai Kin Kong, who said that Adnan had received a RM2 million payment from him. However, the judge ruled that there was not enough evidence to prove that Adnan had actually received the money, and that the payment may have been for political donations instead.

== Controversies and issues ==
=== Lingam Videoclip controversy ===
Adnan was called to testify in front of a Royal Commission of Inquiry into the Lingam Video Clip investigating the allegation of illegal intervention in the appointment process of Malaysian judges that allegedly occurred in 2002. The formation of the commission was a follow-up to a recommendation by a three-man panel which was tasked to determine the authenticity of a video clip of a telephone conversation that raised the allegation.

Following the findings of the Royal Commission, the Malaysian cabinet ordered the Attorney-General to immediately direct agencies to investigate the allegations levelled against six prominent individuals identified in the Lingam video clip affair. The six are former prime minister Mahathir Mohamad, retired chief justices Mohd Eusoff Chin and Ahmad Fairuz Sheikh Abdul Halim, former minister in the Prime Minister's Department Tengku Adnan Mansor, tycoon Vincent Tan and prominent lawyer V. K. Lingam.

There was sufficient cause to invoke the Sedition Act 1948, the Prevention of Corruption Act 1961, the Legal Profession Act 1976, the Official Secrets Act 1972 and the Penal Code against some of the principal individuals involved, however as of recently, no action has been taken by the Barisan Nasional government against the individuals involved.

=== Female bloggers controversy ===
Adnan was involved in controversy with regards to a statement he made about female bloggers where he was quoted as calling female bloggers liars. This caused an uproar among the blogger community and attracted a lot of negative reactions. He was quoted as saying in Malaysian Chinese newspaper Sin Chew Daily and Singaporean English daily, the Straits Times:

...All bloggers are liars, they cheat people using all kinds of methods. From my understanding, out of 10,000 unemployed bloggers, 8,000 are women.

=== Federal territories expansion proposal ===
In 2017 Tengku Adnan participated in a radio interview in which he discussed his plan to expand the federal territories to include Penang, Langkawi and parts of Malacca. he explained that his goal was to "ensure equal development in the northern state".

=== Tax evasion ===
On 24 July 2019, the government had filed a lawsuit through the Inland Revenue Board (IRB), against Adnan to claim RM57.17 million in unpaid taxes since 2012 till 2017.

=== Title controversy ===
Adnan claims that his title is not from Malaysia but hereditary from a line of Aceh warriors.

== Personal life ==
Adnan is married to Datin Seri Utama Anggraini binti Sentiyaki. They have two sons and four daughters together which is Dr. Tengku Iqbal Munawwir, Tengku Natasya Puteri, Tengku Muhammed Hafiz, Tengku Nadira Munawarah, Tengku Najwa Munawarah and Tengku Nabila Puteri. Adnan has two sons and two daughters from his previous marriage who is Tengku Daud, Tengku Balqish, Tengku Yazir and Tengku Nadiah.

His daughter, Tengku Natasya Puteri married Tengku Arif Bendahara Tengku Muhammad Iskandar Ri'ayatuddin Shah on 24 October 2024 at Balai Mahkota Istana Abdulaziz, Kuantan, Pahang.

== Election results ==
Parliament of Malaysia
Year	Constituency	Candidate	Votes	Pct	Opponent(s)	Votes	Pct	Ballots cast	Majority	Turnout
2004	P125 Putrajaya	Tengku Adnan Tengku Mansor (UMNO)	4,086	87.64%	Abdul Rahman Othman (PKR)	540	11.58%	4,662	3,546	91.79%
2008	P125 Putrajaya	Tengku Adnan Tengku Mansor (UMNO)	4,038	74.56%	Mohamad Noor Mohamad (PAS)	1,304	24.08%	5,416	2,734	81.96%
2013	P125 Putrajaya	Tengku Adnan Tengku Mansor (UMNO)	9,943	69.09%	Husam Musa (PAS)	4,402	30.59%	14,465	5,541	91.60%
2018	P125 Putrajaya	Tengku Adnan Tengku Mansor (UMNO)	12,148	49.47%	Samsu Adabi Mamat (BERSATU)	8,776	35.74%	24,881	3,372	91.12%
2018	P125 Putrajaya	Tengku Adnan Tengku Mansor (UMNO)	12,148	49.47%	Zainal Abidin Kidam (PAS)	3,634	14.80%	24,881	3,372	91.12%
2022	P125 Putrajaya	Tengku Adnan Tengku Mansor (UMNO)	13,692	37.37%	Mohd Radzi Md Jidin (BERSATU)	16,002	43.67%	36,969	2,310	86.21%
2022	P125 Putrajaya	Tengku Adnan Tengku Mansor (UMNO)	13,692	37.37%	Noraishah Mydin Abdul Aziz (PKR)	5,988	16.34%	36,969	2,310	86.21%
2022	P125 Putrajaya	Tengku Adnan Tengku Mansor (UMNO)	13,692	37.37%	Rosli Ramli (PEJUANG)	878	2.40%	36,969	2,310	86.21%
2022	P125 Putrajaya	Tengku Adnan Tengku Mansor (UMNO)	13,692	37.37%	Samsudin Mohamad Fauzi (IND)	63	0.17%	36,969	2,310	86.21%
2022	P125 Putrajaya	Tengku Adnan Tengku Mansor (UMNO)	13,692	37.37%	Lim Fic Bee (IND)	20	0.05%	36,969	2,310	86.21%

== Honours ==
- Malaysia
  - Commander of the Order of Meritorious Service (PJN) – Datuk (2000)
  - Officer of the Order of the Defender of the Realm (KMN) (1992)
- Federal Territory (Malaysia)
  - Grand Knight of the Order of the Territorial Crown (SUMW) – Datuk Seri Utama (2011)
- Kedah
  - Knight Companion of the Order of Loyalty to the Royal House of Kedah (DSDK) – Dato' (1997)
- Kelantan
  - Knight Grand Commander of the Order of the Life of the Crown of Kelantan (SJMK) – Dato' (2003)
- Malacca
  - Grand Commander of the Exalted Order of Malacca (DGSM) – Datuk Seri (2005)
  - Companion Class I of the Exalted Order of Malacca (DMSM) – Datuk (2000)
- Pahang
  - Grand Knight of the Order of Sultan Ahmad Shah of Pahang (SSAP) – Dato' Sri (2006)
  - Grand Knight of the Order of the Crown of Pahang (SIMP) – formerly Dato', now Dato' Indera (2003)
  - Knight Companion of the Order of Sultan Ahmad Shah of Pahang (DSAP) – Dato' (1990)
  - Knight Companion of the Order of the Crown of Pahang (DIMP) – Dato' (1988)
- Sabah
  - Grand Commander of the Order of Kinabalu (SPDK) – Datuk Seri Panglima (2017)

== See also ==
- Putrajaya (federal constituency)
- List of people who have served in both Houses of the Malaysian Parliament

Preceded by Leo Michael Toyad	Malaysian Minister of Tourism; 14 February 2006 – 17 March 2008	Succeeded by Azalina Othman Said
Preceded by Raja Nong Chik Zainal Abidin	Minister of Federal Territories; 16 May 2013 - 10 May 2018	Succeeded by Khalid Abdul Samad
