= Fahmi Fadzil =

Malaysian politician, actor and writer

Yang Berhormat Dato' Seri Fahmi Fadzil DPPN DPMS PMW MP
- أحمد فهمي محمد فاضل
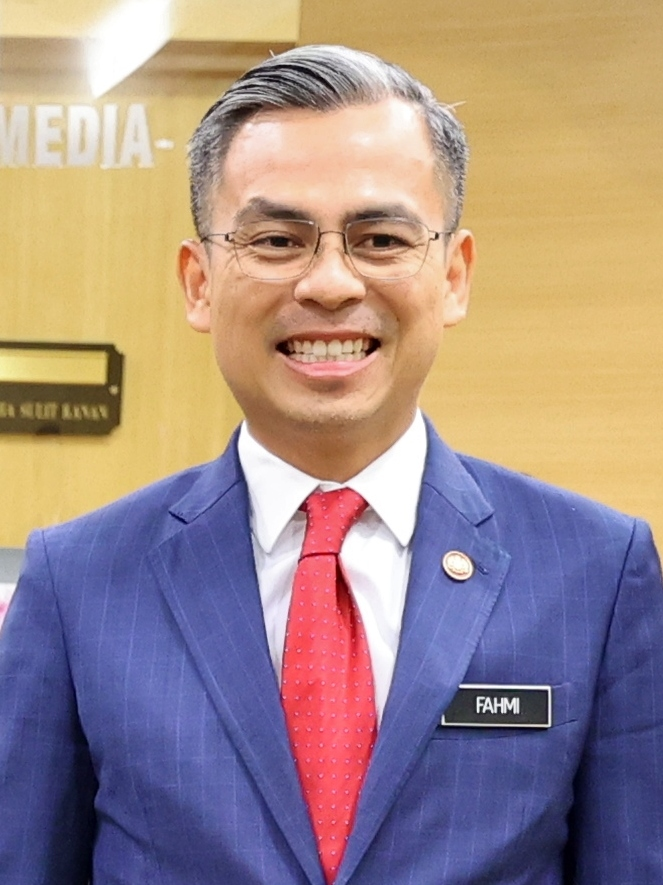
- Fahmi in 2023

Minister of Communications
- Incumbent
- Assumed office 12 December 2023
- Monarchs: Abdullah (2022–2024); Ibrahim (since 2024)
- Prime Minister: Anwar Ibrahim
- Deputy: Teo Nie Ching
- Preceded by: Himself (Minister of Communications and Digital)
- Constituency: Lembah Pantai

Minister of Communications and Digital
- In office 3 December 2022 – 12 December 2023
- Monarch: Abdullah
- Prime Minister: Anwar Ibrahim
- Deputy: Teo Nie Ching
- Preceded by: Annuar Musa (Minister of Communications and Multimedia)
- Succeeded by: Himself (Minister of Communications); Gobind Singh Deo (Minister of Digital)
- Constituency: Lembah Pantai

Information Chief of the People's Justice Party
- Incumbent
- Assumed office 20 July 2022
- President: Anwar Ibrahim
- Deputy: Chua Wei Kiat; Razeef Rakimin
- Preceded by: Shamsul Iskandar Md Akin

President of the Kuala Lumpur City F.C.
- Incumbent
- Assumed office 9 June 2023
- Preceded by: Shahidan Kassim

Communications Director of the People's Justice Party
- In office 11 September 2013 – 20 July 2022
- President: Wan Azizah Wan Ismail (2013–2018); Anwar Ibrahim (2018–2022)
- Preceded by: Nik Nazmi Nik Ahmad
- Succeeded by: Lee Chean Chung

Member of the Malaysian Parliament for Lembah Pantai
- Incumbent
- Assumed office 9 May 2018
- Preceded by: Nurul Izzah Anwar (PR–PKR)
- Majority: 5,598 (2018); 13,912 (2022)

Personal details
- Born: Ahmad Fahmi bin Mohamed Fadzil; 4 February 1981 (age 45) Kuala Lumpur, Malaysia
- Party: People's Justice Party (since 2010)
- Other political affiliations: Pakatan Rakyat (2010–2015); Pakatan Harapan (since 2015)
- Spouse: Azrina Puteri Mohamed Mahyuddin
- Children: 2
- Relatives: Ahmad Fikri Mohamed Fadzil (brother)
- Education: Purdue University (BS)
- Occupation: Politician; actor; writer
- Website: fahmifadzil.my

Ahmad Fahmi bin Mohamed Fadzil (Jawi: أحمد فهمي بن محمد فاضل; born 4 February 1981) is a Malaysian politician, former actor and writer serving as the Minister of Communications since December 2023. A member of People's Justice Party (PKR), he has been Member of Parliament for Lembah Pantai since May 2018. Fahmi also serves as the government spokesperson for the Anwar Ibrahim cabinet.

He previously served as the Minister of Communications and Digital prior to the 2023 cabinet reshuffle, and has also been PKR Information Chief since July 2022 and was previously PKR Communications Director from September 2013 to July 2022.

== Early life and education ==
Ahmad Fahmi bin Mohamed Fadzil was born on 4 February 1981 in Kuala Lumpur, Malaysia. He is second of three sons born to Datuk Fadzil Yunus, a former director-general of the Federal Land Development Authority group of companies and Datin Fauziah Ramly, who was a senior civil servant coming from Administrative and Diplomatic Officer (PTD) corps.

His maternal grandmother Hawa Musa was an UMNO Supreme Council member and head of KL Wanita Umno in the 1960s while his uncle Zainal Mokhtar Mohd Yunus was a single term state representative in Senaling from 1995 to 1999. His younger brother, Ahmad Fikri Mohamed Fadzil, is a singer-songwriter who performs and records under the Bayangan moniker.

His father is of Minangkabau descent from Kuala Pilah, Negeri Sembilan, belonging to the Sri Melenggang clan, while his mother was born in Kuala Kangsar, Perak, to a family that traces its roots to Langkat in North Sumatra.

Fahmi has a bachelor's degree of science in chemical engineering (BSChE) from Purdue University, Indiana, United States.

== Early career ==
Prior to formally joining PKR in 2010, Fahmi was a writer, actor and an award-winning theatre performer. He appeared in shows such as the 2006 TV series Gol & Gincu (Goalpost and Lipsticks) and hosted the interview program The Fairly Current Show.

He was also involved in social activism, joining the Taman Medan Community Arts Project in 2012. The project focused on addressing racial tensions among young people through performing and visual arts.

== Political career ==
He began his political career by serving as secretary to Nurul Izzah Anwar, who was Member of Parliament for Lembah Pantai. After her victory in the 2013 general election, he also assumed the role of PKR Communications Director and began writing a column for The Star called On The Way.

In 2018, Fahmi was chosen as the candidate to succeed Nurul Izzah as the party's candidate in the Lembah Pantai constituency while Nurul Izzah was moved to the PKR stronghold of Permatang Pauh. He subsequently won the seat with a 5,598 vote majority as PKR became the largest party in Parliament in the aftermath of GE14.

In the 15th General Election, Fahmi successfully defended his seat in Lembah Pantai with a larger majority of 13,912 votes defeating candidates from UMNO, PAS and Pejuang.

== Minister of Communications and Digital ==
Soon after the formation of the unity government led by Anwar Ibrahim, Fahmi was appointed the new Minister of Communications and Digital.

He announced that he hoped to help usher in a digital golden age by improving infrastructure, securing online data and bringing in investments.

He also said that the administration had no intention of curbing freedom of expression and free speech, but that it drew the line at spreading disinformation, defamation and online hate speech.

In his first year as Minister of Communications and Digital, there were a number of flashpoint incidents.

Fahmi faced criticism after questioning the findings of a survey on the government's first 100 days and accused some social media platforms of facilitating the promotion of fake news.

In July 2023, the Good Vibes Festival in Sepang was cancelled by the government after the member of The 1975 rock group Matty Healy condemned the country's anti-LGBT laws and kissed bandmate Ross MacDonald during the band's performance.

The Ministry of Communications and Digital issued an immediate cancellation directive that forced the three-day festival to shut down, saying it underlined its unwavering stance against any parties that challenge, ridicule or contravene Malaysian laws.

On 30 July 2023, a picture of Fahmi speaking at a mosque went viral, with the caption claiming he was delivering a political speech.

However, Fahmi later clarified that he was simply responding to a question about the Good Vibes cancellation.

In December 2023, as part of the Cabinet reshuffle, the Communications and Digital Ministry were split into two with Fahmi remaining as Communications Minister while Gobind Singh Deo took over at the helm of the newly formed Digital Ministry.

Fahmi was also appointed Cabinet spokesperson, tasked with speaking to the media, particularly after weekly Cabinet meetings if the prime minister was unable to attend.

== Communications Minister ==
=== Code of Ethics ===
In February 2024, he launched a new code of ethics for journalists, replacing the previous code that was established some 35 years previously.

It included eight key ethical points, including that journalists must be responsible, transparent, fair in disseminating information, not influenced by personal interests, deliver legitimate information, respect the privacy and confidentiality of their sources, understand the laws governing the media, and prioritise their journalistic skills.

Press Freedom

In May 2024, Malaysia was ranked 107th in the 2024 World Press Freedom Index Report published by Reporters Without Borders (RSF), a drop of 34 places compared to the previous year.

Fahmi admitted that being ranked 107 was unsatisfactory but pointed out in 2021 under the premiership of Muhyiddin Yassin, Malaysia was on the 119th rung while in 2022, the country was ranked 113th during Ismail Sabri Yaakob's tenure.

He added that not one journalist had been arrested nor brought to court ever since the administration took over and that he was committed to defending press freedoms.

It was also cited that press freedom was significantly better than during the Mahathir Mohamad administration in the 1980s and 1990s and the Najib Razak premiership of 2009–2018.

In May 2025, Malaysia's ranking improved noticeably by 19 places, jumping to 88th.

Social media licensing

On July 27, 2024, the Malaysian Communications and Multimedia Commission (MCMC) announced that all social media and internet messaging services with at least eight million registered users in Malaysia must apply for an Applications Service Providers Class [ASP(C)] Licence under the Communications and Multimedia Act 1998 (Act 588) starting Jan 1, 2025.

In doing so, Fahmi emphasised that over 90% of complaints made to the MCMC concerned scams, internet trafficking, sexual abuse material, grooming, illegal drug sales, access to weapons and the spread of terrorist ideology and hate speech.

In December 2024, he drafted changes to the Malaysia's Communications and Multimedia Act saying that it would enhance Malaysians’ freedom of speech partly by clarifying overly broad provisions.

He said that under the amendments, parodies and satirical content would not be criminalised.

Media workers’ welfare

On February 19, 2025, he held a meeting with about 30 representatives of media organisations to discuss the welfare of media personnel.

This came after retrenchment exercises led to the loss of over 100 jobs in the media industry, while other employers were guilty of delayed payment of salaries and non-compliance with employee benefits.

Fahmi revealed that he had been helping media workers behind the scenes but was calling the meeting to hold industry owners accountable for their workers’ welfare.

Media Council Bill

The next week, on February 26, 2025, Malaysia's Dewan Rakyat passed the Malaysian Media Council Bill.

Fahmi called it a significant victory for media freedom and added that he hoped the Media Council could be fully established before the end of the year. He noted that the bill was unique in that it guaranteed minority representation of women and East Malaysians.

He noted that it was a historic moment as the idea for the law was first conceived in 1973, also expressing the wish that a self-regulating body would help safeguard media freedom and look into other issues such as the welfare of media industry workers.

On November 7, 2025, the Media Council held its first AGM and elected a new line-up of officials.

In January 2026, Fahmi said that he would meet with the media council to find ways to tackle repressive laws affecting media freedoms.

PKR Congress

In May 2025, Fahmi came in top in the race for the PKR central leadership council. He secured 4811 votes to come in ahead of Adam Adli and Chan Ming Kai in a very crowded field of 104 candidates vying for 20 spots.

Under-16 social media regulations

On March 4, 2026, Fahmi announced that Malaysian children under the age of 16 would no longer be allowed to open their own social media accounts, while accounts managed by parents on behalf of their children are permitted.

He said the measure was intended to protect minors from online harms, such as exposure to predators. He said that the measure would be fully implemented by the end of June 2026.

FINAS amendments and restructuring

Fahmi announced in September 2025 that internal restructuring would be carried out at the National Film Development Corporation Malaysia (FINAS) in order to create a more transparent space for the local film industry.

He said this after FINAS chairman Hans Isaac denied allegations of the existence of a cartel in the film industry, which were levelled by actor Afdlin Shauki.

Fahmi also tabled amendments to the FINAS Act which he said were aimed at supporting the growth of the local film industry without turning FINAS itself into a film producer.

He clarified that the proposed establishment of a company under FINAS was solely to manage and maintain infrastructure such as training facilities, equipment, and other film-related assets.

Papagomo defamation suit

On April 6, Fahmi appeared at the KL High Court for a hearing of his defamation suit against blogger Wan Muhammad Azri Wan Deris (Papagomo), preacher Ahmad Dusuki Abd Rani and PAS politician Mohd Fauzan Madzlan.

This came after the trio falsely accused him of campaigning and delivering political speeches in a mosque, an allegation he denied.

On the evening of April 6, Fahmi withdrew the suits against Papagomo and Fauzan after both parties agreed that his speech at Masjid Nurul Yaqin, Kuang, Rawang, Selangor, on July 30, 2023, was not a political campaign or a politically motivated statement.

The next day Fahmi said that his legal team would review belligerent and contradictory social media posts by Papagomo over the matter and assess whether they violated the terms of the agreement in court.

Meanwhile in his testimony in the hearing against Ahmad Dusuki, Fahmi said that defamatory statements by the preacher had portrayed him in a negative light and tarnished his reputation as an MP and Cabinet minister. He said the statements were made with malice and contained no truth.

World Cup broadcast

On May 13, 2026, Fahmi announced that all 104 matches of the Fifa World Cup 2026 would be broadcast through Radio Televisyen Malaysia (RTM) and Unifi TV following a strategic collaboration.

It marked the first time in decades that the World Cup would be broadcast live in its entirety on free television stations.

Free medical postal delivery

On October 1, 2026, Fahmi launched Ubat Melalui Pos (UMP) a free medical postal delivery service that is a joint venture between his ministry and the Ministry of Health.

Under this initiative the cost of delivering medicines to over 80,000 patients in remote or impoverished areas will be absorbed by the Communications Ministry via the MCMC.

The project has been implemented nationwide with an allocation of about RM5 million.

== Personal life ==
Fahmi is married to Azrina Puteri Mohamed Mahyuddin, known as Myra. They have two sons.

== Election results ==
Parliament of Malaysia
| Year | Constituency | Candidate | Votes | Pct | Opponent(s) | Votes | Pct | Ballots cast | Majority | Turnout |
|---|---|---|---|---|---|---|---|---|---|---|
| 2018 | P121 Lembah Pantai | Fahmi Fadzil (PKR) | 33,313 | 50.24% | Raja Nong Chik Raja Zainal Abidin (UMNO) | 27,715 | 41.80% | 66,305 | 5,598 | 83.50% |
| 2018 | P121 Lembah Pantai | Fahmi Fadzil (PKR) | 33,313 | 50.24% | Fauzi Abu Bakar (PAS) | 5,277 | 7.96% | 66,305 | 5,598 | 83.50% |
| 2022 | P121 Lembah Pantai | Fahmi Fadzil (PKR) | 35,359 | 46.09% | Ramlan Shahean @ Askolani (UMNO) | 21,447 | 27.96% | 76,714 | 13,912 | 75.34% |
| 2022 | P121 Lembah Pantai | Fahmi Fadzil (PKR) | 35,359 | 46.09% | Fauzi Abu Bakar (PAS) | 19,098 | 24.60% | 76,714 | 13,912 | 75.34% |
| 2022 | P121 Lembah Pantai | Fahmi Fadzil (PKR) | 35,359 | 46.09% | Noor Asmah Mohd Razalli (PUTRA) | 810 | 1.06% | 76,714 | 13,912 | 75.34% |

== Honours ==
=== Honours of Malaysia ===
- Malaysia
  - Recipient of the 17th Yang di-Pertuan Agong Installation Medal (2024)
- Federal Territory (Malaysia)
  - Commander of the Order of the Territorial Crown (PMW) – Datuk (2025)
- Penang
  - Knight Commander of the Order of the Defender of State (DPPN) – Dato' Seri (2026)
- Selangor
  - Knight Commander of the Order of the Crown of Selangor (DPMS) – Dato' (2025)
  - Recipient of the Sultan Sharafuddin Silver Jubilee Medal (2026)

Parliament of Malaysia
| Preceded by Nurul Izzah Anwar | Member of Parliament for Lembah Pantai; 10 May 2018–present | Incumbent |
Party political offices
| Preceded by Nik Nazmi Nik Ahmad | Communications Director of the People's Justice Party (Malaysia); 11 September 2013–20 July 2022 | Succeeded by Lee Chean Chung |
