= Petra Jaya (disambiguation) =

Petra Jaya may refer to:

- Petra Jaya
- Petra Jaya (federal constituency), represented in the Dewan Rakyat

== See also ==
- Putrajaya (disambiguation)
