= Raja Nong Chik =

Malaysian politician, former Minister of Federal Territories and Urban Wellbeing

Yang Mulia Datuk Seri Utama Raja Nong Chik SUMW DPTJ AMN
- راج نوڠ چيق

Minister of Federal Territories and Urban Wellbeing
- In office 10 April 2009 – 15 May 2013
- Monarchs: Mizan Zainal Abidin; Abdul Halim
- Prime Minister: Najib Razak
- Deputy: Saravanan Murugan
- Preceded by: Zulhasnan Rafique
- Succeeded by: Tengku Adnan Tengku Mansor (Federal Territories); Abdul Rahman Dahlan (Urban Wellbeing)
- Constituency: Senator

Personal details
- Born: Raja Nong Chik bin Raja Zainal Abidin; 14 February 1953 (age 73) Perak, Federation of Malaya (now Malaysia)
- Citizenship: Malaysian
- Party: United Malays National Organisation (UMNO)
- Other political affiliations: Barisan Nasional (BN)
- Spouse: Nafesah Raja Nong Chik
- Children: Raja Farhana; Raja Hamzah
- Education: University of Wales
- Occupation: Politician
- Profession: Accountant
- Website: rajanongchik.com

Raja Nong Chik bin Raja Zainal Abidin (Jawi: راج نوڠ چيق بن راج زين العابدين; born 14 February 1953) is a Malaysian politician, accountant and the former Minister of Federal Territories and Urban Wellbeing. He was a Senator in the Dewan Negara, the upper house of the Parliament of Malaysia from the United Malays National Organisation (UMNO), a component party of the Barisan Nasional (BN) coalition.

== Background ==
Raja Nong Chik was born in the state of Perak in 1953 to a royal-linked family of civil servants. His grandfather, Mustafa Albakri was the first chairman of the Election Commission of Malaysia and also Keeper of the Rulers' Seal during the premiership of Tunku Abdul Rahman. His father, Raja Zainal Abidin Raja Tachik was secretary-general in the Ministry of Health under second prime minister Abdul Razak Hussein.

He attended Methodist Boys' School, Kuala Lumpur and later Victoria Institution before studying at the Royal Military College. He obtained his Bachelor of Economics from the University of Wales and is a certified accountant.

Raja Nong Chik began his career as an entrepreneur at the Federal Land Consolidation and Rehabilitation Authority (FELCRA) in 1978. He eventually rose to become executive director at a manufacturing company. As a prominent member in the Malaysian corporate scene, Raja Nong Chik became president of the Bumiputra Manufacturers' and Service Industry Association and also a member of the Malaysia Innovation Council.

He is currently the Patron of Kuala Lumpur FA.

== Political career ==
Raja Nong Chik is a member of UMNO from the Lembah Pantai division. He became a Senator in the Dewan Negara in April 2008, and was appointed Federal Territories and Urban Well-being Minister by new prime minister Najib Tun Razak. He resigned from the Dewan Negara in April 2013 to contest in Lembah Pantai constituency in the 13th Malaysian general election, which he lost to incumbent MP Nurul Izzah Anwar, daughter of former deputy prime minister and opposition leader Anwar Ibrahim. In the 14th General Election, he contested the Lembah Pantai seat once again, but lost to Fahmi Fadzil, PKR communications director.

== Election results ==
Parliament of Malaysia
Year	Constituency	Candidate	Votes	Pct	Opponent(s)	Votes	Pct	Ballots cast	Majority	Turnout
2013	P121 Lembah Pantai	Raja Nong Chik Zainal Abidin (UMNO)	29,161	48.33%	Nurul Izzah Anwar (PKR)	31,008	51.39%	61,048	1,847	84.30%
2013	P121 Lembah Pantai	Raja Nong Chik Zainal Abidin (UMNO)	29,161	48.33%	Rosli Baba (IND)	167	0.28%	61,048	1,847	84.30%
2018	P121 Lembah Pantai	Raja Nong Chik Zainal Abidin (UMNO)	27,715	41.80%	Fahmi Fadzil (PKR)	33,313	50.24%	66,305	5,598	83.50%
2018	P121 Lembah Pantai	Raja Nong Chik Zainal Abidin (UMNO)	27,715	41.80%	Fauzi Abu Bakar (PAS)	5,277	7.96%	66,305	5,598	83.50%

== Honours ==
- Malaysia
  - Member of the Order of the Defender of the Realm (AMN) (2000)
- Negeri Sembilan
  - Knight Commander of the Grand Order of Tuanku Jaafar (DPTJ) – Dato' (2002)
- Federal Territory (Malaysia)
  - Grand Knight of the Order of the Territorial Crown (SUMW) – Datuk Seri Utama (2014)
