= Zulhasnan Rafique =

Malaysian politician

Yang Berbahagia Major (Rtd) Tan Sri Datuk Seri Utama Zulhasnan Rafique PSM SUMW SSAP DGPN DIMP AMN
- ذوالحسنان رفيق
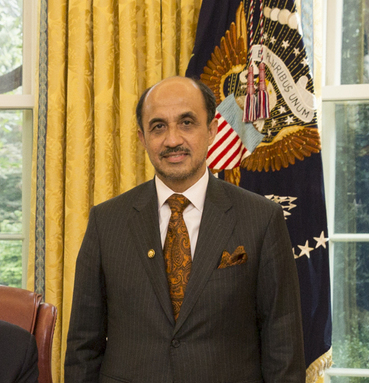

Minister of Federal Territories
- In office 14 February 2006 – 9 April 2009
- Monarchs: Sirajuddin; Mizan Zainal Abidin
- Prime Minister: Abdullah Ahmad Badawi
- Deputy: Abu Seman Yusop (2006–2008); Saravanan Murugan (2008–2009)
- Preceded by: Shahrizat Abdul Jalil (Acting)
- Succeeded by: Raja Nong Chik Zainal Abidin (as Minister of Federal Territories and Urban Wellbeing)
- Constituency: Setiawangsa

Deputy Minister of Federal Territories
- In office 27 March 2004 – 14 February 2006
- Monarch: Sirajuddin
- Prime Minister: Abdullah Ahmad Badawi
- Minister: Mohd Isa Abdul Samad (2004–2005); Shahrizat Abdul Jalil (Acting) (2005–2006)
- Preceded by: Office established
- Succeeded by: Abu Seman Yusop
- Constituency: Setiawangsa

15th Malaysian Ambassador to the United States
- In office 28 December 2016 – 23 April 2018
- Monarch: Muhammad V
- Prime Minister: Najib Razak
- Preceded by: Awang Adek Hussin
- Succeeded by: Azmil Mohd Zabidi

Member of the Malaysian Parliament for Setiawangsa
- In office 21 March 2004 – 5 May 2013
- Preceded by: Constituency established
- Succeeded by: Ahmad Fauzi Zahari (BN–UMNO)
- Majority: 19,669 (2004); 8,134 (2008)

Member of the Malaysian Parliament for Wangsa Maju
- In office 29 November 1999 – 21 March 2004
- Preceded by: Kamal Mat Salih (BN–UMNO)
- Succeeded by: Yew Teong Look (BN–MCA)
- Majority: 5,618 (1999)

Personal details
- Born: Zulhasnan bin Rafique; 20 September 1954 (age 72) Selangor, Federation of Malaya (now Malaysia)
- Party: United Malays National Organisation (UMNO)
- Other political affiliations: Barisan Nasional (BN); Perikatan Nasional (PN); Muafakat Nasional (MN)
- Spouse: Siti Nooriah Razak
- Children: 3 children
- Occupation: Politician
- Profession: Military officer (fighter pilot)
- Website: www.umnosetiawangsa.com.my

Military service
- Allegiance: Malaysia; Yang di-Pertuan Agong
- Branch/service: Royal Malaysian Air Force
- Years of service: 12 years
- Rank: Major
- Unit: 12th Squadron RMAF
- Battles/wars: Ops Helang Malindo; Ops Kubay; Daoyai Musnah

Zulhasnan bin Rafique (Jawi: ذوالحسنان بن رفيق; born 20 September 1954) is a Malaysian politician and diplomat. He is the former Minister of Federal Territories, former Member of Parliament of Malaysia for Wangsa Maju and Setiawangsa constituencies in Kuala Lumpur and a supreme council member in the United Malays National Organisation (UMNO), the largest component party of the previously ruling coalition, Barisan Nasional (BN).

== Life ==
Zulhasnan Rafique received his secondary education at the Victoria Institution in Kuala Lumpur.

Zulhasnan joined the Royal Malaysian Air Force as a fighter pilot and retired in 1985 with the rank of Major (squadron leader in other countries) before entering politics.

== Politics ==
Zulhasnan debuted in the 1999 Malaysian general election and won the Wangsa Maju seat to be elected as a Member of Parliament. In the 2004 general election, he contested and won the Setiawangsa parliamentary seat. On 27 March 2004, following a cabinet reshuffle by Prime Minister Abdullah Ahmad Badawi, the Federal Territory and Klang Valley Planning and Development Division was upgraded to a full-fledged ministry. Its responsibility expanded to include jurisdiction over the territories of Labuan and Putrajaya. Zulhasnan was the first deputy minister to be appointed to the ministry.

Mohd Isa Abdul Samad was the first minister to be appointed. However, Isa was dismissed from office after he was found guilty of corruption charges related to money politics during the UMNO General Assembly Election of 2005. Shahrizat Abdul Jalil (then the Minister for Women, Family and Community Development) assumed the responsibilities of acting minister until a replacement could be found.

On 16 February 2006, Zulhasnan was appointed Federal Territories Minister. Under the leadership of Zulhasnan, a strategic plan that focused on development plans for all three Federal Territories was created. In the 2008 election, he was reelected again as a Member of Parliament. He was dropped from the new cabinet on 9 April 2009 by Najib Razak who took over as the 6th Prime Minister. He was not chosen by Barisan Nasional to recontest the Setiawangsa seat in the 2013 election.

He was appointed Malaysian Ambassador to the United States, replacing Awang Adek Hussin in December 2016. But resigned in April 2018 to contest in the 2018 election the Setiawangsa constituency again. Following the huge swing of votes to the coalition Pakatan Harapan, he lost and failed to win back his former parliamentary seat.

== Election results ==
Parliament of Malaysia
Year	Constituency	Candidate	Votes	Pct	Opponent(s)	Votes	Pct	Ballots cast	Majority	Turnout
1999	P105 Wangsa Maju	Zulhasnan Rafique (UMNO)	29,997	55.17%	Marina Mohd. Yusoff (keADILan)	24,379	44.83%	59,609	5,618	79.38%
2004	P118 Setiawangsa	Zulhasnan Rafique (UMNO)	27,757	77.44%	Abdul Rashid Hassan Basri (PAS)	8,088	22.56%	36,137	19,669	70.12%
2008	P118 Setiawangsa	Zulhasnan Rafique (UMNO)	25,489	59.49%	Ibrahim Yaacob (PKR)	17,355	40.51%	45,096	8,134	78.89%
2018	P118 Setiawangsa	Zulhasnan Rafique (UMNO)	20,099	33.03%	Nik Nazmi Nik Ahmad (PKR)	34,471	56.65%	61,884	14,372	85.79%
2018	P118 Setiawangsa	Zulhasnan Rafique (UMNO)	20,099	33.03%	Ubaid Abd Akla (PAS)	6,282	10.32%	61,884	14,372	85.79%

== Honours ==
=== Honours of Malaysia ===
- Malaysia
  - Commander of the Order of Loyalty to the Crown of Malaysia (PSM) – Tan Sri (2013)
  - Member of the Order of the Defender of the Realm (AMN) (1982)
- Federal Territory (Malaysia)
  - Grand Knight of the Order of the Territorial Crown (SUMW) – Datuk Seri Utama (2015)
- Pahang
  - Knight Grand Companion of the Order of Sultan Ahmad Shah of Pahang (SSAP) – Dato' Sri (2007)
  - Knight Companion of the Order of the Crown of Pahang (DIMP) – Dato' (1998)
- Penang
  - Commander of the Order of the Defender of State (DGPN) – Dato' Seri (2007)

== See also ==
- Wangsa Maju (federal constituency)
- Setiawangsa (federal constituency)
