= Setiawangsa (federal constituency) =

Constituency of Kuala Lumpur, Malaysia

Setiawangsa (P118)
Kuala Lumpur constituency

Federal constituency
- Legislature: Dewan Rakyat
- MP: Vacant
- Constituency created: 2003
- First contested: 2004
- Last contested: 2022

Demographics
- Population (2020): 147,095
- Electors (2022): 95,753
- Area (km²): 16
- Pop. density (per km²): 9,193.4

Setiawangsa is a federal constituency in the Federal Territory of Kuala Lumpur, Malaysia, that has been represented in the Dewan Rakyat since 2004.

The federal constituency was created in the 2003 redistribution and is mandated to return a single member to the Dewan Rakyat under the first past the post voting system.

== Demographics ==
Ethnic breakdown of Setiawangsa's electorate as of 2022
1. Malay (63.0%)
2. Chinese (24.5%)
3. Indian (11.1%)
4. Other ethnicities (1.50%)
Age breakdown of Setiawangsa's electorate as of 2022
1. 18-20 (5.28%)
2. 21-29 (20.4%)
3. 30-39 (25.9%)
4. 40-49 (17.5%)
5. 50-59 (14.2%)
6. 60-69 (11.2%)
7. 70-79 (4.18%)
8. 80-89 (1.09%)
9. above 90 (0.24%)
Gender breakdown of Setiawangsa's electorate as of 2022
1. Male (51.3%)
2. Female (48.7%)

== History ==
=== Polling districts ===
According to the gazette issued on 30 October 2022, the Setiawangsa constituency has a total of 17 polling districts.

Polling District	Code	Location
Jalan Usahawan	118/00/01	SK Marian Convent Setapak
Taman Sri Rampai	118/00/02	SK Taman Seri Rampai
Seksyen 5/6 Wangsa Maju	118/00/03	SMK Seksyen 5 Wangsa Maju
PKNS Batu 6 Ulu Klang	118/00/04	SK AU Keramat
Keramat Wangsa	118/00/05	SMK Keramat Wangsa
Taman Setiawangsa	118/00/06	SK Setiawangsa
Seksyen 10 Wangsa Maju	118/00/07	SK Wangsa Maju Zon R10
Desa Rejang	118/00/08	SMK Taman Seri Rampai
Taman Setapak Permai	118/00/09	Padang SMK Taman Seri Rampai
Taman Setapak Jaya	118/00/10	SK Seri Bonus
Ayer Panas Dalam	118/00/11	SMK (P) Air Panas
Ayer Panas Luar	118/00/12	SK Jalan Air Panas
Ayer Panas Tengah	118/00/13	SRA Al-Jam'iyyah
Jalan Pahang	118/00/14	SMK Tinggi Setapak
Taman Tasik	118/00/15	SMK Puteri Titiwangsa
PULAPOL	118/00/16	SK Polis Depot
MINDEF	118/00/17	SMK Padang Tembak

=== Representation history ===
Members of Parliament for Setiawangsa
Parliament	No	Years	Member	Party	Vote Share
Constituency created from Wangsa Maju and Titiwangsa
11th	P118	2004–2008	Zulhasnan Rafique (ذوالحسنان رفيق)	BN (UMNO)	27,757; 77.44%
12th	P118	2008–2013	Zulhasnan Rafique (ذوالحسنان رفيق)	BN (UMNO)	25,489; 59.49%
13th	P118	2013–2018	Ahmad Fauzi Zahari (احمد فوزي زاهري)	BN (UMNO)	26,809; 51.33%
14th	P118	2018–2022	Nik Nazmi Nik Ahmad (نئ نظمي نئ أحمد)	PH (PKR)	34,471; 56.65%
15th	P118	2022–2026	Nik Nazmi Nik Ahmad (نئ نظمي نئ أحمد)	PH (PKR)	34,434; 46.06%
15th	P118	2026–present	Vacant		

=== Historical boundaries ===
Federal constituency	Area	
Federal constituency	2003	2018
Setiawangsa	Ayer Panas; Seksyen 5, 6 & 10 Wangsa Maju; Sri Rampai; Taman Setapak Jaya; Wangsa Melawati	Ayer Panas; Taman Tasik Titiwangsa; Seksyen 5, 6 & 10 Wangsa Maju; Sri Rampai; Taman Setapak Jaya

=== Local governments & postcodes ===
No.	Local Government	Postcode
P118	Kuala Lumpur City Hall	50634, 53000, 54000, 54100, 54200 Kuala Lumpur

== Election results ==
Malaysian general election, 2022
Party	Candidate	Votes	%	∆%
PH	Nik Nazmi Nik Ahmad	34,434	46.06	▲46.06
PN	Nurul Fadzilah Kamaruddin	22,270	29.79	▲29.79
BN	Izudin Ishak	16,333	21.85	▼11.18
PEJUANG	Bibi Sunita Sakandar Khan	953	1.27	▲1.27
Independent	Mior Rosli Mior Mohd Jaafar	492	0.66	▲0.66
Independent	Stanley Lim Yen Tiong	282	0.38	▲0.38
Total valid votes		74,764	100.00	
Total rejected ballots		696		
Unreturned ballots		295		
Turnout		76,725	78.08	▼7.71
Registered electors		95,753		
Majority		12,614	16.27	▼7.35
PH hold		Swing		
Source(s) https://lom.agc.gov.my/ilims/upload/portal/akta/outputp/1753271/PUB%20613%20(2022)%20-%20PARLIMEN%20WP%20KUALA%20LUMPUR.pdf

Malaysian general election, 2018
Party	Candidate	Votes	%	∆%
PKR	Nik Nazmi Nik Ahmad	34,471	56.65	▲7.98
BN	Zulhasnan Rafique	20,099	33.03	▼18.36
PAS	Ubaid Abd Akla	6,282	10.32	▲10.32
Total valid votes		60,852	100.00	
Total rejected ballots		693		
Unreturned ballots		339		
Turnout		61,884	85.79	▲0.87
Registered electors		72,136		
Majority		14,372	23.62	▲20.96
PKR gain from BN		Swing		?
Source(s) "His Majesty's Government Gazette - Notice of Contested Election, Parliament for the Federal Territory of Kuala Lumpur [P.U. (B) 240/2018]" (PDF). Attorney General's Chambers of Malaysia. 3 May 2018. "Federal Government Gazette - Results of Contested Election and Statements of the Poll after the Official Addition of Votes, Parliamentary Constituencies for the Federal Territory of Kuala Lumpur [P.U. (B) 314/2018]" (PDF). Attorney General's Chambers of Malaysia. 28 May 2018.

Malaysian general election, 2013
Party	Candidate	Votes	%	∆%
BN	Ahmad Fauzi Zahari	26,809	51.33	▼8.16
PKR	Ibrahim Yaacob	25,419	48.67	▲8.16
Total valid votes		52,228	100.00	
Total rejected ballots		502		
Unreturned ballots		180		
Turnout		52,910	84.92	▲6.03
Registered electors		62,309		
Majority		1,390	2.66	▼16.32
BN hold		Swing		
Source(s) "Federal Government Gazette - Notice of Contested Election, Parliament for the Federal Territory of Kuala Lumpur [P.U. (B) 177/2013]" (PDF). Attorney General's Chambers of Malaysia. 26 April 2013. Archived from the original (PDF) on 2018-10-02. "Federal Government Gazette - Results of Contested Election and Statements of the Poll after the Official Addition of Votes, Parliamentary Constituencies for the Federal Territory of Kuala Lumpur [P.U. (B) 218/2013]" (PDF). Attorney General's Chambers of Malaysia. 22 May 2013. Archived from the original (PDF) on 2018-10-02.

Malaysian general election, 2008
Party	Candidate	Votes	%	∆%
BN	Zulhasnan Rafique	25,489	59.49	▼17.95
PKR	Ibrahim Yaacob	17,355	40.51	▲40.51
Total valid votes		42,844	100.00	
Total rejected ballots		918		
Unreturned ballots		1,334		
Turnout		45,096	78.89	▲8.77
Registered electors		57,161		
Majority		8,134	18.98	▼35.90
BN hold		Swing		

Malaysian general election, 2004
Party	Candidate	Votes	%
BN	Zulhasnan Rafique	27,757	77.44
PAS	Abdul Rashid Hassan Basri	8,088	22.56
Total valid votes		35,845	100.00
Total rejected ballots		292	
Unreturned ballots		0	
Turnout		36,137	70.12
Registered electors		51,531	
Majority		19,669	54.88
This was a new constituency created.
