= Lembah Pantai (federal constituency) =

Constituency in Kuala Lumpur, Malaysia

Lembah Pantai (P121)
Kuala Lumpur constituency

Federal constituency
- Legislature: Dewan Rakyat
- MP: Ahmad Fahmi Mohamed Fadzil; PH
- Constituency created: 1984
- First contested: 1986
- Last contested: 2022

Demographics
- Population (2020): 148,094
- Electors (2022): 101,828
- Area (km²): 20
- Pop. density (per km²): 7,404.7

Lembah Pantai is a federal constituency in the Federal Territory of Kuala Lumpur, Malaysia, that has been represented in the Dewan Rakyat since 1986.

The federal constituency was created in the 1984 redistribution and is mandated to return a single member to the Dewan Rakyat under the first past the post voting system.

== Demographics ==
Ethnic breakdown of Lembah Pantai's electorate as of 2022
1. Malay (59.1%)
2. Chinese (19.1%)
3. Indian (17.2%)
4. Other ethnicities (4.61%)
Age breakdown of Lembah Pantai's electorate as of 2022
1. 18-20 (4.01%)
2. 21-29 (15.8%)
3. 30-39 (22.5%)
4. 40-49 (18.9%)
5. 50-59 (16.6%)
6. 60-69 (13.3%)
7. 70-79 (6.36%)
8. 80-89 (2.04%)
9. above 90 (0.46%)
Gender breakdown of Lembah Pantai's electorate as of 2022
1. Male (52.1%)
2. Female (47.9%)

== History ==
=== Polling districts ===
According to the gazette issued on 31 October 2022, the Lembah Pantai constituency has a total of 18 polling districts.

Polling District	Code	Location
Tasik Perdana	121/00/01	SMK (P) Methodist, Jalan Cenderasari
Bukit Travers	121/00/02	SJK (T) Jalan Bangsar
Jalan Maarof	121/00/03	SMK Bukit Bandaraya
Bukit Bangsar	121/00/04	SMK Bangsar
Bangsar Baru	121/00/05	SK Bukit Bandaraya; Kompleks Sukan Bangsar
Taman Lucky	121/00/06	SK Bukit Pantai
Kawasan Universiti	121/00/07	Gelanggang Tenis Institut Pendidikan Guru Malaysia Kampus Bahasa Antarabangsa
Pantai Baharu	121/00/08	SRA Ar-Rahah, Kerinchi
Bukit Kerinchi	121/00/09	SMK Seri Pantai
Kampung Haji Abdullah Hukum	121/00/10	SRA Ibnu Sina
Kampung Pantai Halt	121/00/11	SRA Abdullah Ibnu Abbas
Taman Bukit Angkasa	121/00/12	SK Bangsar; Padang PPR Kerinchi
Pantai Hill Park	121/00/13	Kompleks Sukan Pantai Eco Park
Pantai Dalam	121/00/14	SRA Al-Khawarizmi (SRA Seri Lembah Pantai)
Kampung Pasir	121/00/15	Padang Bola Sepak Kampung Pasir Baru Jalan Kelang Lama
Petaling Selatan	121/00/16	SJK (T) Saraswathy
Taman Sri Sentosa Utara	121/00/17	SMK Petaling
Taman Sri Sentosa Selatan	121/00/18	SK Petaling 1; SK Petaling 2

=== Representation history ===
Members of Parliament for Lembah Pantai
Parliament	No	Years	Member	Party	Vote Share
Constituency created from Damansara and Sungai Besi
7th	P100	1986–1990	Abdul Razak Abu Samah (عبدالرزاق أبو سماح)	BN (UMNO)	21,408; 58.33%
8th	P100	1990–1995	Mohamed Kamal Hussain (محمد كمال حسين)	BN (UMNO)	25,643; 58.34%
9th	P109	1995–1999	Shahrizat Abdul Jalil (شهريزات عبدالجليل)	BN (UMNO)	23,447; 69.98%
10th	P109	1999–2004	Shahrizat Abdul Jalil (شهريزات عبدالجليل)	BN (UMNO)	18,726; 52.02%
11th	P121	2004–2008	Shahrizat Abdul Jalil (شهريزات عبدالجليل)	BN (UMNO)	26,474; 70.30%
12th	P121	2008–2013	Nurul Izzah Anwar (نورالعزّة أنوار)	PR (PKR)	21,728; 52.93%
13th	P121	2013–2015	Nurul Izzah Anwar (نورالعزّة أنوار)	PR (PKR)	31,008; 51.39%
13th	P121	2015–2018	Nurul Izzah Anwar (نورالعزّة أنوار)	PH (PKR)	31,008; 51.39%
14th	P121	2018–2022	Ahmad Fahmi Mohamed Fadzil (أحمد فهمي محمد فاضل)	PH (PKR)	33,313; 50.24%
15th	P121	2022–present	Ahmad Fahmi Mohamed Fadzil (أحمد فهمي محمد فاضل)	PH (PKR)	35,539; 46.09%

=== Historical boundaries ===
Federal constituency	Area			
Federal constituency	1984	1994	2003	2018
Lembah Pantai	Bangsar; Brickfields; Kampung Kerinchi; Pantai Dalam; Segambut	Bangsar; Brickfields; Bukit Bandaraya; Kampung Kerinchi; Pantai Dalam		Bangsar; Bukit Bandaraya; Kampung Kerinchi; Pantai Dalam; Seri Sentosa

=== Local governments & postcodes ===
No.	Local Government	Postcode
P121	Kuala Lumpur City Hall	50000, 50480, 50560, 50603, 58000, 58100, 58200, 59000, 59100, 59200 Kuala Lumpur

== Election results ==
Malaysian general election, 2022
Party	Candidate	Votes	%	∆%
PH	Fahmi Fadzil	35,359	46.09	▲46.09
BN	Ramlan Shahean @ Askolani	21,447	27.96	▼13.84
PN	Fauzi Abu Bakar	19,098	24.90	▲24.90
PEJUANG	Noor Asmah Mohd Razalli	810	1.06	▲1.06
Total valid votes		76,714	100.00	
Total rejected ballots		515		
Unreturned ballots		240		
Turnout		77,469	76.08	▼8.12
Registered electors		101,828		
Majority		13,912	18.13	▲9.63
PH hold		Swing		
Source(s) https://lom.agc.gov.my/ilims/upload/portal/akta/outputp/1753271/PUB%20613%20(2022)%20-%20PARLIMEN%20WP%20KUALA%20LUMPUR.pdf

Malaysian general election, 2018
Party	Candidate	Votes	%	∆%
PKR	Fahmi Fadzil	33,313	50.24	▼1.15
BN	Raja Nong Chik Zainal Abidin	27,715	41.80	▼6.53
PAS	Fauzi Abu Bakar	5,277	7.96	▲7.96
Total valid votes		66,305	100.00	
Total rejected ballots		538		
Unreturned ballots		216		
Turnout		67,059	83.46	▼0.87
Registered electors		80,346		
Majority		5,598	8.44	▲5.38
PKR hold		Swing		
Source(s) "His Majesty's Government Gazette - Notice of Contested Election, Parliament for the Federal Territory of Kuala Lumpur [P.U. (B) 240/2018]" (PDF). Attorney General's Chambers of Malaysia. 3 May 2018. "Federal Government Gazette - Results of Contested Election and Statements of the Poll after the Official Addition of Votes, Parliamentary Constituencies for the Federal Territory of Kuala Lumpur [P.U. (B) 314/2018]" (PDF). Attorney General's Chambers of Malaysia. 28 May 2018.

Malaysian general election, 2013
Party	Candidate	Votes	%	∆%
PKR	Nurul Izzah Anwar	31,008	51.39	▼1.54
BN	Raja Nong Chik Zainal Abidin	29,161	48.33	▲2.95
Independent	Rusli Baba	167	0.28	▲0.28
Total valid votes		60,336	100.00	
Total rejected ballots		519		
Unreturned ballots		193		
Turnout		61,048	84.33	▲11.45
Registered electors		72,396		
Majority		1,847	3.06	▼3.99
PKR hold		Swing		
Source(s) "Federal Government Gazette - Notice of Contested Election, Parliament for the Federal Territory of Kuala Lumpur [P.U. (B) 177/2013]" (PDF). Attorney General's Chambers of Malaysia. 26 April 2013. Archived from the original (PDF) on 2018-10-02. "Federal Government Gazette - Results of Contested Election and Statements of the Poll after the Official Addition of Votes, Parliamentary Constituencies for the Federal Territory of Kuala Lumpur [P.U. (B) 218/2013]" (PDF). Attorney General's Chambers of Malaysia. 22 May 2013. Archived from the original (PDF) on 2018-10-02.

Malaysian general election, 2008
Party	Candidate	Votes	%	∆%
PKR	Nurul Izzah Anwar	21,728	52.93	▲23.23
BN	Shahrizat Abdul Jalil	18,833	45.88	▼24.42
Independent	Periasamy Nagarathnam	489	1.19	▲1.19
Total valid votes		41,050	100.00	
Total rejected ballots		239		
Unreturned ballots		0		
Turnout		41,289	72.88	▲5.77
Registered electors		56,560		
Majority		2,895	7.05	▼33.55
PKR gain from BN		Swing		?

Malaysian general election, 2004
Party	Candidate	Votes	%	∆%
BN	Shahrizat Abdul Jalil	26,474	70.30	▲18.28
PKR	Sanusi Osman	11,186	29.70	▼18.28
Total valid votes		37,660	100.00	
Total rejected ballots		213		
Unreturned ballots		85		
Turnout		37,958	67.11	▼1.80
Registered electors		56,562		
Majority		15,288	40.60	▲36.56
BN hold		Swing		

Malaysian general election, 1999
Party	Candidate	Votes	%	∆%
BN	Shahrizat Abdul Jalil	18,726	52.02	▼17.96
PKR	Zainur Zakaria	17,272	47.98	▲47.98
Total valid votes		35,998	100.00	
Total rejected ballots		193		
Unreturned ballots		65		
Turnout		36,256	68.91	▲3.69
Registered electors		52,607		
Majority		1,454	4.04	▼35.92
BN hold		Swing		

Malaysian general election, 1995
Party	Candidate	Votes	%	∆%
BN	Shahrizat Abdul Jalil	23,447	69.98	▲9.64
S46	Mohd Salleh Abas	10,058	30.02	▼9.64
Total valid votes		33,505	100.00	
Total rejected ballots		286		
Unreturned ballots		193		
Turnout		33,984	65.22	▼0.91
Registered electors		52,108		
Majority		13,389	39.96	▲23.28
BN hold		Swing		

Malaysian general election, 1990
Party	Candidate	Votes	%	∆%
BN	Mohamed Kamal Hussain	25,643	58.34	▼0.49
S46	Marina Mohd. Yusoff	18,309	41.66	▲41.66
Total valid votes		43,952	100.00	
Total rejected ballots		541		
Unreturned ballots		0		
Turnout		44,493	66.13	▲7.65
Registered electors		67,283		
Majority		7,334	16.68	▼17.78
BN hold		Swing		

Malaysian general election, 1986
Party	Candidate	Votes	%
BN	Abdul Razak Abu Samah	21,408	58.83
DAP	Yap Kew Sing	8,868	24.37
SDP	Ahmad Nor	6,112	16.80
Total valid votes		36,388	100.00
Total rejected ballots		415	
Unreturned ballots		0	
Turnout		36,803	58.48
Registered electors		62,937	
Majority		12,540	34.46
This was a new constituency created.
