= Putrajaya (federal constituency) =

Constituency in Kuala Lumpur, Malaysia

Putrajaya (P125)
Putrajaya constituency

Federal constituency
- Legislature: Dewan Rakyat
- MP: Radzi Jidin; PN
- Constituency created: 2003
- First contested: 2004
- Last contested: 2022

Demographics
- Population (2020): 109,202
- Electors (2022): 42,881
- Area (km²): 49
- Pop. density (per km²): 2,228.6

Putrajaya is a federal constituency representing the Federal Territory of Putrajaya, Malaysia, that has been represented in the Dewan Rakyat since 2004.

The federal constituency was created from parts of the Sepang constituency in the 2003 redistribution and is mandated to return a single member to the Dewan Rakyat under the first past the post voting system.

== Demographics ==
https://live.chinapress.com.my/ge15/parliament/PUTRAJAYA

While this Malaysian parliamentary constituency is the 'heart' of predominantly Malay/Muslim voters, Putrajaya might be considered as the only constituency area in the both Klang Valley and West-Coast Peninsular Malaysia where the Chinese voters forms only less than 1% of the overall voters in the parliamentary area.

Ethnic breakdown of Putrajaya's electorate as of 2022
1. Malay (95.4%)
2. Indian (2.60%)
3. Other ethnicities (1.10%)
4. Chinese (0.90%)

As of 2020, Putrajaya has a population of 109,202 people.

Age breakdown of Putrajaya's electorate as of 2022
1. 18-20 (8.33%)
2. 21-29 (21.0%)
3. 30-39 (29.7%)
4. 40-49 (21.9%)
5. 50-59 (10.2%)
6. 60-69 (7.43%)
7. 70-79 (1.32%)
8. 80-89 (0.13%)
9. above 90 (0.00%)
Gender breakdown of Putrajaya's electorate as of 2022
1. Male (49.4%)
2. Female (50.6%)

According to the August 2022 Electoral Roll used for the 2022 Malaysian general election, the Putrajaya constituency has 42,881 registered voters, of whom 95.4% are Malay, 0.90% are Chinese, 2.60% are Indian, and 1.10% are from other ethnic groups. In the 2018 general election, the constituency had 27,306 registered voters. The 2022 general election saw an increase of 15,575 voters, a 57.04% increase. In terms of percentage of voters by ethnic group, the Malay population increased by 1.23%, the Chinese increased by 0.01%, the Indian population decreased by 0.58%, and the other ethnic groups decreased by 0.68%.

Change of electorate in Putrajaya (by percentage)
Election	Electorate				Voters	Change
Election	Malay	Chinese	Indian	Other	Voters	Change
2022	95.4	0.90	2.60	1.10	42,881	+57.04%
2018	94.17	0.89	3.18	1.78	27,306	+72.92%
2013	94	1	3	2	15,791	+139%
2008	95	1	4	0	6,608	+30.10%
2004	95	2	3	1	5,079	－

== History ==
=== Polling districts ===
According to the gazette issued on 31 October 2022, the Putrajaya constituency has a total of 7 polling districts.

Polling District	Code	Location
Taman Saujana Hijau	125/00/01	SK Putrajaya Presint 11 (3); SMK Putrajaya Presint 11 (1)
Taman Rimba Desa Utara	125/00/02	SK Putrajaya Presint 9 (1); SRA Al-Najah
Taman Rimba Desa Timur	125/00/03	SMK Putrajaya Presint 9 (2)
Taman Rimba Desa Barat	125/00/04	SK Putrajaya Presint 9 (2)
Taman Wawasan Utara	125/00/05	SMK Putrajaya Presint 14 (1)
Taman Wawasan Selatan	125/00/06	SK Putrajaya Presint 8 (2)
Taman Warisan	125/00/07	SK Putrajaya Presint 16 (1); SK Putrajaya Presint 17 (1); SK Putrajaya Presint 18 (1)

=== Representation history ===
Members of Parliament for Putrajaya
Parliament	No	Years	Member	Party	Vote Share
Constituency created from Sepang
11th	P125	2004–2008	Tengku Adnan Tengku Mansor (تڠكو عدنان تڠكو منصور)	BN (UMNO)	4,086; 88.33%
12th	P125	2008–2013	Tengku Adnan Tengku Mansor (تڠكو عدنان تڠكو منصور)	BN (UMNO)	4,038; 75.99%
13th	P125	2013–2018	Tengku Adnan Tengku Mansor (تڠكو عدنان تڠكو منصور)	BN (UMNO)	9,943; 69.31%
14th	P125	2018–2022	Tengku Adnan Tengku Mansor (تڠكو عدنان تڠكو منصور)	BN (UMNO)	12,148; 49.47%
15th	P125	2022–present	Mohd Radzi Md Jidin (محمد راضي محمد جيدين)	PN (BERSATU)	16,002; 43.67%

=== Local governments & postcodes ===
No.	Local Government	Postcode
P125	Putrajaya City Corporation	62000, 62007, 62050, 62100, 62150, 62250, 62300, 62502, 62506, 62510, 62517, 62519, 62524, 62686 Putrajaya

== Election results ==
Malaysian general election, 2022
Party	Candidate	Votes	%	∆%
PN	Mohd Radzi Md Jidin	16,002	43.67	▲43.67
BN	Tengku Adnan Tengku Mansor	13,692	37.37	▼12.10
PH	Noraishah Mydin Abd Aziz	5,988	16.34	▲16.34
PEJUANG	Rosli Ramli	878	2.40	▲2.40
Independent	Samsudin Mohamad Fauzi	63	0.17	▲0.17
Independent	Lim Fice Bee	20	0.05	▲0.05
Total valid votes		36,643	100.00	
Total rejected ballots		168		
Unreturned ballots		158		
Turnout		36,969	86.21	▼5.39
Registered electors		42,881		
Majority		2,310	6.30	▼32.32
PN gain from BN		Swing		?
Source(s) https://lom.agc.gov.my/ilims/upload/portal/akta/outputp/1753267/PUB%20614%20(2022)%20-%20PARLIMEN%20WP%20PUTRAJAYA.pdf

Malaysian general election, 2018
Party	Candidate	Votes	%	∆%
BN	Tengku Adnan Tengku Mansor	12,148	49.47	▼19.84
PKR	Samsu Adabi Mamat	8,776	35.74	▲35.74
PAS	Zainal Abidin Kidam	3,634	14.80	▼15.89
Total valid votes		24,558	100.00	
Total rejected ballots		146		
Unreturned ballots		177		
Turnout		24,881	91.12	▼0.48
Registered electors		27,306		
Majority		3,372	13.73	▼24.89
BN hold		Swing		
Source(s) "His Majesty's Government Gazette - Notice of Contested Election, Parliament for the Federal Territory of Putrajaya [P.U. (B) 241/2018]" (PDF). Attorney General's Chambers of Malaysia. 3 May 2018. "Federal Government Gazette - Results of Contested Election and Statements of the Poll after the Official Addition of Votes, Parliamentary Constituencies for the Federal Territory of Putrajaya [P.U. (B) 315/2018]" (PDF). Attorney General's Chambers of Malaysia. 28 May 2018.

Malaysian general election, 2013
Party	Candidate	Votes	%	∆%
BN	Tengku Adnan Tengku Mansor	9,943	69.31	▼6.28
PAS	Husam Musa	4,402	30.69	▲6.28
Total valid votes		14,345	100.00	
Total rejected ballots		73		
Unreturned ballots		47		
Turnout		14,465	91.60	▲9.64
Registered electors		15,791		
Majority		5,541	38.62	▼12.56
BN hold		Swing		
Source(s) "Federal Government Gazette - Notice of Contested Election, Parliament for the Federal Territory of Putrajaya [P.U. (B) 178/2013]" (PDF). Attorney General's Chambers of Malaysia. 26 April 2013. "Federal Government Gazette - Results of Contested Election and Statements of the Poll after the Official Addition of Votes, Parliamentary Constituencies for the Federal Territory of Putrajaya [P.U. (B) 219/2013]" (PDF). Attorney General's Chambers of Malaysia. 22 May 2013.

Malaysian general election, 2008
Party	Candidate	Votes	%	∆%
BN	Tengku Adnan Tengku Mansor	4,038	75.59	▼12.74
PAS	Mohamad Noor Mohamad	1,304	24.41	▲24.41
Total valid votes		5,342	100.00	
Total rejected ballots		38		
Unreturned ballots		36		
Turnout		5,416	81.96	▼9.83
Registered electors		6,608		
Majority		2,734	51.18	▼25.48
BN hold		Swing		

Malaysian general election, 2004
Party	Candidate	Votes	%
BN	Tengku Adnan Tengku Mansor	4,086	88.33
PKR	Abdul Rahman Othman	540	11.67
Total valid votes		4,626	100.00
Total rejected ballots		28	
Unreturned ballots		8	
Turnout		4,662	91.79
Registered electors		5,078	
Majority		3,546	76.66
This was a new constituency created out of Sepang which went to BN in the previous election.
