= Shahrizat Abdul Jalil =

Malaysian politician

Yang Berbahagia Tan Sri Datuk Seri Panglima Shahrizat Abdul Jalil PSM SPDK SSAP DGPN DIMP
- شهرزاد بنت عبدالجليل
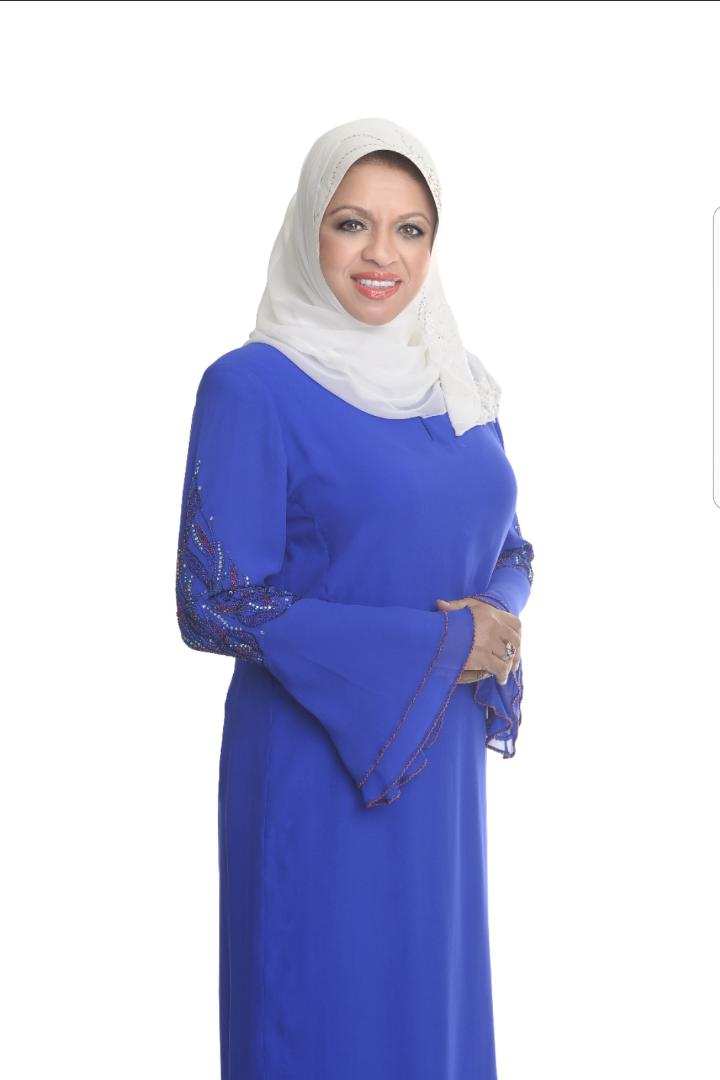

Women Chief of the United Malays National Organisation
- In office 26 March 2009 – 24 June 2018
- President: Najib Razak
- Deputy: Kamilia Ibrahim (2009–2013); Azizah Mohd Dun (2013–2018)
- Preceded by: Rafidah Aziz
- Succeeded by: Noraini Ahmad

Ministerial roles
- 1995–1999: Parliamentary Secretary of Youth and Sports
- 1999–2001: Deputy Minister in the Prime Minister's Department
- 2001: Minister of Women Affairs
- 2001–2004: Minister of Women and Family
- 2004–2008: Minister of Women, Family and Community Development
- 2005–2006: Acting Minister of Federal Territories
- 2009–2012: Minister of Women, Family and Community Development

Faction represented in Dewan Rakyat
- 1995–2008: Barisan Nasional

Faction represented in Dewan Negara
- 2009–2012: Barisan Nasional

Other roles
- 2008–2009: Special advisor to the prime minister on women and social development affairs

Personal details
- Born: Shahrizat binti Abdul Jalil; 15 May 1953 (age 73) Penang, Federation of Malaya (now Malaysia)
- Citizenship: Malaysian
- Party: United Malays National Organisation (UMNO)
- Other political affiliations: Barisan Nasional (BN)
- Spouse: Dr. Mohamad Salleh Ismail
- Children: 3
- Education: University of Malaya
- Occupation: Politician
- Profession: Lawyer

Shahrizat binti Abdul Jalil (Jawi: شهرزاد بنت عبدالجليل; born 15 August 1953) is a Malaysian politician who served in the Cabinet of Malaysia as Minister of Women, Family and Community Development from 2009 to 2012. She was the Member of Parliament for Lembah Pantai from 1995 to 2008 and subsequently served as a Senator in the Dewan Negara.

Shahrizat is the former Chairlady of the Women's wing of the United Malays National Organisation (UMNO), and therefore also the Chairlady of the Women's Wing of the ruling Barisan Nasional coalition. She is also the Advisor to the Prime Minister of Malaysia on Women Entrepreneurship and Professional Development.

Shahrizat is married to Mohamad Salleh Ismail with whom she has three children.

== Early life and education ==
Shahrizat was born on 15 August 1953 in Penang. She was an active student in academics and also curricular activities. She attended Northam Road Girls' School and Madrasah Tarbiah Islamiah during her primary years, and pursued her secondary education at St. George's Girls' School. She then continued her school education in the Kolej Tunku Kurshiah in Seremban, Negeri Sembilan. She attended University Malaya Law School and graduated with distinction in 1976. She then served as a magistrate for three years. Shahrizat was later appointed as the Assistant Treasury Solicitor. She leaves the public service sector in 1980 to become a partner in a law firm. Shahrizat was with Soo Thein Ming & Shahrizat for 16 years before she started her own legal firm, Tetuan Shahrizat & Tan, on 1 July 1983.

== Ministership ==
Shahrizat became the first minister for women and family development when the ministry was created by Prime Minister Mahathir Mohamad in 2001. Later, when Abdullah Ahmad Badawi became prime minister, he revamped the ministry and renamed it to Ministry for Women, Family and Community Development.

She was also acting Federal Territories Minister from 16 October 2005 until 14 February 2006, when fellow UMNO member Mohd Isa Abdul Samad had to step down from the post after being found guilty of corruption charges. Zulhasnan Rafique was later chosen to fill the post.

== Member of Parliament ==
Shahrizat was the Member of Parliament for the Lembah Pantai constituency in Kuala Lumpur from 1995 to 2008. Housing squatters in Lembah Pantai under her leadership has been Barisan Nasional's trump card. To date, some 90% of squatters in Lembah Pantai have been resettled and allowed to purchase their homes, according to Shahrizat.

When Shahrizat first became the area's MP in 1995, the problem of the day was squatters as well as other concerns, such as floods, fire, garbage collection, street lamps, and children's scholarships. Nevertheless, some have disputed her contribution to the development seen in the constituency, with most development being private sector driven initiatives, or projects under the Kuala Lumpur City Hall, which is unrelated to her position as an MP.

During the 1999 general election, Shahrizat narrowly defeated Zainur Zakaria. The counting of votes was fraught with controversy, and Shahrizat won after a recount was conducted.

In an upset during the 2008 general election, she lost her seat to a 27-year-old newcomer, Nurul Izzah Anwar, daughter of Parti Keadilan Rakyat (PKR) de facto leader, Anwar Ibrahim.

== Post 2008 general elections ==
Prime Minister Abdullah Ahmad Badawi appointed Shahrizat as Special Adviser to the Prime Minister for Women and Social Development Affairs on March 18, 2008, recognising that this wing was not represented in his cabinet.

It was said she would be working closely with the ministry she had once served. The special adviser position carries with it ministerial status whereby she gets access to information and is provided with an office and secretaries like a full Cabinet minister. However, she cannot attend Cabinet meetings.

Upon Shahrizat's victory as Wanita UMNO Chairlady on March 26, 2009, and Najib Tun Razak becoming prime minister, she was reappointed Minister of Women, Family and Community Development on April 10, 2009. To qualify to be appointed a minister, she was sworn in as a senator in the Dewan Negara the day before.

== Controversy ==
=== National Feedlot Corporation ===
In late 2011, the National Feedlot Corporation cattle-farming project in Gemas, Negeri Sembilan, became an issue of public interest. Shahrizat's husband, National Feedlot Corporation Sdn Bhd (NFCorp) executive chairman Datuk Seri Dr Mohamad Salleh Ismail, was charged with two criminal breach of trust charges, allegedly for misusing a loan meant for the development of the project. However, he was found to be innocent, and the Attorney-General's Chambers withdrew charges against him due to lack of evidence.

The Malaysian Anti-Corruption Commission (MACC) cleared Shahrizat of any wrongdoing in the NFC issue. MACC Chairman Tan Sri Dr Hadenan Abdul Jalil had said that the panel made the decision after studying investigation papers and reports from the Attorney General's Chambers, and closed the case against the former Women, Family and Community Development minister and cleared her name.

== Sources ==
Khoo Salma Nasution, Alison Hayes & Sehra Yeap Zimbulis: Giving Our Best: The Story of St George's Girls' School, Penang, 1885-2010, Areca Books, 2010

== Election results ==
Parliament of Malaysia
| Year | Constituency | Candidate | Votes | Pct | Opponent(s) | Votes | Pct | Ballots cast | Majority | Turnout |
|---|---|---|---|---|---|---|---|---|---|---|
| 1995 | P109 Lembah Pantai | Shahrizat Abdul Jalil (UMNO) | 23,447 | 68.99% | Mohd Salleh Abas (S46) | 10,058 | 29.60% | 33,984 | 13,389 | 65.22% |
| 1999 | P109 Lembah Pantai | Shahrizat Abdul Jalil (UMNO) | 18,726 | 51.65% | Zainur Zakaria (keADILan) | 17,272 | 47.64% | 36,256 | 1,454 | 68.91% |
| 2004 | P121 Lembah Pantai | Shahrizat Abdul Jalil (UMNO) | 26,474 | 69.75% | Sanusi Osman (PKR) | 11,186 | 29.47% | 37,958 | 15,288 | 67.11% |
| 2008 | P121 Lembah Pantai | Shahrizat Abdul Jalil (UMNO) | 18,833 | 45.61% | Nurul Izzah Anwar (PKR) | 21,728 | 52.62% | 41,289 | 2,895 | 72.88% |
| 2008 | P121 Lembah Pantai | Shahrizat Abdul Jalil (UMNO) | 18,833 | 45.61% | Periasamy Nagarathnam (IND) | 489 | 1.18% | 41,289 | 2,895 | 72.88% |

== Honours ==
=== Honours of Malaysia ===
- Malaysia
  - Commander of the Order of Loyalty to the Crown of Malaysia (PSM) – Tan Sri (2016)
- Pahang
  - Companion of the Order of the Crown of Pahang (DIMP) – Dato' (1996)
  - Grand Companion of the Order of Sultan Ahmad Shah of Pahang (SSAP) – Dato' Sri (2005)
- Penang
  - Commander of the Order of the Defender of State (DGPN) – Dato' Seri (2002)
- Sabah
  - Grand Commander of the Order of Kinabalu (SPDK) – Datuk Seri Panglima (2014)
