= 2022 Malaysian general election =

- 19 November 2022 (Note: Polling in 11 stations within the Baram constituency was delayed to 21 November due to flooding, while polling in Padang Serai was also delayed to 7 December due to the death of a candidate.)

All 222 seats in the Dewan Rakyat 112 seats needed for a majority
- Registered: 21,173,638 (▲41.72%)
- Turnout: 74.70% (▼7.63pp)
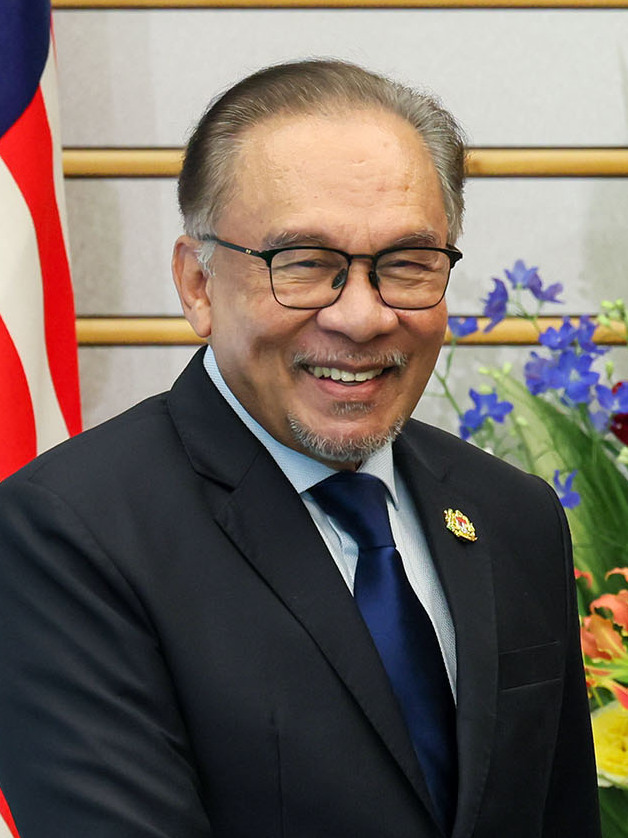

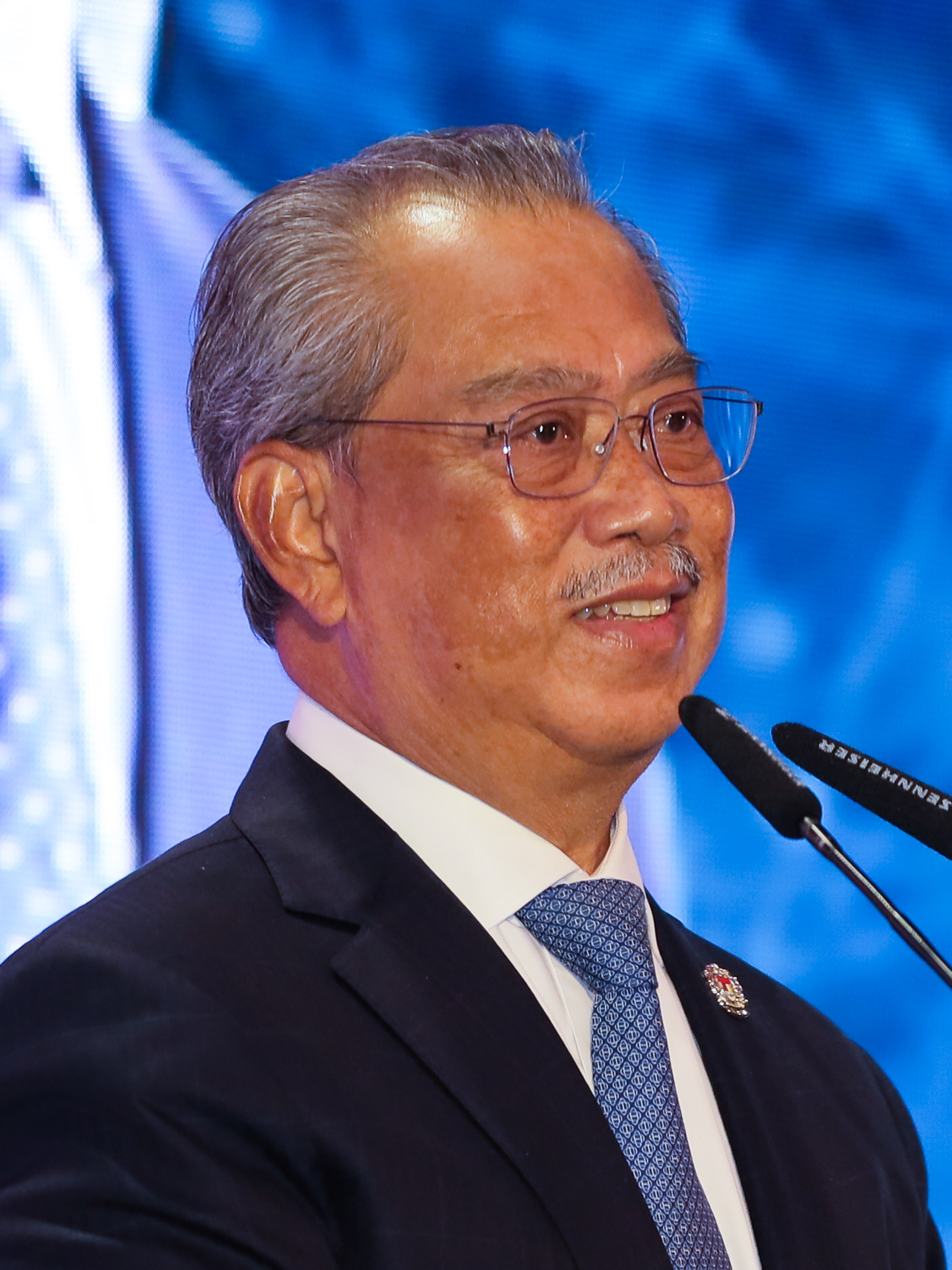

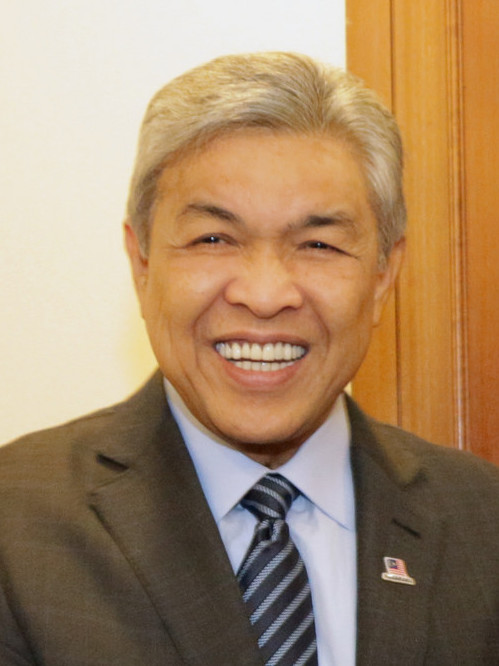

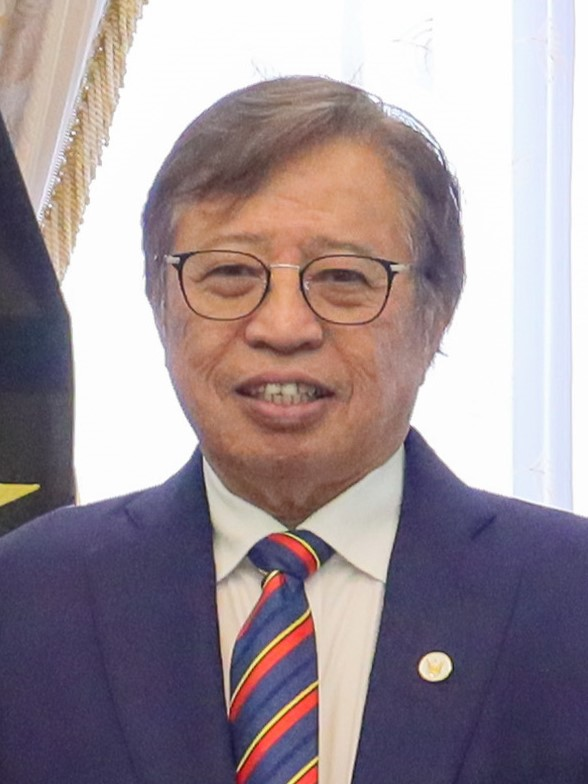

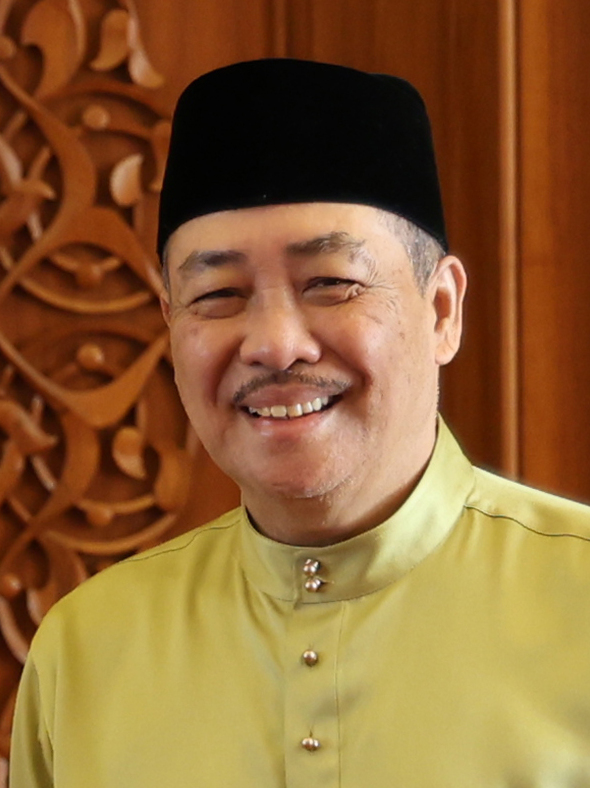

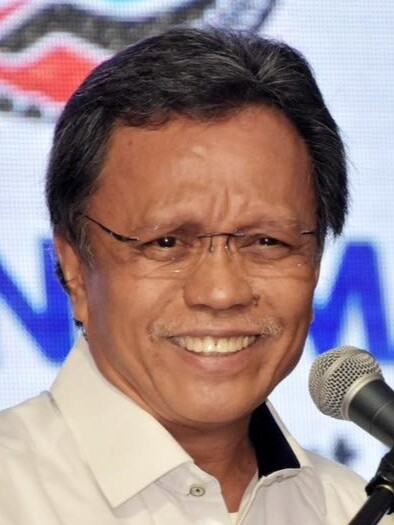
	First party	Second party	Third party
Leader	Anwar Ibrahim	Muhyiddin Yassin	Ahmad Zahid Hamidi (Note: Barisan Nasional named Ismail Sabri Yaakob as its Prime Ministerial candidate, however Ahmad Zahid Hamidi was the central leading figure throughout the election.)
Party	PKR	BERSATU	UMNO
Alliance	Pakatan Harapan	Perikatan Nasional	Barisan Nasional
Leader's seat	Tambun (Note: Incumbent for Port Dickson, but stood in this seat and won)	Pagoh	Bagan Datuk
Last election	40.16%, 101 seats (Note: Includes the total seats and vote share of UPKO, which joined after the last election, and excludes BERSATU, which left in 2020 to form Perikatan Nasional. The actual seats and vote share of Pakatan Harapan in the last election were 113 seats and 45.68% respectively.)	23.88%, 31 seats (Note: New coalition formed in 2020. Includes the total seats and vote share of BERSATU, PAS, and GERAKAN in the last election. The parties were previously part of Pakatan Harapan, Gagasan Sejahtera, and Barisan Nasional respectively.)	27.79%, 58 seats (Note: Excludes the total seats and vote share of PBB, PRS, PDP, SUPP, PBS, UPKO, GERAKAN, LDP, and PPP, which left after the last election. The actual seats and vote share of Barisan Nasional in the previous election were 79 seats and 33.77% respectively.)
Seats won	82 (Note: Includes MUDA.)	74	30
Seat change	▼19	▲43	▼28
Popular vote	5,931,856	4,719,665	3,459,988
Percentage	37.99%	30.23%	22.16%
Swing	▼2.17pp	▲6.35pp	▼5.63pp
	Fourth party	Fifth party	Sixth party
Leader	Abang Johari	Hajiji Noor	Shafie Apdal
Party	PBB	GRS	WARISAN
Alliance	GPS	GRS
Leader's seat	Not contesting (Note: Abang Johari is the Premier of Sarawak and sat as an MLA in the Sarawak State Legislative Assembly for Gedong.)	Not contesting (Note: Hajiji Noor is the Chief Minister of Sabah and sat as an MLA in the Sabah State Legislative Assembly for Sulaman.)	Semporna
Last election	3.82%, 19 seats (Note: New coalition formed in 2018. Includes the total seats and vote share of PBB, PRS, PDP, and SUPP in the last election. The parties were previously part of Barisan Nasional.)	0.71%, 2 seats (Note: New coalition officially formed in 2022. Includes the total seats and vote share of Sabah BERSATU, PBS, STAR, LDP, PHRS, USNO, SAPP and PCS in the last election. The parties were previously part of Barisan Nasional, United Sabah Alliance and United Borneo Alliance .)	2.32%, 8 seats
Seats won	23	6	3
Seat change	▲4	▲4	▼5
Popular vote	662,601	194,652	281,611
Percentage	4.24%	1.25%	1.80%
Swing	▲0.42pp	▲0.54pp	▼0.52pp
Prime Minister before election
Ismail Sabri Yaakob
BN
Elected Prime Minister
Anwar Ibrahim
PH

General elections were held in Malaysia on Saturday, 19 November 2022. The prospect of snap elections had been considered high due to the political crisis that had been ongoing since 2020; political instability caused by coalition or party switching among members of Parliament, combined with the fallout of the COVID-19 pandemic, contributed to the resignation of two prime ministers and the collapse of each of their respective coalition governments since the 2018 general elections.

The term of the 14th Parliament was due to expire on 16 July 2023, five years after its first meeting on 16 July 2018. However, the Yang di-Pertuan Agong (King of Malaysia), Abdullah of Pahang, dissolved parliament at the request of Prime Minister Ismail Sabri Yaakob on 10 October 2022 thus his first election for him since appointed in 2021. Constitutionally, the elections were required to be held within 60 days of the dissolution, making 9 December the last possible polling day.

Historically, general elections for all state legislative assemblies of Malaysia except Sarawak had been held concurrently as a cost-saving measure. However, the states could dissolve their own legislatures independently from Parliament, and several states (Sabah, Malacca and Johor) had held early elections due to the political instability, disrupting their usual electoral cycle. The governments of these states and Sarawak indicated that they would not be holding state elections concurrently. The governments of several other states, primarily those under a Pakatan Harapan or Perikatan Nasional government, stated that they would prefer to complete a full term. By 19 October, all Pakatan-led states, Penang, Selangor and Negeri Sembilan, as well as Perikatan-led states, Kedah, Kelantan and Terengganu, already confirmed not to be dissolving their state legislatures.

The elections were the first in which 18–20-year-olds were eligible to vote, following a constitutional amendment reducing the voting age from 21 to 18. Additionally, all voters were automatically registered, so the electorate expanded by around six million people or 31%.

Results for 220 out of all 222 contested seats in the Dewan Rakyat were announced by the morning of 20 November 2022, although polling in the constituency of Padang Serai was postponed until 7 December due to the death of the Pakatan Harapan candidate, Karuppaiya Muthusamy, three days before the elections. Voting in Baram was suspended on polling day due to flooding and inclement weather preventing polling workers from reaching the polling stations, and was instead completed on 21 November.

The elections resulted in a hung parliament, the first federal election to have had such a result in the nation's history. Pakatan Harapan remained the coalition with the most seats in the Dewan Rakyat albeit with a reduced share, with its largest losses in Kedah. Perikatan Nasional swept the northwestern and east coastal states of Peninsular Malaysia in a landslide, winning every seat in the states of Perlis, Kelantan and Terengganu, and all but one in Kedah; dubbed by many people as the "Green Wave" (Malay: "Gelombang Hijau"). The historically dominant Barisan Nasional fell to third place, having lost most of its seats to Perikatan Nasional.

A number of prominent incumbent Members of Parliament lost their seats, including former Prime Minister Mahathir Mohamad in Langkawi, where he also forfeited his deposit. Former Finance Minister Tengku Razaleigh Hamzah was defeated by a narrow margin in Gua Musang, while Trade Minister and former Menteri Besar of Selangor, Azmin Ali, lost in Gombak. Former Housing Minister Zuraida Kamaruddin was defeated in Ampang, and former Domestic Trade Minister Saifuddin Nasution Ismail lost in Kulim-Bandar Baharu. Also defeated were Nurul Izzah Anwar and Mukhriz Mahathir, the children of Anwar Ibrahim and Mahathir Mohamad, respectively. Former Ministers of the Federal Territories from Barisan Nasional and Pakatan Harapan, Tengku Adnan Tengku Mansor and Khalid Abdul Samad, were defeated in Putrajaya and Titiwangsa, respectively. Incumbent Finance Minister and Senator Tengku Zafrul Aziz failed to secure a seat in the Dewan Rakyat for Kuala Selangor, losing by a narrow margin. Similarly, Health Minister Khairy Jamaluddin, the son-in-law of former Prime Minister Abdullah Ahmad Badawi, was defeated by a slim majority in Sungai Buloh.

After securing support from Barisan Nasional, Gabungan Parti Sarawak, the Heritage Party, Malaysian United Democratic Alliance, Parti Bangsa Malaysia and several independent MPs, Pakatan Harapan chairman Anwar Ibrahim was appointed and sworn in as prime minister on 24 November 2022 by the Yang di-Pertuan Agong. Gabungan Rakyat Sabah also expressed its support for Anwar, while Perikatan Nasional opted to assume the role of the official opposition.

== Background ==
=== Previous election ===
The 2018 federal election resulted in a change in government for the first time in Malaysian history since direct elections were first held in 1955. Pakatan Harapan, then a centre-left coalition between four parties, won 113 seats in the Dewan Rakyat (a two-seat majority) against the right-wing Barisan Nasional coalition, which won 79 seats. Pakatan Harapan entered government at the federal level with support from the Sabah Heritage Party. The concurrent state elections also saw Pakatan Harapan winning a majority for the first time in Johor, Malacca and Negeri Sembilan. Hung parliaments were recorded in Kedah, Perak and Sabah, but changes in party membership of the legislators after the election allowed Pakatan Harapan (or the Sabah Heritage Party in Sabah) to enter government in these states as well.

=== Significant events ===
In July 2019, the Constitution (Amendment) Act 2019, which contained provisions to lower the voting age to 18 and allow for the automatic registration of voters, was enacted by Parliament. The Election Commission announced in June 2020 that preparations for these changes would be ready by July 2021. The 2022 election marked the first in which the 18–20 age group is entitled to vote.

Since losing re-election in 2018, former prime minister Najib Razak was put on trial, convicted and imprisoned in relation to the 1MDB scandal. The scandal severely impacted UMNO in the previous election and has a continuing legacy in Malaysian politics. Trials and investigations remain ongoing.

The COVID-19 pandemic in Malaysia emerged as a major health crisis from early 2020. It had significant impacts on Malaysia's economy and society.

=== 2020–22 political crisis ===
A political crisis began in Malaysia in early 2020, leading to the resignation of two prime ministers and significant shifts in parliament over the subsequent two years. In late February 2020, a majority of the 32 members of the Malaysian United Indigenous Party withdrew from the governing Pakatan Harapan-led coalition, causing it to lose its majority in the Dewan Rakyat, and partnered with Barisan Nasional. Prime Minister Mahathir Mohamad then resigned, creating a power vacuum in the executive branch. This movement later became known as Sheraton Move. On 1 March, Muhyiddin Yassin was appointed prime minister, and a Malaysian United Indigenous Party-led minority government was formed under new coalition Perikatan Nasional, with confidence and supply from Barisan Nasional. Political instability continued after this, exacerbated by the impact of the COVID-19 pandemic. The crisis escalated in mid-2021, leading to Muhyiddin losing parliamentary support over the COVID-19 response and resigning. On 20 August 2021, Ismail Sabri Yaakob was appointed prime minister as his replacement.

This political instability led to calls for a snap general election from various lawmakers, and there was speculation that one would be held since 2020. In June 2022, Ismail Sabri said he would not delay the dissolution of parliament, amid continued pressure from his party UMNO to hold a general election as soon as possible. He said he would consult with his allies in the Barisan Nasional alliance on the date, as well as leaders of his party UMNO. Ismail Sabri announced the dissolution on 10 October 2022.

== Electoral system ==
Elections in Malaysia are conducted at the federal and state levels. Federal elections elect members of the Dewan Rakyat, the lower house of Parliament, while state elections in each of the 13 states elect members of their respective state legislative assembly. As Malaysia follows the Westminster system of government, the head of government (Prime Minister at the federal level and the Chief Ministers, the so-called Menteri Besar, at the state level) is the person who commands the confidence of the majority of members in the respective legislature – this is normally the leader of the party or coalition with the majority of seats in the legislature.

The Dewan Rakyat consists of 222 members, known as Members of Parliament (MPs), that are elected for five-year terms. Each MP is elected from a single-member constituency using the first-past-the-post voting system. If one party obtains a majority of seats, then that party is entitled to form the government, with its leader becoming the prime minister. In the event of a hung parliament, where no single party obtains the majority of seats, the government may still form through a coalition or a confidence and supply agreement with other parties. In practice, coalitions and alliances in Malaysia generally persist between elections, and member parties do not normally contest for the same seats.

In July 2019, the Constitution (Amendment) Act 2019 was enacted that provided for the voting age to be lowered to 18 and for automatic registration of voters. Previously, the voting age was 21 although the age of majority in the country was 18. Automatic voter registration and the lowered voting age simultaneously came into effect in early 2022, with this election being the first federal election with the expanded electoral franchise. Malaysia does not currently practice compulsory voting. The Election Commission is under the jurisdiction of the Prime Minister's Department.

In late 2022, several news outlets and publishing companies began launching apps and websites to announce the upcoming GE15 results and news.

== Timeline ==
=== Dissolution of parliament ===
The 14th Parliament of Malaysia was dissolved on 10 October 2022, during a special televised address by Prime Minister Ismail Sabri Yaakob, following an audience with the Yang di-Pertuan Agong, Abdullah, a day prior, whereby he provided consent for the dissolution. The election had to be held within 60 days or by 9 December.

The Constitution of Malaysia requires that a general election be held in the fifth calendar year after the first sitting unless it is dissolved earlier by the Yang di-Pertuan Agong following a motion of no confidence, loss of supply or a request by the prime minister.

=== Dissolution of state legislatures ===
While any state may dissolve its legislature independently of Parliament, most of them had historically dissolve at around the same time as Parliament such that federal and state elections are held simultaneously. In accordance with Malaysian law, Parliament as well as the legislative assemblies of each state would automatically expire on the fifth anniversary of the first sitting of a term, unless dissolved prior to that date by the relevant heads of state on the advice of their respective heads of government. Elections must be held within sixty days of expiry or dissolution.

Dates of the legislature of each state would expire and their actual dissolution dates
Legislature (and term number)	Term began	Refs	Term ends (on or before)	Latest possible election date	Actual dissolution date	Refs
Perlis (14th)	20 July 2018		20 July 2023	18 September 2023	14 October 2022	
Pahang (14th)	2 July 2018		2 July 2023	31 August 2023	14 October 2022	
Perak (14th)	3 July 2018		3 July 2023	1 September 2023	17 October 2022	
Selangor (14th)	26 June 2018		26 June 2023	25 August 2023	Not dissolving (Note: The lifting of the state of emergency in the Sabah seat of Bugaya (N66) on 12 October 2022 meant that a state by-election was held simultaneously with the federal election.)	
Kelantan (14th)	28 June 2018		28 June 2023	27 August 2023	Not dissolving	
Terengganu (14th)	1 July 2018		1 July 2023	30 August 2023	Not dissolving	
Negeri Sembilan (14th)	2 July 2018		2 July 2023	31 August 2023	Not dissolving	
Kedah (14th)	4 July 2018		4 July 2023	2 September 2023	Not dissolving	
Penang (14th)	2 August 2018		2 August 2023	1 October 2023	Not dissolving	
Sabah (16th)	9 October 2020		9 October 2025	8 December 2025	Not dissolving	
Malacca (15th)	27 December 2021		27 December 2026	25 February 2027	Not dissolving	
Sarawak (19th)	14 February 2022		14 February 2027	15 April 2027	Not dissolving	
Johor (15th)	21 April 2022		21 April 2027	20 June 2027	Not dissolving	

=== Pre-nomination events ===
On 17 October 2022, the Election Commission of Malaysia (SPR) updated the roster of 63 parties and coalitions eligible to contest in its own right. Independents are allowed to contest using symbols predefined by the SPR.

=== Timetable ===
The key dates are listed below
Dates	Events
10 October	Dissolution of parliament
20 October	Election Commission announcement of Election Day and its timeline
20 October	Issue of the Writ of Election
5 November	Nomination day
5–18 November	Campaigning period
15–18 November	Early polling day for postal and advance voters
19 November	Polling day (except P017 Padang Serai)
24 November	Inauguration of the new prime minister Anwar Ibrahim at Istana Negara
P017 Padang Serai
18 November	Issue of the Writ of Election for P017 Padang Serai
24 November	Nomination day
24 November – 6 December	Campaigning period
3 – 6 December	Early polling day for postal, overseas and advance voters
7 December	Polling day
P220 Baram
21 November	Polling day for remaining 11 polling stations

== Last election pendulum ==
(Results and status at 9 May 2018) The 14th general election witnessed 124 governmental seats and 98 non-governmental seats filled the Dewan Rakyat. The government side has 49 safe seats and 11 fairly safe seats, while the other side has 21 safe seats and 4 fairly safe seats.

GOVERNMENT SEATS
Marginal
Parit Buntar	Dr. Mujahid Yusof Rawa	AMANAH	39.22
Temerloh	Anuar Mohd. Tahir	AMANAH	39.31
Lubok Antu	Jugah Muyang @ Tambat	IND	40.09
Lumut	Dr. Mohd. Hatta Md. Ramli	AMANAH	40.93
Pokok Sena	Mahfuz Omar	AMANAH	40.93
Sungai Besar	Muslimin Yahya	BERSATU	42.11
Jerlun	Dr. Mukhriz Mahathir	BERSATU	42.55
Kulim-Bandar Baharu	Saifuddin Nasution Ismail	PKR	42.62
Merbok	Nurin Aina Abdullah	PKR	43.31
Tambun	Ahmad Faizal Azumu	BERSATU	44.46
Kuantan	Fuziah Salleh	PKR	44.57
Kuala Pilah	Eddin Syazlee Shith	BERSATU	44.85
Indera Mahkota	Saifuddin Abdullah	PKR	44.85
Raub	Tengku Zulpuri Shah Raja Puji	DAP	44.89
Kapar	Abdullah Sani Abdul Hamid	PKR	44.99
Ranau	Jonathan Yasin	PKR	45.17
Padang Serai	Karuppaiya Muthusamy	PKR	45.27
Tanjong Malim	Chang Lih Kang	PKR	45.44
Putatan	Awang Husaini Sahari	PKR	45.81
Kuala Kedah	Dr. Azman Ismail	PKR	46.26
Tampin	Hasan Bahrom	AMANAH	46.29
Bentong	Wong Tack	DAP	46.67
Kangar	Noor Amin Ahmad	PKR	46.80
Tangga Batu	Dr. Rusnah Aluai	PKR	46.89
Tanjung Piai	Dr. Md. Farid Md. Rafik	BERSATU	47.29
Titiwangsa	Rina Mohd. Harun	BERSATU	47.31
Hulu Selangor	June Leow Hsiad Hui	PKR	47.86
Papar	Ahmad Hassan	WARISAN	48.54
Sri Gading	Dr. Shahruddin Mohd. Salleh	BERSATU	48.58
Sungai Siput	Kesavan Subramaniam	PKR	48.72
Kuala Langat	Xavier Jayakumar Arulanandam	PKR	49.08
Sungai Petani	Johari Abdul	PKR	49.21
Kubang Pasu	Ir. Amiruddin Hamzah	BERSATU	49.70
Kuala Selangor	Dr. Dzulkefly Ahmad	AMANAH	49.98
Tawau	Christina Liew Chin Jin	PKR	50.05
Kalabakan	Ma'mun Sulaiman	WARISAN	50.09
Lembah Pantai	Ahmad Fahmi Mohamed Fadzil	PKR	50.24
Simpang Renggam	Dr. Maszlee Malik	BERSATU	50.69
Alor Gajah	Mohd. Redzuan Md. Yusof	BERSATU	50.73
Alor Setar	Chan Ming Kai	PKR	50.80
Kota Belud	Isnaraissah Munirah Majilis @ Fakharuddy	WARISAN	50.82
Permatang Pauh	Nurul Izzah Anwar	PKR	50.89
Hang Tuah Jaya	Shamsul Iskandar @ Yusre Mohd. Akin	PKR	51.01
Tenom	Noorita Sual	DAP	51.10
Selangau	Baru Bian	PKR	51.11
Balik Pulau	Muhammad Bakthiar Wan Chik	PKR	51.17
Sepang	Mohamed Hanipa Maidin	AMANAH	51.56
Sekijang	Natrah Ismail	PKR	51.69
Labis	Pang Hok Liong	DAP	52.17
Saratok	Ali Biju	PKR	52.18
Ledang	Syed Ibrahim Syed Noh	PKR	53.06
Segamat	Edmund Santhara Kumar Ramanaidu	PKR	53.09
Muar	Syed Saddiq Syed Abdul Rahman	BERSATU	53.09
Sarikei	Wong Ling Biu	DAP	53.57
Silam	Mohamaddin Ketapi	WARISAN	54.26
Teluk Intan	David Nga Kor Ming	DAP	54.37
Puncak Borneo	Willie Mongin	PKR	54.65
Langkawi	Dr. Mahathir Mohamad	BERSATU	54.90
Pagoh	Muhyiddin Mohd. Yassin	BERSATU	55.21
Julau	Larry Soon @ Larry S'ng Wei Shien	IND	55.28
Hulu Langat	Hasanuddin Mohd. Yunus	AMANAH	55.53
Batu Sapi	Liew Vui Keong	WARISAN	55.78
Batu Pahat	Mohd. Rashid Hasnon	PKR	55.92
Sungai Buloh	Sivarasa K. Rasiah	PKR	55.97
Fairly safe
Setiawangsa	Nik Nazmi Nik Ahmad	PKR	56.65
Mas Gading	Mordi Bimol	DAP	56.71
Nibong Tebal	Mansor Othman	PKR	56.92
Wangsa Maju	Dr. Tan Yee Kew	PKR	57.30
Kampar	Thomas Su Keong Siong	DAP	57.56
Bandar Tun Razak	Kamarudin Jaffar	PKR	58.58
Pasir Gudang	Hassan Abdul Karim	PKR	58.68
Port Dickson	Danyal Balagopal Abdullah	PKR	59.06
Kluang	Wong Shu Qi	DAP	59.20
Sepanggar	Mohd. Azis Jamman	WARISAN	59.47
Sibu	Oscar Ling Chai Yew	DAP	59.58
Safe
Shah Alam	Khalid Abdul Samad	AMANAH	60.00
Seremban	Anthony Loke Siew Fook	DAP	60.45
Batu	Prabakaran M. Parameswaran	PKR	60.70
Selayang	William Leong Jee Keen	PKR	61.38
Taiping	Teh Kok Lim	DAP	61.65
Gopeng	Dr. Lee Boon Chye	PKR	61.75
Miri	Dr. Michael Teo Yu Keng	PKR	61.82
Tebrau	Choong Shiau Yoon	PKR	62.09
Johor Bahru	Akmal Nasrullah Mohd. Nasir	PKR	62.31
Bakri	Yeo Bee Yin	DAP	62.65
Gombak	Mohamed Azmin Ali	PKR	63.10
Stampin	Chong Chieng Jen	DAP	63.70
Pulai	Salahuddin Ayub	AMANAH	63.81
Lanang	Alice Lau Yiong Kieng	DAP	65.16
Kulai	Teo Nie Ching	DAP	65.42
Bangi	Dr. Ong Kian Ming	DAP	65.60
Sandakan	Stephen Wong Tien Fatt	DAP	67.97
Beruas	James Ngeh Koo Ham	DAP	68.41
Petaling Jaya	Maria Chin Abdullah	PKR	68.52
Bayan Baru	Sim Tze Tzin	PKR	68.88
Iskandar Puteri	Lim Kit Siang	DAP	69.24
Kota Raja	Mohamad Sabu	AMANAH	70.79
Ampang	Zuraida Kamaruddin	PKR	70.94
Puchong	Gobind Singh Deo	DAP	72.39
Rasah	Cha Kee Chin	DAP	72.45
Kota Melaka	Khoo Poay Tiong	DAP	72.68
Kota Kinabalu	Chan Foong Hin	DAP	74.76
Penampang	Ignatius Dorell @ Darell Leiking	WARISAN	75.32
Pandan	Dr. Wan Azizah Wan Ismail	PKR	75.47
Klang	Charles Anthony R. Santiago	DAP	77.34
Batu Kawan	Kasthuriraani P. Patto	DAP	78.02
Bandar Kuching	Dr. Kelvin Yii Lee Wuen	DAP	79.43
Jelutong	Sanisvara Nethaji Rayer Rajaji	DAP	79.63
Semporna	Mohd. Shafie Apdal	WARISAN	80.20
Ipoh Timor	Wong Kah Woh	DAP	80.46
Segambut	Hannah Yeoh Tseow Suan	DAP	82.07
Subang	Wong Chen	PKR	83.08
Bukit Bendera	Wong Hon Wai	DAP	83.83
Batu Gajah	Sivakumar M. Varatharaju Naidu	DAP	84.17
Ipoh Barat	Kulasegaran V. Murugeson	DAP	84.90
Bukit Bintang	Fong Kui Lun	DAP	84.94
Bukit Mertajam	Steven Sim Chee Keong	DAP	85.40
Bagan	Lim Guan Eng	DAP	85.96
Bukit Gelugor	Ramkarpal Singh	DAP	86.68
Tanjong	Chow Kon Yeow	DAP	87.25
Damansara	Tony Pua Kiam Wee	DAP	89.00
Cheras	Tan Kok Wai	DAP	89.00
Seputeh	Teresa Kok Suh Sim	DAP	89.97
Kepong	Lim Lip Eng	DAP	92.04

NON-GOVERNMENT SEATS
Marginal
Keningau	Dr. Jeffrey Gapari @ Geoffrey Kitingan	STAR	33.09
Jerai	Sabri Azit	PAS	33.94
Tasek Gelugor	Shabudin Yahaya	UMNO	35.73
Bagan Serai	Dr. Noor Azmi Ghazali	UMNO	36.44
Kota Marudu	Dr. Maximus Johnity Ongkili	PBS	38.44
Sabak Bernam	Mohamad Fasiah Mohd. Fakeh	UMNO	38.57
Bukit Gantang	Syed Abu Hussin Hafiz Syed Abdul Fasal	UMNO	39.48
Kuala Kangsar	Mastura Mohd. Yazid	UMNO	40.26
Padang Besar	Zahidi Zainul Abidin	UMNO	41.18
Padang Rengas	Mohamed Nazri Abdul Aziz	UMNO	41.50
Beaufort	Azizah Mohd. Dun	UMNO	41.72
Arau	Dr. Shahidan Kassim	UMNO	41.79
Padang Terap	Mahdzir Khalid	UMNO	42.09
Kota Bharu	Takiyuddin Hassan	PAS	42.24
Cameron Highlands	Sivarajjh Chandran	MIC	42.30
Baling	Abdul Azeez Abdul Rahim	UMNO	42.60
Pendang	Awang Hashim	PAS	42.69
Kepala Batas	Reezal Merican Naina Merican	UMNO	42.94
Jasin	Ahmad Hamzah	UMNO	43.00
Paya Besar	Mohd. Shahar Abdullah	UMNO	43.16
Tanjong Karang	Noh Omar	UMNO	43.45
Bera	Ismail Sabri Yaakob	UMNO	43.89
Ayer Hitam	Dr. Ir. Wee Ka Siong	MCA	43.98
Kemaman	Che Alias Hamid	PAS	44.06
Tapah	Saravanan Murugan	MIC	44.47
Jerantut	Ahmad Nazlan Idris	UMNO	45.06
Larut	Hamzah Zainudin	UMNO	45.90
Pasir Salak	Tajuddin Abd Rahman	UMNO	46.04
Pontian	Ahmad Maslan	UMNO	46.21
Jempol	Mohd. Salim Shariff	UMNO	46.83
Kuala Krau	Dr. Ismail Mohamed Said	UMNO	47.14
Machang	Ahmad Jazlan Yaakub	UMNO	47.39
Pasir Puteh	Dr. Nik Muhammad Zawawi Salleh	PAS	47.41
Labuan	Rozman Isli	UMNO	47.59
Kimanis	Anifah Aman	UMNO	47.71
Sik	Ahmad Tarmizi Sulaiman	PAS	47.91
Ketereh	Annuar Musa	UMNO	47.95
Pensiangan	Arthur Joseph Kurup	PBRS	48.35
Besut	Idris Jusoh	UMNO	48.40
Parit	Mohd. Nizar Zakaria	UMNO	48.41
Tanah Merah	Ikmal Hisham Abdul Aziz	UMNO	48.44
Gerik	Hasbullah Osman	UMNO	48.49
Sipitang	Yamani Hafez Musa	UMNO	48.60
Gua Musang	Tengku Razaleigh Tengku Mohd. Hamzah	UMNO	48.64
Setiu	Shaharizukirnain Abd. Kadir	PAS	48.65
Rembau	Khairy Jamaluddin Abu Bakar	UMNO	48.87
Jelebu	Jalaluddin Alias	UMNO	48.93
Bachok	Nik Mohamed Abduh Nik Abdul Aziz	PAS	48.93
Maran	Dr. Ismail Abdul Muttalib	UMNO	49.09
Parit Sulong	Dr. Noraini Ahmad	UMNO	49.19
Libaran	Zakaria Mohd. Edris @ Tubau	UMNO	49.25
Putrajaya	Tengku Adnan Tengku Mansor	UMNO	49.47
Hulu Terengganu	Rosol Wahid	UMNO	49.60
Kuala Terengganu	Ahmad Amzad Mohamed @ Hashim	PAS	49.65
Lipis	Abdul Rahman Mohamad	UMNO	49.82
Kudat	Abd Rahim Bakri	UMNO	49.90
Rantau Panjang	Siti Zailah Mohd. Yusoff	PAS	50.82
Bagan Datuk	Dr. Ahmad Zahid Hamidi	UMNO	51.37
Tuaran	Wilfred Madius Tangau	UPKO	51.54
Pasir Mas	Ahmad Fadhli Shaari	PAS	52.44
Kuala Krai	Ab. Latiff Ab. Rahman	PAS	52.56
Kuala Nerus	Dr. Mohd. Khairuddin Aman Razali	PAS	52.66
Mersing	Dr. Abd. Latiff Ahmad	UMNO	53.00
Rompin	Hasan Arifin	UMNO	53.54
Lenggong	Dr. Shamsul Anuar Nasarah	UMNO	53.97
Masjid Tanah	Mas Ermieyati Samsudin	UMNO	54.10
Dungun	Wan Hassan Mohd. Ramli	PAS	54.17
Tumpat	Che Abdullah Mat Nawi	PAS	54.33
Tenggara	Dr. Adham Baba	UMNO	54.39
Baram	Anyi Ngau	PDP	54.45
Sibuti	Lukanisman Awang Sauni	PBB	54.60
Pengkalan Chepa	Ahmad Marzuk Shaary	PAS	54.88
Jeli	Mustapa Mohamed	UMNO	55.89
Fairly safe
Kubang Kerian	Tuan Ibrahim Tuan Man	PAS	56.16
Bintulu	Tiong King Sing	PDP	57.05
Sembrong	Hishammuddin Hussein	UMNO	59.24
Marang	Abd Hadi Awang	PAS	59.27
Safe
Betong	Robert Lawson Chuat Vincent Entering	PBB	60.41
Sri Aman	Masir Kujat	PSB	61.48
Pekan	Mohd. Najib Abdul Razak	UMNO	62.19
Beluran	Dr. Ronald Kiandee	UMNO	62.84
Serian	Richard Riot Jaem	SUPP	63.99
Kanowit	Aaron Ago Dagang	PRS	64.58
Petra Jaya	Fadillah Yusof	PBB	65.91
Mukah	Hanifah Hajar Taib	PBB	66.90
Kinabatangan	Bung Moktar Radin	UMNO	67.22
Pengerang	Azalina Othman Said	UMNO	67.71
Hulu Rajang	Wilson Ugak Kumbong	PRS	68.20
Kota Tinggi	Halimah Mohamed Sadique	UMNO	69.14
Kota Samarahan	Rubiah Wang	PBB	69.90
Lawas	Henry Sum Agong	PBB	70.44
Batang Lupar	Rohani Abdul Karim	PBB	70.49
Limbang	Hasbi Habibollah	PBB	72.07
Kapit	Alexander Nanta Linggi	PBB	78.91
Santubong	Dr. Wan Junaidi Tuanku Jaafar	PBB	79.28
Tanjong Manis	Yusuf Abd. Wahab	PBB	80.69
Batang Sadong	Nancy Shukri	PBB	83.25
Igan	Ahmad Johnie Zawawi	PBB	83.76

== Political parties and candidates ==
The election saw numerous changes in seats from all political sides, with candidates either announced to be departing from their original constituencies to contest in another constituency, or several high-profile members of parliament being dropped from selection. Those who were dropped or not selected however went on to contest as independent candidates or in opposing parties to defend their seats or seek re-election, resulting in their memberships dropped.

UMNO deputy president Mohamad Hasan announced his intention to contest the Rembau seat, replacing incumbent Khairy Jamaluddin, who was expected to be fielded in an opposition-majority seat, which eventually turned out to be Sungai Buloh, one of the seats that has been a PKR stronghold. In addition, several high-profile incumbent UMNO MPs, including Shahidan Kassim, Annuar Musa and Tajuddin Abdul Rahman, were dropped from contesting following rumors after they were believed to be supporting Ismail Sabri instead of Zahid Hamidi. Among those dropped, Zahidi Zainul Abidin, the incumbent Padang Besar MP, contested as an independent while Shahidan contested to defend his Arau seat under the Perikatan banner, resulting in both their and several others' memberships dropped. In a similar move, incumbent PAS Tumpat MP Che Abdullah Mat Nawi contested to defend his seat under the BN ticket after he was dropped from the candidates' list, resulting in him expelled from PAS.

A few of the more notable changes in PKR were Anwar's decision to contest in the Tambun parliamentary seat, with Wan Azizah Wan Ismail contesting the Bandar Tun Razak seat, as part of PKR's plan to field high-ranking members in seats previously held by defected party members. One of the most anticipated seats, Gombak, saw Selangor's Menteri Besar Amirudin Shari nominated as PH candidate to face incumbent Azmin Ali, who was one of the key ringleaders of the ongoing political crisis. PKR also announced several other high-profile direct candidates to contest under the PH banner. Former Batu MP Tian Chua, who was not selected to contest in favor of incumbent Prabakaran Parameswaran, sought to seek re-election by contesting as an independent candidate for his seat, leading to his expulsion from the party.

Meanwhile, DAP had dropped two of its incumbent MPs, Charles Santiago and Wong Tack from their respective parliamentary seats, in place of younger candidates, leading both to question the party's reasoning behind their droppings, with Wong later announcing his intention to defend his seat as an independent candidate, thus also resulting in his expulsion from the party.

On 16 November, Padang Serai's incumbent MP Karupaiya Mutusami died three days before the election. This marked the third time in Malaysian election history that a nominated candidate died in between nomination and polling dates. The Election Commission announced that polling for Padang Serai would take place on 7 December following a meeting on Friday (18 November), a day before the elections, after polling for the constituency was postponed. Subsequently, PN candidate for the Tioman state seat in Pahang, Yunus Ramli died hours before polling was due to begin on 19 November. The election for the state seat was also postponed to the same date with Padang Serai.

=== Parties represented in current legislatures ===
The election would be the first time Pakatan Harapan, Gabungan Parti Sarawak, Gabungan Rakyat Sabah and Perikatan Nasional use their own respective logos.

DAP announced their intention to use the PH logo for West Malaysia seats on 14 November 2021, while they would continue to use their own logo in Sarawak as they did in the previous election and also in the recent state election. However, DAP stated that they would be joining other PH parties in using the PH logo in Sabah, in contrast to using their own logo in the previous election, the 2019 Sandakan by-election and using then-ally Warisan's logo in the 2020 Sabah state election. In September 2022, Pakatan formally decided to consider applications by MUDA and the Socialist Party of Malaysia (PSM) to contest under its name. Pakatan chairman Anwar Ibrahim later stated that the coalition would form an electoral pact with the two parties, citing that the application process would need to go through the Registrar of Societies. However, on 30 October, PSM announced that they ended their pact with PH, after they were denied being allocated seats for the election, in particular Sungai Siput where chairman Michael Jeyakumar Devaraj served two terms but was similarly allocated to PKR in 2018. Therefore, PSM decided to contest alone on 2 November 2022

PN component parties in Pahang (Bersatu, PAS, Gerakan) decided to contest on all parliamentary and state assembly seats there on 28 November 2021. The Malaysian Islamic Party (PAS), despite being in the PN coalition, announced that they would be contesting using their own logo in Kelantan, Terengganu and Kedah along with other PN candidates in these three predominant Malay/Muslim states. The move was met with objection from GERAKAN, as their policy was to not contest under other party's logo. Some of PN component parties are also part of Gabungan Rakyat Sabah, who intended to use GRS logo in Sabah. Parti Kesejahteraan Demokratik Masyarakat (KDM), a GRS-friendly party initiated by former Warisan Party members, sought to contest at least three seats in Sabah independently.

In August 2022, Pejuang formed a Malay/Muslim-based coalition called as Gerakan Tanah Air (GTA) with 4 other parties (Berjasa, Putra, Gagasan Bangsa and IMAN) and planned to contest 120 parliamentary seats. Mahathir, who initially hesitated to contest until he changed his mind to defend his Langkawi seat, announced that GTA would be contesting under the Pejuang logo, while GTA contestants in Kelantan contested using the logo of Parti Bumiputera Perkasa Malaysia (PUTRA), as the coalition's registration was still pending.

Barisan Nasional contested all parliamentary seats outside Sarawak, while respecting Sabah state liaison office's intention to cooperate with Gabungan Rakyat Sabah. On 11 December 2021, PBRS announced that they would contest 3 seats in Sabah under Barisan Nasional. In April 2022, UMNO's Supreme Council proposed that Prime Minister Ismail Sabri Yaakob be its Prime Ministerial candidate for GE15. Zahid Hamidi, chairman of Barisan Nasional, has officially considered to accept Makkal Sakti's request to contest the election under Barisan Nasional logo on 19 September 2021. The offer was extended to other Friends of BN parties by June 2022. Gabungan Parti Sarawak, whose component parties were part of BN in 2018 election, formulated its election program and competed independently. GPS postponed any coalition and government formation talks until after election and claimed to maintain the status quo of seat allocation.

In this election, the Heritage Party (WARISAN), previously an ally of Pakatan Harapan in the 2018 general election, for the first time contested outside Sabah. As part of the move, it intended on 24 January 2021 to contest all parliamentary and assembly seats in Penang and considered to run in other states.

=== Extra-parliamentary parties ===
On 15 December 2021, a group of independent activists calling themselves Gerak Independent announced their intention to run in the election in no more than 10 seats. Parti Bumi Kenyalang (PBK) initially intended to contest all 31 parliamentary seats in Sarawak on 26 January 2022, claiming that it already made ties with unspecified Sabah based party and still opened possibility of cooperating with other Sarawak-only parties. By June 2022 PBK made negotiations with Sarawakian local opposition parties such as PSB, Aspirasi, PBDS (Baru) and SEDAR to avoid clashes in the election without formally forming a coalition. The negotiation produced a cooperation pact between PSB, PBK and PBDS, with PBK contesting mostly under PSB's logo. In June 2022 SEDAR announced their intention to contest in Malay/Muslim (and Melanau)-majority of Sarawak seats.

Parti Rakyat Malaysia announced their intention to contest parliamentary seats in Penang respectively on 15 October 2022. PRM later stated that it would contest 28 parliament and 1 state seats nationally, in cooperation with GERAK 98 NGO.

Parti Cinta Sabah, Penang Front Party and Sarawak People's Aspiration Party initially declared to their intention to participate but ended up not fielding any candidates.

=== Nominated candidates ===
The election saw a record 945 candidates contesting in all 222 parliamentary seats nationwide, among them a record 108 independent candidates.

State	No.	Constituency	Number of voters	Incumbent Member of Parliament	Incumbent Coalition (Party)	Political coalitions and respective candidates and parties																			
State	No.	Constituency	Number of voters	Incumbent Member of Parliament	Incumbent Coalition (Party)	Barisan Nasional		Pakatan Harapan + MUDA		Perikatan Nasional		Gabungan Parti Sarawak		Gabungan Rakyat Sabah		Gerakan Tanah Air (informal coalition)		Other parties/Independents							
State	No.	Constituency	Number of voters	Incumbent Member of Parliament	Incumbent Coalition (Party)	Candidate name	Party	Candidate name	Party	Candidate name	Party	Candidate name	Party	Candidate name	Party	Candidate name	Party	Candidate name	Party	Candidate name	Party	Candidate name	Party	Candidate name	Party
Perlis	P001	Padang Besar	60,192	Zahidi Zainul Abidin	BN (UMNO)	Zahida Zarik Khan	UMNO	Mohamad Saad @ Yahaya	AMANAH	Rushdan Rusmi	PAS							Ko Chu Liang	WARISAN	Zahidi Zainul Abidin	IND				
Perlis	P002	Kangar	74,859	Noor Amin Ahmad	PH (PKR)	Fathul Bari Mat Jahya	UMNO	Noor Amin Ahmad	PKR	Zakri Hassan	BERSATU					Nur Sulaiman Zolkapli	PEJUANG	Rohimi Shapiee	WARISAN						
Perlis	P003	Arau	60,876	Shahidan Kassim	BN (UMNO)	Rozabil Abd Rahman	UMNO	Fathin Amelina Fazlie	PKR	Shahidan Kassim	PAS														
Kedah	P004	Langkawi	66,777	Mahathir Mohamad	GTA (PEJUANG)	Armishah Siraj	UMNO	Zabidi Yahya	AMANAH	Mohd Suhaimi Abdullah	BERSATU					Mahathir Mohamad	PEJUANG	Abd Kadir Sainuddin	IND						
Kedah	P005	Jerlun	67,601	Mukhriz Mahathir	GTA (PEJUANG)	Othman Aziz	UMNO	Mohamed Fadzil Mohd Ali	PKR	Abdul Ghani Ahmad	PAS					Mukhriz Mahathir	PEJUANG								
Kedah	P006	Kubang Pasu	108,217	Amiruddin Hamzah	GTA (PEJUANG)	Hasmuni Hassan	UMNO	Mohd Aizuddin Ariffin	PKR	Ku Abdul Rahman Ku Ismail	BERSATU					Amiruddin Hamzah	PEJUANG								
Kedah	P007	Padang Terap	59,806	Mahdzir Khalid	BN (UMNO)	Mahdzir Khalid	UMNO	Muaz Abdullah	AMANAH	Nurul Amin Hamid	PAS					Razali Lebai Salleh	PEJUANG								
Kedah	P008	Pokok Sena	114,838	Mahfuz Omar	PH (AMANAH)	Noran Zamini Jamaluddin	UMNO	Mahfuz Omar	AMANAH	Ahmad Saad @ Yahaya	PAS							Noraini Md Salleh	WARISAN						
Kedah	P009	Alor Setar	105,994	Chan Ming Kai	PH (PKR)	Tan Chee Hiong	MCA	Simon Ooi Tze Min	PKR	Afnan Hamimi Taib Azamudden	PAS					Mohamad Nuhairi Rahmat	PEJUANG	Fadzli Hanafi	WARISAN	Nordin Yunus	IND	Sofan Feroza Md Yusup	IND		
Kedah	P010	Kuala Kedah	132,500	Azman Ismail	PH (PKR)	Mashitah Ibrahim	UMNO	Azman Ismail	PKR	Ahmad Fakhruddin Fakhrurazi	PAS					Ulya Aqamah Husamudin	PEJUANG	Syed Araniri Syed Ahmad	WARISAN						
Kedah	P011	Pendang	94,547	Awang Hashim	PN (PAS)	Suraya Yaacob	UMNO	Zulkifly Mohamad	PKR	Awang Hashim	PAS					Abdul Rashid Yob	GB								
Kedah	P012	Jerai	105,001	Sabri Azit	PN (PAS)	Jamil Khir Baharom	UMNO	Zulhazmi Shariff	DAP	Sabri Azit	PAS					Mohd Nizam Mahshar	GB								
Kedah	P013	Sik	63,126	Ahmad Tarmizi Sulaiman	PN (PAS)	Maizatul Akmam Othman @ Ibrahim	UMNO	Latifah Mohammad Yatim	AMANAH	Ahmad Tarmizi Sulaiman	PAS														
Kedah	P014	Merbok	132,444	Nor Azrina Surip	PH (PKR)	Shaiful Hazizy Zainol Abidin	UMNO	Nor Azrina Surip	PKR	Mohd Nazri Abu Hassan	BERSATU					Mohamed Mohsin Abdul Razak	IMAN	Khairul Anuar Ahmad	WARISAN						
Kedah	P015	Sungai Petani	168,847	Johari Abdul	PH (PKR)	Shahanim Mohamad Yusoff	UMNO	Mohammed Taufiq Johari	PKR	Robert Ling Kui Ee	BERSATU					Marzuki Yahya	PEJUANG	Tan Joon Long @ Tan Chow Kang	PRM						
Kedah	P016	Baling	132,099	Abdul Azeez Abdul Rahim	BN (UMNO)	Abdul Azeez Abdul Rahim	UMNO	Johari Abdullah	AMANAH	Hassan Saad	PAS					Bashir Abdul Rahman	PUTRA								
Kedah	P017	Padang Serai	133,867	Karupaiya Mutusami (died)	PH (PKR)	Sivarraajh Chandran	MIC	Mohamad Sofee Razak	PKR	Azman Nasrudin	BERSATU					Hamzah Abdul Rahman	PUTRA	Mohd Bakri Hashim	WARISAN	Sreanandha Rao	IND				
Kedah	P018	Kulim-Bandar Baharu	90,141	Saifuddin Nasution Ismail	PH (PKR)	Muhar Hussain	UMNO	Saifuddin Nasution Ismail	PKR	Roslan Hashim	BERSATU					Mohamad Yusrizal Yusoff	GB								
Kelantan	P019	Tumpat	149,371	Che Abdullah Mat Nawi	PN (PAS)	Che Abdullah Mat Nawi	BN	Wan Ahmad Johari Wan Omar	AMANAH	Mumtaz Md. Nawi	PAS					Che Mohamad Aswari Che Ali	PUTRA	Khairul Azuan Kamarrudin	WARISAN						
Kelantan	P020	Pengkalan Chepa	106,982	Ahmad Marzuk Shaary	PN (PAS)	Mohd Hafiezulniezam Mohd Hasdin	UMNO	Nik Faizah Nik Othman	AMANAH	Ahmad Marzuk Shaary	PAS					Wan Ahmad Nasri Wan Ismail	PEJUANG	Mohamad Redzuan Razali	IND						
Kelantan	P021	Kota Bharu	115,450	Takiyuddin Hassan	PN (PAS)	Rosmadi Ismail	UMNO	Hafidzah Mustakim	AMANAH	Takiyuddin Hassan	PAS					Che Musa Che Omar	PUTRA	Andy Tan @ Awang	PRM	Izat Bukhary	IND				
Kelantan	P022	Pasir Mas	94,544	Ahmad Fadhli Shaari	PN (PAS)	Abdul Ghani Harun	UMNO	Husam Musa	PKR	Ahmad Fadhli Shaari	PAS					Nasrul Ali Hassan Abdul Latif	PUTRA								
Kelantan	P023	Rantau Panjang	93,248	Siti Zailah Mohd Yusoff	PN (PAS)	Zulkarnain Yusoff	UMNO	Wan Shah Jihan Wan Din	AMANAH	Siti Zailah Mohd Yusoff	PAS					Ibrahim Ali	PUTRA	Mohd Zain Ismail	PRM						
Kelantan	P024	Kubang Kerian	113,640	Tuan Ibrahim Tuan Man	PN (PAS)	Nurul Amal Mohd Fauzi	UMNO	Wan Ahmad Kamil Wan Abdullah	AMANAH	Tuan Ibrahim Tuan Man	PAS					Mohamad Rizal Razali	PEJUANG								
Kelantan	P025	Bachok	123,183	Nik Mohamed Abduh Nik Abdul Aziz	PN (PAS)	Mohd Zain Yasim	UMNO	Nur Azmiza Mamat	PKR	Mohd Syahir Che Sulaiman	PAS					Kamarul Azam Abdel Osman	PUTRA	Mohd Zulkifli Zakaria	IND						
Kelantan	P026	Ketereh	85,281	Annuar Musa	BN (UMNO)	Marzuani Ardila Ariffin	UMNO	Rahimi L Muhamud	PKR	Khlir Mohd Nor	BERSATU					Hanif Ibrahim	PUTRA								
Kelantan	P027	Tanah Merah	98,782	Ikmal Hisham Abdul Aziz	PN (BERSATU)	Bakri @ Mohd Bakri Mustapha	UMNO	Mohamad Supardi Md Noor	PKR	Ikmal Hisham Abdul Aziz	BERSATU					Mohd Nasir Abdullah	PUTRA	Nik Sapeia Nik Yusoff	IND						
Kelantan	P028	Pasir Puteh	113,070	Nik Muhammad Zawawi Salleh	PN (PAS)	Zawawi Othman	UMNO	Muhammad Husin	AMANAH	Nik Muhammad Zawawi Salleh	PAS					Wan Marzudi Wan Umar	PEJUANG								
Kelantan	P029	Machang	88,825	Ahmad Jazlan Yaakub	BN (UMNO)	Ahmad Jazlan Yaakub	UMNO	Rosli Allani Abdul Kadir	PKR	Wan Ahmad Fayhsal Wan Ahmad Kamal	BERSATU					Mohammad Seman	PUTRA								
Kelantan	P030	Jeli	59,798	Mustapa Mohamed	PN (BERSATU)	Norwahida Patuan	UMNO	Md Radzi Wahab	AMANAH	Zahari Kechik	BERSATU					Mohammad Daud	PUTRA								
Kelantan	P031	Kuala Krai	92,335	Ab Latiff Ab Rahman	PN (PAS)	Mohamed Zulkepli Omar	UMNO	Mohd Hisyamuddin Ghazali	AMANAH	Abdul Latiff Abdul Rahman	PAS					Norashikin Che Umar	PEJUANG								
Kelantan	P032	Gua Musang	70,254	Tengku Razaleigh Hamzah	BN (UMNO)	Tengku Razaleigh Hamzah	UMNO	Asharun Uji	PKR	Mohd Azizi Abu Naim	BERSATU					Samsu Adabi Mamat	PEJUANG								
Terengganu	P033	Besut	111,650	Idris Jusoh	BN (UMNO)	Nawi Mohamad	UMNO	Abd Rahman @ Abd Aziz Abas	AMANAH	Che Mohamad Zulkifly Jusoh	PAS					Wan Nazari Wan Jusoh	PEJUANG								
Terengganu	P034	Setiu	107,294	Shaharizukirnain Abd. Kadir	PN (PAS)	Abdul Rahman Mat Yasin	UMNO	Mohamad Ngah	PKR	Shaharizukirnain Abdul Kadir	PAS					Wan Adnan Wan Ali	PEJUANG								
Terengganu	P035	Kuala Nerus	105,952	Mohd Khairuddin Aman Razali	IND	Mohd Khairuddin Aman Razali	BN	Suhaimi Hashim	AMANAH	Alias Razak	PAS					Azahar Wahid	PUTRA								
Terengganu	P036	Kuala Terengganu	123,305	Ahmad Amzad Mohamed @ Hashim	PN (PAS)	Mohd Zubir Embong	UMNO	Raja Kamarul Bahrin Shah Raja Ahmad	AMANAH	Ahmad Amzad Mohamed @ Hashim	PAS					Mohamad Abu Bakar Muda	PUTRA								
Terengganu	P037	Marang	131,756	Abdul Hadi Awang	PN (PAS)	Jasmira Othman	UMNO	Azhar Abdul Shukur	AMANAH	Abdul Hadi Awang	PAS					Zarawi Sulong	PUTRA								
Terengganu	P038	Hulu Terengganu	87,917	Rosol Wahid	PN (BERSATU)	Rozi Mamat	UMNO	Alias Ismail	PKR	Rosol Wahid	BERSATU					Mohd. Khadri Abdullah	PUTRA								
Terengganu	P039	Dungun	115,559	Wan Hassan Mohd Ramli	PN (PAS)	Nurhisam Johari	UMNO	Mohasdjone @ Mohd Johari Mohamad	PKR	Wan Hassan Mohd Ramli	PAS					Noraisah Hasan	PEJUANG	Ghazali Ismail	IND						
Terengganu	P040	Kemaman	139,423	Che Alias Hamid	PN (PAS)	Ahmad Said	UMNO	Hasuni Sudin	PKR	Che Alias Hamid	PAS					Rosli Abd Ghani	PEJUANG								
Pulau Pinang	P041	Kepala Batas	83,081	Reezal Merican Naina Merican	BN (UMNO)	Reezal Merican Naina Merican	UMNO	Muhammad Danial Abdul Majeed	MUDA	Siti Mastura Mohamad	PAS					Hamidi Abu Hassan	BERJASA|								
Pulau Pinang	P042	Tasek Gelugor	80,868	Shabudin Yahaya	PN (BERSATU)	Muhamad Yusoff Mohd Noor	UMNO	Nik Abdul Razak Nik Md Ridzuan	AMANAH	Wan Saifulruddin Wan Jan	BERSATU					Abdul Halim Sher Jung	GB	Mohamed Akmal Azhar	WARISAN						
Pulau Pinang	P043	Bagan	89,447	Lim Guan Eng	PH (DAP)	Tan Chuan Hong	MCA	Lim Guan Eng	DAP	Alan Oh @ Oh Teik Choon	BERSATU					Mohammed Hafiz Mohamed Abu Bakar	IMAN								
Pulau Pinang	P044	Permatang Pauh	107,186	Nurul Izzah Anwar	PH (PKR)	Mohd Zaidi Mohd Zaid	UMNO	Nurul Izzah Anwar	PKR	Muhammad Fawwaz Mat Jan	PAS					Mohamad Nasir Osman	PUTRA								
Pulau Pinang	P045	Bukit Mertajam	120,819	Steven Sim Chee Keong	PH (DAP)	Tan Yang Pang	MCA	Steven Sim Chee Keong	DAP	Steven Koh Tien Yew	PAS														
Pulau Pinang	P046	Batu Kawan	88,812	Kasthuriraani Patto	PH (DAP)	Tan Lee Huat	MCA	Chow Kon Yeow	DAP	Wong Chia Zen	GERAKAN							Ong Chin Wen	WARISAN	Lee Ah Liang	PRM				
Pulau Pinang	P047	Nibong Tebal	100,062	Mansor Othman	PN (BERSATU)	Thanenthiran Ramankutty	MMSP	Fadhlina Sidek	PKR	Mansor Othman	BERSATU							Goh Kheng Huat	IND						
Pulau Pinang	P048	Bukit Bendera	92,521	Wong Hon Wai	PH (DAP)	Richie Huan Xin Yun	PCM	Syerleena Abdul Rashid	DAP	Hng Chee Wey	GERAKAN							Teh Yee Cheu	PRM	Razalif Mohd Zain	IND				
Pulau Pinang	P049	Tanjong	52,803	Chow Kon Yeow	PH (DAP)	Tan Kim Nee	MCA	Lim Hui Ying	DAP	H'ng Khoon Leng	GERAKAN														
Pulau Pinang	P050	Jelutong	93,989	Sanisvara Nethaji Rayer Rajaji Rayer	PH (DAP)	Loganathan Thoraisamy	IPF	Sanisvara Nethaji Rayer Rajaji Rayer	DAP	Baljit Singh Jigiri Singh	GERAKAN							Martin Lim Huat Poh	WARISAN	Koh Swe Yong	PRM	Mohamed Yacoob Mohamed Noor	IND		
Pulau Pinang	P051	Bukit Gelugor	117,134	Ramkarpal Singh	PH (DAP)	Wong Chin Chong	MCA	Ramkarpal Singh	DAP	Thinaganarabhan Padmanabhan	BERSATU														
Pulau Pinang	P052	Bayan Baru	119,640	Sim Tze Tzin	PH (PKR)	Saw Yee Fung	MCA	Sim Tze Tzin	PKR	Oh Tong Keong	GERAKAN							Jeff Ooi Chuan Aun	WARISAN	Ravinder Singh	PRM	Kan Chee Yuen	IND		
Pulau Pinang	P053	Balik Pulau	80,264	Muhammad Bakhtiar Wan Chik	PH (PKR)	Shah Headan Ayoob Hussain Shah	UMNO	Muhammad Bakhtiar Wan Chik	PKR	Muhammad Harris Idaham Abdul Rashid	BERSATU					Ahmad Fazli Mohammad	PEJUANG	Sabaruddin Ahmad	IND	Johnny Ch'ng Ewe Gee	IND				
Perak	P054	Gerik	47,565	Vacant	VAC	Asyraf Wajdi Dusuki	UMNO	Ahmad Tarmizi Mohd Jam	DAP	Fathul Huzir Ayob	BERSATU														
Perak	P055	Lenggong	36,950	Shamsul Anuar Nasarah	BN (UMNO)	Shamsul Anuar Nasarah	UMNO	Jurey Latiff Mohd Rosli	PKR	Muhammad Rif'aat Razman	PAS														
Perak	P056	Larut	65,719	Hamzah Zainudin	PN (BERSATU)	Mohd Shafiq Fhadly Mahmud	UMNO	Zolkarnain Abidin	AMANAH	Hamzah Zainudin	BERSATU					Auzaie Fadzlan Shahidi	BERJASA								
Perak	P057	Parit Buntar	68,502	Mujahid Yusof Rawa	PH (AMANAH)	Imran Mohd Yusof	UMNO	Mujahid Yusof Rawa	AMANAH	Mohd Misbahul Munir Masduki	PAS					Rohijas Md Sharif	PEJUANG								
Perak	P058	Bagan Serai	80,293	Noor Azmi Ghazali	PN (BERSATU)	Zul Helmi Ghazali	UMNO	Siti Aishah Shaik Ismail	PKR	Idris Ahmad	PAS					Ahmad Luqman Ahmad Yahaya	PEJUANG								
Perak	P059	Bukit Gantang	94,253	Syed Abu Hussin Hafiz Syed Abdul Fasal	PN (BERSATU)	Mohammad Sollehin Mohamad Tajie	UMNO	Fakhruldin Mohd Hashim	AMANAH	Syed Abu Hussin Hafiz Syed Abdul Fasal	BERSATU					Mohd Shukri Mohd Yusoff	PEJUANG								
Perak	P060	Taiping	121,566	Teh Kok Lim	PH (DAP)	Neow Choo Seong	MCA	Wong Kah Woh	DAP	See Tean Seng	GERAKAN							Leow Thye Yih	IND	Mohganan P Manikam	IND	A. Rama Moorthy @ Steven Ram	IND		
Perak	P061	Padang Rengas	38,686	Mohamed Nazri Abdul Aziz	BN (UMNO)	Mohd Arrif Abdul Majid	UMNO	Muhammad Kamil Abdul Munim	PKR	Azahari Hasan	BERSATU														
Perak	P062	Sungai Siput	72,395	Kesavan Subramaniam	PH (PKR)	Vigneswaran Sanasee	MIC	Kesavan Subramaniam	PKR	Irudhanathan Gabriel	BERSATU					Ahmad Fauzi Mohd Jaafar	PEJUANG	R Indrani	IND	Baharudin Kamarudin	IND	Rajah Narasam	IND		
Perak	P063	Tambun	160,558	Ahmad Faizal Azumu	PN (BERSATU)	Aminuddin Md Hanafiah	UMNO	Anwar Ibrahim	PKR	Ahmad Faizal Azumu	BERSATU					Abdul Rahim Tahir	PEJUANG								
Perak	P064	Ipoh Timor	118,178	Wong Kah Woh	PH (DAP)	Ng Kai Cheong	MCA	Howard Lee Chuan How	DAP	Nor Afzainizam Salleh	BERSATU														
Perak	P065	Ipoh Barat	114,654	Kulasegaran Murugeson	PH (DAP)	Low Guo Nan	MCA	Kulasegaran Murugeson	DAP	Chek Kwong Weng	GERAKAN							M. Kayveas	IND						
Perak	P066	Batu Gajah	111,896	Sivakumar Varatharaju Naidu	PH (DAP)	Teoh Chin Chong	MCA	Sivakumar Varatharaju Naidu	DAP	Woo Cheong Yuen	GERAKAN														
Perak	P067	Kuala Kangsar	46,985	Mastura Mohd Yazid	BN (UMNO)	Maslin Sham Razman	UMNO	Ahmad Termizi Ramli	AMANAH	Iskandar Dzulkarnain Abdul Khalid	BERSATU					Yusmalia Mohamad Yusof	PEJUANG								
Perak	P068	Beruas	108,249	Ngeh Koo Ham	PH (DAP)	Ding Siew Chee	MCA	Ngeh Koo Ham	DAP	Ong Kean Sing	GERAKAN														
Perak	P069	Parit	47,915	Mohd Nizar Zakaria	BN (UMNO)	Mohd Nizar Zakaria	UMNO	Nurthaqaffah Nordin	AMANAH	Muhamamd Ismi Mat Taib	PAS					Faizol Fadzli Mohamed	PEJUANG								
Perak	P070	Kampar	89,894	Thomas Su Keong Siong	PH (DAP)	Lee Chee Leong	MCA	Chong Zhemin	DAP	Janice Wong Oi Foon	GERAKAN							Leong Cheok Keng	WARISAN						
Perak	P071	Gopeng	143,657	Lee Boon Chye	PH (PKR)	Cally Ting Zhao Song	MCA	Tan Kar Hing	PKR	Muhammad Farhan Abdul Rahim	BERSATU							Balachandran Gopal	WARISAN						
Perak	P072	Tapah	61,946	Saravanan Murugan	BN (MIC)	Saravanan Murugan	MIC	Saraswathy Kandasami	PKR	Muhammad Yadzan Mohammad	BERSATU					Mior Nor Haidir Suhaimi	PEJUANG	Mohamed Akbar Sheriff Ali Yasin	WARISAN	M Kathiravan	IND				
Perak	P073	Pasir Salak	74,761	Tajuddin Abdul Rahman	BN (UMNO)	Khairul Azwan Harun	UMNO	Nik Omar Nik Abdul Aziz	PKR	Jamaluddin Yahya	PAS					Zairol Hizam Zakaria	PUTRA								
Perak	P074	Lumut	92,972	Mohd Hatta Md Ramli	PH (AMANAH)	Zambry Abdul Kadir	UMNO	Mohd Hatta Md Ramli	AMANAH	Nordin Ahmad Ismail	BERSATU					Mazlan Abdul Ghani	PEJUANG	Mohd Isnin Mohd Ismail @ Ibrahim Khan	WARISAN						
Perak	P075	Bagan Datuk	58,183	Ahmad Zahid Hamidi	BN (UMNO)	Ahmad Zahid Hamidi	UMNO	Shamsul Iskandar @ Yusre Mohd Akin	PKR	Muhammad Faiz Na'aman	BERSATU							Tawfik Ismail	IND						
Perak	P076	Teluk Intan	87,222	Nga Kor Ming	PH (DAP)	Murugiah Thopasamy	MIC	Nga Kor Ming	DAP	Zainol Fadzi Paharudin	BERSATU					Amir Khusyairi Mohamad Tanusi	PEJUANG								
Perak	P077	Tanjong Malim	93,873	Chang Lih Kang	PH (PKR)	Mah Hang Soon	MCA	Chang Lih Kang	PKR	Nolee Ashilin Mohammed Radzi	BERSATU					Amir Hamzah Abdul Razak	IMAN	Jamaluddin Mohd Radzi	IND	Izzat Johari	IND				
Pahang	P078	Cameron Highlands	46,020	Ramli Mohd Nor	BN (UMNO)	Ramli Mohd Nor	UMNO	Chiong Yoke Kong	DAP	Abdul Rasid Mohamed Ali	BERSATU														
Pahang	P079	Lipis	47,124	Abdul Rahman Mohamad	BN (UMNO)	Abdul Rahman Mohamad	UMNO	Tengku Zulpuri Shah Raja Puji	DAP	Mohamad Shahrum Osman	BERSATU					Aishaton Abu Bakar	PEJUANG								
Pahang	P080	Raub	75,064	Tengku Zulpuri Shah Raja Puji	PH (DAP)	Chong Sin Woon	MCA	Chow Yu Hui	DAP	Fakrunizam Ibrahim	BERSATU					Norkhairul Anuar Mohamed Nor	PEJUANG								
Pahang	P081	Jerantut	87,051	Ahmad Nazlan Idris	BN (UMNO)	Mohd Zukarmi Abu Bakar	UMNO	Hassan Basri Awang Mat Dahan	PKR	Khairil Nizam Khirudin	PAS														
Pahang	P082	Indera Mahkota	120,549	Saifuddin Abdullah	PN (BERSATU)	Quek Tai Seong	MCA	Zuraidi Ismail	PKR	Saifuddin Abdullah	BERSATU					Mohamad Nor Sundari	BERJASA								
Pahang	P083	Kuantan	87,597	Fuziah Salleh	PH (PKR)	Ab Hamid Mohd Nazahar	UMNO	Fuziah Salleh	PKR	Wan Razali Wan Nor	PAS					Anuar Tajuddin	PEJUANG								
Pahang	P084	Paya Besar	79,744	Mohd. Shahar Abdullah	BN (UMNO)	Mohd. Shahar Abdullah	UMNO	Ahmad Azam Mohd Salleh	AMANAH	Aireroshairi Roslan	PAS					Rosminahar Mohd Amin	PEJUANG								
Pahang	P085	Pekan	119,443	Vacant	VAC	Sh Mohamed Puzi Sh Ali	UMNO	Mohd Naim Zainal Abidin	PKR	Mohd Fadhil Noor Abdul Karim	PAS					Mohammad Radhi Abdul Razak	PEJUANG	Tengku Zainul Hisham Tengku Hussin	IND						
Pahang	P086	Maran	53,128	Ismail Abdul Muttalib	BN (UMNO)	Shahaniza Shamsuddin	UMNO	Ahmad Shuhor Awang	AMANAH	Ismail Abdul Muttalib	PN							Muhamad Hafiz Al-Hafiz	IND						
Pahang	P087	Kuala Krau	60,537	Ismail Mohamed Said	BN (UMNO)	Ismail Mohamed Said	UMNO	Juhari Osman	AMANAH	Kamal Ashaari	PAS					Shahruddin Mohamed Salleh	PEJUANG								
Pahang	P088	Temerloh	106,829	Mohd Anuar Mohd Tahir	PH (AMANAH)	Mohd Sharkar Shamsudin	UMNO	Mohd Hasbie Muda	AMANAH	Salamiah Mohd Nor	PAS					Aminuddin Yahya	GB								
Pahang	P089	Bentong	87,058	Wong Tack	PH (DAP)	Liow Tiong Lai	MCA	Young Syefura Othman	DAP	Roslan Hassan	BERSATU							Wong Tack	IND	Mohd Khalil Abdul Hamid	IND				
Pahang	P090	Bera	77,669	Dato' Seri Ismail Sabri Yaakob	BN (UMNO)	Dato' Seri Ismail Sabri Yaakob	UMNO	Abas Awang	PKR	Asmawi Harun	BERSATU														
Pahang	P091	Rompin	89,131	Hasan Arifin	BN (UMNO)	Hasan Arifin	UMNO	Erman Shah Jaios	PKR	Abdul Khalib Abdullah	BERSATU							Hamizi Hussain	IND						
Selangor	P092	Sabak Bernam	51,609	Mohamad Fasiah Mohd Fakeh	PN (BERSATU)	Abdul Rahman Bakri	UMNO	Shamsul Ma'arif Ismail	AMANAH	Kalam Salan	BERSATU					Idris Mat Yusof	GB								
Selangor	P093	Sungai Besar	64,382	Muslimin Yahaya	PN (BERSATU)	Jamal Yunos	UMNO	Saipolyazan Mat Yusop	PKR	Muslimin Yahaya	BERSATU					Asmawar Samat @ Samad	PUTRA								
Selangor	P094	Hulu Selangor	154,317	June Leow Hsiad Hui	PH (PKR)	Mohan Thangarasu	MIC	Sathia Prakash Nadarajan	PKR	Mohd Hasnizan Harun	PAS					Harumaini Omar	PEJUANG	Haniza Mohamed Talha	PBM	Azlinda Baroni	IND				
Selangor	P095	Tanjong Karang	62,194	Noh Omar	BN (UMNO)	Habibah Mohd Yusof	UMNO	Siti Rahayu Baharin	MUDA	Zulkafperi Hanapi	BERSATU					Azlan Sani Zawawi	GB	Mohd Rosni Mastol	IND						
Selangor	P096	Kuala Selangor	102,951	Dzulkefly Ahmad	PH (AMANAH)	Tengku Zafrul Aziz	UMNO	Dzulkefly Ahmad	AMANAH	Mohd Noor Mohd Sahar	PAS					Mohd Shaid Rosli	PEJUANG								
Selangor	P097	Selayang	181,539	William Leong Jee Keen	PH (PKR)	Chan Wun Hoong	MCA	William Leong Jee Keen	PKR	Abdul Rashid Asari	BERSATU					Salleh Amiruddin	PEJUANG	Muhammad Zaki Omar	IND						
Selangor	P098	Gombak	206,744	Mohamed Azmin Ali	PN (BERSATU)	Megat Zulkarnain Omardin	UMNO	Amirudin Shari	PKR	Mohamed Azmin Ali	BERSATU					Aziz Jamaludin Mohd Tahir	PUTRA	Zulkifli Ahmad	IND						
Selangor	P099	Ampang	133,494	Zuraida Kamaruddin	PBM	Ivone Low Yi Wen	MCA	Rodziah Ismail	PKR	Sasha Lyna Abdul Latif	BERSATU					Nurul Ashikin Mabahwi	PEJUANG	Bryan Lai Wai Chong	WARISAN	Zuraida Kamaruddin	PBM	Raveendran Marnokaran	IND	Tan Hua Meng	IND
Selangor	P099	Ampang	133,494	Zuraida Kamaruddin	PBM	Ivone Low Yi Wen	MCA	Rodziah Ismail	PKR	Sasha Lyna Abdul Latif	BERSATU					Nurul Ashikin Mabahwi	PEJUANG	Muhammad Shafiq Izwan Mohd Yunos	IND						
Selangor	P100	Pandan	148,730	Wan Azizah Wan Ismail	PH (PKR)	Leong Kok Wee	MCA	Rafizi Ramli	PKR	Muhammad Rafique Zubir Albakri	PAS					Nadia Hanafiah	GB	Ong Tee Keat	WARISAN						
Selangor	P101	Hulu Langat	166,902	Hasanuddin Mohd Yunus	PH (AMANAH)	Johan Abdul Aziz	UMNO	Mohd Sany Hamzan	AMANAH	Mohd Radzi Abd Latif	BERSATU					Markiman Kobiran	PEJUANG	Abdul Rahman Jaafar	WARISAN	Muhammad Mustafa	IND				
Selangor	P102	Bangi	303,430	Ong Kian Ming	PH (DAP)	Hoh Hee Lee	MCA	Syahredzan Johan	DAP	Muhammad Nazrul Hakim Md. Nazir	PAS					Annuar Salleh	BERJASA	Chee Chee Meng	PRM	Jamal Hisham Hashim	IND	Muhammad Fauzi Hasim	IND	Suthan Mookiah	IND
Selangor	P103	Puchong	152,861	Gobind Singh Deo	PH (DAP)	Syed Ibrahim Syed Abdul Kader	KIMMA	Yeo Bee Yin	DAP	Jimmy Chew Jyh Gang	GERAKAN							Kuan Chee Heng	IND						
Selangor	P104	Subang	230,940	Wong Chen	PH (PKR)	Kow Cheong Wei	MCA	Wong Chen	PKR	Alex Ang Hiang Ni	GERAKAN														
Selangor	P105	Petaling Jaya	195,148	Maria Chin Abdullah	PH (PKR)	Chew Hian Tat	MCA	Lee Chean Chung	PKR	Theng Book	BERSATU					Mazween Mokhtar	GB	Ezam Mohd Nor	PRM	K J John	IND				
Selangor	P106	Damansara	239,103	Tony Pua Kiam Wee	PH (DAP)	Tan Gim Tuan	MCA	Gobind Singh Deo	DAP	Lim Si Ching	GERAKAN														
Selangor	P107	Sungai Buloh	158,090	Sivarasa Rasiah	PH (PKR)	Khairy Jamaluddin	UMNO	Ramanan Ramakrishnan	PKR	Mohd Ghazali Md Hamin	PAS					Mohd Akmal Mohd Yusoff	PEJUANG	Ahmad Zuhri Faisal	PRM	Nurhaslinda Basri	IND	Syed Abdul Razak Syed Long Alsagoff	IND		
Selangor	P108	Shah Alam	165,744	Khalid Abdul Samad	PH (AMANAH)	Hizatul Isham Abdul Jalil	UMNO	Azli Yusof	AMANAH	Afif Bahardin	BERSATU					Muhammad Rafique Rashid Ali	PEJUANG								
Selangor	P109	Kapar	189,369	Abdullah Sani Abdul Hamid	PH (PKR)	Muhammad Noor Azman	UMNO	Abdullah Sani Abdul Hamid	PKR	Halimah Ali	PAS					Mohd Pathan Hussin	BERJASA	Rahim Awang	WARISAN	Daroyah Alwi	PBM	VP Sevelinggam	IND		
Selangor	P110	Klang	208,913	Charles Anthony Santiago	PH (DAP)	Tee Hooi Ling	MCA	Ganabatirau Veraman	DAP	Jaya Chandran Perumal	BERSATU							Loo Cheng Wee	WARISAN	Chandra Sivarajan	PRM	Hedrhin Ramli @ Awin	IND	JR Deepak Jaikishan	IND
Selangor	P111	Kota Raja	244,712	Mohamad Sabu	PH (AMANAH)	Kajendran Doraisamy	MIC	Mohamad Sabu	AMANAH	Mohamed Diah Baharun	PAS					Fahmi Bazlan Muda	BERJASA	Che Sara Afiqah Zainul Arif	PRM	Kumar Karananendi	IND	P Raveentharan A Periasamy	IND	Suhendhar Selvaraju	IND
Selangor	P112	Kuala Langat	148,637	Xavier Jayakumar Arulanandam	PBM	Mohana Muniandy Raman	MIC	Manivannan Gowindasamy	PKR	Ahmad Yunus Hairi	PAS					Mohd Ridzuan Abdullah	GB	Gaveson Murugeson	PRM	Zanariah Jumhuri	IND				
Selangor	P113	Sepang	168,039	Mohamed Hanipa Maidin	PH (AMANAH)	Anuar Basiran	UMNO	Raj Munni Sabu @ Aiman Athirah	AMANAH	Rina Mohd Harun	BERSATU					Che Asmah Ibrahim	PEJUANG	Nageswaran Ravi	PRM	Mohd Daud Leong Abdullah	PUR	Muneswaran Muthiah	IND	Shahrul Amri Mat Sari	IND
Wilayah Persekutuan Kuala Lumpur	P114	Kepong	94,285	Lim Lip Eng	PH (DAP)	Yap Zheng Hoe	MCA	Lim Lip Eng	DAP	Phang Jing Fatt	GERAKAN							Young Shang Yi	WARISAN	Yee Poh Ping	IND				
Wilayah Persekutuan Kuala Lumpur	P115	Batu	113,863	Prabakaran Parameswaran	PH (PKR)	A. Kohilan Pillay	MIC	Prabakaran Parameswaran	PKR	Azhar Yahya	PAS					Wan Azliana Wan Adnan	PEJUANG	Naganathan Pillai	WARISAN	Zulkifli Abdul Fadlan	PRM	Nur Fathiah Syazwana Shaharuddin	IND	Siti Zabedah Kasim	IND
Wilayah Persekutuan Kuala Lumpur	P115	Batu	113,863	Prabakaran Parameswaran	PH (PKR)	A. Kohilan Pillay	MIC	Prabakaran Parameswaran	PKR	Azhar Yahya	PAS					Wan Azliana Wan Adnan	PEJUANG	Too Gao Lan @ Too Cheng Huat	IND	Chua Tian Chang	IND				
Wilayah Persekutuan Kuala Lumpur	P116	Wangsa Maju	120,323	Tan Yee Kew	PH (PKR)	Mohd Shafei Abdullah	UMNO	Zahir Hassan	PKR	Nuridah Mohd Salleh	PAS					Norzaila Arifin	PUTRA	Wee Choo Keong	WARISAN	Raveentheran Suntheralingam	IND				
Wilayah Persekutuan Kuala Lumpur	P117	Segambut	119,652	Hannah Yeoh Tseow Suan	PH (DAP)	Daniel Ling Sia Chin	MCA	Hannah Yeoh Tseow Suan	DAP	Prabagaran Vythilingam	GERAKAN														
Wilayah Persekutuan Kuala Lumpur	P118	Setiawangsa	95,753	Nik Nazmi Nik Ahmad	PH (PKR)	Izudin Ishak	UMNO	Nik Nazmi Nik Ahmad	PKR	Nurul Fadzilah Kamarulddin	BERSATU					Bibi Sunita Sakandar Khan	PEJUANG	Stanley Lim Yen Tiong	IND	Mior Rosli Mior Mohd Jaafar	IND				
Wilayah Persekutuan Kuala Lumpur	P119	Titiwangsa	80,747	Rina Mohd Harun	PN (BERSATU)	Johari Abdul Ghani	UMNO	Khalid Samad	AMANAH	Rosni Adam	PAS					Khairuddin Abu Hassan	PEJUANG								
Wilayah Persekutuan Kuala Lumpur	P120	Bukit Bintang	79,782	Fong Kui Lun	PH (DAP)	Tan Teik Peng	MCA	Fong Kui Lun	DAP	Edwin Chen Win Keong	BERSATU														
Wilayah Persekutuan Kuala Lumpur	P121	Lembah Pantai	101,828	Ahmad Fahmi Mohamed Fadzil	PH (PKR)	Ramlan Shahean @ Askolani	UMNO	Ahmad Fahmi Mohamed Fadzil	PKR	Fauzi Abu Bakar	PAS					Noor Asmah Mohd Razalli	PUTRA								
Wilayah Persekutuan Kuala Lumpur	P122	Seputeh	124,805	Teresa Kok Suh Sim	PH (DAP)	Lee Kah Hing	MCA	Teresa Kok Suh Sim	DAP	Alan Wong Yee Yeng	GERAKAN							Lee Wai Hong	IND	Choy San Yeh @ Lian Choy Ling	IND				
Wilayah Persekutuan Kuala Lumpur	P123	Cheras	101,184	Tan Kok Wai	PH (DAP)	Chong Yew Chuan	MCA	Tan Kok Wai	DAP	Ruby Chin Yoke Kheng	BERSATU														
Wilayah Persekutuan Kuala Lumpur	P124	Bandar Tun Razak	119,185	Kamarudin Jaffar	PN (BERSATU)	Chew Yin Keen	MCA	Wan Azizah Wan Ismail	PKR	Kamarudin Jaffar	BERSATU														
Wilayah Persekutuan Putrajaya	P125	Putrajaya	42,881	Tengku Adnan Tengku Mansor	BN (UMNO)	Tengku Adnan Tengku Mansor	UMNO	Noraishah Mydin Abdul Aziz	PKR	Radzi Jidin	BERSATU					Mohd Rosli Ramli	BERJASA	Samsudin Mohamad Fauzi	IND	Lim Fice Bee	IND				
Negeri Sembilan	P126	Jelebu	59,561	Jalaluddin Alias	BN (UMNO)	Jalaluddin Alias	UMNO	Zulkefly Mohamad Omar	AMANAH	Zaharuddin Baba Samon	BERSATU					Ahmad Fakri Abu Samah	PUTRA								
Negeri Sembilan	P127	Jempol	95,813	Mohd Salim Mohd Shariff	BN (UMNO)	Shamshulkahar Mohd. Deli	UMNO	Norwani Ahmat	AMANAH	Muhammad Noraffendy Mohd Salleh	BERSATU					Mohd Khalid Mohd Yunus	PUTRA								
Negeri Sembilan	P128	Seremban	157,244	Anthony Loke Siew Fook	PH (DAP)	Felicia Wong Yin Ting	MCA	Anthony Loke Siew Fook	DAP	Mohd Fadli Che Me	PAS					Mohamad Jani Ismail	PEJUANG	Izzat Lesly	IND						
Negeri Sembilan	P129	Kuala Pilah	63,247	Eddin Syazlee Shith	PN (BERSATU)	Adnan Abu Hassan	UMNO	Nor Azman Mohamad	PKR	Eddin Syazlee Shith	BERSATU					Kamarulzaman Kamdias	PUTRA	Azman Idris	WARISAN						
Negeri Sembilan	P130	Rasah	155,896	Cha Kee Chin	PH (DAP)	Ng Kian Nam	MCA	Cha Kee Chin	DAP	David Choong Vee Hing	GERAKAN														
Negeri Sembilan	P131	Rembau	133,555	Khairy Jamaluddin	BN (UMNO)	Mohamad Hasan	UMNO	Julfitri Joha	PKR	Mohd Nazree Mohd Yunus	BERSATU					Ramly Awalludin	PEJUANG	Tinagaran Subramaniam	PSM						
Negeri Sembilan	P132	Port Dickson	104,450	Anwar Ibrahim	PH (PKR)	P. Kamalanathan	MIC	Aminuddin Harun	PKR	Rafei Mustapha	PAS					Ahmad Idham Ahmad Nazri	GB	Abdul Rani Kulup Abdullah	IND						
Negeri Sembilan	P133	Tampin	81,099	Hasan Bahrom	PH (AMANAH)	Mohd Isam Mohd Isa	UMNO	Muhammad Faiz Fadzil	AMANAH	Abdul Halim Abu Bakar	PAS					Zamani Ibrahim	BERJASA								
Melaka	P134	Masjid Tanah	69,174	Mas Ermieyati Samsudin	PN (BERSATU)	Abdul Hakim Abdul Wahid	UMNO	Muthalib Uthman	MUDA	Mas Ermieyati Samsudin	BERSATU					Handrawirawan Abu Bakar	PEJUANG								
Melaka	P135	Alor Gajah	93,311	Mohd Redzuan Md Yusof	PN (BERSATU)	Shahril Sufian Hamdan	UMNO	Adly Zahari	AMANAH	Mohd Redzuan Md Yusof	BERSATU					Muhammad Nazriq Abdul Rahman	BERJASA|								
Melaka	P136	Tangga Batu	115,998	Rusnah Aluai	PH (PKR)	Lim Ban Hong	MCA	Rusnah Aluai	PKR	Bakri Jamaluddin	PAS					Ghazali Abu	PUTRA	Shahril Mahmood	IND						
Melaka	P137	Hang Tuah Jaya	118,493	Shamsul Iskandar @ Yusre Mohd Akin	PH (PKR)	Mohd Ridhwan Mohd Ali	UMNO	Adam Adli Abdul Halim	PKR	Mohd Azrudin Md Idris	BERSATU					Sheikh Ikhzan Sheikh Salleh	PEJUANG								
Melaka	P138	Kota Melaka	164,140	Khoo Poay Tiong	PH (DAP)	Kon Qi Yao	MCA	Khoo Poay Tiong	DAP	Suhaime Borhan	GERAKAN							Norazlanshah Hazali	IND						
Melaka	P139	Jasin	96,208	Ahmad Hamzah	BN (UMNO)	Roslan Ahmad	UMNO	Harun Mohamed	AMANAH	Zulkifli Ismail	PAS					Mohd Daud Nasir	PEJUANG								
Johor	P140	Segamat	69,360	Edmund Santhara Kumar Ramanaidu	PBM	Ramasamy Muthusamy	MIC	Yuneswaran Ramaraj	PKR	Poobalan Ponusamy	BERSATU					Syed Hairoul Faizey Syed Ali	PUTRA								
Johor	P141	Sekijang	63,981	Natrah Ismail	PH (PKR)	Md Salleheen Mohamad	UMNO	Zaliha Mustafa	PKR	Uzzair Ismail	BERSATU					Mohd Saiful Faizal Abd Halim	PUTRA	Mohd Zohar Ahmad	WARISAN						
Johor	P142	Labis	49,846	Pang Hok Liong	PH (DAP)	Chua Tee Yong	MCA	Pang Hok Liong	DAP	Alvin Chang Teck Kiam	BERSATU														
Johor	P143	Pagoh	69,939	Muhyiddin Yassin	PN (BERSATU)	Razali Ibrahim	UMNO	Iskandar Shah Abdul Rahman	PKR	Muhyiddin Yassin	BERSATU														
Johor	P144	Ledang	104,577	Syed Ibrahim Syed Noh	PH (PKR)	Hamim Samuri	UMNO	Syed Ibrahim Syed Noh	PKR	Zaidi Abd Majid	BERSATU					Rafidah Ridwan	PEJUANG	Yunus Mustakim	IND	Zainal Bahrom	IND				
Johor	P145	Bakri	97,335	Yeo Bee Yin	PH (DAP)	Lee Ching Yong	MCA	Tan Hong Pin	DAP	Chelvarajan Suppiah	BERSATU							Haron Jaffar	IND						
Johor	P146	Muar	68,925	Syed Saddiq Syed Abdul Rahman	MUDA	Mohd Helmy Abd Latif	UMNO	Syed Saddiq Syed Abdul Rahman	MUDA	Abdullah Husin	PAS														
Johor	P147	Parit Sulong	79,484	Noraini Ahmad	BN (UMNO)	Noraini Ahmad	UMNO	Mohd Faizal Dollah	AMANAH	Abdul Karim Deraman	PAS														
Johor	P148	Ayer Hitam	61,041	Wee Ka Siong	BN (MCA)	Wee Ka Siong	MCA	Sheikh Umar Bagharib Ali	DAP	Muhammad Syafiq A Aziz	BERSATU														
Johor	P149	Sri Gading	78,602	Shahruddin Md Salleh	GTA (PEJUANG)	Mohd Lassim Burhan	UMNO	Aminolhuda Hassan	AMANAH	Zanariyah Abdul Hamid	PAS					Mahdzir Ibrahim	PEJUANG								
Johor	P150	Batu Pahat	133,910	Mohd Rashid Hasnon	PN (BERSATU)	Ishak @ Mohd Farid Siraj	UMNO	Onn Abu Bakar	PKR	Mohd Rashid Hasnon	BERSATU					Nizam Bashir Abdul Kariem Bashier	PEJUANG	Zahari Osman	PRM						
Johor	P151	Simpang Renggam	59,033	Maszlee Malik	PH (PKR)	Hasni Mohammad	UMNO	Maszlee Malik	PKR	Mohd Fazrul Kamat	BERSATU					Kamal Kusmin	PUTRA								
Johor	P152	Kluang	132,342	Wong Shu Qi	PH (DAP)	Gan Ping Sieu	MCA	Wong Shu Qi	DAP	Dzulkarnain Alias	BERSATU							Ramendran Ulaganathan	IND						
Johor	P153	Sembrong	54,982	Hishammuddin Hussein	BN (UMNO)	Hishamuddin Hussein	UMNO	Hasni Abas	PKR	Aziz Ismail	BERSATU														
Johor	P154	Mersing	66,275	Abdul Latiff Ahmad	PN (BERSATU)	Abdul Latif Bandi @ Nor Sebandi	UMNO	Fatin Zulaikha Zaidi	DAP	Muhammad Islahuddin Abas	BERSATU					Nurfatimah Ibrahim	PEJUANG	Ismail Don	IND						
Johor	P155	Tenggara	67,294	Adham Baba	BN (UMNO)	Manndzri Nasib	UMNO	Zuraidah Zainab Mohd Zain	PKR	Mohd Nazari Mokhtar	PAS					M Azhar Palal	PUTRA								
Johor	P156	Kota Tinggi	61,291	Halimah Mohamed Sadique	BN (UMNO)	Mohamed Khaled Nordin	UMNO	Onn Jaafar	AMANAH	Mohamad Ridhwan Rasman	BERSATU														
Johor	P157	Pengerang	55,316	Azalina Othman Said	BN (UMNO)	Azalina Othman Said	UMNO	Che Zakaria Mohd Salleh	AMANAH	Fairulnizar Rahmat	BERSATU														
Johor	P158	Tebrau	223,301	Steven Choong Shiau Yoon	PBM	Nicole Wong Siaw Ting	MCA	Jimmy Puah Wee Tse	PKR	Mohamad Isa Mohamad Basir	BERSATU														
Johor	P159	Pasir Gudang	198,485	Hassan Abdul Karim	PH (PKR)	Noor Azleen Ambros	UMNO	Hassan Abdul Karim	PKR	Mohamad Farid Abdul Razak	BERSATU					Mohammad Raffi Beran	IMAN								
Johor	P160	Johor Bahru	136,368	Akmal Nasrullah Mohd Nasir	PH (PKR)	Johan Arifin Mohd Ropi	UMNO	Akmal Nasrullah Mohd Nasir	PKR	Mohd Mohtaj Yacob	BERSATU					Mohd Akhiri Mahmood	PEJUANG								
Johor	P161	Pulai	165,313	Salahuddin Ayub	PH (AMANAH)	Nur Jazlan Mohamed	UMNO	Salahuddin Ayub	AMANAH	Loh Kah Yong	GERAKAN														
Johor	P162	Iskandar Puteri	222,437	Lim Kit Siang	PH (DAP)	Jason Teoh Sew Hock	MCA	Liew Chin Tong	DAP	Jashen Tan Nam Cha	BERSATU														
Johor	P163	Kulai	151,247	Teo Nie Ching	PH (DAP)	Chua Jian Boon	MCA	Teo Nie Ching	DAP	Tan Chin Hok	GERAKAN														
Johor	P164	Pontian	75,212	Ahmad Maslan	BN (UMNO)	Ahmad Maslan	UMNO	Shazwan Zdainal Abidin	DAP	Isa Ab Hamid	BERSATU					Jamaluddin Mohamad	GB								
Johor	P165	Tanjung Piai	70,679	Wee Jeck Seng	BN (MCA)	Wee Jeck Seng	MCA	Lim Wei Jiet	MUDA	Najwah Halimah Ab Alim	BERSATU														
Wilayah Persekutuan Labuan	P166	Labuan	44,484	Rozman Isli	WARISAN	Bashir Alias	UMNO	Ramli Tahir	AMANAH	Suhaili Abdul Rahman	BERSATU					Ramle Mat Daly	PUTRA	Rozman Isli	WARISAN	Dayang Rusimah @ Raynie Mohd Din	PBM				
Sabah	P167	Kudat	75,724	Abdul Rahim Bakri	GRS (BERSATU Sabah)			Thonny Chee	PKR					Ruddy Awah	BERSATU	Nur Alya Humaira Usun Abdullah	PEJUANG	Abdul Rashid Abdul Harun	WARISAN	Verdon Bahanda	IND				
Sabah	P168	Kota Marudu	80,735	Maximus Ongkili	GRS (PBS)			Shahrizal Denci	MUDA					Maximus Ongkili	PBS	Mohd Azmee Zulkiflee	PEJUANG	Jilid Kuminding @ Zainuddin	WARISAN	Wetrom Bahanda	KDM	Norman Tulang	IND		
Sabah	P169	Kota Belud	79,885	Isnaraissah Munirah Majilis @ Fakharudy	WARISAN	Abdul Rahman Dahlan	UMNO	Madeli @ Modily Bangali	PKR									Isnaraissah Munirah Majilis @ Fakharudy	WARISAN						
Sabah	P170	Tuaran	83,419	Wilfred Madius Tangau	PH (UPKO)			Wilfred Madius Tangau	UPKO					Joniston Bangkuai	PBS	Muminin Kalingkong @ Norbinsha	PEJUANG	Joanna Rampas	WARISAN	Noortaip Suhaili @ Sualee	IND	Boby Lewat	IND		
Sabah	P171	Sepanggar	108,370	Mohd Azis Jamman	WARISAN	Yakubah Khan	UMNO	Mustapha @ Mohd Yunus Sakmud	PKR							Yusof Kunchang	PEJUANG	Mohd Azis Jamman	WARISAN	Jumardie Lukman	KDM				
Sabah	P172	Kota Kinabalu	74,059	Chan Foong Hin	PH (DAP)			Chan Foong Hin	DAP					Yee Tsai Yiew	PBS			Amanda Yeo Yan Yin	WARISAN	Winston Liew Kit Siong	KDM	Marcel Jude	IND		
Sabah	P173	Putatan	63,173	Awang Husaini Sahari	PH (PKR)	Shahelmey Yahya	UMNO	Awang Husaini Sahari	PKR							Poyne Tudus @ Patrick Payne	GB	Ahmad Mohd Said	WARISAN						
Sabah	P174	Penampang	77,214	Ignatius Dorell Leiking	WARISAN			Ewon Benedick	UPKO					Kenny Chua Teck Ho	STAR			Ignatius Dorell Leiking	WARISAN	Richard Jimmy	IND				
Sabah	P175	Papar	59,942	Ahmad Hassan	WARISAN			Henry Shim Chee On	DAP					Armizan Mohd Ali	BERSATU	Nicholas Sylvester @ Berry	PEJUANG	Ahmad Hassan	WARISAN	Norbert Chin	IND	Johnny Sitamin	IND		
Sabah	P176	Kimanis	40,763	Mohamad Alamin	BN (UMNO)	Mohamad Alamin	UMNO	Rowindy Lawrence Odong	UPKO							Yusop Osman	PEJUANG	Daud Yusof	WARISAN	Amat Mohd Yusof	KDM				
Sabah	P177	Beaufort	43,248	Azizah Mohd Dun	GRS (BERSATU Sabah)	Siti Aminah Aching	UMNO	Dikin Musah	PKR									Masri Adul	WARISAN	Johair Mat Lani	KDM	Johan @ Christopher O T Ghani	IND	Matlani Sabli	IND
Sabah	P178	Sipitang	45,871	Yamani Hafez Musa	GRS (BERSATU Sabah)			Lahirul Latigul	AMANAH					Matbali Musah	BERSATU			Adnan Puteh	WARISAN						
Sabah	P179	Ranau	66,517	Jonathan Yasin	GRS (BERSATU Sabah)			Taufik Dahalan	PKR					Jonathan Yasin	BERSATU	Azizul Julrin	PEJUANG	Markos Siton	WARISAN	Ewon Ebin	PBRS				
Sabah	P180	Keningau	87,588	Jeffrey Kitingan	GRS (STAR)			Grelydia Gillod	DAP					Jeffrey Kitingan	STAR			Rasinin Kautis	WARISAN	Jake Nointin	KDM				
Sabah	P181	Tenom	42,045	Noorita Sual	PH (DAP)	Jamawi Ja’afar	UMNO	Noorita Sual	DAP									Ukim Buandi	WARISAN	Riduan Rubin	IND	Peggy Chaw Zhi Ting	IND		
Sabah	P182	Pensiangan	55,672	Arthur Joseph Kurup	BN (PBRS)	Arthur Joseph Kurup	PBRS	Sangkar Rasam	PKR							Jamani Derimin @ Gampalid	PEJUANG	Siti Noorhasmahwatty Osman	WARISAN	Jekerison Kilan	KDM				
Sabah	P183	Beluran	44,727	Ronald Kiandee	GRS (BERSATU Sabah)	Benedict Asmat	UMNO	Felix Joseph Saang	UPKO	Ronald Kiandee	BERSATU					Hausing Sudin @ Samsudin	PEJUANG	Rowiena Rashid	WARISAN						
Sabah	P184	Libaran	72,332	Zakaria Edris	GRS (BERSATU Sabah)	Suhaimi Nasir	UMNO	Peter Jr Naintin	UPKO							Jeffri @ Amat Pudang	PEJUANG	SH Bokrata SH Hassan	WARISAN	Nordin Khani	PPRS	Amdan Tumpong	IND		
Sabah	P185	Batu Sapi	43,916	Vacant	VAC			Liau Fui Fui	DAP					Khairul Firdaus Akhbar Khan	BERSATU	Boni Yusuf Abdullah @ Narseso P Juanico	PUTRA	Alias Sani	WARISAN	Othman Ahmad	IND				
Sabah	P186	Sandakan	55,542	Vivian Wong Shir Yee	PH (DAP)			Vivian Wong Shir Yee	DAP					Lau Chee Kiong @ Thomas Lau	SAPP			Alex Thien	WARISAN	Peter Hii	IND	Syeikh Lokeman	IND	Lita Tan Abdullah	IND
Sabah	P187	Kinabatangan	44,773	Bung Mokhtar Radin	BN (UMNO)	Bung Mokhtar Radin	UMNO											Mazliwati Abdul Malek	WARISAN						
Sabah	P188	Lahad Datu	100,256	Mohammadin Ketapi	PBM	Maizatul Alkam Alawi	UMNO	Oscar Sia Yu Hock	DAP									Mohd Yusof Apdal	WARISAN						
Sabah	P189	Semporna	72,169	Mohd Shafie Apdal	WARISAN			Arastam Paradong	PKR					Nixon Abdul Habi	BERSATU	Ab Rajik Ab Hamid	PEJUANG	Mohd Shafie Apdal	WARISAN						
Sabah	P190	Tawau	87,477	Christina Liew Chin Jin	PH (PKR)			Christina Liew Chin Jin	PKR					Lo Su Fui	PBS	Herman Amdas	PEJUANG	Chen Ket Chuin	WARISAN	Mohd Salleh Bacho	IND	Chin Chee Syn	IND		
Sabah	P191	Kalabakan	83,970	Ma'mun Sulaiman	WARISAN	Andi Muhammad Suryady Bandy	UMNO	Noraini Abd Ghapur	PKR							Nur Aini Abdul Rahman	PEJUANG	Ma'mun Sulaiman	WARISAN	Muhamad Dhiauddin Hassan	IND				
Sarawak	P192	Mas Gading	47,171	Mordi Bimol	PH (DAP)			Mordi Bimol	DAP			Lidang Disen	PDP					Ryan Sim Min Leong	PBK						
Sarawak	P193	Santubong	79,540	Wan Junaidi Tuanku Jaafar	GPS (PBB)			Mohamad Zen Peli	AMANAH			Nancy Shukri	PBB							Affendi Jeman	IND				
Sarawak	P194	Petra Jaya	109,809	Fadillah Yusof	GPS (PBB)			Sopian Julaihi	PKR			Fadillah Yusof	PBB							Othman Abdillah	SEDAR				
Sarawak	P195	Bandar Kuching	109,710	Kelvin Yii Lee Wuen	PH (DAP)			Kelvin Yii Lee Wuen	DAP			Tay Tze Kok	SUPP					Voon Lee Shan	PBK						
Sarawak	P196	Stampin	121,009	Chong Chieng Jen	PH (DAP)			Chong Chieng Jen	DAP			Lo Khere Chiang	SUPP					Lue Cheng Hing	PBK						
Sarawak	P197	Kota Samarahan	82,229	Rubiah Wang	GPS (PBB)			Abang Abdul Halil Abang Naili	AMANAH			Rubiah Wang	PBB												
Sarawak	P198	Puncak Borneo	79,969	Willie Mongin	GPS (PBB)			Diog Dios	PKR			Willie Mongin	PBB					Iana Akam	PSB						
Sarawak	P199	Serian	65,273	Richard Riot Jaem	GPS (SUPP)			Learry Jabul	DAP			Richard Riot Jaem	SUPP					Elsiy Tinggang	PSB	Alim Impira	IND				
Sarawak	P200	Batang Sadong	32,640	Nancy Shukri	GPS (PBB)			Lahaji Lahiya	AMANAH			Rodiyah Sapiee	PBB												
Sarawak	P201	Batang Lupar	43,072	Rohani Abdul Karim	GPS (PBB)			Wel @ Maxwell Rojis	AMANAH	Hamdan Sani	PAS	Mohamad Shafizan Kepli	PBB												
Sarawak	P202	Sri Aman	50,164	Masir Kujat	IND			Tay Wei Wei	PKR			Doris Sophia Brodi	PRS					Wilson Entabang	PSB	Masir Kujat	IND				
Sarawak	P203	Lubok Antu	28,995	Jugah Muyang	IND			Langga Lias	PKR	Jugah Muyang	BERSATU	Roy Angau Gingkoi	PRS					Johnical Rayong Ngipa	PSB						
Sarawak	P204	Betong	41,743	Robert Lawson Chuat	GPS (PBB)			Patrick Kamis	PKR			Richard Rapu @ Begri	PBB							Hasbie Satar	IND				
Sarawak	P205	Saratok	44,531	Ali Biju	PN (BERSATU)			Ibil Jaya	PKR	Ali Biju	BERSATU	Giendam Jonathan Tait	PDP												
Sarawak	P206	Tanjong Manis	32,948	Yusuf Abd. Wahab	GPS (PBB)			Zainab Suhaili	AMANAH			Yusuf Abd. Wahab	PBB												
Sarawak	P207	Igan	28,290	Ahmad Johnie Zawawi	GPS (PBB)			Andri Zulkarnaen Hamden	AMANAH			Ahmad Johnie Zawawi	PBB												
Sarawak	P208	Sarikei	55,018	Wong Ling Biu	PH (DAP)			Roderick Wong Siew Lead	DAP			Huang Tiong Sii	SUPP												
Sarawak	P209	Julau	34,850	Larry Sng Wei Shien	PBM							Joseph Salang Gandum	PRS					Susan George	PBDS	Larry Sng Wei Shien	PBM	Elly Ngalai	IND		
Sarawak	P210	Kanowit	30,988	Aaron Ago Dagang	GPS (PRS)			Mohd Fauzi Abdullah @ Joseph	PKR			Aaron Ago Dagang	PRS					George Chen	IND	Elli Luhat	IND	Michael Lias	IND		
Sarawak	P211	Lanang	87,356	Alice Lau Kiong Yieng	PH (DAP)			Alice Lau Kiong Yieng	DAP			Wong Ching Yong	SUPP					Priscilla Lau	PSB	Wong Tiing Kiong	IND				
Sarawak	P212	Sibu	105,875	Oscar Ling Chai Yew	PH (DAP)			Oscar Ling Chai Yew	DAP			Clarence Ting Ing Horh	SUPP					Wong Soon Koh	PSB						
Sarawak	P213	Mukah	46,964	Hanifah Hajar Taib	GPS (PBB)			Abdul Jalil Bujang	PKR			Hanifah Hajar Taib	PBB												
Sarawak	P214	Selangau	45,743	Baru Bian	PSB			Umpang Sabang	PKR			Edwin Banta	PRS					Henry Joseph Usual	IND						
Sarawak	P215	Kapit	45,210	Alexander Nanta Linggi	GPS (PBB)			Khusyairy Pangkas Abdullah	PKR			Alexander Nanta Linggi	PBB					Robert Saweng	PBDS						
Sarawak	P216	Hulu Rajang	43,438	Wilson Ugak Kumbong	GPS (PRS)			Abun Sui Anyit	PKR			Wilson Ugak Kumbong	PRS												
Sarawak	P217	Bintulu	113,599	Tiong King Sing	GPS (PDP)			Tony Chiew Chan Yew	DAP	Duke Janteng	BERSATU	Tiong King Sing	PDP												
Sarawak	P218	Sibuti	58,522	Lukanisman Awang Sauni	GPS (PBB)			Zolhaidah Suboh	PKR			Lukanisman Awang Sauni	PBB					Bobby William	PBDS						
Sarawak	P219	Miri	143,229	Michael Teo Yu Keng	PH (PKR)			Chiew Choon Man	PKR			Jeffery Phang Siaw Foong	SUPP					Lawrance Lai	PSB						
Sarawak	P220	Baram	59,535	Anyi Ngau	GPS (PDP)			Roland Engan	PKR			Anyi Ngau	PDP							Wilfred Entika	IND				
Sarawak	P221	Limbang	41,999	Hasbi Habibollah	GPS (PBB)			Racha Balang	PKR			Hasbi Habibollah	PBB												
Sarawak	P222	Lawas	33,655	Henry Sum Agong	GPS (PBB)			Japar Suyut	PKR			Henry Sum Agong	PBB					Baru Bian	PSB						

== Campaign ==
=== Timing of election ===
Opposition politicians, political analysts and online commentaries criticised the decision to hold the election at the end of 2022 instead of early 2023, which coincides the annual year-end monsoon season. As Malaysia was already recovering from serious flooding from the previous year, opposition politicians accused the ruling government for being inconsiderate towards flood victims. This condition was also seen by opposition parties as a deliberate tactic to discourage a high voter turnout that could potentially benefit opposition parties. In response, UMNO president Ahmad Zahid Hamidi, who remarked that the election was to proceed despite concerns of nationwide floods, accused opposition parties as "cowards" and "wanting them to buy time" to garner extra support, further adding that his remarks were taken out of context. Despite these remarks, authorities began preparations in the event flooding occurs during polling day.

The decision to dissolve parliament early was also seen by several other opposition politicians as an attempt to prevent more BN politicians from being charged with corruption, or in an effort towards pardoning jailed politicians such as former prime minister Najib Razak who was found guilty for his role in the 1MDB scandal. This was evidenced by a video online showing Zahid Hamidi speaking at a Malaysian Indian Congress (MIC) general meeting in which he warned other BN politicians that they would be the next ones to be charged should BN lose the election. Prime Minister Ismail Sabri Yaakob said he dissolved Parliament because it was impossible to go on some issues, and that UMNO was pushing for it ever since BN won big in the 2022 Johor state election in March.

=== Youth vote ===
The 2022 election was the first Malaysian federal election in which the voting age is over 18 as opposed to over 21 previously. Around 6 million new voters, either young or previously unregistered, were expected to participate in the election. The 18–20 age group represented 1.39 million first-time voters, and voters aged 18–39 account for about 50% of Malaysia's 21 million registered voters.

== Endorsements ==
Newspapers, organisations and individuals endorsed parties or individual candidates for the election.

== Outgoing members of parliament ==
The seats of Gerik and Batu Sapi were left vacant due to the deaths of their respective MPs, Hasbullah Osman (BN-UMNO) and Liew Vui Keong (WARISAN) in 2020. By-elections were due to be held, but did not materialise due to the declaration of the state of emergency during the COVID-19 pandemic in 2021. The declarations were later revoked by the Yang di-Pertuan Agong following the dissolution of parliament.

Members of the 14th Parliament who were not contesting the 2022 election
No.	Constituency	Departing MP	First elected	Party	Date announced	Reason	Refs
P054	Gerik	Hasbullah Osman	2013	BN (UMNO)	16 November 2020	Died in office	
P139	Jasin	Ahmad Hamzah	2008	BN (UMNO)	20 December 2020	Not seeking re-election	
P061	Padang Rengas	Mohamed Nazri Abdul Aziz	1995	BN (UMNO)	28 August 2021	Not seeking re-election	
P085	Pekan	Najib Razak	1976	BN (UMNO)	23 August 2022	Criminal conviction	
P033	Besut	Idris Jusoh	1995	BN (UMNO)	24 October 2022	Not seeking re-election	
P081	Jerantut	Ahmad Nazlan Idris	2013	BN (UMNO)	31 October 2022	Not seeking re-election	
P026	Ketereh	Annuar Musa	1990	BN (UMNO)	1 November 2022	Dropped by party	
P067	Kuala Kangsar	Mastura Mohd Yazid	2016	BN (UMNO)	1 November 2022	Dropped by party	
P073	Pasir Salak	Tajuddin Abdul Rahman	2008	BN (UMNO)	1 November 2022	Membership suspended	
P155	Tenggara	Adham Baba	2004	BN (UMNO)	1 November 2022	Dropped by party	
P156	Kota Tinggi	Halimah Mohamed Sadique	2008	BN (UMNO)	1 November 2022	Dropped by party	
P127	Jempol	Mohd Salim Shariff	2018	BN (UMNO)	3 November 2022	Dropped by party	
P095	Tanjong Karang	Noh Omar	1995	BN (UMNO)	3 November 2022	Dropped by party	
P162	Iskandar Puteri	Lim Kit Siang	1969	PH (DAP)	20 March 2022	Retiring from politics	
P102	Bangi	Ong Kian Ming	2013	PH (DAP)	9 May 2022	Not seeking re-election	
P046	Batu Kawan	Kasthuriraani Patto	2013	PH (DAP)	20 October 2022	Not seeking re-election	
P208	Sarikei	Wong Ling Biu	2013	PH (DAP)	23 October 2022	Dropped by party	
P110	Klang	Charles Santiago	2008	PH (DAP)	26 October 2022	Dropped by party	
P106	Damansara	Tony Pua Kiam Wee	2008	PH (DAP)	26 October 2022	Not seeking re-election	
P060	Taiping	Teh Kok Lim	2018	PH (DAP)	28 October 2022	Transferred to Aulong state seat	
P070	Kampar	Thomas Su Keong Siong	2013	PH (DAP)	28 October 2022	Transferred to Ketari state seat	
P048	Bukit Bendera	Wong Hon Wai	2018	PH (DAP)	30 October 2022	Transferred to Paya Terubong state seat	
P116	Wangsa Maju	Tan Yee Kew	1995	PH (PKR)	18 October 2022	Not seeking re-election	
P009	Alor Setar	Chan Ming Kai	2018	PH (PKR)	22 October 2022	Dropped by party	
P015	Sungai Petani	Johari Abdul	2008	PH (PKR)	28 October 2022	Dropped by party	
P071	Gopeng	Lee Boon Chye	2008	PH (PKR)	28 October 2022	Not seeking re-election	
P094	Hulu Selangor	June Leow Hsiad Hui	2018	PH (PKR)	28 October 2022	Dropped by party	
P105	Petaling Jaya	Maria Chin Abdullah	2018	PH (PKR)	28 October 2022	Dropped by party	
P107	Sungai Buloh	Sivarasa Rasiah	2018	PH (PKR)	28 October 2022	Dropped by party	
P141	Sekijang	Natrah Ismail	2018	PH (PKR)	28 October 2022	Dropped by party	
P219	Miri	Michael Teo Yu Keng	2013	PH (PKR)	1 November 2022	Dropped by party	
P017	Padang Serai	Karupaiya Mutusami	2018	PH (PKR)	16 November 2022	Died during campaigning period	
P133	Tampin	Hasan Bahrom	2018	PH (AMANAH)	18 October 2022	Not seeking re-election	
P088	Temerloh	Mohd Anuar Mohd Tahir	2018	PH (AMANAH)	25 October 2022	Health issues	
P101	Hulu Langat	Hasanuddin Mohd Yunus	2018	PH (AMANAH)	30 October 2022	Dropped by party	
P113	Sepang	Mohamed Hanipa Maidin	2013	PH (AMANAH)	30 October 2022	Health issues	
P042	Tasek Gelugor	Shabudin Yahaya	2013	PN (BERSATU)	18 June 2022	Not seeking re-election	
P167	Kudat	Abdul Rahim Bakri	2004	PN (BERSATU)	12 August 2022	Not seeking re-election	
P177	Beaufort	Azizah Mohd Dun	2004	PN (BERSATU)	12 August 2022	Not seeking re-election	
P154	Mersing	Abdul Latiff Ahmad	1999	PN (BERSATU)	16 October 2022	Not seeking re-election	
P058	Bagan Serai	Noor Azmi Ghazali	2013	PN (BERSATU)	1 November 2022	Dropped by party	
P030	Jeli	Mustapa Mohamed	1995	PN (BERSATU)	2 November 2022	Health issues	
P178	Sipitang	Yamani Hafez Musa	2018	PN (BERSATU)	2 November 2022	Dropped by party	
P184	Libaran	Zakaria Edris	2018	PN (BERSATU)	2 November 2022	Dropped by party	
P025	Bachok	Nik Mohamed Abduh Nik Abdul Aziz	2013	PN (PAS)	2 November 2022	Not seeking re-election	
P112	Kuala Langat	Xavier Jayakumar Arulanandam	2018	PBM	20 October 2022	Not seeking re-election	
P188	Lahad Datu	Mohamaddin Ketapi	2018	PBM	4 November 2022	Not seeking re-election	
P158	Tebrau	Steven Choong Shiau Yoon	2018	PBM	4 November 2022	Not seeking re-election	
P140	Segamat	Edmund Santhara Kumar	2018	PBM	5 November 2022	Not seeking re-election	
P193	Santubong	Wan Junaidi	1990	GPS (PBB)	30 October 2022	Not seeking re-election	
P201	Batang Lupar	Rohani Abdul Karim	1990	GPS (PBB)	3 November 2022	Dropped by party	
P204	Betong	Robert Lawson Chuat	2018	GPS (PBB)	3 November 2022	Dropped by party	
P185	Batu Sapi	Liew Vui Keong	2008	WARISAN	2 October 2020	Died in office	
P149	Sri Gading	Shahruddin Md Salleh	2018	GTA (PEJUANG)	2 November 2022	Dropped by party	

Members of the 14th Parliament who lost reelection in the 2022 election
No.	Constituency	Departing MP	First elected	Party
P007	Padang Terap	Mahdzir Khalid	2013	BN (UMNO)
P016	Baling	Abdul Azeez Abdul Rahim	2013	BN (UMNO)
P019	Tumpat	Che Abdullah Mat Nawi	2018	BN (UMNO)
P029	Machang	Ahmad Jazlan Yaakub	2013	BN (UMNO)
P032	Gua Musang	Tengku Razaleigh Hamzah	1964	BN (UMNO)
P041	Kepala Batas	Reezal Merican Naina Merican	2013	BN (UMNO)
P069	Parit	Mohd Nizar Zakaria	2008	BN (UMNO)
P087	Kuala Krau	Ismail Mohamed Said	2004	BN (UMNO)
P125	Putrajaya	Tengku Adnan Tengku Mansor	2004	BN (UMNO)
P131	Rembau	Khairy Jamaluddin	2008 (Note: Contested at Sungai Buloh.)	BN (UMNO)
P181	Tenom	Noorita Sual	2018	PH (DAP)
P002	Kangar	Noor Amin Ahmad	2018	PH (PKR)
P010	Kuala Kedah	Azman Ismail	2013	PH (PKR)
P014	Merbok	Nor Azrina Surip	2018	PH (PKR)
P018	Kulim-Bandar Baharu	Saifuddin Nasution Ismail	2008	PH (PKR)
P044	Permatang Pauh	Nurul Izzah Anwar	2008	PH (PKR)
P083	Kuantan	Fuziah Salleh	2008	PH (PKR)
P109	Kapar	Abdullah Sani Abdul Hamid	2008	PH (PKR)
P136	Tangga Batu	Rusnah Aluai	2018	PH (PKR)
P137	Hang Tuah Jaya	Shamsul Iskandar Md. Akin	2013 (Note: Contested in Bagan Datuk.)	PH (PKR)
P151	Simpang Renggam	Maszlee Malik	2018	PH (PKR)
P173	Putatan	Awang Husaini Sahari	2018	PH (PKR)
P190	Tawau	Christina Liew Chin Jin	2018	PH (PKR)
P008	Pokok Sena	Mahfuz Omar	1999	PH (AMANAH)
P057	Parit Buntar	Mujahid Yusof Rawa	2008	PH (AMANAH)
P074	Lumut	Mohd Hatta Ramli	2008	PH (AMANAH)
P108	Shah Alam	Khalid Samad	2008 (Note: Contested at Titiwangsa.)	PH (AMANAH)
P047	Nibong Tebal	Mansor Othman	2013	PN (BERSATU)
P063	Tambun	Ahmad Faizal Azumu	2018	PN (BERSATU)
P098	Gombak	Mohamed Azmin Ali	2008	PN (BERSATU)
P119	Titiwangsa	Rina Harun	2018 (Note: Contested at Sepang.)	PN (BERSATU)
P124	Bandar Tun Razak	Kamaruddin Jaffar	1999	PN (BERSATU)
P129	Kuala Pilah	Eddin Syazlee Shith	2018	PN (BERSATU)
P135	Alor Gajah	Mohd Redzuan Md Yusof	2018	PN (BERSATU)
P150	Batu Pahat	Mohd Rashid Hasnon	2018	PN (BERSATU)
P203	Lubok Antu	Jugah Muyang	2018	PN (BERSATU)
P099	Ampang	Zuraida Kamaruddin	2008	PBM
P004	Langkawi	Mahathir Mohamad	1964	GTA (PEJUANG)
P005	Jerlun	Mukhriz Mahathir	2008	GTA (PEJUANG)
P006	Kubang Pasu	Amiruddin Hamzah	2018	GTA (PEJUANG)
P166	Labuan	Rozman Isli	2013	WARISAN
P171	Sepanggar	Azis Jamman	2018	WARISAN
P174	Penampang	Ignatius Dorell Leiking	2013	WARISAN
P175	Papar	Ahmad Hassan	2018	WARISAN
P168	Kota Marudu	Maximus Ongkili	2004	GRS (PBS)
P214	Selangau	Baru Bian	2018 (Note: Contested at Lawas.)	PSB
P001	Padang Besar	Zahidi Zainul Abidin	2008	Independent
P089	Bentong	Wong Tack	2018	Independent
P202	Sri Aman	Masir Kujat	2008	Independent

== Opinion polls ==
=== National polls === === 2022 ===
Polling firm	Dates conducted	Sample size	PH	BN	PN	GPS	W	MUDA	GTA	Ind	Und	Lead	Ref
Vodus	12 – 18 November 2022	7,937	35%	28%	30%	3%	2%	–	1%	1%	0%	PH +5%	
YouGov	8 – 14 November 2022	2,687	35%	18%	21%	3%	1%	–	1%	3%	20%	PH +14%	
Merdeka Center	19 – 28 October 2022	1,209	26%	24%	13%	–	–	–	–	2%	35%	PH +2%	
IDE-Toyo University	21 – 28 October 2022	2,423	31%	28%	13%	–	–	–	–	–	29%	PH +3%	
O2 Malaysia	5 – 10 October 2022	1,105	39%	26%	17%	4%	3%	4%	1%	7%	–	PH +13%	
ISEAS/YouGov	5 – 30 September 2022	805 (Note: Involves ages 18–24 only.)	11%	19%	11%	–	–	9%	1%	–	43%	BN +8%	
Merdeka Center	as of 30 September 2022	–	27%	27%	9%	–	–	–	–	–	33%	Tie	
Ilham Centre	1 Aug – 30 September 2022	1,622	18%	35%	12%	–	–	–	–	15%	21%	BN +17%	
Merdeka Center	as of 30 July 2022	–	23%	28%	13%	–	–	–	–	–	37%	BN +5%	
Merdeka Center	as of 31 May 2022	–	26%	29%	14%	–	–	–	–	–	31%	BN +3%	
=== 2018–2021 ===
Polling firm	Dates conducted	Sample size	PH	BN	PN	GPS	W	MUDA	GTA	Ind	Und	Lead	Ref
Emir Research	August 2020	2,096	10%	47%	27%	2%	2%	–	6%	–	6%	BN +20%	
Emir Research (Note: Barisan Nasional was tallied as Muafakat Nasional.)	15 Jan – 25 February 2020	2,002	30%	53%	–	–	–	–	–	–	–	BN +23%	
Emir Research	5 Sep – 10 October 2019	1,992	43%	39%	–	–	–	–	–	17%	–	PH +3%	

=== Region polls ===
Polling firm	Dates conducted	Region	Sample size	PH	BN	PN	GPS	W	MUDA	GTA	Ind	Und	Lead	Ref
Vodus	12 – 18 November 2022	Peninsula	7,937	37%	30%	33%	–	–	–	–	0%	0%	PH +4%	
Vodus	12 – 18 November 2022	Sabah	7,937	21%	48%	13%	–	17%	–	–	1%	0%	BN / GRS +27%	
Vodus	12 – 18 November 2022	Sarawak	7,937	23%	0%	9%	54%	–	–	–	14%	0%	GPS +31%	
Merdeka Center	16 – 18 November 2022	Peninsula	5,497	34%	15%	20%	–	–	–	–	–	22%	PH +14%	
Endeavour-MGC	7 – 15 November 2022	Peninsula	1,068	34%	34%	30%	–	–	–	–	–	8%	Tie	
Merdeka Center	5 – 8 November 2022	Peninsula	1,067	35%	21%	22%	–	–	–	–	–	22%	PH +13%	
Vodus	21 Jul – 21 August 2022	Peninsula	74,582	20%	23%	16%	–	–	–	–	5%	37%	BN +3%	
Vodus	21 Jul – 21 August 2022	Sabah	74,582	14%	17%	13%	–	14%	–	–	5%	37%	BN +3%	
Vodus	21 Jul – 21 August 2022	Sarawak	74,582	17%	13%	14%	33%	–	–	–	4%	20%	GPS +16%	

== Results ==
Party or alliance		Votes	%	Seats	+/–
Pakatan Harapan	People's Justice Party	2,477,741	15.87	31	–16
Pakatan Harapan	Democratic Action Party	2,422,581	15.52	40	–2
Pakatan Harapan	National Trust Party	884,391	5.66	8	–3
Pakatan Harapan	Malaysian United Democratic Alliance	74,392	0.48	1	New
Pakatan Harapan	United Progressive Kinabalu Organisation	72,751	0.47	2	+1
Pakatan Harapan	Total	5,931,856	37.99	82	–19
Perikatan Nasional	Pan-Malaysian Islamic Party	2,378,811	15.24	43	+25
Perikatan Nasional	Malaysian United Indigenous Party	2,064,201	13.22	31	+17
Perikatan Nasional	Parti Gerakan Rakyat Malaysia	276,653	1.77	0	0
Perikatan Nasional	Total	4,719,665	30.23	74	+43
Barisan Nasional	United Malays National Organisation	2,539,061	16.26	26	–28
Barisan Nasional	Malaysian Chinese Association	684,104	4.38	2	+1
Barisan Nasional	Malaysian Indian Congress	168,014	1.08	1	–1
Barisan Nasional	Parti Bersatu Rakyat Sabah	23,877	0.15	1	0
Barisan Nasional	Malaysian Indian Muslim Congress	21,468	0.14	0	0
Barisan Nasional	Malaysia Makkal Sakti Party	10,660	0.07	0	0
Barisan Nasional	All Malaysian Indian Progressive Front	7,387	0.05	0	0
Barisan Nasional	Love Malaysia Party	5,417	0.03	0	0
Barisan Nasional	Total	3,459,988	22.16	30	–28
Gabungan Parti Sarawak	Parti Pesaka Bumiputera Bersatu	343,954	2.20	14	+1
Gabungan Parti Sarawak	Sarawak United Peoples' Party	167,063	1.07	2	+1
Gabungan Parti Sarawak	Progressive Democratic Party	84,045	0.54	2	0
Gabungan Parti Sarawak	Parti Rakyat Sarawak	67,539	0.43	5	+2
Gabungan Parti Sarawak	Total	662,601	4.24	23	+4
Heritage Party		281,611	1.80	3	–5
Gabungan Rakyat Sabah	Direct members of GRS	94,413	0.60	4	+4
Gabungan Rakyat Sabah	United Sabah Party	65,311	0.42	1	0
Gabungan Rakyat Sabah	Homeland Solidarity Party	29,874	0.19	1	0
Gabungan Rakyat Sabah	Sabah Progressive Party	5,054	0.03	0	0
Gabungan Rakyat Sabah	Total	194,652	1.25	6	+4
Gerakan Tanah Air	Homeland Fighter's Party	79,594	0.51	0	0
Gerakan Tanah Air	Parti Bumiputera Perkasa Malaysia	16,360	0.10	0	0
Gerakan Tanah Air	Pan-Malaysian Islamic Front	11,386	0.07	0	0
Gerakan Tanah Air	National Indian Muslim Alliance Party	4,530	0.03	0	0
Gerakan Tanah Air	Total	111,870	0.72	0	0
Sarawak United; People's Alliance	Parti Sarawak Bersatu	57,579	0.37	0	–1
Sarawak United; People's Alliance	Parti Bansa Dayak Sarawak Baru	3,053	0.02	0	0
Sarawak United; People's Alliance	Parti Bumi Kenyalang	2,311	0.01	0	0
Sarawak United; People's Alliance	Total	62,943	0.40	0	–1
Social Democratic Harmony Party		52,054	0.33	1	New
Parti Bangsa Malaysia		16,437	0.11	1	–5
PSM–PRM informal coalition	Parti Rakyat Malaysia	6,293	0.04	0	0
PSM–PRM informal coalition	Socialist Party of Malaysia	779	0.00	0	0
PSM–PRM informal coalition	Total	7,072	0.05	0	0
Sarawak People's Awareness Party		1,036	0.01	0	0
Sabah People's Unity Party		541	0.00	0	0
People's First Party		264	0.00	0	0
Independents		111,390	0.71	2	–1
Total		15,613,980	100.00	222	0
Valid votes		15,613,980	98.71		
Invalid/blank votes		203,327	1.29		
Total votes		15,817,307	100.00		
Registered voters/turnout		21,173,638	74.70		
Source: ElectionData.MY

=== By alliance ===
State or federal territory	PH + MUDA		PN		BN + GRS		GPS		Other		Total
State or federal territory	Votes	%	Votes	%	Votes	%	Votes	%	Votes	%	Total
Perlis	29,317	19.77	80,287	54.15	35,365	23.85	–	n/a	3,308	2.23	148,277
Kedah	281,523	23.28	664,720	54.96	235,353	19.46	–	n/a	27,943	2.31	1,209,539
Kelantan	87,321	8.80	631,751	63.66	265,930	26.79	–	n/a	7,406	0.75	992,408
Terengganu	40,645	5.50	461,509	62.34	234,392	31.71	–	n/a	3,270	0.44	739,816
Penang	566,245	59.99	226,173	23.96	143,398	15.19	–	n/a	8,155	0.86	943,971
Perak	641,235	43.29	456,801	30.84	370,809	25.02	–	n/a	13,413	0.91	1,482,258
Pahang	199,859	22.90	330,904	37.91	335,062	38.39	–	n/a	7,001	0.80	872,826
Selangor	1,547,383	52.80	806,903	27.54	509,856	17.40	–	n/a	66,134	2.26	2,930,276
Kuala Lumpur	535,527	62.62	166,056	19.42	136,720	15.99	–	n/a	16,891	1.98	855,194
Putrajaya	5,988	16.34	16,002	43.67	13,692	37.37	–	n/a	961	2.62	36,643
Negeri Sembilan	295,789	44.86	144,836	21.96	212,167	32.17	–	n/a	6,633	1.01	659,425
Malacca	199,267	38.69	159,238	30.92	152,613	29.63	–	n/a	3,923	0.76	515,041
Johor	825,182	42.26	519,661	26.62	598,244	30.64	–	n/a	9,371	0.48	1,952,458
Labuan	5,307	18.67	8,124	28.59	7,416	26.10	–	n/a	7,572	26.64	28,419
Sabah	294,676	27.58	11,303	1.06	403,623	37.77	–	n/a	370,233	34.65	1,068,532
Sarawak	376,592	31.95	35,397	3.00	–	n/a	662,601	56.21	104,277	8.85	1,178,867
Total	5,931,856	38.23	4,719,665	30.41	3,459,988	22.30	662,601	4.27	643,551	4.12	15,518,026
Source: Election Commission of Malaysia (SPR)

=== By parliamentary seats ===
State or federal territory	PH + MUDA			PN			BN + GRS			GPS			Other			Total
State or federal territory	Seats	%	+/–	Seats	%	+/–	Seats	%	+/–	Seats	%	+/–	Seats	%	+/–	Total
Perlis	0	n/a	▼1	3	100	▲3	0	n/a	▼2	–	n/a	0	0	n/a	0	3
Kedah	1	6.67	▼9	14	93.33	▲11	0	n/a	▼2	–	n/a	0	0	n/a	▼3	15
Kelantan	0	0	0	14	100	▲3	0	n/a	▼3	–	n/a	0	0	n/a	0	14
Terengganu	0	0	0	8	100	▲2	0	n/a	▼2	–	n/a	0	0	n/a	0	8
Penang	10	76.92	Steady	3	23.08	▲1	0	n/a	▼1	–	n/a	0	0	n/a	0	13
Perak	11	45.83	▼1	10	41.67	▲6	3	12.50	▼5	–	n/a	0	0	n/a	0	24
Pahang	2	14.29	▼2	7	50.00	▲6	5	35.71	▼4	–	n/a	0	0	n/a	0	14
Selangor	16	72.72	Steady	6	27.28	▲3	0	n/a	▼1	–	n/a	0	0	n/a	▼2	22
Kuala Lumpur	10	90.90	▲1	0	n/a	▼2	1	9.10	▲1	–	n/a	0	0	n/a	0	11
Putrajaya	0	n/a	0	1	100	▲1	0	n/a	1	–	n/a	0	0	n/a	0	1
Negeri Sembilan	3	37.50	▼1	0	n/a	▼1	5	62.50	▲2	–	n/a	0	0	n/a	0	8
Malacca	3	50.00	0	3	50.00	▲1	0	n/a	▼1	–	n/a	0	0	n/a	0	6
Johor	15	57.69	▲3	2	7.69	▼1	9	34.62	▲1	–	n/a	0	0	n/a	▼3	26
Labuan	0	n/a	0	1	100	▲1	0	n/a	▼1	–	n/a	0	0	n/a	0	1
Sabah	5	20.00	▼1	1	4.00	▲1	13	52.00	▲8	–	n/a	0	6	24.00	▼8	25
Sarawak	6	19.35	▼1	1	3.23	Steady	0	n/a	Steady	23	74.19	▲4	1	3.23	▼3	31
Total	82	36.94	▼9	73	32.88	▲36	30	13.51	▼11	23	10.36	▲4	7	3.15	▼17	222
Source: Election Commission of Malaysia (SPR)

=== State assemblies ===
State / Federal Territory	Barisan Nasional					Pakatan Harapan + Malaysian United Democratic Alliance					Perikatan Nasional					Gerakan Tanah Air					Others / Independents				
State / Federal Territory	Votes	%	Seats	%	±!	Votes	%	Seats	%	±!	Votes	%	Seats	%	±!	Votes	%	Seats	%	±!	Votes	%	Seats	%	±!
Pahang	337,533	38.75	17	38.10	▼8	188,230	21.61	8	19.05	▼1	340,378	39.07	17	40.48	▲9	4,929	0.58	0	0.00	Steady	2,125	0.25	0	0.00	Steady
Perak	380,816	20.38	9	15.25	▼18	624,594	42.35	24	40.68	▼4	456,034	30.92	26	44.07	▲22	4,277	0.00	0	0.00	Steady	9,244	0.00	0	0.00	Steady
Perlis	36,301	24.49	0	0.00	▼10	27,856	18.79	1	6.67	▼2	77,504	52.29	14	93.33	▲12	905	0.00	0	0.00	Steady	5,646	0.00	0	0.00	Steady

=== Seats that changed allegiance ===
No.	Seat	Previous Party (2018)	Current Party (2022)
P001	(Perlis) Padang Besar	Barisan Nasional (UMNO)	Perikatan Nasional (PAS)
P002	(Perlis) Kangar	Pakatan Harapan (PKR)	Perikatan Nasional (BERSATU)
P003	(Perlis) Arau	Barisan Nasional (UMNO)	Perikatan Nasional (PAS)
P004	(Kedah) Langkawi	Pakatan Harapan (BERSATU)	Perikatan Nasional (BERSATU)
P005	(Kedah) Jerlun	Pakatan Harapan (BERSATU)	Perikatan Nasional (PAS)
P006	(Kedah) Kubang Pasu	Pakatan Harapan (BERSATU)	Perikatan Nasional (BERSATU)
P007	(Kedah) Padang Terap	Barisan Nasional (UMNO)	Perikatan Nasional (PAS)
P008	(Kedah) Pokok Sena	Pakatan Harapan (AMANAH)	Perikatan Nasional (PAS)
P009	(Kedah) Alor Setar	Pakatan Harapan (PKR)	Perikatan Nasional (PAS)
P010	Kuala Kedah	Pakatan Harapan (PKR)	Perikatan Nasional (PAS)
P014	(Kedah) Merbok	Pakatan Harapan (PKR)	Perikatan Nasional (BERSATU)
P016	(Kedah) Baling	Barisan Nasional (UMNO)	Perikatan Nasional (PAS)
P017	(Kedah) Padang Serai	Pakatan Harapan (PKR)	Perikatan Nasional (BERSATU)
P018	(Kedah) Kulim-Bandar Baharu	Pakatan Harapan (PKR)	Perikatan Nasional (BERSATU)
P026	(Kelantan) Ketereh	Barisan Nasional (UMNO)	Perikatan Nasional (BERSATU)
P027	(Kelantan) Tanah Merah	Barisan Nasional (UMNO)	Perikatan Nasional (BERSATU)
P029	(Kelantan) Machang	Barisan Nasional (UMNO)	Perikatan Nasional (BERSATU)
P030	(Kelantan) Jeli	Barisan Nasional (UMNO)	Perikatan Nasional (BERSATU)
P032	(Kelantan) Gua Musang	Barisan Nasional (UMNO)	Perikatan Nasional (BERSATU)
P033	(Terengganu) Besut	Barisan Nasional (UMNO)	Perikatan Nasional (PAS)
P038	Hulu Terengganu	Barisan Nasional (UMNO)	Perikatan Nasional (BERSATU)
P041	(Penang) Kepala Batas	Barisan Nasional (UMNO)	Perikatan Nasional (PAS)
P042	(Penang) Tasek Gelugor	Barisan Nasional (UMNO)	Perikatan Nasional (BERSATU)
P044	(Penang) Permatang Pauh	Pakatan Harapan (PKR)	Perikatan Nasional (PAS)
P054	(Perak) Gerik	Barisan Nasional (UMNO)	Perikatan Nasional (BERSATU)
P056	(Perak) Larut	Barisan Nasional (UMNO)	Perikatan Nasional (BERSATU)
P057	(Perak) Parit Buntar	Pakatan Harapan (AMANAH)	Perikatan Nasional (PAS)
P058	(Perak) Bagan Serai	Barisan Nasional (UMNO)	Perikatan Nasional (PAS)
P059	(Perak) Bukit Gantang	Barisan Nasional (UMNO)	Perikatan Nasional (BERSATU)
P061	(Perak) Padang Rengas	Barisan Nasional (UMNO)	Perikatan Nasional (BERSATU)
P063	(Perak) Tambun	Pakatan Harapan (BERSATU)	Pakatan Harapan (PKR)
P067	(Perak) Kuala Kangsar	Barisan Nasional (UMNO)	Perikatan Nasional (BERSATU)
P069	(Perak) Parit	Barisan Nasional (UMNO)	Perikatan Nasional (PAS)
P073	(Perak) Pasir Salak	Barisan Nasional (UMNO)	Perikatan Nasional (PAS)
P074	(Perak) Lumut	Pakatan Harapan (AMANAH)	Perikatan Nasional (BERSATU)
P081	(Pahang) Jerantut	Barisan Nasional (UMNO)	Perikatan Nasional (PAS)
P082	(Pahang) Indera Mahkota	Pakatan Harapan (PKR)	Perikatan Nasional (BERSATU)
P083	(Pahang) Kuantan	Pakatan Harapan (PKR)	Perikatan Nasional (PAS)
P086	(Pahang) Maran	Barisan Nasional (UMNO)	Perikatan Nasional (PAS)
P087	(Pahang) Kuala Krau	Barisan Nasional (UMNO)	Perikatan Nasional (PAS)
P088	(Pahang) Temerloh	Pakatan Harapan (AMANAH)	Perikatan Nasional (PAS)
P091	(Pahang) Rompin	Barisan Nasional (UMNO)	Perikatan Nasional (BERSATU)
P092	(Selangor) Sabak Bernam	Barisan Nasional (UMNO)	Perikatan Nasional (BERSATU)
P093	(Selangor) Sungai Besar	Pakatan Harapan (BERSATU)	Perikatan Nasional (BERSATU)
P094	Hulu Selangor	Pakatan Harapan (PKR)	Perikatan Nasional (PAS)
P095	(Selangor) Tanjong Karang	Barisan Nasional (UMNO)	Perikatan Nasional (BERSATU)
P109	(Selangor) Kapar	Pakatan Harapan (PKR)	Perikatan Nasional (PAS)
P112	(Selangor) Kuala Langat	Pakatan Harapan (PKR)	Perikatan Nasional (PAS)
P115	(Kuala Lumpur) Batu	Independent	Pakatan Harapan (PKR)
P119	(Kuala Lumpur) Titiwangsa	Pakatan Harapan (BERSATU)	Barisan Nasional (UMNO)
P125	Putrajaya	Barisan Nasional (UMNO)	Perikatan Nasional (BERSATU)
P129	(Negeri Sembilan) Kuala Pilah	Pakatan Harapan (BERSATU)	Barisan Nasional (UMNO)
P133	(Negeri Sembilan) Tampin	Pakatan Harapan (AMANAH)	Barisan Nasional (UMNO)
P134	(Malacca) Masjid Tanah	Barisan Nasional (UMNO)	Perikatan Nasional (BERSATU)
P135	(Malacca) Alor Gajah	Pakatan Harapan (BERSATU)	Pakatan Harapan (AMANAH)
P136	(Malacca) Tangga Batu	Pakatan Harapan (PKR)	Perikatan Nasional (PAS)
P139	(Malacca) Jasin	Barisan Nasional (UMNO)	Perikatan Nasional (PAS)
P143	(Johor) Pagoh	Pakatan Harapan (BERSATU)	Perikatan Nasional (BERSATU)
P146	(Johor) Muar	Pakatan Harapan (BERSATU)	MUDA
P149	(Johor) Sri Gading	Pakatan Harapan (BERSATU)	Pakatan Harapan (AMANAH)
P151	(Johor) Simpang Renggam	Pakatan Harapan (BERSATU)	Barisan Nasional (UMNO)
P154	(Johor) Mersing	Barisan Nasional (UMNO)	Perikatan Nasional (BERSATU)
P165	(Johor) Tanjung Piai	Pakatan Harapan (BERSATU)	Barisan Nasional (MCA)
P167	(Sabah) Kudat	Barisan Nasional (UMNO)	Independent
P168	(Sabah) Kota Marudu	Barisan Nasional (PBS)	KDM
P170	(Sabah) Tuaran	Barisan Nasional (UPKO)	Pakatan Harapan (UPKO)
P171	(Sabah) Sepanggar	WARISAN	Pakatan Harapan (PKR)
P173	(Sabah) Putatan	Pakatan Harapan (PKR)	Barisan Nasional (UMNO)
P174	(Sabah) Penampang	WARISAN	Pakatan Harapan (UPKO)
P175	(Sabah) Papar	WARISAN	Gabungan Rakyat Sabah (Direct member)
P178	(Sabah) Sipitang	Barisan Nasional (UMNO)	Gabungan Rakyat Sabah (Direct member)
P179	(Sabah) Ranau	Pakatan Harapan (PKR)	Gabungan Rakyat Sabah (Direct member)
P180	(Sabah) Keningau	United Sabah Alliance (STAR)	Gabungan Rakyat Sabah (STAR)
P181	(Sabah) Tenom	Pakatan Harapan (DAP)	Independent
P183	(Sabah) Beluran	Barisan Nasional (UMNO)	Perikatan Nasional (BERSATU)
P185	(Sabah) Batu Sapi	WARISAN	Gabungan Rakyat Sabah (Direct member)
P190	(Sabah) Tawau	Pakatan Harapan (PKR)	Gabungan Rakyat Sabah (PBS)
P191	(Sabah) Kalabakan	WARISAN	Barisan Nasional (UMNO)
P198	(Sarawak) Puncak Borneo	Pakatan Harapan (PKR)	Gabungan Parti Sarawak (PBB)
P203	(Sarawak) Lubok Antu	Independent	Gabungan Parti Sarawak (PRS)
P205	(Sarawak) Saratok	Pakatan Harapan (PKR)	Perikatan Nasional (BERSATU)
P208	(Sarawak) Sarikei	Pakatan Harapan (DAP)	Gabungan Parti Sarawak (SUPP)
P209	(Sarawak) Julau	Independent	Parti Bangsa Malaysia
P214	(Sarawak) Selangau	Pakatan Harapan (PKR)	Gabungan Parti Sarawak (PRS)

== Aftermath ==
=== Formation of federal government ===
In the general election, no individual alliance won the required 112 seats needed for a majority in the Dewan Rakyat to form the next government.

On 19 November, Gabungan Parti Sarawak (GPS) leader Abang Johari said that his party would work together with Perikatan Nasional (PN), Barisan Nasional (BN) and Gabungan Rakyat Sabah (GRS) to form the government. PN leader Muhyiddin Yassin also claimed to have a sufficient majority to be appointed as prime minister, citing support from PN, BN, GPS and GRS. However, BN leader Ahmad Zahid Hamidi said that BN had not negotiated with GPS or PN on forming a government with BN, while also stating that BN MPs already agreed to let him decide who BN would ally with to form a government.

On 20 November, In a press conference at around 3:00 a.m. Pakatan Harapan (PH) leader Anwar Ibrahim claimed to have secured a simple majority of 111 seats a to form the next government, but refused to mention which other parties were cooperating. This came not long after Perikatan Nasional chairman Muhyiddin Yassin hinted at being able to form a coalition government but rejected working with PH.

On 21 November, PH leaders and BN leaders met at the Seri Pacific Hotel. Also on 21 November, the deadline for political parties to prove their majority in Parliament to form a government and nominate a prime minister was extended for 24 hours by the Yang di-Pertuan Agong, shifting the deadline to the next day. Meanwhile, Hamzah Zainudin of PN said that PN submitted over 112 statutory declarations from MPs supporting Muhyiddin for prime minister.

On 22 November, Ismail Sabri Yaakob of BN stated that BN would not support either PH or PN to form a government and was prepared to sit in opposition. Meanwhile, after discontent from Sarawak over GPS working with PN, GPS stated that it was up to the Yang di-Pertuan Agong to appoint the Prime Minister; while Parti Warisan voiced support for a government with PH and BN. Also that day, the royal palace stated that after the Yang di-Pertuan Agong reviewed the nominations for prime minister, he found that "no member of parliament has the majority support to be appointed prime minister", so the Yang di-Pertuan Agong summoned Anwar and Muhyiddin to meet him. After the meeting, Muhyiddin said that the Yang di-Pertuan Agong proposed a unity government between Pakatan Harapan and Perikatan National with a rotation arrangement of the prime minister's post between Anwar and Muhyiddin. However, Muhyiddin rejected it as Perikatan National "will not cooperate" with Pakatan Harapan; while Anwar acknowledged that the prime minister had yet to be determined, while stating that "given time, I think we will secure a simple majority".

On 23 November, the Yang di-Pertuan Agong met with BN and GPS leaders in the royal palace. Meanwhile, some members of BN and PN met in St Regis Hotel.

On 24 November, Ahmad Maslan of UMNO stated that the party's supreme council has agreed to follow the wishes of the Yang di-Pertuan Agong for BN to join a unity government not led by PN. Meanwhile, Perikatan Nasional would consider forming a unity government, stated its secretary-general Hamzah Zainudin; while GRS leader Hajiji Noor stated that GRS would abide by the Yang di-Pertuan Agong's wishes on forming a new government, including if a unity government was formed. Also, DAP secretary-general Anthony Loke publicly apologised on behalf of his party to the Sarawak government and Sarawak people for any offensive statement by a DAP leader, while DAP chairman Lim Guan Eng apologised as well for "my remarks that may have offended the Sarawak Premier and the GPS Sarawak state government", calling for "a fresh start to cooperate together".

Later on 24 November, the royal palace announced that PH chairman Anwar Ibrahim was appointed as prime minister by the Yang di-Pertuan Agong, Al-Sultan Abdullah, after the Agong conducted a consultation with the Conference of Rulers of Malaysia. Anwar was sworn in at 5 pm that day, making him Malaysia's 10th prime minister. However, Muhyiddin continued to insist that he had the support of a majority of 115 MPs to form the next government and called on Anwar to prove Anwar's majority; this led to former prime minister Najib Razak calling for Muhyiddin himself to prove his 115 MP majority. As of 24 November, Anwar has received support from MPs from PH, BN, GPS, Warisan, MUDA and PBM, as well as independent MPs. Anwar has pledged to hold a vote of confidence on 19 December 2022, once MPs are sworn into Parliament.

On 25 November, both Anwar and GRS leader Hajiji Noor stated that GRS had joined the unity government, supporting Anwar; this resulted in Anwar becoming the first prime minister since Abdullah Ahmad Badawi in 2008 to have two-thirds majority support in Parliament. Meanwhile, Muhyiddin congratulated Anwar and acknowledged him as prime minister, thanked Anwar for inviting PN to join the unity government, and declined Anwar's invitation, stating that PN would play the role of a "credible opposition" to ensure "corruption-free governance".

Anwar Ibrahim received the vote of confidence of the parliament by voice vote on 19 December.

=== International reactions ===
Following the formation of unity government and the appointment of Anwar as prime minister, organisations such as the European Union, the United Nations, as well as various head of states and their representative including from Afghanistan, Australia, Austria, Bahrain, Bangladesh, Brazil, Canada, China, East Timor, Finland, Germany, India, Iran, Japan, Maldives, New Zealand, Pakistan, Qatar, Russia, Saudi Arabia, Somalia, South Korea, Sri Lanka, Sudan, Taiwan, Turkey, the United Arab Emirates, the United Kingdom, the United States, and Yemen sent their congratulatory messages.

Some of the head of states of neighbouring ASEAN countries also congratulated Anwar:

- Brunei: The Sultan of Brunei, Hassanal Bolkiah, sent a congratulatory message to Anwar Ibrahim on 25 November 2022. In the message, he expressed confidence that Anwar's leadership and integrity would allow Malaysia to enjoy "continuous development" for the prosperity of its people, and conveyed his desire to further strengthen the close relations between the two countries.
- Indonesia: The President of Indonesia, Joko Widodo, personally congratulated Anwar Ibrahim through a telephone call on 24 November 2022. Jokowi expressed his wish to meet Anwar "as soon as possible" while Anwar reiterated that Indonesia has been "Malaysia's true ally", further adding that the two countries should continue to deepen economic and cultural cooperation.
- Philippines: The President of the Philippines, Bongbong Marcos extended his well wishes to Anwar Ibrahim through a tweet, describing the latter as his good friend and looking forward to the stability that Anwar's leadership provides for Malaysia as well as for the whole ASEAN region.
- Singapore: The Prime Minister of Singapore, Lee Hsien Loong, sent a congratulatory letter to Anwar Ibrahim on 24 November 2022, shortly after the Istana Negara confirmed Anwar's appointment as the new prime minister. In the letter, Lee congratulated his Pakatan Harapan coalition for their "strong performance" in the election, and noted the "longstanding substantive relationship" between the two countries, adding that the two countries could "do much more together to enhance openness, stability and connectivity" in their bilateral relationship. On 25 November, Lee called Anwar to reiterate his congratulations, and invited him to visit Singapore soon; in return, Anwar replied to Lee on Twitter that he would be looking forward to meeting him "at the earliest opportunity".
- Thailand: The Prime Minister of Thailand, Prayut Chan-o-cha, sent a congratulatory message on 4 December 2022 to Anwar on becoming the 10th prime minister of Malaysia. In the message, Prayut was looking forward with Anwar to further enhance bilateral relations between the two countries in both regional and international levels. Earlier, the Deputy Prime Minister of Thailand and Health Minister, Anutin Charnvirakul posted a congratulatory message with a video of him and Anwar through his official Facebook account on 26 November 2022. In his message, he wish "may the dual relationship of our two countries soar greater than ever before".
- Vietnam: The Prime Minister of Vietnam, Pham Minh Chinh, sent a message of congratulations to Anwar on 25 November 2022.

== See also ==
- 2018 Malaysian general election
- 2020–2022 Malaysian political crisis
- 2022 Malaysian state elections
  - 2022 Perlis state election
  - 2022 Perak state election
  - 2022 Pahang state election
- 2022 Bugaya by-election
- 2023 Malaysian state elections
