= Noor Amin Ahmad =

Malaysian politician

- نور أمين أحمد

Member of the Malaysian Parliament for Kangar
- In office 9 May 2018 – 19 November 2022
- Preceded by: Shaharuddin Ismail (BN–UMNO)
- Succeeded by: Zakri Hassan (PN–BERSATU)
- Majority: 5,603 (2018)

State Chairman of the Pakatan Harapan of Perlis
- Incumbent
- Assumed office 10 May 2021
- National Chairman: Anwar Ibrahim
- Preceded by: Ameir Hassan

Other roles
- 2023–: Chairman of Malaysian Institute of Translation and Books

Personal details
- Born: Noor Amin bin Ahmad; 20 February 1982 (age 44) Kangar, Perlis, Malaysia
- Citizenship: Malaysian
- Party: People's Justice Party (PKR)
- Other political affiliations: Pakatan Harapan (PH)
- Education: Universiti Putra Malaysia
- Occupation: Politician

Noor Amin bin Ahmad (born 20 February 1982) is a Malaysian politician who served as the Member of Parliament (MP) for Kangar from May 2018 to November 2022. He is a member of the People's Justice Party (PKR), a component party of the Pakatan Harapan (PH) coalition. He has served the State Chairman of PH of Perlis since May 2021.

== Political career ==
In the 2013 election, Amin represented the People's Justice Party (PKR) and faced Mat Hassan of the Barisan Nasional Party for the Kuala Perlis state seat. He lost with a majority vote of 1,384.

In the 2018 election, he represented the PKR party and won the Kangar parliamentary seat, defeating Barisan Nasional candidate Ramli Shariff and giving BN its first defeat for a parliamentary seat in Perlis state since independence.

== Election results ==
Perlis State Legislative Assembly
| Year | Constituency | Candidate | Votes | Pct | Opponent(s) | Votes | Pct | Ballots cast | Majority | Turnout |
|---|---|---|---|---|---|---|---|---|---|---|
| 2013 | N09 Kuala Perlis | Noor Amin Ahmad (PKR) | 3,374 | 40.54% | Mat Hassan (UMNO) | 4,758 | 57.17% | 8,323 | 1,384 | 83.55% |
| 2013 | N09 Kuala Perlis | Noor Amin Ahmad (PKR) | 3,374 | 40.54% | Shaari Ludin (IND) | 191 | 2.29% | 8,323 | 1,384 | 83.55% |

Parliament of Malaysia
| Year | Constituency | Candidate | Votes | Pct | Opponent(s) | Votes | Pct | Ballots cast | Majority | Turnout |
|---|---|---|---|---|---|---|---|---|---|---|
| 2018 | P002 Kangar | Noor Amin Ahmad (PKR) | 20,909 | 46.80% | Ramli Shariff (UMNO) | 15,306 | 34.26% | 45,703 | 5,603 | 81.70% |
| 2018 | P002 Kangar | Noor Amin Ahmad (PKR) | 20,909 | 46.80% | Zahid Ibrahim (PAS) | 8,465 | 18.95% | 45,703 | 5,603 | 81.70% |
| 2022 | P002 Kangar | Noor Amin Ahmad (PKR) | 15,143 | 26.94% | Zakri Hassan (BERSATU) | 24,562 | 43.70% | 56,200 | 9,192 | 75.07% |
| 2022 | P002 Kangar | Noor Amin Ahmad (PKR) | 15,143 | 26.94% | Fathul Bari Mat Jahya (UMNO) | 15,370 | 27.35% | 56,200 | 9,192 | 75.07% |
| 2022 | P002 Kangar | Noor Amin Ahmad (PKR) | 15,143 | 26.94% | Nur Sulaiman Zolkapli (PEJUANG) | 708 | 1.26% | 56,200 | 9,192 | 75.07% |
| 2022 | P002 Kangar | Noor Amin Ahmad (PKR) | 15,143 | 26.94% | Rohimi Shapiee (WARISAN) | 417 | 0.74% | 56,200 | 9,192 | 75.07% |
