= Mohd Radzi Sheikh Ahmad =

Malaysian politician

Yang Berbahagia Tan Sri Dato' Seri Mohd Radzi Sheikh Ahmad PSM SPMP DPMP SSAP
- محمد رضي شيخ احمد

Secretary-general of the UMNO
- In office 1 June 2004 – 20 March 2008
- President: Abdullah Ahmad Badawi
- Preceded by: Mohd Khalil Yaakob
- Succeeded by: Tengku Adnan Tengku Mansor

Ministerial roles
- 1982–1983: Parliamentary Secretary of National and Rural Development
- 1983–1986: Deputy Minister of Home Affairs
- 1986–1987: Deputy Minister of Primary Industries
- 2004–2006: Minister in the Prime Minister's Department
- 2006–2008: Minister of Home Affairs

Faction represented in Dewan Rakyat
- 1982–1989: Barisan Nasional
- 1989–1990: Parti Melayu Semangat 46
- 2004–2013: Barisan Nasional

Faction represented in Dewan Negara
- 2020: Malaysian United Indigenous Party
- 2020–2022: Perikatan Nasional

Personal details
- Born: Mohd Radzi bin Sheikh Ahmad; 24 February 1942 (age 84) Kangar, Perlis, Japanese occupation of Malaya (now Malaysia)
- Citizenship: Malaysian
- Party: Malaysian United Indigenous Party (BERSATU) (2018–present); United Malays National Organisation (UMNO) (1982–1988; 1996–2018); Parti Melayu Semangat 46 (S46) (1989–1996)
- Other political affiliations: Perikatan Nasional (PN) (2020–present); Pakatan Harapan (PH) (2018–2020); BN (1982–1988; 1996–2018); GR / APU (1989–1996)
- Spouse(s): Ellisha Abdullah; Mahani Abdul Hamid
- Education: Royal Military College
- Alma mater: Inns of Court Middle Temple
- Occupation: Politician
- Profession: Footballer, Lawyer

Mohd Radzi bin Sheikh Ahmad (Jawi: محمد رضي بن شيخ احمد; born 24 February 1942) is a Malaysian former footballer, lawyer, and politician. He was the member of Parliament (MP) of Malaysia for the seat of Kangar in Perlis twice (1982–1990 and 2004–2013) and has served as a senator in Dewan Negara. He was also the Minister in the Prime Minister's Department for Legal Affairs (2004–2006) and Minister of Home Affairs (2006–2008). Presently, he is a member of Malaysian United Indigenous Party or Parti Pribumi Bersatu Malaysia (BERSATU), a component of Perikatan Nasional (PN) coalition, after his resignation from United Malays National Organisation (UMNO) of Barisan Nasional (BN) for the second time in 2018.

== Background and formal education ==
Radzi is the son of former Menteri Besar of Perlis, the late Tan Sri Sheikh Ahmad Mohd Hashim. Radzi received his early education at Sekolah Melayu Kangar in 1948. He then continued his secondary education at Derma English School in 1952 before entering Royal Military College, Port Dickson in 1957. In 1961, he took Barrister-at-Law, Inns of Court in Middle Temple, London.

== Early legal and football career ==
Radzi had served in the Jurisdiction Department as a deputy public prosecutor in Selangor and later as the president of Session Court in Klang before he left to start his own legal firm.

Radzi was a footballer of Perlis state. He represented the nation and was a goal scorer during his youth career in the 1960 AFC Youth Championship, which was held in Malaya where the national team finished as runner-up to eventual winner South Korea.

== Politics ==
Radzi was first elected to Parliament in 1982. He has held various ministries, including deputy minister in the Prime Minister's Department (1983–1984) and deputy minister for the Primary Industries Ministry (1984–1986).

Radzi joined the Parti Melayu Semangat 46 (S46) in 1989 before rejoining UMNO in 1996 after S46 was dissolved.

Radzi was picked as UMNO secretary-general on 1 June 2004 by the then UMNO president Abdullah Ahmad Badawi. He was appointed minister for home affairs in February 2006, but in March 2008 was dropped from the Cabinet. He also resigned as the secretary-general of UMNO and BN on 20 March 2008, saying he would not be able to work effectively without a Cabinet post. He was dropped from UMNO's list of candidates for the 2013 general election (GE13), replaced by Shaharuddin Ismail.

In December 2018, Radzi quit UMNO again and joined Malaysian United Indigenous Party (BERSATU) which is part of new Pakatan Harapan (PH) government following the fall of BN and UMNO in the earlier May 2018 general election (GE14). He was then made a senator after the Sheraton Move by BERSATU led Perikatan Nasional (PN) and sworn in on 17 June 2020.

== Personal life ==
Radzi married first Ellisha Abdullah, an Irish who died in an accident in 1984 and the couple has five children. He is married second time to Mahani Abdul Hamid and they have three children.

== Election results ==
Parliament of Malaysia
| Year | Constituency | Candidate | Votes | Pct | Opponent(s) | Votes | Pct | Ballots cast | Majority | Turnout |
|---|---|---|---|---|---|---|---|---|---|---|
| 1982 | P001 Kangar | Mohd Radzi Sheikh Ahmad (UMNO) | 22,251 | 71.51% | Musa Mohamed (PAS) | 8,866 | 28.49% | 32,396 | 13,385 | 77.16% |
| 1986 | P001 Kangar | Mohd Radzi Sheikh Ahmad (UMNO) | 22,463 | 68.93% | Shuib Mohammad (PAS) | 9,397 | 28.83% | 32,590 | 13,066 | 72.29% |
| 1995 | P004 Langkawi | Mohd Radzi Sheikh Ahmad (S46) | 3,552 | 22.87% | Abu Bakar Taib (UMNO) | 11,977 | 77.13% | 16,532 | 8,425 | 76.12% |
| 2004 | P002 Kangar | Mohd Radzi Sheikh Ahmad (UMNO) | 22,498 | 67.98% | Ishar Saad (PAS) | 9,950 | 30.07% | 33,095 | 12,548 | 81.68% |
| 2008 | P002 Kangar | Mohd Radzi Sheikh Ahmad (UMNO) | 23,821 | 68.17% | Tunku Abdul Rahman Tunku Ismail (PKR) | 10,150 | 29.04% | 34,946 | 13,671 | 80.17% |

== Honours ==
=== Honours of Malaysia ===
- Malaysia
  - Commander of the Order of Loyalty to the Crown of Malaysia (PSM) – Tan Sri (2013)
- Pahang
  - Knight Grand Companion of the Order of Sultan Ahmad Shah of Pahang (SSAP) – Dato' Sri (2006)
- Perlis
  - Knight Grand Commander of the Order of the Crown of Perlis (SPMP) – Dato' Seri (2005)
  - Knight Commander of the Order of the Crown of Perlis (DPMP) – Dato' (1985)
