= Mordi Bimol =

Malaysian politician

Yang Berhormat Tuan Mordi Bimol MP
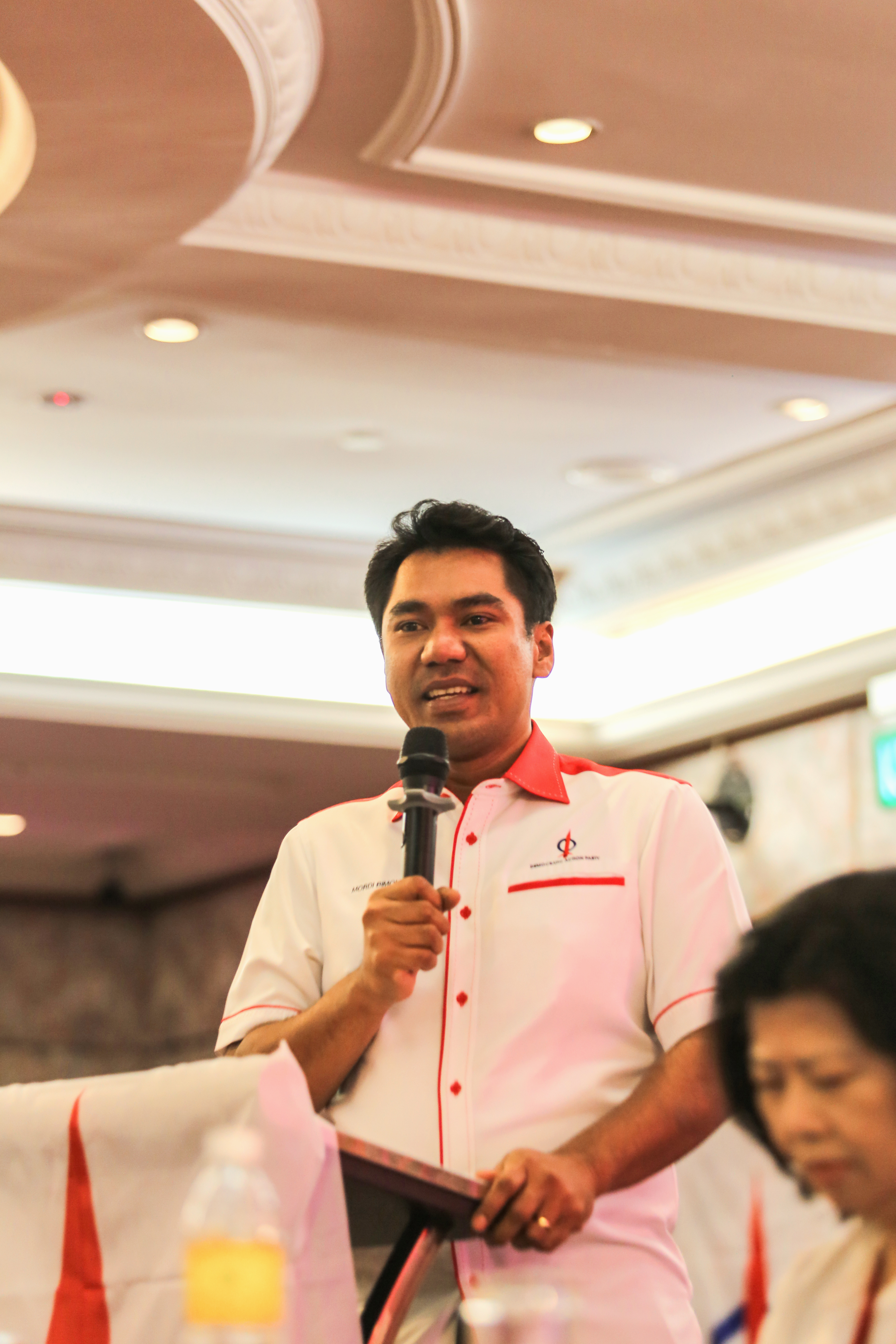
- Mordi giving a speech

Deputy Minister of Youth and Sports
- Incumbent
- Assumed office 17 December 2025
- Monarch: Ibrahim Iskandar
- Prime Minister: Anwar Ibrahim
- Minister: Mohammed Taufiq Johari
- Preceded by: Adam Adli
- Constituency: Mas Gading

State Vice Chairman of the Democratic Action Party of Sarawak
- Incumbent
- Assumed office 5 November 2018 Serving with Wong King Wei (2018–2020) & Oscar Ling Chai Yew (since 2021)
- Secretary-General: Lim Guan Eng (2018–2022); Anthony Loke Siew Fook (since 2022)
- State Chairman: Chong Chieng Jen
- Preceded by: Leon Jimat Donald; David Wong Kee Woan

Member of the Malaysian Parliament for Mas Gading
- Incumbent
- Assumed office 9 May 2018
- Preceded by: Anthony Nogeh Gumbek (BN–PDP)
- Majority: 3,024 (2018); 5,840 (2022)

Personal details
- Born: Mordi anak Bimol; 20 January 1985 (age 41) Bau, Kuching Division, Sarawak, Malaysia
- Citizenship: Malaysian
- Party: Democratic Action Party (DAP) (since 2011)
- Other political affiliations: Pakatan Rakyat (PR) (2011–2015); Pakatan Harapan (PH) (since 2015)
- Spouse: Gracella Santianna Yong (m. 2019)
- Parent(s): Francis Bimol Chakravarty (father); Cathern Labis Basen (mother)
- Education: Universiti Malaysia Sarawak
- Occupation: Politician

Mordi anak Bimol (born 20 January 1985) is a Malaysian politician who has served as the Deputy Minister of Youth and Sports in the Unity Government administration under Prime Minister Anwar Ibrahim and Minister Mohammed Taufiq Johari since December 2025 and the Member of Parliament (MP) for Mas Gading since May 2018. He is a member of the Democratic Action Party (DAP), a component party of the Pakatan Harapan (PH) coalition. He has also served as the State Vice Chairman of DAP of Sarawak since November 2018 and Branch Chairman of DAP of Tasik Biru. In addition, he previously served as the special assistant to Stampin MP and Member of the Sarawak State Legislative Assembly for Padungan Chong Chieng Jen. He is a Bidayuh from Sarawak.

== Early life and education ==
Mordi completed his secondary education at Sekolah Menengah Kebangsaan Batu Kawa (Batu Kawa National Secondary School). He later completed his tertiary education at University of Malaysia, Sarawak (UNIMAS), graduating with a degree in aquatic science in 2008. Mordi worked as a reporter for The Borneo Post's sister publication Utusan Borneo for a brief period.

== Political career ==
Mordi began his political career when he joined the DAP in 2011. He has served as special assistant to DAP vice chairman and Sarawak state liaison committee chairman Chong Chieng Jen ever since.

In May 2013, Mordi contested in his first election after being selected as the DAP candidate to contest in a four-cornered fight for the Mas Gading federal seat during the 13th Malaysian general election. Whilst campaigning, Mordi was rushed to hospital in Bau after experiencing some difficulty in breathing and chest pain. He eventually finished third in the polls.

In November 2015, Mordi was elected into the 15-member DAP Sarawak state liaison committee.

In April 2016, Mordi was announced as DAP's candidate to contest for the Tasik Biru state seat in the 11th Sarawak state election by Chong during the launch of the party's new operations centre. However, Mordi was unsuccessful in his challenge against his opponent from the Progressive Democratic Party (PDP).

On 10 May 2018, Mordi was elected as an MP following the results of the historic 14th Malaysian general election. His victory was considered a surprise as in doing so, he managed to defeat the incumbent, Anthony Nogeh Gumbek, who was touted as a heavyweight as the then-caretaker Deputy Minister of Agriculture and Agro-based Industry of Malaysia. Later in November 2018, Mordi was elected as vice chairman of DAP's Sarawak state liaison committee alongside Padungan assemblyman (MLA) Wong King Wei.

== Election results ==
Parliament of Malaysia
Year	Constituency	Candidate	Votes	Pct	Opponent(s)	Votes	Pct	Ballots cast	Majority	Turnout
2013	P192 Mas Gading	Mordi Bimol (DAP)	5,293	26.30%	Anthony Nogeh Gumbek (PDP)	8,265	41.06%	20,384	2,156	79.10%
2013	P192 Mas Gading	Mordi Bimol (DAP)	5,293	26.30%	Tiki Lafe (IND)	6,109	30.35%	20,384	2,156	79.10%
2013	P192 Mas Gading	Mordi Bimol (DAP)	5,293	26.30%	Patrick Uren (STAR)	462	2.30%	20,384	2,156	79.10%
2018	P192 Mas Gading	Mordi Bimol (DAP)	12,771	56.71%	Anthony Nogeh Gumbek (PDP)	9,747	43.29%	22,822	3,024	77.06%
2022	P192 Mas Gading	Mordi Bimol (DAP)	17,274	55.05%	Lidang Disen (PDP)	11,794	37.59%	31,379	5,480	66.52%
2022	P192 Mas Gading	Mordi Bimol (DAP)	17,274	55.05%	Ryan Sim Min Leong (PBK)	2,311	7.36%	31,379	5,480	66.52%

Sarawak State Legislative Assembly
Year	Constituency	Candidate	Votes	Pct	Opponent(s)	Votes	Pct	Ballots cast	Majority	Turnout
2016	N02 Tasik Biru	Mordi Bimol (DAP)	5,634	44.87%	Henry @ Harry Jinep (PDP)	6,922	55.13%	12,797	1,288	75.10%

== Personal life ==
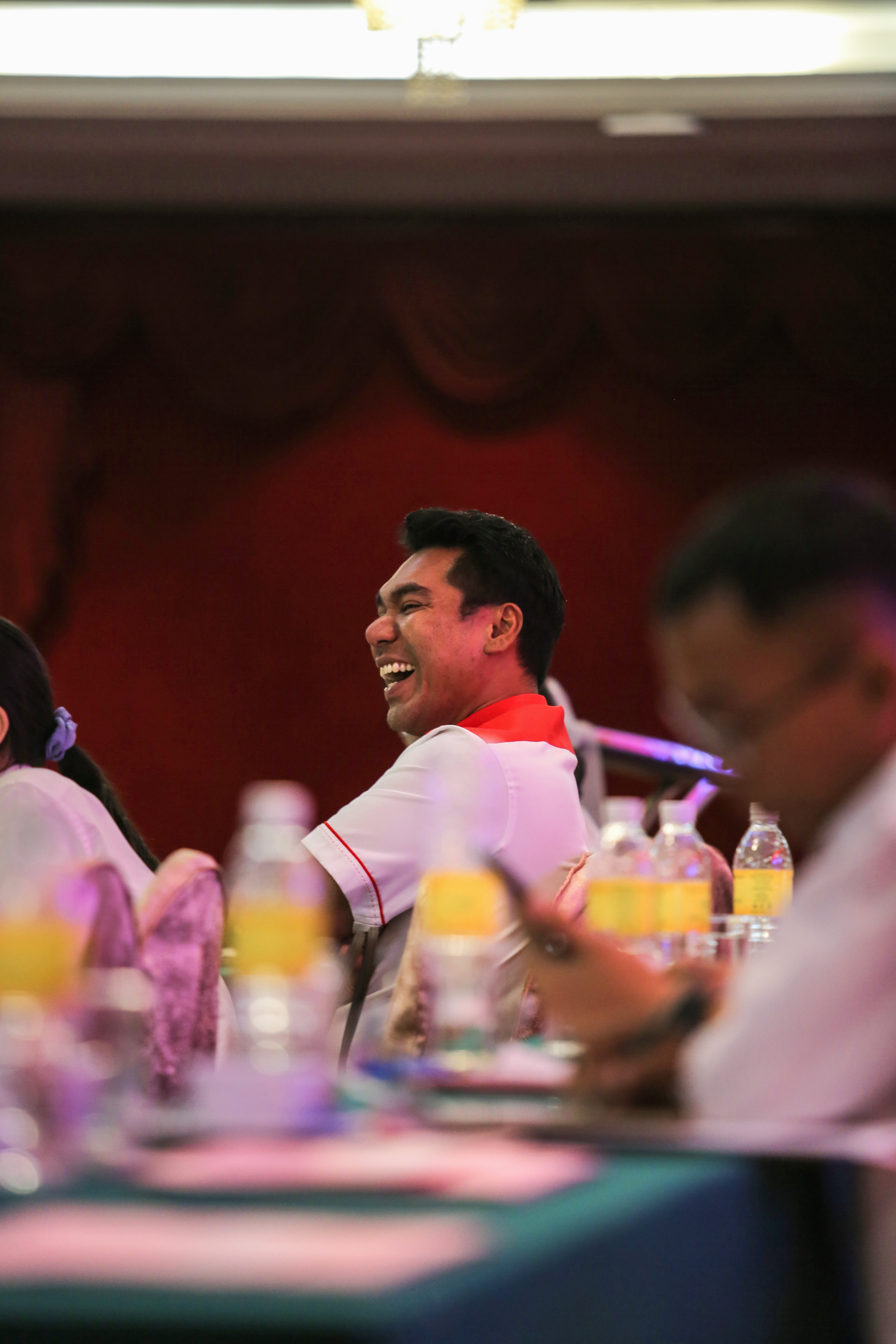
Mordi in 2023

On 10 August 2019, Mordi was married to Gracella Santianna Yong at his hometown Bau.

== Honours ==
=== Honours of Malaysia ===
- Malaysia
  - Recipient of the 17th Yang di-Pertuan Agong Installation Medal (2024)

== See also ==
- Mas Gading (federal constituency)
- Tasik Biru (state constituency)
