= Tiki Lafe =

Malaysian politician

Yang Berbahagia Dato' Tiki Lafe DPMP DMSM

Deputy Minister of Rural and Regional Development
- In office 27 March 2004 – 18 March 2008 Serving with Awang Adek Hussin (2004-2006); Zainal Abidin Osman (2006-2008)
- Monarchs: Sirajuddin; Mizan Zainal Abidin
- Prime Minister: Abdullah Ahmad Badawi
- Minister: Abdul Aziz Shamsuddin
- Preceded by: Palanivel Govindasamy
- Succeeded by: Joseph Kurup
- Constituency: Mas Gading

Deputy Minister of National Unity and Community Development
- In office 15 December 1999 – 26 March 2004
- Monarchs: Salahuddin; Sirajuddin
- Prime Minister: Mahathir Mohamad; Abdullah Ahmad Badawi
- Minister: Siti Zaharah Sulaiman
- Preceded by: Peter Tinggom Kamarau
- Succeeded by: Palanivel Govindasamy
- Constituency: Mas Gading

Member of the Malaysian Parliament for Mas Gading
- In office 29 November 1999 – 5 May 2013
- Preceded by: Patau Rubis
- Succeeded by: Nogeh Gumbek
- Majority: 4,020 (1999); 2,712 (2004); 4,301 (2008)

Personal details
- Born: Tekhee @ Tiki anak Lafe; 11 May 1954 (age 72) Crown Colony of Sarawak (now Sarawak, Malaysia)
- Party: Sarawak Progressive Democratic Party (SPDP); Independent; Malaysian United Indigenous Party (BERSATU) (2018–2020); Sarawak United Party (PSB) (2020–present)
- Other political affiliations: Barisan Nasional (BN) (until 2018); Pakatan Harapan (PH) (2018–2020); Perikatan Rakyat Bersatu Sarawak (PERKASA) (2022–present)
- Occupation: Politician

Tiki Lafe (born 11 May 1954) was the Member of Parliament of Malaysia for the Mas Gading constituency in Sarawak from 1999 to 2013, representing the Sarawak Progressive Democratic Party (SPDP) in the then-ruling Barisan Nasional coalition.

Tiki was a Deputy Minister of Rural and Regional Development in the Barisan Nasional government (appointed in 2004), but was left out of the ministry after the 2008 election. His loss of the ministry triggered unhappiness among the Bidayuh community in Sarawak that there were no longer any Bidayuh appointed to the ministry. He was dropped as a Barisan Nasional candidate for the 2013 election. He recontested the seat as an independent, but was defeated by the Barisan Nasional candidate Nogeh Gumbek. Presently he is a member of Malaysian United Indigenous Party or Parti Pribumi Bersatu Malaysia (BERSATU), a component of Pakatan Harapan (PH) coalition, in which he joined in 2018.

== Election results ==
Parliament of Malaysia
Year	Constituency	Candidate	Votes	Pct	Opponent(s)	Votes	Pct	Ballots cast	Majority	Turnout
1999	P166 Mas Gading	Tiki Lafe (SPDP)	10,684	61.59%	Patau Rubis (STAR)	6,664	38.41%	17,706	4,020	66.26%
2004	P192 Mas Gading	Tiki Lafe (SPDP)	10,579	57.35%	Patau Rubis (SNAP)	7,867	42.65%	18,755	2,712	65.12%
2008	P192 Mas Gading	Tiki Lafe (SPDP)	8,551	58.64%	Patau Rubis (SNAP)	4,250	29.14%	14,800	4,301	67.37%
2008	P192 Mas Gading	Tiki Lafe (SPDP)	8,551	58.64%	Favian Tisen (IND)	1,476	10.12%	14,800	4,301	67.37%
2008	P192 Mas Gading	Tiki Lafe (SPDP)	8,551	58.64%	Apin Baeng (IND)	306	2.10%	14,800	4,301	67.37%
2013	P192 Mas Gading	Tiki Lafe (IND)	6,109	30.35%	Anthony Nogeh Gumbek (SPDP)	8,265	41.06%	20,384	2,156	79.10%
2013	P192 Mas Gading	Tiki Lafe (IND)	6,109	30.35%	Mordi Bimol (DAP)	5,293	26.30%	20,384	2,156	79.10%
2013	P192 Mas Gading	Tiki Lafe (IND)	6,109	30.35%	Patrick Uren (STAR)	462	2.30%	20,384	2,156	79.10%

== Honours ==
- Malacca
  - Companion Class I of the Exalted Order of Malacca (DMSM) – Datuk (2003)
- Perlis
  - Knight Commander of the Order of the Crown of Perlis (DPMP) – Dato' (2008)
