= International reactions to the 2018 Malaysian general election =

International reactions

International reactions to the 2018 Malaysian general election are the reactions after Pakatan Harapan successfully obtained the majority seat in the Parliament. It was the first transition of power in the Government of Malaysia since the independent of Malaysia ending the 61-year reign of the ruling Barisan Nasional. Following a decisive victory for Pakatan Harapan in the 2018 election, Mahathir Mohamad was sworn in as Prime Minister on 10 May 2018.

== International responses ==
=== ASEAN member states ===
- Singapore
  - Prime Minister Lee Hsien Loong called Mahathir Mohamad to congratulate him on being appointed Prime Minister. In his Facebook, he posted "Called Dr. Mahathir bin Mohamad this morning to congratulate him on being appointed Prime Minister. He was busy meeting people for his Cabinet appointments! I wished him and his Government all the best, and I hope to catch up with him in person very soon either in KL or in Singapore."
  - Ministry of Foreign Affairs issued a statement, congratulating Mahathir and his coalition Pakatan Harapan on the outcome of the general election. The statement also state that "The people of Malaysia have given the new Government a clear mandate to lead the country. We have had close relations and extensive cooperation with successive Malaysian governments, including the government of Tun Mahathir when he was previously Prime Minister. We look forward to cooperating with Tun Mahathir and the new Government of Malaysia to further strengthen and deepen bilateral ties, for the benefit of both our peoples."
- Thailand
  - Prime Minister Prayut Chan-o-cha has extended his congratulations to Tun Dr Mahathir Mohamad on being re-elected as Malaysia's seventh Prime Minister following the outcome of the 14th General Election.
- Indonesia
  - President Joko Widodo congratulated newly elected Malaysian Prime Minister Mahathir Mohamad on his victory in an official phone call, and said that Indonesia-Malaysia relations would strengthen further under the new leader. "I am delighted to hear that the democratic process in Malaysia went smoothly and safely. I believe that under Mr. Mahathir's leadership, Indonesia–Malaysia relations will be improved further, and I pray that Mr. Mahathir will always be in good health to serve the mandate of the Malaysian people." Jokowi said to Mahathir
- Philippines
  - The office of the President of the Philippines congratulated the Philippines’ "old friend" Mahathir Mohamad on his return as Prime Minister of Malaysia on 11 May 2018. Presidential Spokesperson Harry Roque said the election of the 92-year-old Mahathir is expected to deepen the relations between the Philippines and Malaysia. “Prime Minister Mahathir is an old friend of the Philippines and his fresh mandate augurs well for the deep relations between the Philippines and Malaysia,” Roque said in a press statement.

=== Other countries ===
- USA
  - United States President Donald Trump has congratulated Prime Minister Mahathir Mohamad on being sworn in as the new prime minister of Malaysia. The White House, in a statement posted on the US Embassy Kuala Lumpur Facebook account, said the US president also congratulated all Malaysians on their participation in a competitive and peaceful election campaign.
- Australia
  - Australian Prime Minister Malcolm Turnbull and Foreign Minister Julie Bishop say in a joint statement that Australia and Malaysia have a rich, broad and deep contemporary relationship, full of potential, and underpinned by shared interests and values. They say their government looks forward to continuing to work with Malaysia to further strengthen the partnership and friendship between the two countries and peoples.

== See also ==
- Second premiership of Mahathir Mohamad
