= Zakri Hassan =

Malaysian politician

Yang Berhormat Tuan Zakri Hassan MP
- ذكري حسّان

Member of the Malaysian Parliament for Kangar
- Incumbent
- Assumed office 19 November 2022
- Preceded by: Noor Amin Ahmad (PH–PKR)
- Majority: 9,192 (2022)

Personal details
- Born: Zakri bin Hassan
- Citizenship: Malaysian
- Party: Malaysian United Indigenous Party (BERSATU)
- Other political affiliations: Perikatan Nasional (PN)
- Occupation: Politician

Zakri bin Hassan is a Malaysian politician who has served as the Member of Parliament (MP) for Kangar since November 2022. He is a member of the Malaysian United Indigenous Party (BERSATU), a component party of the Perikatan Nasional (PN) coalition.

== Early career ==
Prior his political career, he worked as school dormitory warden.

== Political positions ==
=== Education ===
Zakri Hassan has claimed that religious schools in Perlis outperform national schools in Perlis according to the data in Sijil Pelajaran Malaysia between the years of 2023 and 2024. He also said that more religious schools should be built instead of secular schools, stating: "These schools perform better than secular schools ran by the Ministry of Education." He had also said that the Ministry of Education must work harder to balance the Islamic curriculum, technology and humanity, stating: "Technology moves at lighting speed like AI, while religious questions of humanity are more statistical in nature. If we pursue technology too much, we will miss out on matters such as spirituality and religion."

Zakri Hassan had also said that bullying in Malaysia could be eradicated if teachers showed the bullies some care, and that constant scolding and harshly treating them is going to make the bullies even worser.

=== Women Rights ===
Zakri Hassan had said that the Dewan Undangan Negeri of Malaysia only had 13.5% of women in the Dewan Rakyat and 12.6% of women in the Dewan Negara, and that it shall "increase".

=== Agriculture ===
The "Skim Takaful Padi" is an Agrobank plan to give farmers which are having problems around RM 3000. However, Zakri Hassan said that it was proposed earlier in 2023 instead of 2024.

=== Welfare ===
Zakri Hassan had stated that the people in Jualan Rahmah are not locals, instead they are traders from outside the area. Because of that, he said the government must review the initiative so that it's only locals.

== Election results ==
Parliament of Malaysia
Year	Constituency	Candidate	Votes	Pct	Opponent(s)	Votes	Pct	Ballots cast	Majority	Turnout
2022	P002 Kangar	Zakri Hassan (BERSATU)	24,562	43.70%	Fathul Bari Mat Jahya (UMNO)	15,370	27.35%	56,968	9,192	76.10%
2022	P002 Kangar	Zakri Hassan (BERSATU)	24,562	43.70%	Noor Amin Ahmad (PKR)	15,143	26.94%	56,968	9,192	76.10%
2022	P002 Kangar	Zakri Hassan (BERSATU)	24,562	43.70%	Nur Sulaiman Zolkapli (PEJUANG)	708	1.26%	56,968	9,192	76.10%
2022	P002 Kangar	Zakri Hassan (BERSATU)	24,562	43.70%	Rohimi Shapiee (WARISAN)	417	0.74%	56,968	9,192	76.10%

== Honours ==
=== Honours of Malaysia ===
- Malaysia
  - Recipient of the 17th Yang di-Pertuan Agong Installation Medal (2024)

== See also ==
- Members of the Dewan Rakyat, 15th Malaysian Parliament
