= Fathul Bari Mat Jahya =

Malaysian Islamic scholar and politician

Fathul Bari Mat Jahaya
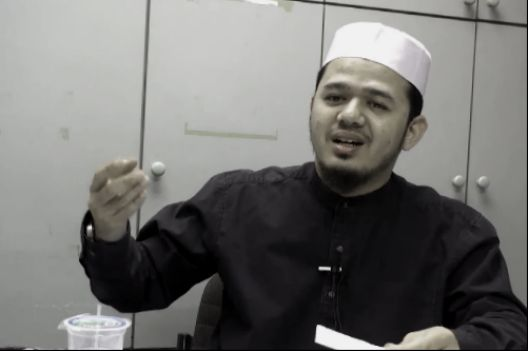

Personal life
- Born: 4 January 1980 (age 46) Alor Setar, Kedah, Malaysia
- Citizenship: Malaysian

Religious life
- Religion: Islam
- Denomination: Salafi

Fathul Bari Mat Jahya is a Muslim lecturer and politician from Malaysia.

== Academic qualifications ==
- Doctor of Philosophy (Ph.D.) in Hadith from the International Islamic University Malaysia (IIUM), completed in 2013. His Ph.D. thesis was reportedly recommended for publication by the university authorities.
- Master of Arts (MA) in Usuluddin (Hadith) from Yarmouk University, Jordan, obtained in 2006.
- Bachelor of Arts (BA Hons.) in Hadith & Islamic Studies from the Islamic University of Madinah, Saudi Arabia, acquired in 2004.

== Statements in the mainstream media ==
Bari criticized Penang's then Chief Minister Lim Guan Eng for inciting that the word 'Allah' can be used by non-Muslims. He also stated that Lim Guan Eng Should not take the issue as a political weapon as it will disrupt the whole majority Muslim in this country.

Bari criticized former law minister Zaid Ibrahim – who stated that the lack of religious discourse by the religious leaders that does not allow for different interpretations of Islam promotes extremism and makes Malaysia similar to the Islamic State of Iraq and Syria – stating that liberals such as Ibrahim seem to only want to follow civil laws but not those created by Allah and that it is the responsibility of the Ulema to specifically identify what is wajib (obligatory), halal (allowed), and haram (prohibited).

== Controversies ==
Bari was accused of being a Wahhabi and deviates from Islamic teaching by PAS leaders. However, the statements made by these leaders are considered by some as political attacks.

== Election results ==
Parliament of Malaysia
Year	Constituency	Candidate	Votes	Pct	Opponent(s)	Votes	Pct	Ballots cast	Majority	Turnout
2022	P002 Kangar	Fathul Bari Mat Jahya (UMNO)	15,370	27.35%	Zakri Hassan (BERSATU)	24,562	43.70%	56,968	9,192	76.10%
2022	P002 Kangar	Fathul Bari Mat Jahya (UMNO)	15,370	27.35%	Noor Amin Ahmad (PKR)	15,143	26.94%	56,968	9,192	76.10%
2022	P002 Kangar	Fathul Bari Mat Jahya (UMNO)	15,370	27.35%	Nur Sulaiman Zolkapli (PEJUANG)	708	1.26%	56,968	9,192	76.10%
2022	P002 Kangar	Fathul Bari Mat Jahya (UMNO)	15,370	27.35%	Rohimi Shapiee (WARISAN)	417	0.74%	56,968	9,192	76.10%

== Honours ==
- Pahang
  - Knight Companion of the Order of the Crown of Pahang (DIMP) – Dato' (2015)
