= Kangar (federal constituency) =

Federal constituency of Perlis, Malaysia

Kangar (P002)
Perlis constituency

Federal constituency
- Legislature: Dewan Rakyat
- MP: Zakri Hassan; PN
- Constituency created: 1974
- First contested: 1974
- Last contested: 2022

Demographics
- Population (2020): 100,755
- Electors (2022): 74,859
- Area (km²): 141
- Pop. density (per km²): 714.6

Kangar is a federal constituency in Perlis, Malaysia, that has been represented in the Dewan Rakyat since 1974.

The federal constituency was created in the 1974 redistribution and is mandated to return a single member to the Dewan Rakyat under the first past the post voting system.

== Demographics ==
Ethnic breakdown of Kangar's electorate as of 2022
1. Malay (82.3%)
2. Chinese (14.8%)
3. Indian (1.90%)
4. Other ethnicities (1.00%)
Age breakdown of Kangar's electorate as of 2022
1. 18-20 (6.25%)
2. 21-29 (21.5%)
3. 30-39 (23.1%)
4. 40-49 (15.8%)
5. 50-59 (13.4%)
6. 60-69 (11.6%)
7. 70-79 (6.04%)
8. 80-89 (1.88%)
9. above 90 (0.35%)
Gender breakdown of Kangar's electorate as of 2022
1. Male (49.5%)
2. Female (50.5%)

== History ==
=== Polling districts ===
According to the federal gazette issued on 31 October 2022, the Kangar constituency is divided into 31 polling districts.

State constituency	Polling Districts	Code	Location
Bintong (N06)	Nesam	002/06/01	SK Padang Kota
Bintong (N06)	Abi	002/06/02	SK Abi
Bintong (N06)	Kechor	002/06/03	SR Islam 1
Bintong (N06)	Hutan Melintang	002/06/04	SK Behor Empiang
Bintong (N06)	Telok Kachang	002/06/05	SK Stella Maris
Bintong (N06)	Wang Bintong	002/06/06	SK Bintong
Sena（N07）	Kampong Salang	002/07/01	SK Kampong Salang
Sena（N07）	Repoh	002/07/02	Kolej Vokesional Kangar
Sena（N07）	Alor Lanchang	002/07/03	SK Jejawi
Sena（N07）	Taman Indera	002/07/04	SK Seri Indera
Sena（N07）	Tok Peduka	002/07/05	SK Sena
Sena（N07）	Padang Bohor	002/07/06	SM Sains Tuanku Syed Putra
Sena（N07）	Padang Petani	002/07/07	Institut Latihan Perindustrian Kangar (ILP)
Indera Kayangan (N08)	Padang Katong	002/08/01	SK Putra
Indera Kayangan (N08)	Derma	002/08/02	SMK Syed Hassan
Indera Kayangan (N08)	Pekan Lama Kangar	002/08/03	SMK Derma
Indera Kayangan (N08)	Pengkalan Assam	002/08/04	SMK Putra
Indera Kayangan (N08)	Pekan Baru Kangar	002/08/05	SK Seri Perlis
Indera Kayangan (N08)	Seberang Bakau	002/08/06	SJK (C) Khoon Aik
Indera Kayangan (N08)	Behor Gandin	002/08/07	SK Jalan Raja Syed Alwi
Kuala Perlis (N09)	Seberang Alor	002/09/01	SK Seberang Ramai
Kuala Perlis (N09)	Hujong Tanjong	002/09/02	SJK (C) Khay Beng
Kuala Perlis (N09)	Kepala Batas	002/09/03	SK Kuala Perlis
Kuala Perlis (N09)	Seberang Tok Pi	002/09/04	SMK Kuala Perlis
Kuala Perlis (N09)	Padang Besar Selatan	002/09/05	SK Padang Besar Selatan
Kayang (N10)	Titi Tok Bandar	002/10/01	SK Panggau
Kayang (N10)	Bangsai Lebah	002/10/02	SK Kayang
Kayang (N10)	Temak	002/10/03	SK Dato Wan Ahmad
Kayang (N10)	Seriab	002/10/04	SMK Dato' Ali Ahmad
Kayang (N10)	Gunong Utan Aji	002/10/05	SMK Syed Alwi
Kayang (N10)	Hujung Batu	002/10/06	SK Ujong Batu

=== Representation history ===
Members of Parliament for Kangar
Parliament	No	Years	Member	Party	Vote Share
Constituency created from Perlis Utara and Perlis Selatan
4th	P001	1974–1978	Shaari Jusoh (شعري جوسوه)	BN (UMNO)	14,250; 63.63%
5th	P001	1978–1982	Shaari Jusoh (شعري جوسوه)	BN (UMNO)	17,612; 66.81%
6th	P001	1982–1986	Mohd Radzi Sheikh Ahmad (محمّد راضي شيخ أحمد)	BN (UMNO)	22,251; 71.51%
7th	P001	1986–1990	Mohd Radzi Sheikh Ahmad (محمّد راضي شيخ أحمد)	BN (UMNO)	22,463; 70.51%
8th	P001	1990–1995	Ishak Arshad (إسحاق أرشد)	BN (UMNO)	26,819; 68.99%
9th	P002	1995–1999	Md Isa Sabu (مد عيسى سابو)	BN (UMNO)	20,000; 55.56%
10th	P002	1999–2003	Abdul Hamid Pawanteh (عبدالحميد ڤاوانتيه)	BN (UMNO)	16,529; 56.98%
10th	P002	2003–2004	Vacant (Note: Vacant from 7 July 2003 until the 2004 Malaysian general election due to the incumbent was appointed as the 17th President of Dewan Negara. No by-election was held due to the next general election was less than a year away.)		
11th	P002	2004–2008	Mohd Radzi Sheikh Ahmad (محمّد راضي شيخ أحمد)	BN (UMNO)	22,498; 69.34%
12th	P002	2008–2013	Mohd Radzi Sheikh Ahmad (محمّد راضي شيخ أحمد)	BN (UMNO)	23,821; 70.12%
13th	P002	2013–2018	Shaharuddin Ismail (شاهرالدين إسماعيل)	BN (UMNO)	23,343; 54.73%
14th	P002	2018–2022	Noor Amin Ahmad (نور أمين أحمد)	PH (PKR)	20,909; 46.80%
15th	P002	2022–present	Zakri Hassan (ذكري حسّان)	PN (BERSATU)	24,562; 43.70%

=== State constituency ===
Parliamentary constituency	State constituency						
Parliamentary constituency	1955–1959*	1959–1974	1974–1986	1986–1995	1995–2004	2004–2018	2018–present
Kangar			Bandar Kangar				
Kangar				Beseri			
Kangar			Bintong				
Kangar			Chuping				
Kangar				Indera Kayangan			
Kangar					Kayang		
Kangar					Kuala Perlis		
Kangar			Oran				
Kangar				Padang Pauh			
Kangar			Paya				
Kangar				Sena			
Kangar			Titi Tinggi				

=== Historical boundaries ===
State Constituency	Area				
State Constituency	1974	1984	1994	2003	2018
Bandar Kangar	Kampung Alor Pulai; Kampung Guar Ujung Batu; Kampung Salang; Kangar; Seriab				
Beseri		Alor Kangar; Abi; Beseri; Bukit Manek; Kampung Paya			
Bintong	Bintong; Kampung Syed Omar; Kurong Batang; Sungai Batu Pahat; Tebing Tinggi				
Chuping	Abi; Balik Bukit; Beseri; Bukit Jernih; Chuping				
Indera Kayangan		Derma; Kampung Alor Pulai; Kampung Guar Ujung Batu; Kangar; Seriab	Derma; Kampung Guar Ujung Batu; Padang Katong; Taman Putra Utama; Taman Syed Alwi Putra		
Kayang			Gunung Medan; Kampung Alor Pulai; Kampung Titi Serong; Kayang; Seriab		
Kuala Perlis			Kampung Perak; Kepala Batas; Kuala Perlis; Seberang Tok Pi; Taman Semarak		
Oran	Abi; Balik Bukit; Beseri; Chuping; Kampung Perit	Bawah Bukit; Bukit Jernih; Chuping; FELDA Chuping; Kampung Paya Burma			
Padang Pauh		Alor Sena; Kampung Padang Pauh; Kampung Paya; Maya Ayer; Santan			
Paya	Kampung Batu Dua; Kampung Padang Pauh; Kampung Paya; Padang Behor; Santan				
Sena		Kampung Guar Ujung Batu; Santan; Sena; Taman Bunga Padma; Taman Embun	Jejawi; Santan; Sena; Taman Bunga Padma; Taman Ira		Santan; Sena; Taman Bunga Padma; Taman Embun; Taman Ira
Titi Tinggi	Bukit Chabang; FELDA Rimba Mas; Kaki Bukit; Padang Besar; Wang Kelian				

=== Current state assembly members ===
No.	State Constituency	Member	Coalition (Party)
N06	Bintong	Vacant	
N07	Sena	Marzita Mansor	PN (BERSATU)
N08	Indera Kayangan	Gan Ay Ling	PH (PKR)
N09	Kuala Perlis	Abu Bakar Hamzah	PN (BERSATU)
N10	Kayang	Asrul Aimran Abd Jalil	PN (PAS)

=== Local governments & postcodes ===
No.	Local Government	Postcode
P002	Kangar Municipal Council	01000, 01500, 01502, 01503, 01506, 01680 Kangar; 02000 Kuala Perlis

== Election results ==
Malaysian general election, 2022
Party	Candidate	Votes	%	∆%
PN	Zakri Hassan	24,562	43.70	▲43.70
BN	Fathul Bari Mat Jahya	15,370	27.35	▼6.91
PH	Noor Amin Ahmad	15,143	26.94	▲26.94
PEJUANG	Nur Sulaiman Zolkapli	708	1.26	▲1.26
Heritage	Rohimi Shapiee	417	0.74	▲1.26
Total valid votes		56,200	100.00	
Total rejected ballots		660		
Unreturned ballots		108		
Turnout		56,968	76.10	▼5.60
Registered electors		74,859		
Majority		9,192	16.35	▲3.81
PN gain from PKR		Swing		?
Source(s) https://lom.agc.gov.my/ilims/upload/portal/akta/outputp/1753257/PUB605.pdf

Malaysian general election, 2018
Party	Candidate	Votes	%	∆%
PKR	Noor Amin Ahmad	20,909	46.80	▲46.80
BN	Ramli Shariff	15,306	34.26	▼20.47
PAS	Zahid Ibrahim	8,465	18.95	▼26.32
Total valid votes		44,680		
Total rejected ballots		806		
Unreturned ballots		217		
Turnout		45,703	81.70	▼3.11
Registered electors		55,938		
Majority		5,603	12.54	▲3.08
PKR gain from BN		Swing		?
Source(s) "His Majesty's Government Gazette - Notice of Contested Election, Parliament for the State of Perlis [P.U. (B) 232/2018]" (PDF). Attorney General's Chambers of Malaysia. 3 May 2018. "Federal Government Gazette - Results of Contested Election and Statements of the Poll after the Official Addition of Votes, Parliamentary Constituencies for the State of Perlis [P.U. (B) 306/2018]" (PDF). Attorney General's Chambers of Malaysia. 28 May 2018.

Malaysian general election, 2013
Party	Candidate	Votes	%	∆%
BN	Shaharuddin Ismail	23,343	54.73	▼15.39
PAS	Baharuddin Ahmad	19,306	45.27	▲45.27
Total valid votes		42,649	100.00	
Total rejected ballots		660		
Unreturned ballots		122		
Turnout		43,431	84.81	▲4.64
Registered electors		51,207		
Majority		4,037	9.46	▼31.48
BN hold		Swing		
Source(s) "Federal Government Gazette - Notice of Contested Election, Parliament for the State of Perlis [P.U. (B) 169/2013]" (PDF). Attorney General's Chambers of Malaysia. 26 April 2013. Archived from the original (PDF) on 2019-12-29. "Federal Government Gazette - Results of Contested Election and Statements of the Poll after the Official Addition of Votes, Parliamentary Constituencies for the State of Perlis [P.U. (B) 210/2013]" (PDF). Attorney General's Chambers of Malaysia. 22 May 2013.

Malaysian general election, 2008
Party	Candidate	Votes	%	∆%
BN	Mohd Radzi Sheikh Ahmad	23,821	70.12	▲0.78
PKR	Tunku Abdul Rahman Tunku Ismail	10,150	29.88	▲29.88
Total valid votes		33,971	100.00	
Total rejected ballots		808		
Unreturned ballots		167		
Turnout		34,946	80.17	▼1.51
Registered electors		43,591		
Majority		13,671	40.94	▲2.26
BN hold		Swing		

Malaysian general election, 2004
Party	Candidate	Votes	%	∆%
BN	Mohd Radzi Sheikh Ahmad	22,498	69.34	▲12.36
PAS	Ishar Saad	9,950	30.66	▼12.36
Total valid votes		32,448	100.00	
Total rejected ballots		548		
Unreturned ballots		99		
Turnout		33,095	81.68	▲2.26
Registered electors		40,516		
Majority		12,548	38.68	▲24.72
BN hold		Swing		

Malaysian general election, 1999
Party	Candidate	Votes	%	∆%
BN	Abdul Hamid Pawanteh	16,529	56.98	▲1.42
PAS	Zainul Abidin Yahaya	12,480	43.02	▼1.42
Total valid votes		29,009	100.00	
Total rejected ballots		482		
Unreturned ballots		73		
Turnout		29,564	79.42	
Registered electors		37,224		
Majority		4,049	13.96	▲2.84
BN hold		Swing		

Malaysian general election, 1995
Party	Candidate	Votes	%	∆%
BN	Md Isa Sabu	20,000	55.56	▼13.43
PAS	Aziz Shariff	16,000	44.44	▲44.44
Total valid votes		36,000	100.00	
Total rejected ballots		23		
Unreturned ballots		177		
Turnout		36,200		
Registered electors		36,235		
Majority		4,000	11.12	▼26.86
BN hold		Swing		

Malaysian general election, 1990
Party	Candidate	Votes	%	∆%
BN	Ishak Arshad	26,819	68.99	▼1.52
S46	Rosnah Darus	12,056	31.01	▲31.01
Total valid votes		38,875	100.00	
Total rejected ballots		1,450		
Unreturned ballots		0		
Turnout		40,325	75.19	▲2.90
Registered electors		53,630		
Majority		14,763	37.98	▼3.04
BN hold		Swing		

Malaysian general election, 1986
Party	Candidate	Votes	%	∆%
BN	Mohd Radzi Sheikh Ahmad	22,463	70.51	▼1.00
PAS	Shuib Mohamad	9,397	29.49	▲1.00
Total valid votes		31,860	100.00	
Total rejected ballots		730		
Unreturned ballots		0		
Turnout		32,590	72.29	▼4.87
Registered electors		45,082		
Majority		13,066	41.02	▼2.00
BN hold		Swing		

Malaysian general election, 1982
Party	Candidate	Votes	%	∆%
BN	Mohd Radzi Sheikh Ahmad	22,251	71.51	▲4.70
PAS	Musa Mohamed	8,866	28.49	▼4.70
Total valid votes		31,117	100.00	
Total rejected ballots		1,279		
Unreturned ballots		0		
Turnout		32,396	77.16	
Registered electors		41,983		
Majority		13,385	43.02	▲9.40
BN hold		Swing		

Malaysian general election, 1978
Party	Candidate	Votes	%	∆%
BN	Shaari Jusoh	17,612	66.81	▲3.18
PAS	Ahmad Long	8,750	33.19	▲33.19
Total valid votes		26,362	100.00	
Total rejected ballots		885		
Unreturned ballots		0		
Turnout		27,247	76.48	▼4.17
Registered electors		35,625		
Majority		8,862	33.62	▼6.13
BN hold		Swing		

Malaysian general election, 1974
Party	Candidate	Votes	%
BN	Shaari Jusoh	14,250	63.63
Independent	Raja Mokhtaruddin Raja Mohamed Din	5,349	23.88
Parti Rakyat Malaysia	Saad Man	2,796	12.48
Total valid votes		22,395	100.00
Total rejected ballots		931	
Unreturned ballots		0	
Turnout		23,326	80.65
Registered electors		28,924	
Majority		8,901	39.75
This was a new constituency created.
