= Mas Gading =

Federal constituency of Sarawak, Malaysia

Mas Gading (P192)
Sarawak constituency

Federal constituency
- Legislature: Dewan Rakyat
- MP: Mordi Bimol; PH
- Constituency created: 1977
- First contested: 1978
- Last contested: 2022

Demographics
- Population (2020): 51,434
- Electors (2022): 47,171
- Area (km²): 1,481
- Pop. density (per km²): 34.7

Mas Gading is a federal constituency in Kuching Division (Lundu District and Bau District), Sarawak, Malaysia, that has been represented in the Dewan Rakyat since 1978.

The federal constituency was created in the 1977 redistribution and is mandated to return a single member to the Dewan Rakyat under the first past the post voting system.

== Demographics ==
Source:Sarawak seats

Ethnic breakdown of Mas Gading's electorate as of 2022
1. Sarawak bumiputera (73.7%)
2. Chinese (17.6%)
3. Malay-Muslim bumiputera (7.20%)
4. Other ethnicities (1.50%)

As of 2020, Mas Gading has a population of 51,434 people.

Age breakdown of Mas Gading's electorate as of 2022
1. 18-20 (6.47%)
2. 21-29 (21.4%)
3. 30-39 (19.5%)
4. 40-49 (17.0%)
5. 50-59 (16.7%)
6. 60-69 (11.3%)
7. 70-79 (5.39%)
8. 80-89 (1.70%)
9. above 90 (0.41%)
Gender breakdown of Mas Gading's electorate as of 2022
1. Male (51.3%)
2. Female (48.7%)

== History ==
=== Polling districts ===
According to the gazette issued on 31 October 2022, the Mas Gading constituency has a total of 48 polling districts.

State constituency	Polling Districts	Code	Location
Opar（N01）	Sebiris	192/01/01	SK Sebiris
Opar（N01）	Jangkar	192/01/02	SK Jangkar
Opar（N01）	Sebandi	192/01/03	SK Sebandi
Opar（N01）	Temaga	192/02/04	SK Temaga/Paon
Opar（N01）	Stungkor	192/01/05	SK Kpg. Stungkor
Opar（N01）	Opar	192/01/06	SK Opar
Opar（N01）	Serayan	192/01/07	SK Serayan/Keranji
Opar（N01）	Rukam	192/01/08	SK Holy Name Kpg. Rukam
Opar（N01）	Senbawang	192/01/09	Balai Raya Perundang
Opar（N01）	Kandaie	192/01/10	Balai Raya Kpg. Kandaie
Opar（N01）	Pasir Tengah	192/01/11	SK Pasir Tengah
Opar（N01）	Sedaing	192/01/12	Balai Raya Kpg. Opek
Opar（N01）	Biawak	192/01/13	SK Biawak
Opar（N01）	Senibong	192/01/14	SK Senibong
Opar（N01）	Sebako	192/01/15	SK Sebako
Opar（N01）	Raso	192/01/16	Balai Raya Raso I
Opar（N01）	Raso II	192/01/17	Balai Raya Raso II
Opar（N01）	Bokah	192/01/18	SK Bokah
Opar（N01）	Stom Muda	192/01/19	Balai Raya Kpg. Stom Muda
Opar（N01）	Selampit	192/01/20	SK Kpg. Selampit
Opar（N01）	Jugan	192/01/21	SK Tembawang
Opar（N01）	Setenggeng	192/01/22	SK St. Teresa
Tasik Biru (N02)	Sajong	192/02/01	SK Bobak / Sejinjang
Tasik Biru (N02)	Apar	192/02/02	SK Apar
Tasik Biru (N02)	Buso	192/02/03	SJK (C) Chung Hua Buso
Tasik Biru (N02)	Tondong	192/02/04	SJK (C) Chung Hua Tondong
Tasik Biru (N02)	Grogo	192/02/05	Balai Raya Kpg. Grogo
Tasik Biru (N02)	Bau	192/02/06	SJK (C) Chung Hua Bau
Tasik Biru (N02)	Skiat	192/02/07	Balai Raya Kpg. Skiat Baru; SK Bau Taman Mutiara
Tasik Biru (N02)	Jagoi	192/02/08	Balai Raya Kpg. Duyoh
Tasik Biru (N02)	Daun	192/02/09	Balai Raya Kpg. Daun
Tasik Biru (N02)	Tanjong Poting	192/02/10	Balai Raya Kpg. Tanjong Poting
Tasik Biru (N02)	Atas	192/02/11	SK Atas
Tasik Biru (N02)	Barieng	192/02/12	Balai Raya Kpg. Barieng
Tasik Biru (N02)	Sudoh	192/02/13	Dewan Rekreasi Singgai Kpg. Sudoh
Tasik Biru (N02)	Segong	192/02/14	Balai Raya Kpg. Segong
Tasik Biru (N02)	Musi	192/02/15	SJK (C) Chung Hua Musi
Tasik Biru (N02)	Suba Buan	192/02/16	SK Suba Buan
Tasik Biru (N02)	Subar Bau	192/02/17	Dewan Serbaguna Kpg. Suba Bau
Tasik Biru (N02)	Sibuloh	192/02/18	Balai Raya Kpg. Sibuloh
Tasik Biru (N02)	Sebuku	192/02/19	SJK (C) Chung Hua Sebuku
Tasik Biru (N02)	Tai Ton	192/02/20	SJK (C) Chung Hua Tai Ton
Tasik Biru (N02)	Stass	192/02/21	SK Stass
Tasik Biru (N02)	Skibang	192/02/22	Balai Raya Kpg. Skibang
Tasik Biru (N02)	Sibobog	192/02/23	SK Sebobok
Tasik Biru (N02)	Serasot	192/02/24	SK Serasot
Tasik Biru (N02)	Serikin	192/02/25	SK Serabak
Tasik Biru (N02)	Bogag	192/02/26	Balai Raya Kpg. Bogag

=== Representation history ===
Members of Parliament for Mas Gading
Parliament	No	Years	Member	Party	Vote Share
Constituency created from Santubong and Bau-Lundu
5th	P131	1978-1982	Patrick Uren	BN (SNAP)	7,883; 60.22%
6th	P131	1982-1986	Patrick Uren	Independent	8,283; 48.65%
7th	P154	1986-1990	Patau Rubis	BN (SNAP)	10,178; 56.71%
8th	P154	1990-1995	Patau Rubis	BN (SNAP)	10,924; 53.94%
9th	P166	1995-1999	Patau Rubis	BN (SNAP)	14,871; 70.67%
10th	P166	1999-2004	Tiki Lafe	BN (PDP)	10,684; 61.59%
11th	P192	2004-2008	Tiki Lafe	BN (PDP)	10,579; 57.35%
12th	P192	2008-2013	Tiki Lafe	BN (PDP)	8,551; 58.64%
13th	P192	2013-2018	Anthony Nogeh Gumbek	BN (PDP)	8,265; 41.06%
14th	P192	2018–2022	Mordi Bimol	PH (DAP)	12,771; 56.71%
15th	P192	2022–present	Mordi Bimol	PH (DAP)	17,274; 55.05%

=== State constituency ===
Parliamentary constituency	State constituency					
Parliamentary constituency	1969–1978	1978–1990	1990–1999	1999–2008	2008–2016	2016−present
Mas Gading		Lundu				
Mas Gading					Opar	
Mas Gading			Tanjong Datu			
Mas Gading		Tasik Biru				

=== Historical boundaries ===
State Constituency	Area				
State Constituency	1977	1987	1996	2005	2015
Lundu	Kampung Rambungan; Lundu; Semantan; Stungkor; Tanjong Datu				
Opar				Kampung Jantan; Kampung Jugan; Kampung Sebako; Stenggeng; Stungkor	
Tanjong Datu		Kampung Biawak; Lundu; Semantan; Stungkor; Teluk Melano	Kampung Biawak; Lundu; Semantan; Tanjong Datu; Teluk Melano		
Tasik Biru	Bau; Kampung Peninjau; Serikin; Siniawan; Taitong		Bau; Kampung Raso; Opar; Stungkor; Tation	Bau; Krokong; Serikin; Taiton; Tundong	

=== Current state assembly members ===
No.	State Constituency	Member	Coalition (Party)
N01	Opar	Billy Sujang	GPS (SUPP)
N02	Tasik Biru	Henry Harry Jinep	GPS (PDP)

=== Local governments & postcodes ===
No.	State Constituency	Local Government	Postcode
N01	Opar	Lundu District Council; Bau District Council (Kampung Sepadah and Kampung Setenggeng areas)	94000 Bau; 94500 Lundu
N02	Tasik Biru	Bau District Council	94000 Bau; 94500 Lundu

== Election results ==
Malaysian general election, 2022: Mas Gading
Party	Candidate	Votes	%	∆%
DAP	Mordi Bimol	17,274	55.05	▼1.66
GPS	Lidang Disen	11,794	37.59	▲37.59
PBK	Ryan Sim Min Leong	2,311	7.36	▲7.36
Total valid votes		31,379	100.00	
Total rejected ballots		419		
Unreturned ballots		94		
Turnout		31,892	66.52	▼10.54
Registered electors		47,171		
Majority		5,480	17.46	▲4.03
DAP hold		Swing		
Source(s) https://lom.agc.gov.my/ilims/upload/portal/akta/outputp/1753265/PARLIMEN%20SARAWAK%20(PUB%20620).pdf

Malaysian general election, 2018: Mas Gading
Party	Candidate	Votes	%	∆%
DAP	Mordi Bimol	12,771	56.71	▲30.41
BN	Anthony Nogeh Gumbek	9,747	43.29	▲2.23
Total valid votes		22,518	100.00	
Total rejected ballots		236		
Unreturned ballots		68		
Turnout		22,822	77.06	▼2.04
Registered electors		29,617		
Majority		3,024	13.43	▲2.72
DAP gain from BN		Swing		?
Source(s) "His Majesty's Government Gazette - Notice of Contested Election, Parliament for the State of Sarawak [P.U. (B) 247/2018]" (PDF). Attorney General's Chambers of Malaysia. 3 May 2018. "Federal Government Gazette - Results of Contested Election and Statements of the Poll after the Official Addition of Votes, Parliamentary Constituencies for the State of Sarawak [P.U. (B) 321/2018]" (PDF). Attorney General's Chambers of Malaysia. 28 May 2018. Archived from the original (PDF) on 29 December 2019.

Malaysian general election, 2013: Mas Gading
Party	Candidate	Votes	%	∆%
BN	Anthony Nogeh Gumbek	8,265	41.06	▼7.58
Independent	Tiki Lafe	6,109	30.35	▲30.35
DAP	Mordi Bimol	5,293	26.30	▲26.30
STAR	Patrick Uren	462	2.30	▲2.30
Total valid votes		20,129	100.00	
Total rejected ballots		224		
Unreturned ballots		31		
Turnout		20,384	79.10	▲11.73
Registered electors		25,771		
Majority		2,156	10.71	▼18.79
BN hold		Swing		
Source(s) "Federal Government Gazette - Notice of Contested Election, Parliament for the State of Sarawak [P.U. (B) 184/2013]" (PDF). Attorney General's Chambers of Malaysia. 26 April 2013. Archived from the original (PDF) on 30 September 2018. "Federal Government Gazette - Results of Contested Election and Statements of the Poll after the Official Addition of Votes, Parliamentary Constituencies for the State of Sarawak [P.U. (B) 225/2013]" (PDF). Attorney General's Chambers of Malaysia. 22 May 2013. Archived from the original (PDF) on 30 September 2018.

Malaysian general election, 2008: Mas Gading
Party	Candidate	Votes	%	∆%
BN	Tekhee @ Tiki Lafe	8,551	58.64	▲1.29
SNAP	Patau Rubis	4,250	29.14	▼13.51
Independent	Favian Tisen	1,476	10.12	▲10.12
Independent	Apin Baeng	306	2.10	▲2.10
Total valid votes		14,583	100.00	
Total rejected ballots		188		
Unreturned ballots		29		
Turnout		14,800	67.37	▲2.25
Registered electors		21,968		
Majority		4,301	29.50	▲14.80
BN hold		Swing		

Malaysian general election, 2004: Mas Gading
Party	Candidate	Votes	%	∆%
BN	Tekhee @ Tiki Lafe	10,579	57.35	▼4.24
SNAP	Patau Rubis	7,867	42.65	▲42.65
Total valid votes		18,446	100.00	
Total rejected ballots		218		
Unreturned ballots		91		
Turnout		18,755	65.12	▼1.14
Registered electors		28,831		
Majority		2,712	14.70	▼8.48
BN hold		Swing		

Malaysian general election, 1999: Mas Gading
Party	Candidate	Votes	%	∆%
BN	Tekhee @ Tiki Lafe	10,684	61.59	▼9.08
STAR	Patau Rubis	6,664	38.41	▲38.41
Total valid votes		17,348	100.00	
Total rejected ballots		244		
Unreturned ballots		114		
Turnout		17,706	66.26	▲0.67
Registered electors		26,722		
Majority		4,020	23.18	▼28.07
BN hold		Swing		

Malaysian general election, 1995: Mas Gading
Party	Candidate	Votes	%	∆%
BN	Patau Rubis	14,871	70.67	▲16.73
Independent	Patrick Uren	4,087	19.42	▲19.42
DAP	Jeron Loben	2,085	9.91	▲1.83
Total valid votes		21,043	100.00	
Total rejected ballots		447		
Unreturned ballots		312		
Turnout		21,802	65.59	▼2.87
Registered electors		33,239		
Majority		10,784	51.25	▲35.29
BN hold		Swing		

Malaysian general election, 1990: Mas Gading
Party	Candidate	Votes	%	∆%
BN	Patau Rubis	10,924	53.94	▼2.77
Independent	Wilfred Rata Nissom	7,692	37.98	▲37.98
DAP	See Chee How	1,637	8.08	▲8.08
Total valid votes		20,253	100.00	
Total rejected ballots		359		
Unreturned ballots		0		
Turnout		20,612	68.46	▲1.44
Registered electors		30,110		
Majority		3,232	15.96	▼21.14
BN hold		Swing		

Malaysian general election, 1986: Mas Gading
Party	Candidate	Votes	%	∆%
BN	Patau Rubis	10,178	56.71	▲9.90
Independent	Patrick Uren	3,519	19.61	▲19.61
Independent	Mohamad Shamsuddin Mokhtar	1,561	8.70	▲8.70
Independent	Arien Nojiek	1,532	8.54	▲8.54
Independent	Chong Kim Mook	1,157	6.45	▲6.45
Total valid votes		17,947	100.00	
Total rejected ballots		410		
Unreturned ballots		0		
Turnout		18,357	67.02	▼7.38
Registered electors		27,391		
Majority		6,659	37.10	▲35.26
BN gain from Independent		Swing		?

Malaysian general election, 1982: Mas Gading
Party	Candidate	Votes	%	∆%
Independent	Patrick Uren	8,283	48.65	▲48.65
BN	Patau Rubis	7,969	46.81	▼13.41
Independent	Affandi Dhobi	432	2.54	▲2.54
Independent	Abang Saufi Adnan	241	1.42	▲1.42
Independent	Aloysius Dom Nagok	100	0.59	▲0.59
Total valid votes		17,025	100.00	
Total rejected ballots		382		
Unreturned ballots		0		
Turnout		17,407	74.40	▲3.01
Registered electors		23,398		
Majority		314	1.84	▼18.60
Independent gain from BN		Swing		?

Malaysian general election, 1978: Mas Gading
Party	Candidate	Votes	%
BN	Patrick Uren	7,883	60.22
Independent	Aloysius Dom Natok	5,208	39.78
Total valid votes		13,091	100.00
Total rejected ballots		501	
Unreturned ballots		0	
Turnout		15,968	77.41
Registered electors		20,628	
Majority		2,675	20.44
This was a new constituency created.
