= Anthony Nogeh Gumbek =

Malaysian politician

Yang Berbahagia Dato' Anthony Nogeh Gumbek DIMP

Secretary General of Progressive Democratic Party
- Incumbent
- Assumed office 2018
- President: William Mawan Ikom; Tiong King Sing
- Preceded by: Sylvester Entri Muran

Deputy Minister of Agriculture and Agro-based Industry II
- In office 29 July 2015 – 9 May 2018 Serving with Tajuddin Abdul Rahman (Deputy Minister of Agriculture and Agro-based Industry I)
- Preceded by: Mohd Johari Baharum; Chua Tee Yong
- Succeeded by: Sim Tze Tzin (Deputy Minister of Agriculture and Agro-based Industry)

Member of the Malaysian Parliament for Mas Gading
- In office 5 May 2013 – 9 May 2018
- Preceded by: Tiki Lafe
- Succeeded by: Mordi Bimol

Personal details
- Born: Nogeh anak Gumbek @ Anthony Nogeh anak Gumbek Sarawak
- Party: Progressive Democratic Party (PDP)
- Other political affiliations: GPS
- Spouse: Caroline Mawas anak Jonathan Sabai
- Occupation: Politician

Anthony Nogeh anak Gumbek, also known as Nogeh Gumbek, is the first Secretary General of the Progressive Democratic Party after the party changed its name from Sarawak Progressive Democratic Party. He is also the former Deputy Minister of Agriculture and Agro-Based Industry II alongside Dato' Sri Tajuddin Abdul Rahman during the last Cabinet reshuffle in 2015.

== Political career ==
Anthony Nogeh Gumbek won the Mas Gading parliamentary seat in the 2013 general election. However, he was defeated in 2018 general election by Mordi Bimol.

== Election results ==
Parliament of Malaysia
| Year | Constituency | Candidate | Votes | Pct | Opponent(s) | Votes | Pct | Ballots cast | Majority | Turnout |
|---|---|---|---|---|---|---|---|---|---|---|
| 2013 | P192 Mas Gading | Anthony Nogeh Gumbek (SPDP) | 8,265 | 41.06% | Tiki Lafe (IND) | 6,109 | 30.35% | 20,384 | 2,156 | 79.10% |
| 2013 | P192 Mas Gading | Anthony Nogeh Gumbek (SPDP) | 8,265 | 41.06% | Mordi Bimol (DAP) | 5,293 | 26.30% | 20,384 | 2,156 | 79.10% |
| 2013 | P192 Mas Gading | Anthony Nogeh Gumbek (SPDP) | 8,265 | 41.06% | Patrick Uren (STAR) | 462 | 2.30% | 20,384 | 2,156 | 79.10% |
| 2018 | P192 Mas Gading | Anthony Nogeh Gumbek (SPDP) | 9,747 | 43.29% | Mordi Bimol (DAP) | 12,771 | 56.71% | 22,822 | 3,024 | 77.06% |

== Honours ==
- Pahang
  - Knight Companion of the Order of the Crown of Pahang (DIMP) – Dato' (2015)
