= Mekong Review =

English-language literary magazine

- Categories: Southeast Asian literature
- Founder: Minh Bui Jones
- Founded: 2015
- Country: Australia
- Based in: Sydney
- Language: English
- Website: mekongreview.com

Mekong Review is a quarterly English-language literary magazine on Southeast Asian literature, especially Cambodian literature, Burmese literature, Vietnamese literature, Laotian literature, and Thai literature. It was founded by Minh Bui Jones, a Vietnamese-born Australian-based journalist, in Phnom Penh, Cambodia, and is based in Sydney, Australia.
