= Shaharuddin Ismail =

Malaysian politician

Ir. Shaharuddin Ismail
- شاهرالدين إسماعيل

Member of the Malaysian Parliament for Kangar
- In office 5 May 2013 – 9 May 2018
- Preceded by: Mohd Radzi Sheikh Ahmad (BN–UMNO)
- Succeeded by: Noor Amin Ahmad (PH–PKR)
- Majority: 4,037 (2013)

Personal details
- Born: Shaharuddin bin Ismail; 1 January 1967 (age 59)
- Citizenship: Malaysian
- Party: United Malays National Organisation (UMNO) (1999-2018); National Trust Party (Malaysia) (AMANAH) (since 2018)
- Other political affiliations: Barisan Nasional (BN) (1999-2018); Pakatan Harapan (PH) (since 2018)
- Profession: Engineer
- Shaharuddin Ismail on Parliament of Malaysia

Shaharuddin bin Ismail (born 1 January 1967) is a Malaysian politician. He was the Member of the Parliament of Malaysia for the Kangar constituency in Perlis from May 2013 to May 2018. He was elected in the 2013 election, after picked to replace Mohd Radzi Sheikh Ahmad as UMNO's candidate for Kangar seat. Presently he is a member of Parti Amanah Negara (AMANAH), a component of Pakatan Harapan (PH) coalition, after his resignation from United Malays National Organisation (UMNO) of Barisan Nasional (BN) in 2018.

== Election results ==
Parliament of Malaysia
Year	Constituency	Candidate	Votes	Pct	Opponent(s)	Votes	Pct	Ballots cast	Majority	Turnout
2013	P002 Kangar	Shaharuddin Ismail (UMNO)	23,343	54.73%	Baharuddin Ahmad (PAS)	19,306	45.27%	43,431	4,037	84.80%

== See also ==
- Kangar (federal constituency)
