= 2018 Malaysian general election =

- 9 May 2018

All 222 seats in the Dewan Rakyat 112 seats needed for a majority
- Registered: 14,940,624 (▲12.61%)
- Turnout: 82.33% (▼2.51pp)
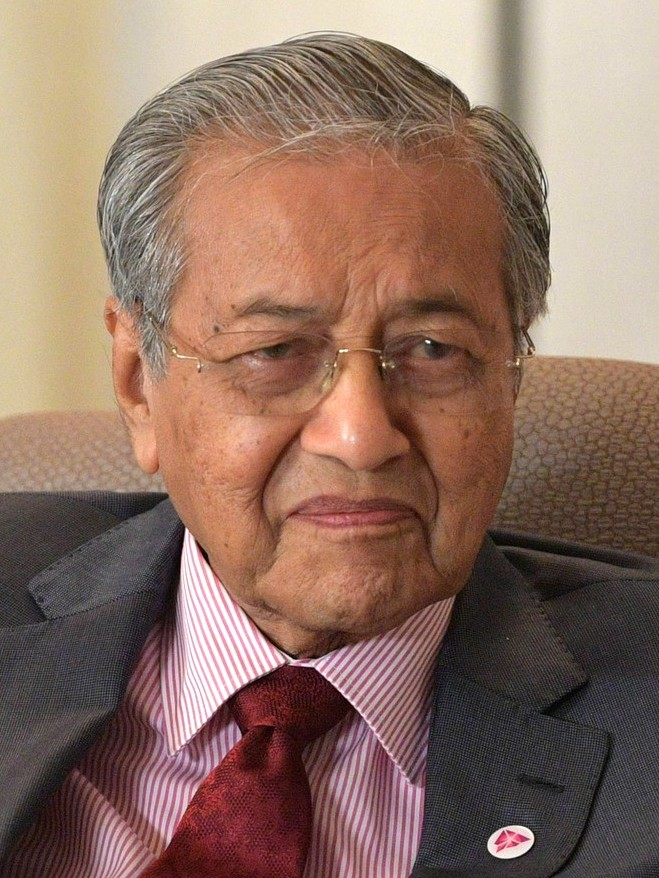

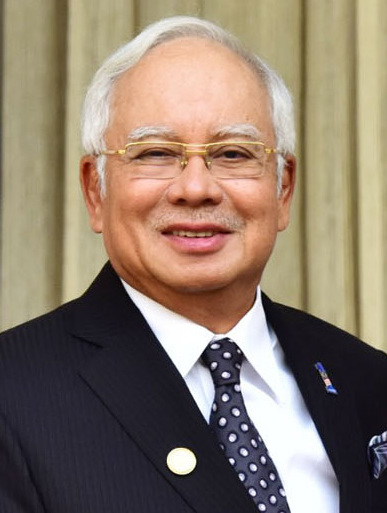

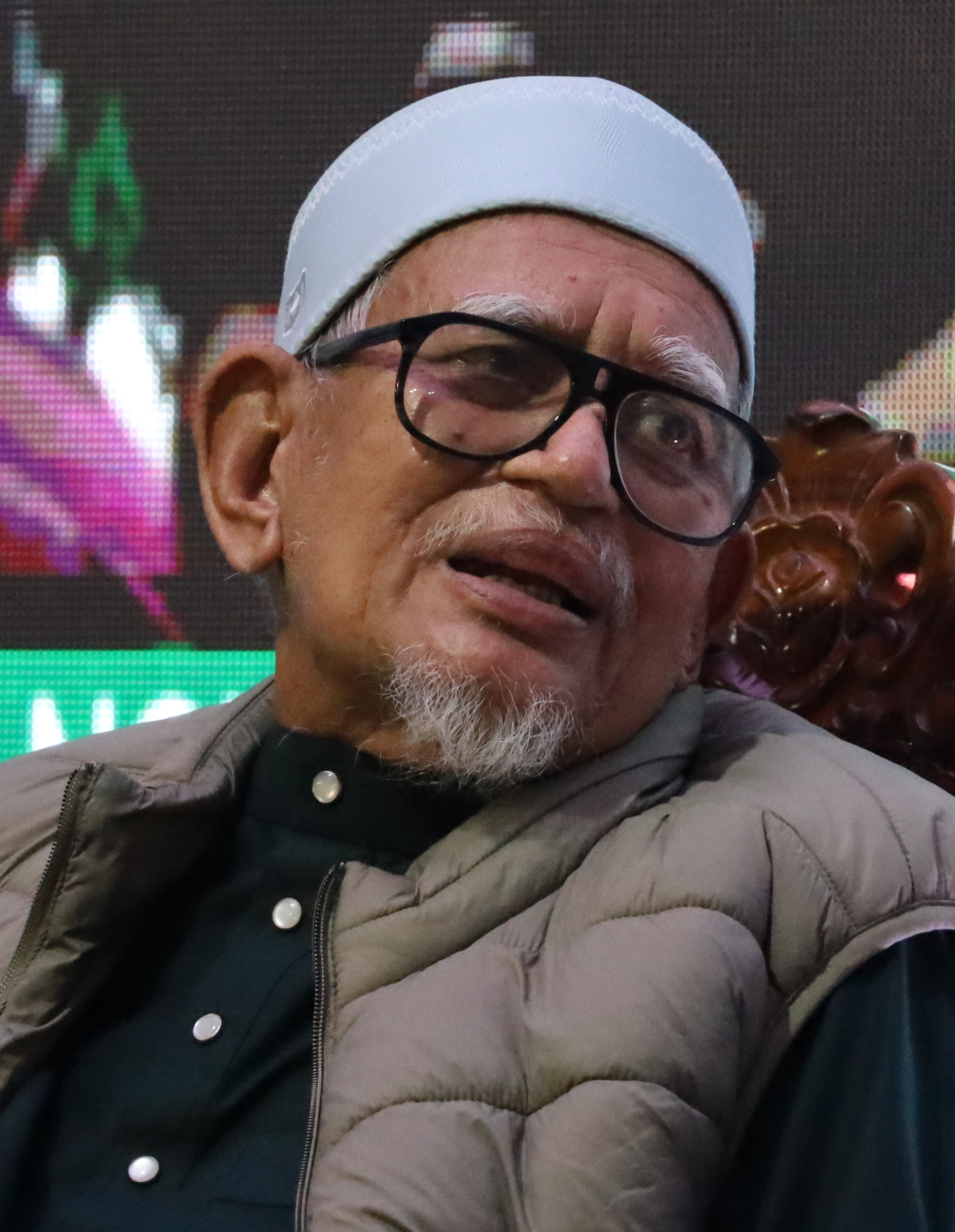

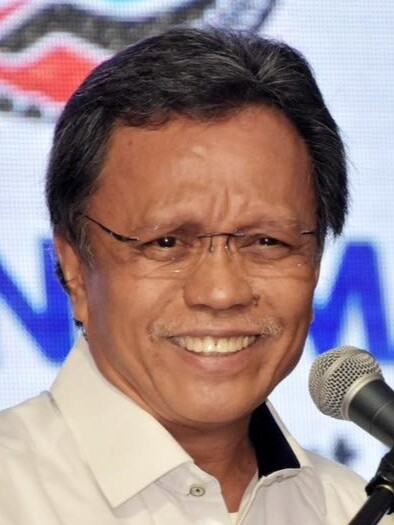

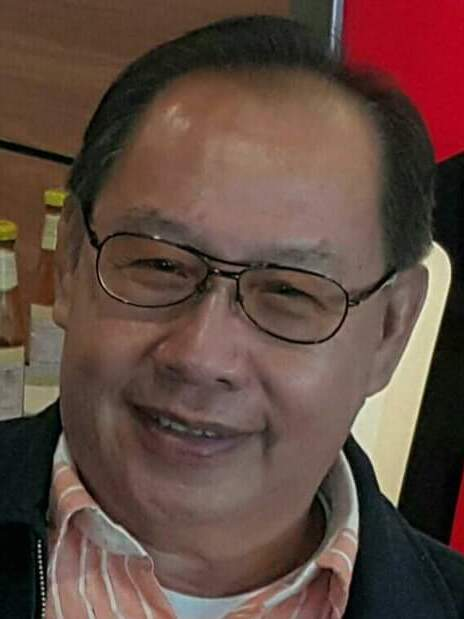
	First party	Second party	Third party
Leader	Mahathir Mohamad	Najib Razak	Abdul Hadi Awang
Party	BERSATU	UMNO	PAS
Alliance	Pakatan Harapan	Barisan Nasional	Gagasan Sejahtera
Leader's seat	Langkawi (Note: Not the incumbent, but stood in this seat and won.)	Pekan	Marang
Last election	35.91%, 67 seats (Note: People's Justice Party and Democratic Action Party)	47.38%, 133 seats	15.06%, 21 seats (Note: Pan-Malaysian Islamic Party and Pan-Malaysian Islamic Front)
Seats won	113	79	18
Seat change	▲46	▼54	▼3
Popular vote	5,518,906	4,081,063	2,041,200
Percentage	45.68%	33.78%	16.89%
Swing	▲9.77pp	▼13.60pp	▲1.83pp
	Fourth party	Fifth party
Leader	Shafie Apdal	Jeffrey Kitingan
Party	Warisan	STAR
Alliance	Pakatan Harapan	United Sabah Alliance
Leader's seat	Semporna	Keningau
Last election	–	0 seats, 0.09% (Note: Sabah Progressive Party)
Seats won	8	1
Seat change	New	New
Popular vote	280,520	67,175
Percentage	2.32%	0.56%
Swing	New	▲0.47pp
Prime Minister before election
Najib Razak
BN
Elected Prime Minister
Mahathir Mohamad
PH

General elections were held in Malaysia on Wednesday, 9 May 2018. At stake were all 222 seats in the Dewan Rakyat, the lower house of parliament. The 13th Parliament was dissolved by Prime Minister Najib Razak on 7 April 2018. It would have been automatically dissolved on 24 June 2018, five years after the first meeting of the first session of the 13th Parliament of Malaysia on 24 June 2013.

In an unprecedented victory, the Pakatan Harapan (PH) coalition, which had been the country's federal opposition prior to the elections, won a majority in the Dewan Rakyat together with the Sabah Heritage Party (WARISAN), with PH and WARISAN together winning 121 seats. The elections marked the first time in Malaysia's history that the ruling party was voted out of power. The Barisan Nasional (BN) coalition had previously enjoyed an uninterrupted reign over the country for over six decades since the 1955 Malayan general election, but this came to an end following the elections. PH's leader, Mahathir Mohamad, who previously served as Malaysia's prime minister from 1981 to 2003, was sworn in for the second time on 10 May, a day after the elections. At 93 years of age, Mahathir was also the world's oldest elected head of government. Barisan Nasional (BN), led by Najib, held onto 79 seats and became the new federal opposition, along with Gagasan Sejahtera (GS), which won 18 seats. The United Sabah Alliance (USA) won one seat, while three seats were won by independent politicians. The elections were widely regarded as one of the greatest political upsets worldwide in 2018.

In the simultaneous state elections held for twelve of the state legislative assemblies, PH retained Penang and Selangor with larger majorities, while gaining Negeri Sembilan, Malacca, Johor, Kedah and Perak from BN. WARISAN also seized Sabah from BN, which retained only two states – Perlis and Pahang. GS held onto Kelantan while gaining Terengganu from BN. State-level elections were not held in Sarawak, as the state had held its elections separately in 2016. However, as a consequence of the elections, Sarawak-based BN component parties left the coalition to form Gabungan Parti Sarawak (GPS), thereby taking over the state from BN.

Following the elections, Mahathir secured a royal pardon for the jailed PH leader, Anwar Ibrahim, and indicated that he would give way to the latter within the next few years. Meanwhile, Najib resigned as BN's chairman on 12 May and was succeeded as Leader of the Opposition by his party colleague, Ahmad Zahid Hamidi. Investigations within Malaysia into the 1Malaysia Development Berhad (1MDB) scandal, which had been halted during Najib's tenure, were resumed in the aftermath of the elections, resulting in several ongoing criminal indictments against the former prime minister. However, PH only ruled for 22 months before collapsing in the 2020 Malaysian political crisis, to be replaced by a new Government named Perikatan Nasional, led by Muhyiddin Yassin. Perikatan Nasional would itself collapse after 17 months, with Barisan Nasional taking power and Ismail Sabri Yaakob becoming prime minister. These are last election for Sabah, Johor, Malacca, Negeri Sembilan, Selangor, Kedah, Kelantan, Terengganu and Penang parallel with general election.

== Background ==
In the previous general elections in 2013, the incumbent Barisan Nasional government was re-elected for the thirteenth consecutive time, but with a decreased mandate and losing the majority vote. Barisan Nasional chairman, Najib Razak, was re-elected as Prime Minister to a second term. The main opposition, Pakatan Rakyat, led by Anwar Ibrahim, won the majority vote but was unable to win enough seats to form the government due to Malaysia's first-past-the-post voting system and alleged gerrymandering. The elections marked the first time Barisan Nasional lost the majority vote in the party's history.

== Electoral system ==
Elections in Malaysia are held at two levels: the federal level and the state level. Federal elections are held to elect members of the Dewan Rakyat, the lower house of Parliament, while state elections are held to elect members of the 13 State Legislative Assemblies of Malaysia. The heads of executive branch at both the federal and state levels, the Prime Minister and Menteri Besar/Chief Ministers respectively, are indirectly elected, usually filled by a member of the majority party/coalition in the respective legislatures.

The Dewan Rakyat is made up of 222 members of parliament, elected for a five-year term; these seats are distributed between the thirteen Malaysian states in proportion to the states' voting population. Members are elected from single-member constituencies that each elects one representative to the Dewan Rakyat using the first-past-the-post voting system. If one party obtains a majority of seats, then that party is entitled to form the Government, with its leader as prime minister. If the election results in no single party having a majority, there is a hung parliament. In this case, the options for forming the Government are either a minority government or a coalition. Malaysia does not practice compulsory voting and automatic voter registration. The voting age is above 21 although the age of majority in the country is 18.

The redistribution of electoral boundaries for the entire country had been presented to and passed by the Dewan Rakyat, and subsequently gazetted on 29 March 2018 after obtaining the royal consent of the Yang di-Pertuan Agong ahead of the 14th general election. Elections are conducted by the Election Commission of Malaysia (EC), which is under the jurisdiction of the Prime Minister's Department.

== Date and cost ==
The Constitution of Malaysia requires a general election to be held at the end of five (5) years from the date of the first Parliament of Malaysia proceeding after a general election unless it is dissolved earlier by the Yang di-Pertuan Agong due to a motion of no-confidence or at the request of the Prime Minister. Whenever Parliament (Dewan Rakyat) is dissolved, a general election shall be held within sixty (60) days from the date of the dissolution and Parliament shall be summoned to meet on a date not later than one hundred and twenty (120) days from that date (Article 55 of the Constitution of Malaysia).

=== Timetable ===
The key dates are listed below in Malaysia Standard Time (GMT+8):

28 March	Prime Minister Najib Razak tabled the Election Commission's redelineation report in the Dewan Rakyat
6 April	Najib Razak announced his intention to dissolve the Malaysian Parliament
7 April	Formal dissolution of Parliament
10 April	Election Commission chairman Hashim Abdullah announced that the general election would take place on 9 May 2018
28 April	Nomination process of candidates for the general election begins, and the deadline (10am) for the delivery of candidate nomination papers
28 April	Official 11-day campaigning period begins
5-8 May	Early voting begins
9 May	Polling day
10 May	Inauguration of the new prime minister Mahathir Mohamad at Istana Negara

=== Cost ===
The cost to the taxpayer of organising the election was RM500 million – RM100 million more than the previous general election.

Part of the spending was spent on indelible ink, which costed around RM4.8 million for a total of 100,000 bottles of 60mL ink imported from Mysore Paints and Varnish Limited in India.

=== Election spending ===
Before the campaign, there were no limits to what a political party, candidate, or third party (corporations, unions, special interest groups, etc.) can spend: Spending rules are only in force after the writs have been dropped and the campaign has begun. Malaysian election law set election spending limit at RM200,000 for each parliamentary candidate and half of the latter for each state legislature candidate.

== Dissolution of state legislative assemblies ==
While any state may dissolve its assembly independently of the Federal Parliament, the traditional practice is for most state assemblies to be dissolved at the same time as Parliament. In accordance with Malaysian law, the parliament as well as the legislative assemblies of each state (Dewan Undangan Negeri) would automatically dissolve on the fifth anniversary of the first sitting, and elections must be held within sixty days of the dissolution, unless dissolved prior to that date by their respective Heads of State on the advice of their Heads of Government.

Below are the dates of which the legislative assembly of each state dissolved:

State legislatives assemblies	First legislative day	Expected last legislative day	Expected election day (on or before)	Dissolution day
Kelantan	13 June 2013	13 June 2018	13 August 2018	7 April 2018
Terengganu	16 June 2013	16 June 2018	16 August 2018	9 April 2018
Negeri Sembilan	17 June 2013	17 June 2018	17 August 2018	7 April 2018
Johor	20 June 2013	20 June 2018	20 August 2018	7 April 2018
Selangor	21 June 2013	21 June 2018	21 August 2018	9 April 2018
Kedah	23 June 2013	23 June 2018	23 August 2018	7 April 2018
Perlis	28 June 2013	28 June 2018	28 August 2018	7 April 2018
Penang	28 June 2013	28 June 2018	28 August 2018	10 April 2018
Perak	28 June 2013	28 June 2018	28 August 2018	9 April 2018
Pahang	1 July 2013	1 July 2018	1 September 2018	7 April 2018
Malacca	1 July 2013	1 July 2018	1 September 2018	7 April 2018
Sabah	13 June 2013	13 June 2018	13 September 2018	7 April 2018

The Sarawak State Legislative Assembly was not dissolved as the last elections were held in 2016 and the term of the state assembly is due to end in 2021.

== Parties and leaders ==
Altogether 53 parties were eligible to contest in the elections and get on the ballot and can therefore elect a representative in the Dewan Rakyat. Furthermore, there are several independent candidates running in single-member constituencies.

The leader of the party commanding a majority of support in the Dewan Rakyat is the person who is called on by the Yang di-Pertuan Agong to form a government as prime minister, while the leader of the largest party not in government becomes the Leader of the Opposition.

The table below lists parties which were represented in the 13th Dewan Rakyat.

Name		Ideology	Leader(s)	Seats contested	2013 result		Seats in 13th Dewan Rakyat
Name		Ideology	Leader(s)	Seats contested	Votes (%)	Seats	Seats in 13th Dewan Rakyat
BN	Barisan Nasional; National Front	National conservatism	Najib Razak	222	47.38%	133 / 222	130 / 222
PH (Note: Pakatan Harapan contested under the PKR logo as their logo was not approved by the Registrar of Societies)	Pakatan Harapan; Alliance of Hope	Reformism / Progressivism	Mahathir Mohamad	204	36.1%	67 / 222	72 / 222
GS	Gagasan Sejahtera; Ideas of Prosperity	Islamic conservatism	Abdul Hadi Awang	158	14.78%	21 / 222	13 / 222
WARISAN	Parti Warisan Sabah; Sabah Heritage Party	Sabah Regionalism	Mohd. Shafie Apdal	17	New Party	0 / 222	2 / 222
PSM	Parti Sosialis Malaysia; Socialist Party of Malaysia	Democratic socialism	Mohd. Nasir Hashim	4	0.19%	1 / 222	1 / 222
Independents		–	–	24	–	0 / 222	2 / 222

== Last election pendulum ==
The previous General Election witnessed 133 governmental seats and 89 non-governmental seats filled the Dewan Rakyat. The government side had 44 safe seats and 34 fairly safe seats, while theopposition had 33 safe seats and 18 fairly safe seats.

Extended content

GOVERNMENT SEATS
Marginal
Mas Gading	Nogeh Gumbek	SPDP	40.6
Keningau	Joseph Pairin Kitingan	PBS	43.8
Pensiangan	Joseph Kurup	PBRS	44.3
Kota Marudu	Maximus Johnity Ongkili	PBS	45.9
Cameron; Highlands	Palanivel K. Govindasamy	MIC	46.2
Tenom	Raime Unggi	UMNO	46.7
Baram	Anyi Ngau	SPDP	48.9
Ranau	Ewon Ebin	UPKO	49.2
Bentong	Liow Tiong Lai	MCA	49.4
Beaufort	Azizah Mohd Dun	UMNO	49.4
Labis	Chua Tee Yong	MCA	49.5
Sungai Besar	Noriah Kasnon	UMNO	49.6
Kuala Selangor	Irmohizam Ibrahim	UMNO	49.6
Pasir Gudang	Normala Abdul Samad	UMNO	49.6
Bagan Serai	Noor Azmi Ghazali	UMNO	49.7
Hulu Selangor	Kamalanathan Panchanathan	MIC	49.9
Ketereh	Annuar Musa	UMNO	50.1
Machang	Ahmad Jazlan Yaakub	UMNO	50.1
Tebrau	Khoo Soo Seang	MCA	50.1
Kota Belud	Abdul Rahman Dahlan	UMNO	50.1
Jerai	Jamil Khir Baharom	UMNO	50.2
Segamat	Subramaniam Sathasivam	MIC	50.3
Kuala Kangsar	Wan Mohammad Khair-il Anuar; Wan Ahmad	UMNO	50.4
Arau	Shahidan Kassim	UMNO	50.6
Bera	Ismail Sabri Yaakob	UMNO	50.6
Titiwangsa	Johari Abdul Ghani	UMNO	50.6
Ledang	Hamim Samuri	UMNO	50.7
Tasek Gelugor	Shabudin Yahaya	UMNO	50.8
Setiawangsa	Ahmad Fauzi Zahari	UMNO	50.8
Tuaran	Madius Tangau	UPKO	50.8
Kulim- Bandar Baharu	Abd. Aziz Sheikh Fadzir	UMNO	51.0
Muar	Razali Ibrahim	UMNO	51.0
Pulai	Nur Jazlan Mohamed	UMNO	51.0
Balik Pulau	Hilmi Yahaya	UMNO	51.1
Pendang	Othman Abdul	UMNO	51.5
Merbok	Ismail Daut	UMNO	51.9
Bagan Datok	Ahmad Zahid Hamidi	UMNO	52.1
Sabak Bernam	Mohd Fasiah Mohd Fakeh	UMNO	52.1
Baling	Abdul Azeez Abdul Rahim	UMNO	52.5
Sik	Mansor Abd Rahman	UMNO	52.6
Sepanggar	Jumat Idris	UMNO	52.6
Saratok	William Ikom	SPDP	52.6
Jerlun	Othman Aziz	UMNO	52.8
Tanjong Malim	Ong Ka Chuan	MCA	53.0
Tanah Merah	Ikmal Hisham Abdul Aziz	UMNO	53.1
Sekijang	Anuar Abdul Manap	UMNO	53.2
Jerantut	Ahmad Nazlan Idris	UMNO	53.7
Kepala Batas	Reezal Merican Naina Merican	UMNO	53.8
Padang Rengas	Mohamed Nazri Abdul Aziz	UMNO	53.8
Tawau	Mary Yap Kain Ching	PBS	53.8
Kangar	Shaharuddin Ismail	UMNO	53.9
Sri Aman	Masir Kujat	PRS	54.4
Tanjong Karang	Noh Omar	UMNO	54.5
Padang Terap	Mahdzir Khalid	UMNO	54.6
Lubok Antu	William Nyallau Badak	PRS	54.7
Tanjong Piai	Wee Jeck Seng	MCA	55.0
Lipis	Abdul Rahman Mohamad	UMNO	55.1
Tambun	Ahmad Husni Hanadzlah	UMNO	55.3
Larut	Hamzah Zainudin	UMNO	55.6
Johor Bahru	Shahrir Abdul Samad	UMNO	55.8
Fairly safe
Batu Sapi	Linda Tsen Thau Lin	PBS	56.0
Besut	Idris Jusoh	UMNO	56.1
Setiu	Che Mohamad Zulkifly Jusoh	UMNO	56.1
Tapah	Saravanan Murugan	MIC	56.1
Sri Gading	Aziz Kaprawi	UMNO	56.4
Jeli	Mustapa Mohamed	UMNO	56.5
Hulu Terengganu	Jailani Johari	UMNO	56.5
Kemaman	Ahmad Shabery Cheek	UMNO	56.9
Parit	Mohd Zaim Abu Hassan	UMNO	56.9
Jempol	Mohd Isa Abdul Samad	UMNO	56.9
Simpang; Renggam	Liang Teck Meng	GERAKAN	57.0
Pasir Salak	Tajuddin Abdul Rahman	UMNO	57.4
Kuala Krau	Ismail Mohamed Said	UMNO	57.5
Bintulu	Tiong King Sing	SPDP	57.6
Lenggong	Shamsul Anuar Nasarah	UMNO	58.1
Selangau	Joseph Entulu Belaun	PRS	58.1
Silam	Nasrun Mansur	UMNO	58.2
Julau	Joseph Salang Gandum	PRS	58.3
Kubang Pasu	Mohd Johari Baharum	UMNO	58.4
Paya Besar	Abdul Manan Ismail	UMNO	58.4
Jelebu	Zainuddin Ismail	UMNO	58.4
Ayer Hitam	Wee Ka Siong	MCA	58.4
Kanowit	Aaron Ago Dagang	PRS	58.5
Putatan	Marcus Mojigoh	UPKO	58.7
Maran	Ismail Muttalib	UMNO	59.1
Alor Gajah	Koh Nai Kwong	MCA	59.2
Jasin	Ahmad Hamzah	UMNO	59.5
Kimanis	Anifah Aman	UMNO	59.5
Padang Besar	Zahidi Zainul Abidin	UMNO	59.6
Safe
Kudat	Abdul Rahim Bakri	UMNO	60.2
Tampin	Shaziman Abu Mansor	UMNO	60.4
Gerik	Hasbullah Osman	UMNO	60.6
Parit Sulong	Noraini Ahmad	UMNO	60.9
Gua Musang	Tengku Razaleigh Hamzah	UMNO	61.0
Kuala Pilah	Hasan Malek	UMNO	61.0
Libaran	Juslie Ajirol	UMNO	61.2
Tangga Batu	Abu Bakar Mohamad Diah	UMNO	61.4
Hulu Rajang	Ugak Kumbong	PRS	61.8
Rembau	Khairy Jamaluddin	UMNO	62.1
Mambong	James Dawos Mamit	PBB	62.8
Sembrong	Hishammuddin Hussein	UMNO	63.7
Sibuti	Ahmad Lai Bujang	UMNO	63.8
Papar	Rosnah Abdul Rashid Shirlin	UMNO	63.9
Kalabakan	Abdul Ghapur Salleh	UMNO	64.0
Pagoh	Muhyiddin Yassin	UMNO	64.8
Pontian	Ahmad Maslan	UMNO	65.0
Rompin	Jamaluddin Jarjis	UMNO	65.5
Labuan	Rozman Isli	UMNO	65.6
Kinabatangan	Bung Moktar Radin	UMNO	67.0
Langkawi	Nawawi Ahmad	UMNO	67.2
Sipitang	Sapawi Ahmad	UMNO	67.3
Putrajaya	Tengku Adnan Tengku Mansor	UMNO	69.0
Masjid Tanah	Mas Ermieyati Samsudin	UMNO	69.7
Beluran	Ronald Kiandee	UMNO	69.7
Mersing	Abdul Latiff Ahmad	UMNO	70.2
Lawas	Henry Sum Agong	PBB	70.6
Limbang	Hasbi Habibollah	PBB	72.8
Serian	Richard Riot Jaem	SUPP	73.5
Tenggara	Halimah Mohamed Sadique	UMNO	73.7
Pekan	Najib Razak	UMNO	75.2
Batang Lupar	Rohani Abdul Karim	PBB	75.4
Mukah	Leo Michael Toyad	PBB	75.5
Betong	Douglas Uggah Embas	PBB	75.9
Kota Samarahan	Rubiah Wang	PBB	76.8
Kapit	Alexander Nanta Linggi	PBB	77.1
Petra Jaya	Fadillah Yusof	PBB	77.8
Semporna	Mohd Shafie Apdal	UMNO	81.1
Pengerang	Azalina Othman Said	UMNO	81.9
Kota Tinggi	Noor Ehsanuddin; Mohd Harun Narrashid	UMNO	82.4
Santubong	Wan Junaidi Tuanku Jaafar	PBB	84.4
Batang Sadong	Nancy Shukri	PBB	85.5
Igan	Wahab Dolah	PBB	85.8
Tanjong Manis	Norah Abdul Rahman	PBB	87.4

NON-GOVERNMENT SEATS
Marginal
Alor Setar	Gooi Hsiao-Leung	PKR	47.4
Sepang	Mohamed Hanipa Maidin	PAS	49.1
Bachok	Ahmad Marzuk Shaary	PAS	49.5
Kuala Nerus	Mohd Khairuddin Aman Razali	PAS	49.9
Telok Kemang	Kamarul Bahrin Abbas	PKR	49.9
Temerloh	Nasrudin Hassan	PAS	50.1
Batu Pahat	Mohd Idris Jusi	PKR	50.1
Bukit Gantang	Idris Ahmad	PAS	50.2
Sarikei	Wong Ling Biu	DAP	50.4
Pasir Puteh	Nik Mazian Nik Mohamad	PAS	50.8
Lembah Pantai	Nurul Izzah Anwar	PKR	51.0
Sandakan	Wong Tien Fatt	DAP	51.0
Miri	Michael Teo Yu Keng	PKR	51.0
Kuala Krai	Mohd Hatta Ramli	PAS	51.2
Gombak	Mohamed Azmin Ali	PKR	51.4
Dungun	Wan Hassan Mohd Ramli	PAS	51.9
Sungai Siput	Michael Jeyakumar Devaraj	PKR	51.9
Raub	Ariff Sabri Abdul Aziz	DAP	52.1
Sibu	Oscar Ling Chai Yew	DAP	52.1
Pokok Sena	Mahfuz Omar	PAS	52.2
Kuala Langat	Abdullah Sani Abdul Hamid	PKR	52.2
Seremban	Loke Siew Fook	DAP	52.2
Kuala Kedah	Azman Ismail	PKR	52.3
Marang	Abdul Hadi Awang	PAS	52.6
Bukit Katil	Shamsul Iskandar Md. Akin	PKR	52.6
Padang Serai	Surendran Nagarajan	PKR	53.0
Bakri	Er Teck Hwa	DAP	53.4
Kluang	Liew Chin Tong	DAP	54.0
Kuantan	Fuziah Salleh	PKR	54.1
Wangsa Maju	Tan Kee Kwong	PKR	54.4
Sungai Petani	Johari Abdul	PKR	54.7
Kampar	Ko Chung Sen	DAP	54.7
Lumut	Mohamad Imran Abdul Hamid	PKR	54.8
Kapar	Manivannan Gowindasamy	PKR	55.1
Beruas	Ngeh Koo Ham	DAP	55.5
Shah Alam	Khalid Samad	PAS	55.7
Tumpat	Kamarudin Jaffar	PAS	55.8
Pasir Mas	Nik Mohamad Abduh Nik Abdul Aziz	PAS	55.8
Fairly safe
Kuala Terengganu	Raja Kamarul Bahrin Shah	PAS	56.0
Indera Mahkota	Fauzi Abdul Rahman	PKR	56.1
Telok Intan	Seah Leong Peng	DAP	56.3
Bandar Tun Razak	Abdul Khalid Ibrahim	PKR	56.4
Selayang	William Leong Jee Keen	PKR	56.7
Rantau Panjang	Siti Zailah Mohd Yusoff	PAS	56.9
Nibong Tebal	Mansor Othman	PKR	57.1
Hulu Langat	Che Rosli Che Mat	PAS	57.1
Gelang Patah	Lim Kit Siang	DAP	57.2
Batu	Chua Tian Chang	PKR	57.9
Kulai	Teo Nie Ching	DAP	57.9
Taiping	Nga Kor Ming	DAP	58.5
Gopeng	Lee Boon Chye	PKR	58.5
Permatang Pauh	Wan Azizah Wan Ismail	PKR	58.6
Ampang	Zuraida Kamarudin	PKR	58.8
Subang	Sivarasa K. Rasiah	PKR	58.8
Parit Buntar	Mujahid Yusof Rawa	PAS	58.9
Lanang	Alice Lau Kiong Yieng	DAP	59.3
Safe
Kota Bharu	Takiyuddin Hassan	PAS	61.5
Penampang	Ignatius Dorell Leiking	PKR	61.8
Kota Melaka	Sim Tong Him	DAP	62.3
Petaling Jaya; Selatan	Hee Loy Sian	PKR	63.0
Pengkalan Chepa	Izani Husin	PAS	63.2
Bayan Baru	Sim Tze Tzin	PKR	63.4
Stampin	Julian Tan Kok Ping	DAP	63.7
Klang	Charles Anthony R. Santiago	DAP	63.9
Kota Raja	Siti Mariah Mahmud	PAS	63.9
Segambut	Lim Lip Eng	DAP	64.6
Kubang Kerian	Ahmad Baihaki Atiqullah	PAS	64.7
Rasah	Teo Kok Seong	DAP	65.1
Kelana Jaya	Wong Chen	PKR	65.8
Pandan	Rafizi Ramli	PKR	65.9
Puchong	Gobind Singh Deo	DAP	66.7
Serdang	Ong Kian Ming	DAP	67.1
Jelutong	Jeff Ooi Chuan Aun	DAP	70.3
Ipoh Barat	Kulasegaran Murugeson	DAP	72.2
Kota Kinabalu	Wong Sze Phin	DAP	72.2
Bukit Bintang	Fong Kui Lun	DAP	72.8
Batu Kawan	Kasthuriraani Patto	DAP	73.1
Bandar Kuching	Chong Chieng Jen	DAP	73.8
Ipoh Timor	Su Keong Siong	DAP	75.5
Batu Gajah	Sivakumar Varatharaju Naidu	DAP	76.7
Bukit Bendera	Zairil Khir Johari	DAP	77.2
Bagan	Lim Guan Eng	DAP	77.8
Bukit Gelugor	Karpal Singh Ram Singh	DAP	80.1
Bukit Mertajam	Steven Sim Chee Kiong	DAP	80.5
Cheras	Tan Kok Wai	DAP	81.2
Petaling Jaya; Utara	Tony Pua Kiam Wee	DAP	81.3
Kepong	Tan Seng Giaw	DAP	81.8
Tanjong	Ng Wei Aik	DAP	82.8
Seputeh	Teresa Kok Suh Sim	DAP	85.7

== Opinion polls ==
Date	Pollster	Sample	BN	PH	GS	Others	Lead
May 2018	Merdeka Center	1,579	37.3%	43.4%	19.3%	-	6.1%
April 2018	Merdeka Center	1,206	40.3%	43.7%	16%	-	3.4%
January 2017	IM	104,340	27%	41%	21%	14% (Und.)	14%
26-30 Aug 2016	IDE	31,341	29%	59%	12%	-	30%

Note also that in the 2013 general election, the current component parties of Pakatan Harapan and Gagasan Sejahtera were competing together under an informal coalition, Pakatan Rakyat. In 2015, disagreements between those component parties over the Malaysian Islamic Party (PAS) and their desire to implement hudud law prompted a split, with PAS leaving to form the Gagasan Sejahtera coalition. The remaining parties in Pakatan Rakyat, together with PAS splinter party Amanah and former prime minister Mahathir Mohamad's Bersatu, formed the Pakatan Harapan coalition. Hence, while Pakatan Rakyat won the popular vote in 2013, the component parties forming Pakatan Harapan did not.

Notes

1. - Survey presented findings of Peninsular Malaysia respondents only.
2. - Survey presented findings of Selangor respondents only

== Politicians not standing ==
=== Members of Parliament not standing for re-election ===
MP	Seat	First elected	Party	Reason	Ref
Shaharuddin Ismail	Kangar	2013	Barisan Nasional	Dropped by party	
Gooi Hsiao-Leung	Alor Setar	2013	People's Justice Party	Transferred to Bukit Tengah state seat	
Ismail Daut	Merbok	2013	Barisan Nasional	Dropped by party	
N. Surendran	Padang Serai	2013	People's Justice Party	Dropped by party	
Izani Husin	Pengkalan Chepa	2013	Pan-Malaysian Islamic Party	Transferred to Kijang state seat	
Ahmad Baihaki Atiqullah	Kubang Kerian	2013	Pan-Malaysian Islamic Party	Dropped by party	
Nik Mazian Nik Mohamad	Pasir Putih	2013	Pan-Malaysian Islamic Party	Dropped by party	
Che Mohamad Zulkifly Jusoh	Setiu	2013	Barisan Nasional	Dropped by party	
Jailani Johari	Hulu Terengganu	2013	Barisan Nasional	Dropped by party	
Zairil Khir Johari	Bukit Bendera	2013	Democratic Action Party	Transferred to Tanjong Bunga state seat	
Ng Wei Aik	Tanjong	2013	Democratic Action Party	Dropped by party	
Jeff Ooi	Jelutong	2008	Democratic Action Party	Dropped by party	
Mohd Zaim Abu Hassan	Parit	2013	Barisan Nasional	Dropped by party	
Ko Chung Sen	Kampar	2013	Democratic Action Party	Transferred to Kepayang state seat	
Mohamad Imran Abdul Hamid	Lumut	2013	People's Justice Party	Transferred to Bukit Chandan state seat	
Ong Ka Chuan	Tanjong Malim	2008	Barisan Nasional	Not selected	
G. Palanivel	Cameron Highlands	2013	Independent	Not seeking re-election	
Ariff Sabri Abdul Aziz	Raub	2013	Democratic Action Party	Health concerns	
Tengku Azlan	Jerantut	1999	Barisan Nasional	Dropped by party	
Fauzi Abdul Rahman	Indera Mahkota	2013	People's Justice Party	Transferred to Sungai Lembing state seat	
Abdul Manan Ismail	Paya Besar	2008	Barisan Nasional	Death	
Rafizi Ramli	Pandan	2013	People's Justice Party	Court conviction	
Hee Loy Sian	Petaling Jaya Selatan	2008	People's Justice Party	Transferred to Kajang state seat	
G. Manivannan	Kapar	2013	People's Justice Party	Transferred to Hutan Melintang state seat	
Siti Mariah Mahmud	Kota Raja	2008	National Trust Party	Transferred to Seri Serdang state seat	
Tan Seng Giaw	Kepong	1982	Democratic Action Party	Dropped by party	
Tian Chua	Batu	2008	People's Justice Party	Failed in the nomination process	
Ahmad Fauzi Zahari	Setiawangsa	2013	Barisan Nasional	Dropped by party	
Abdul Khalid Ibrahim	Bandar Tun Razak	2008	Independent	Retired from politics	
Mohd Isa Abdul Samad	Jempol	2013	Barisan Nasional	Corruption investigations	
Teo Kok Seong	Rasah	2013	Democratic Action Party	Transferred to Bahau state seat	
Kamarul Baharin Abbas	Telok Kemang	2008	People's Justice Party	Dropped by party	
Koh Nai Kwong	Alor Gajah	2013	Barisan Nasional	Transferred to Machap Jaya state seat	
Abu Bakar Mohamad Diah	Tangga Batu	2013	Barisan Nasional	Transferred to Paya Rumput state seat	
Sim Tong Him	Kota Melaka	2008	Independent	Transferred to Kota Laksamana state seat	
Anuar Abdul Manap	Sekijang	2013	Barisan Nasional	Transferred to Kemelah state seat	
Er Teck Hwa	Bakri	2008	Democratic Action Party	Dropped by party	
Mohd Idris Jusi	Batu Pahat	2013	People's Justice Party	Dropped by party	
Noor Ehsanuddin Mohd Harun	Kota Tinggi	2013	Barisan Nasional	Dropped by party	
Khoo Soo Seang	Tebrau	2013	Barisan Nasional	Dropped by party	
Normala Abdul Samad	Pasir Gudang	2013	Barisan Nasional	Dropped by party	
Jumat Idris	Sepanggar	2013	Barisan Nasional	Party membership suspended	
Wong Sze Phin	Kota Kinabalu	2013	Democratic Action Party	Transferred to Sri Tanjung state seat	
Sapawi Ahmad	Sipitang	2008	Barisan Nasional	Transferred to Sindumin state seat	
Joseph Pairin Kitingan	Keningau	1986	Barisan Nasional	Not seeking re-election	
Raime Unggi	Tenom	2004	Barisan Nasional	Dropped by party	
Joseph Kurup	Pensiangan	2008	Barisan Nasional	Not seeking re-election	
Juslie Ajirol	Libaran	1999	Barisan Nasional	Transferred to Gum-Gum state seat	
Julian Tan Kok Ping	Stampin	2013	Democratic Action Party	Retired from politics	
James Dawos Mamit	Mambong	1999	Barisan Nasional	Health concerns	
William Nyallau Badak	Lubok Antu	2008	Barisan Nasional	Dropped by party	
Douglas Uggah Embas	Betong	1986	Barisan Nasional	Unable to contest due to PBB's single-seat policy	
William Ikom Mawan	Saratok	2013	Barisan Nasional	Unable to contest due to PBB's single-seat policy	
Norah Abdul Rahman	Tanjong Manis	2008	Barisan Nasional	Health concerns	
Wahab Dolah	Igan	2004	Barisan Nasional	Dropped by party	
Leo Michael Toyad	Mukah	1982	Barisan Nasional	Dropped by party	
Joseph Entulu Belaun	Selangau	2004	Barisan Nasional	Dropped by party	
Ahmad Lai Bujang	Sibuti	2008	Barisan Nasional	Health concerns	

== Endorsements ==
Newspapers, organisations and individuals endorsed parties or individual candidates for the election.

== Conduct ==
There had been many controversies even before the general election began, mostly regarding gerrymandering and the electoral boundary re-delineation in favour of the Barisan Nasional coalition. The body regulating elections in Malaysia, the Election Commission of Malaysia (which is under the control of the Prime Minister's Department), was criticised by election watchdogs, including Bersih, the Human Rights Commission of Malaysia and various other organisations for electoral malpractices, arbitrary decisions and a lack of transparency.

=== Gerrymandering ===
Opposition parties, non-governmental organisations and even politicians from the ruling party accused the government of gerrymandering, manipulating the composition of electoral seats in favour of Barisan Nasional. The opposition claims that the manipulation primarily involves merging opposition-dominated areas into large, single seats and dividing BN-favouring areas among several, smaller seats so as to favour rural voters who are more inclined to support the ruling party. An analyst with electoral reform group Tindak Malaysia estimates that this latest redelineation process would allow Barisan Nasional to regain control with just 33% of the vote.

The Electoral Integrity Project (EIP), an independent academic project based at Harvard University and the University of Sydney that studies election integrity and assigns PEI scores (Global Perceptions of Electoral Integrity) to countries across the world, had in its most recent research paper published in November 2017, ranked Malaysia's election integrity at 142nd out of 158 countries, just above Zimbabwe (143rd), Vietnam (147th) and Afghanistan (150th).

=== Polling day on midweek ===
Many Malaysians protested the Election Commission's decision to set the Polling Day on midweek (Wednesday, 9 May) rather than to set it on a weekend (i.e. Saturday) as it had been in the previous General Elections. Some of them, including Pakatan Harapan chairman Mahathir Mohamad, PAS deputy president Tuan Ibrahim Tuan Man and Bersih chairperson Maria Chin, viewed such a decision to be unfair, undemocratic, and an attempt to discourage people overseas or interstate from returning to their hometowns to vote. In response, Najib Razak declared Wednesday a national holiday.

=== Overseas ballot issues ===
Since the 2013 elections, overseas voting has been open to the majority of Malaysian registered voters living abroad. However, registered overseas Malaysian voters were reported to have received their ballots late, some even on election day, despite the election commission requiring their ballots to be returned before the close of polling stations to be counted as valid. As a result, many of these overseas voters organised on social media to bring theirs and other ballots back through casual couriers. The Election Commission of Malaysia currently denies trying to stop overseas Malaysians to vote.

=== Nomination Day controversies ===
Controversies erupted after six candidates for the opposition coalition, Pakatan Harapan, were disqualified from running under suspicious circumstances on Nomination Day (Saturday 28 April 2018). The most prominent disqualification was that of PKR vice-president Chua Tian Chang, who the local returning officer prevented from defending his Batu parliamentary seat due to an earlier court conviction, despite a High Court judgement which made clear he was eligible to continue as an MP. A subsequent High Court appeal was thrown out, under the claim that they did not have jurisdiction over election-related matters. Chua and his party are consequently endorsing independent candidate, 22-year-old P. Prabakaran, for the seat.

Meanwhile, in Rantau, Negeri Sembilan, the state's Chief Minister Mohamad Hasan was re-elected unopposed after opposition candidate Streram Sinnasamy was prevented from entering the nomination centre, ostensibly as he did not have an entry pass, despite his claim that he was never issued one and despite the fact that there are no laws requiring candidates to have entry passes. Four other opposition candidates were barred for being undischarged bankrupts, despite claims that earlier checks with the authorities had confirmed their ability to participate.

Lawyers and other political analysts criticised these returning officers for a "gross abuse of power" that went beyond their primary role (to assist with filing nomination papers) and deprived several candidates of the chance to exercise their democratic right. They claim that incidents like this contribute to the perception that Malaysian elections are inherently unfair and weaken the rule of law. Pakatan Harapan chairman Mahathir Mohamad confirmed that he would appeal these decisions to the courts, alleging an "abuse of power" by "officers who are willing to do illegal things on orders".

=== Alleged vote-buying ===
The ruling coalition, Barisan Nasional, faced criticism for alleged vote-buying. The Nikkei Asian Review noted that measures like cash bonuses being handed out to civil servants and pensioners, key components of its support base, occurred just before the dissolution of the lower house of Parliament, with other measures announced during the campaign trail including "special aid" of RM500 (US$127) and reserved social housing units for employees of government-linked company DRB-HICOM as well as minimum wage increases.

Within constituencies, Barisan Nasional MPs came under significant criticism from electoral watchdog Bersih, with seven out of ten individuals named in their "Election Offenses Hall of Shame" being from Barisan Nasional component parties. Musa Aman, Noh Omar, Hamzah Zainudin and Shahanim Mohd Yusuf (BN-UMNO) as well as P. Kamalanathan and Jaspal Singh (BN-MIC) were publicly reprimanded for handing out free food, petrol, furniture, groceries and motorcycles in their respective constituencies, in what was widely seen as an attempt to sway the vote in favour of them.

Controversy also erupted over Barisan Nasional's battle for the Sekinchan constituency, considered a marginal seat held by opposition party DAP, where an election event organised by Datuk Seri Jamal Yunos (the UMNO chief for Sungai Besar) in support of local candidate Lee Yee Yuan (BN-MCA) included an all-you-can-eat buffet, chances to win a motorcycle and a RM25,000 (US$6,345) cash prize, as well as a promise of a RM2,000 (US$508) payment for every voter if they are elected. All payments, along with a claimed RM150,000 in donations and a Mercedes-Benz C200 to be offered at the next event, were claimed to have been donated by "successful businessmen" in the small fishing village (population: 20,000) who wanted to show their "gratitude" to BN. While Yunos denies any wrongdoing, claiming that he is not a candidate but is "only conveying contributions from certain individuals," the Sekinchan DAP branch lodged a police report against him for alleged vote-buying.

Yunos also faced controversy for being caught on video handing out RM50 (US$13) notes from a bag at a function in the Sungai Leman Bendang Utara village, which is also part of Sekinchan. He claimed that those being paid were "party workers" responsible for "putting up flags, buntings and other materials," a claim that media were unable to independently verify. Media outlet Malaysiakini noted that most of those being paid were not dressed in Barisan Nasional colours, and that significant numbers of senior citizens and children were present at the event.

The main opposition alliance, Pakatan Harapan, was also not immune to allegations of vote-buying. Pakatan Harapan's manifesto, particularly, lists as a key promise the abolition of Malaysia's 6% GST and increasing minimum wages, which journalists and financial analysts claim amounts to pork-barrel populism that could negatively affect Malaysian government finances. Bersih also included Afif Bahardin (PH-PKR) on their Election Offenses Hall of Shame for utilising Penang state government programmes to give handouts such as hampers to voters in his constituency of Seberang Jaya.

Additionally, Ahmad Yakob, the Menteri Besar of Kelantan, was singled out for criticism after "repeatedly using Kelantan state government resources" to benefit the campaign of his party, PAS (competing as the main component of the Gagasan Sejahtera coalition), including by handing out cash to religious leaders in a state government hall covered in PAS flags.

=== Release of results ===
On polling night, the announcement of results took longer than usual, as it was alleged that the Election Commission officers were delaying their signing of Form 14 for announcing the results. This was later revealed in an interview between Mahathir and The Mekong Review, where he revealed that there were attempts to get winning PH candidates to cross over to BN and PAS, fearing that PH "were not going to respect the position of Islam as much as the previous government had". He added that they had already won as early as 8.30 pm but did not receive the official announcement until 2 AM.

=== Election observers ===
The Election Commission (EC) invited 14 countries to participate in the polls as foreign observers, comprising representatives of election management bodies from the Association of Southeast Asian Nations (ASEAN), Commonwealth of Nations, Asian and European countries as well as a study and support centre for the Malaysian Commonwealth Studies Centre based in Cambridge, United Kingdom. Seven countries agreed to send representatives to observe the elections, namely Azerbaijan, Cambodia, Indonesia, Kyrgyzstan, Maldives, Thailand and Timor-Leste. The invitation was also extended to India, Pakistan and Uzbekistan of which nine countries observers arrived on 7 May. The EC also appointed 1,236 election observers from 14 local non-governmental organisations.

== Results ==
The nationwide counting of votes began at 17:00 on 9 May. The decision to close the polling stations at 17:00 was met with protests by disgruntled would-be voters who contended that, given the longer-than-usual queues, the Election Commission (EC) could have extended the polling hours, as had been done in the previous elections.

The first unofficial result came from the constituency of Baram in Sarawak, which was won by Barisan Nasional (BN). Despite BN's early lead, by 20:30, Pakatan Harapan (PH) and BN were almost neck and neck. The states of Sarawak and Sabah, long regarded as BN's "fixed deposits", witnessed a significant swing in favour of PH and the Sabah Heritage Party (WARISAN) respectively. In a further blow to BN's chances, several leaders of BN's component parties, such as Subramaniam Sathasivam (MIC), Liow Tiong Lai (MCA) and Mah Siew Keong (Gerakan), were defeated in their respective constituencies by PH candidates. Mahathir Mohamad, PH's prime ministerial candidate, secured the constituency of Langkawi by 21:45. As the night wore on, it was reported that PH also retained the states of Penang and Selangor with larger majorities.

Stunned by the rapidly deteriorating turn of events, federal authorities attempted to stymie the release of unofficial election results. At 21:13, the Malaysian Communications and Multimedia Commission (MCMC) ordered Internet Service Providers (ISPs) to block Malaysiakini and its sister websites, which were providing live updates of the poll counting, on the grounds that the updates "may affect national stability, public order and harmony, and economic stability". Meanwhile, unmarked cars, allegedly carrying fake ballot boxes, were spotted entering some of the counting stations. Enraged onlookers tried to stop the cars, leading to sporadic rioting. The most serious rioting occurred in the town of Ayer Hitam in Johor; the rioters in the town were eventually dispersed by the Royal Malaysia Police's Federal Reserve Unit (FRU).

At about 23:20, Mahathir claimed during a press conference at the Sheraton Hotel in Petaling Jaya that PH had already exceeded the simple majority of 112 seats needed to form the federal government. He added that PH had successfully wrested the states of Negeri Sembilan, Malacca, Johor and Kedah from BN. However, Mahathir alleged that some EC officers were refusing to sign Form 14 in their respective constituencies, which is required for the results to be announced. He further warned that although "Malaysians are not violent people, they should not take this lying down".

Following the press conference, the EC started releasing the official election results just after midnight. However, the official results were continuously delayed and announced only gradually, as the counting of votes was said to be still ongoing in several places. At about 02:30, right after unofficial results had confirmed PH's simple majority, Mahathir, flanked by several PH leaders, gave another press conference, announcing that the Istana Negara (National Palace) had summoned the leader of the People's Justice Party (PKR) - the party whose logo was used by PH in the polls - and that he would be sworn in as the nation's seventh Prime Minister later that day.

Tellingly, BN's victory celebrations at Kuala Lumpur's Putra World Trade Centre, which had been customary in the event of a BN electoral victory, did not materialise. Instead, BN's top echelons held a closed door meeting at the private residence of the outgoing Prime Minister and BN chief, Najib Razak. This sparked fears that the defeated incumbent government would resort to martial law to cling to federal power. When informed of the coalition's impending defeat, a distraught Najib asked "do people really hate me that much?", while another BN politician told the press after the meeting that "whatever it is, we need to respect the will of the people". In any event, martial law was never touched upon in the meeting.

The EC announced the full official election results shortly before 05:00, where it was revealed that the states of Sabah and Perak were left with hung legislative assemblies. Meanwhile, the Gagasan Sejahtera (GS) coalition, led by the Malaysian Islamic Party (PAS), was not only able to retain Kelantan, it also captured the state of Terengganu from BN. Najib finally conceded defeat during a press conference at 11:00.

Party or alliance		Votes	%	Seats	+/–
Pakatan Harapan	People's Justice Party	2,041,301	16.89	47	+17
Pakatan Harapan	Democratic Action Party	2,098,336	17.37	42	+4
Pakatan Harapan	Malaysian United Indigenous Party	723,741	5.99	13	New
Pakatan Harapan	National Trust Party	655,528	5.43	11	New
Pakatan Harapan	Total	5,518,906	45.68	113	+45
Barisan Nasional	United Malays National Organisation	2,525,713	20.90	54	–34
Barisan Nasional	Parti Pesaka Bumiputera Bersatu	220,479	1.82	13	–1
Barisan Nasional	Parti Rakyat Sarawak	59,218	0.49	3	–3
Barisan Nasional	Malaysian Indian Congress	167,061	1.38	2	–2
Barisan Nasional	Progressive Democratic Party	59,853	0.50	2	–2
Barisan Nasional	Malaysian Chinese Association	653,612	5.41	1	–6
Barisan Nasional	Sarawak United Peoples' Party	122,540	1.01	1	0
Barisan Nasional	United Sabah Party	58,351	0.48	1	–3
Barisan Nasional	UPKO	57,062	0.47	1	–2
Barisan Nasional	Parti Bersatu Rakyat Sabah	11,783	0.10	1	0
Barisan Nasional	Parti Gerakan Rakyat Malaysia	128,973	1.07	0	–1
Barisan Nasional	Liberal Democratic Party	8,996	0.07	0	0
Barisan Nasional	People's Progressive Party	7,422	0.06	0	0
Barisan Nasional	Total	4,081,063	33.78	79	–54
Gagasan Sejahtera	Pan-Malaysian Islamic Party	2,032,094	16.82	18	–3
Gagasan Sejahtera	Malaysia National Alliance Party	9,025	0.07	0	New
Gagasan Sejahtera	Pan-Malaysian Islamic Front	81	0.00	0	0
Gagasan Sejahtera	Total	2,041,200	16.89	18	–3
Sabah Heritage Party		280,520	2.32	8	+8
United Sabah Alliance	Sabah People's Hope Party	37,708	0.31	0	New
United Sabah Alliance	Homeland Solidarity Party	21,361	0.18	1	New
United Sabah Alliance	Sabah Progressive Party	6,090	0.05	0	0
United Sabah Alliance	Sabah People's Unity Party	2,016	0.02	0	New
United Sabah Alliance	Total	67,175	0.56	1	+1
Love Sabah Party		8,603	0.07	0	New
Socialist Party of Malaysia		3,782	0.03	0	New
Parti Rakyat Malaysia		2,372	0.02	0	New
Malaysian United Party		2,102	0.02	0	New
State Reform Party		1,299	0.01	0	0
Sabah Native Co-operation Party		1,173	0.01	0	New
Parti Rakyat Gabungan Jaksa Pendamai		1,005	0.01	0	New
Penang Front Party		892	0.01	0	New
Parti Bansa Dayak Sarawak Baru		538	0.00	0	New
Love Malaysia Party		502	0.00	0	0
Parti Bumi Kenyalang		392	0.00	0	New
People's Alternative Party		302	0.00	0	New
Independents		71,153	0.59	3	+3
Total		12,082,979	100.00	222	0
Valid votes		12,082,979	98.24		
Invalid/blank votes		217,088	1.76		
Total votes		12,300,067	100.00		
Registered voters/turnout		14,940,624	82.33		
Source: ElectionData.MY

=== By state ===
State / federal territory	Barisan Nasional					Pakatan Harapan + Warisan					Gagasan Sejahtera					Other / Independent				
State / federal territory	Votes	%	Seats	%	±	Votes	%	Seats	%	±	Votes	%	Seats	%	±	Votes	%	Seats	%	±
Johor	581,928	38.6	8	31	13	819,786	54.4	18	69	13	105,389	7.0	0	0	0	818	0.1	0	0	0
Kedah	282,273	30.0	2	13	8	362,256	38.5	10	67	6	295,413	31.4	3	20	2	360	0.04	0	0	0
Kelantan	320,384	39.1	5	36	0	101,136	12.3	0	0	0	393,450	48.0	9	64	0	5373	0.65	0	0	0
Malacca	157,339	38.1	2	33	2	218,415	52.9	4	67	2	35,733	8.7	0	0	0	1,415	0.3	0	0	0
Negeri Sembilan	179,518	36.1	3	38	2	267,951	53.9	5	63	2	49,478	10.0	0	0	0	302	0.1	0	0	0
Pahang	285,912	43.2	9	64	1	204,965	30.9	5	36	2	170,686	25.8	0	0	1	1,007	0.1	0	0	0
Penang	177,631	22.5	2	15	1	543,298	68.8	11	85	1	65,005	8.2	0	0	0	3,191	0.4	0	0	0
Perak	395,355	33.2	11	46	▼1	597,901	50.3	13	54	5	193,551	16.3	0	0	2	2,460	0.2	0	0	0
Perlis	46,885	38.8	2	67	▼1	46,194	38.2	1	33	▲1	27,701	22.9	0	0	0	0	0	0	0	0
Sabah	335,587	39.8	10	40	12	417,435	49.5	14	56	11	13,295	1.6	0	0	0	76,784	9.1	1	4	1
Selangor	427,443	20.8	2	9	3	1,312,053	63.8	20	91	7	312,898	15.2	0	0	4	3,527	0.1	0	0	0
Terengganu	252,461	40.7	2	25	2	59,834	9.6	0	0	1	308,252	49.7	6	75	3	0	0	0	0	0
Sarawak	462,090	52.5	19	61	6	381,863	43.4	10	32	4	10,591	1.2	0	0	0	25,984	2.9	2	0	2
WP Kuala Lumpur	153,945	22.1	0	0	2	448,849	69.9	10	90.9	1	54,569	7.83	0	0	0	39,144	5.6	1	9.1	1
WP Labuan	10,164	47.6	1	100	0	8,714	40.8	0	0	0	1,555	7.3	0	0	0	925	4.33	0	0	0
WP Putrajaya	12,148	49.5	1	100	0	8,776	35.7	0	0	0	3,634	14.8	0	0	0	0	0	0	0	0
Total	4,081,063	33.8	79	35.6	54	5,799,426	48.0	121	54.5	54	2,041,200	16.9	18	8.1	3	161290	1.7	4	1.8	3

=== Seats that changed allegiance ===
No.	Seat	Previous Party (2013)	Current Party (2018)
P002	(Perlis) Kangar	Barisan Nasional (UMNO)	Pakatan Harapan (PKR)
P004	(Kedah) Langkawi	Barisan Nasional (UMNO)	Pakatan Harapan (BERSATU)
P005	(Kedah) Jerlun	Barisan Nasional (UMNO)	Pakatan Harapan (BERSATU)
P006	(Kedah) Kubang Pasu	Barisan Nasional (UMNO)	Pakatan Harapan (BERSATU)
P008	(Kedah) Pokok Sena	Gagasan Sejahtera (PAS)	Pakatan Harapan (AMANAH)
P011	(Kedah) Pendang	Barisan Nasional (UMNO)	Gagasan Sejahtera (PAS)
P012	(Kedah) Jerai	Barisan Nasional (UMNO)	Gagasan Sejahtera (PAS)
P013	(Kedah) Sik	Barisan Nasional (UMNO)	Gagasan Sejahtera (PAS)
P014	(Kedah) Merbok	Barisan Nasional (UMNO)	Pakatan Harapan (PKR)
P018	(Kedah) Kulim-Bandar Baharu	Barisan Nasional (UMNO)	Pakatan Harapan (PKR)
P034	(Terengganu) Setiu	Barisan Nasional (UMNO)	Gagasan Sejahtera (PAS)
P040	(Terengganu) Kemaman	Barisan Nasional (UMNO)	Gagasan Sejahtera (PAS)
P053	(Penang) Balik Pulau	Barisan Nasional (UMNO)	Pakatan Harapan (PKR)
P057	(Perak) Parit Buntar	Gagasan Sejahtera (PAS)	Pakatan Harapan (AMANAH)
P059	(Perak) Bukit Gantang	Gagasan Sejahtera (PAS)	Barisan Nasional (UMNO)
P062	(Perak) Sungai Siput	Socialist Party of Malaysia	Pakatan Harapan (PKR)
P063	(Perak) Tambun	Barisan Nasional (UMNO)	Pakatan Harapan (BERSATU)
P077	(Perak) Tanjong Malim	Barisan Nasional (MCA)	Pakatan Harapan (PKR)
P088	(Pahang) Temerloh	Gagasan Sejahtera (PAS)	Pakatan Harapan (AMANAH)
P089	(Pahang) Bentong	Barisan Nasional (MCA)	Pakatan Harapan (DAP)
P093	(Selangor) Sungai Besar	Barisan Nasional (UMNO)	Pakatan Harapan (BERSATU)
P094	Hulu Selangor	Barisan Nasional (MIC)	Pakatan Harapan (PKR)
P096	Kuala Selangor	Barisan Nasional (UMNO)	Pakatan Harapan (AMANAH)
P101	(Selangor) Hulu Langat	Gagasan Sejahtera (PAS)	Pakatan Harapan (AMANAH)
P108	(Selangor) Shah Alam	Gagasan Sejahtera (PAS)	Pakatan Harapan (AMANAH)
P111	(Selangor) Kota Raja	Gagasan Sejahtera (PAS)	Pakatan Harapan (AMANAH)
P113	(Selangor) Sepang	Gagasan Sejahtera (PAS)	Pakatan Harapan (AMANAH)
P115	(Kuala Lumpur) Batu	Pakatan Harapan (PKR)	Independent
P118	(Kuala Lumpur) Setiawangsa	Barisan Nasional (UMNO)	Pakatan Harapan (PKR)
P119	(Kuala Lumpur) Titiwangsa	Barisan Nasional (UMNO)	Pakatan Harapan (BERSATU)
P129	(Negeri Sembilan) Kuala Pilah	Barisan Nasional (UMNO)	Pakatan Harapan (BERSATU)
P133	(Negeri Sembilan) Tampin	Barisan Nasional (UMNO)	Pakatan Harapan (AMANAH)
P135	(Malacca) Alor Gajah	Barisan Nasional (MCA)	Pakatan Harapan (BERSATU)
P136	(Malacca) Tangga Batu	Barisan Nasional (UMNO)	Pakatan Harapan (PKR)
P140	(Johor) Segamat	Barisan Nasional (MIC)	Pakatan Harapan (PKR)
P141	(Johor) Sekijang	Barisan Nasional (UMNO)	Pakatan Harapan (PKR)
P142	(Johor) Labis	Barisan Nasional (MCA)	Pakatan Harapan (DAP)
P143	(Johor) Pagoh	Barisan Nasional (UMNO)	Pakatan Harapan (BERSATU)
P144	(Johor) Ledang	Barisan Nasional (UMNO)	Pakatan Harapan (PKR)
P146	(Johor) Muar	Barisan Nasional (UMNO)	Pakatan Harapan (BERSATU)
P149	(Johor) Sri Gading	Barisan Nasional (UMNO)	Pakatan Harapan (BERSATU)
P151	(Johor) Simpang Renggam	Barisan Nasional (GERAKAN)	Pakatan Harapan (BERSATU)
P158	(Johor) Tebrau	Barisan Nasional (MCA)	Pakatan Harapan (PKR)
P159	(Johor) Pasir Gudang	Barisan Nasional (UMNO)	Pakatan Harapan (PKR)
P160	Johor Bahru	Barisan Nasional (UMNO)	Pakatan Harapan (PKR)
P161	(Johor) Pulai	Barisan Nasional (UMNO)	Pakatan Harapan (AMANAH)
P165	(Johor) Tanjung Piai	Barisan Nasional (MCA)	Pakatan Harapan (BERSATU)
P169	(Sabah) Kota Belud	Barisan Nasional (UMNO)	WARISAN
P171	(Sabah) Sepanggar	Barisan Nasional (UMNO)	WARISAN
P173	(Sabah) Putatan	Barisan Nasional (UPKO)	Pakatan Harapan (PKR)
P174	(Sabah) Penampang	Pakatan Harapan (PKR)	WARISAN
P175	(Sabah) Papar	Barisan Nasional (UMNO)	WARISAN
P179	(Sabah) Ranau	Barisan Nasional (UPKO)	Pakatan Harapan (PKR)
P180	(Sabah) Keningau	Barisan Nasional (PBS)	United Sabah Alliance (STAR)
P181	(Sabah) Tenom	Barisan Nasional (UMNO)	Pakatan Harapan (DAP)
P185	(Sabah) Batu Sapi	Barisan Nasional (PBS)	WARISAN
P188	(Sabah) Silam	Barisan Nasional (UMNO)	WARISAN
P189	(Sabah) Semporna	Barisan Nasional (UMNO)	WARISAN
P190	(Sabah) Tawau	Barisan Nasional (PBS)	Pakatan Harapan (PKR)
P191	(Sabah) Kalabakan	Barisan Nasional (UMNO)	WARISAN
P192	(Sarawak) Mas Gading	Barisan Nasional (PDP)	Pakatan Harapan (DAP)
P198	(Sarawak) Puncak Borneo	Barisan Nasional (PBB)	Pakatan Harapan (PKR)
P203	(Sarawak) Lubok Antu	Barisan Nasional (PRS)	Independent
P205	(Sarawak) Saratok	Barisan Nasional (PDP)	Pakatan Harapan (PKR)
P209	(Sarawak) Julau	Barisan Nasional (PRS)	Independent
P214	(Sarawak) Selangau	Barisan Nasional (PRS)	Pakatan Harapan (PKR)

=== Members of the 13th Parliament who lost reelection in the 2018 election ===
No.	Constituency	Departing MP	First elected	Party
P004	Langkawi	Nawawi Ahmad	2013	BN (UMNO)
P005	Jerlun	Othman Aziz	2013	BN (UMNO)
P006	Kubang Pasu	Mohd Johari Baharum	2004	BN (UMNO)
P011	Pendang	Othman Abdul	1986	BN (UMNO)
P012	Jerai	Jamil Khir Baharom	2013	BN (UMNO)
P013	Sik	Mansor Abd Rahman	2013	BN (UMNO)
P018	Kulim-Bandar Baharu	Abdul Aziz Sheikh Fadzir	2013	BN (UMNO)
P040	Kemaman	Ahmad Shabery Cheek	2004	BN (UMNO)
P053	Balik Pulau	Hilmi Yahaya	2004	BN (UMNO)
P093	Sungai Besar	Budiman Mohd Zohdi	2016	BN (UMNO)
P096	Kuala Selangor	Irmohizam Ibrahim	2013	BN (UMNO)
P119	Titiwangsa	Johari Abdul Ghani	2013	BN (UMNO)
P129	Kuala Pilah	Hasan Malek	2004	BN (UMNO)
P133	Tampin	Shaziman Abu Mansor	1999	BN (UMNO)
P144	Ledang	Hamim Samuri	2004	BN (UMNO)
P146	Muar	Razali Ibrahim	2004	BN (UMNO)
P149	Sri Gading	Aziz Kaprawi	2013	BN (UMNO)
P160	Johor Bahru	Shahrir Abdul Samad	1978	BN (UMNO)
P161	Pulai	Nur Jazlan Mohamed	2004	BN (UMNO)
P169	Kota Belud	Abdul Rahman Dahlan	2008 (Note: Contested in Sepanggar)	BN (UMNO)
P175	Papar	Rosnah Shirlin	2004	BN (UMNO)
P188	Silam	Datu Nasrun Datu Mansur	2013	BN (UMNO)
P191	Kalabakan	Abdul Ghapur Salleh	2004	BN (UMNO)
P077	Tanjong Malim	Ong Ka Chuan	2008	BN (MCA)
P089	Bentong	Liow Tiong Lai	1999	BN (MCA)
P142	Labis	Chua Tee Yong	2008	BN (MCA)
P165	Tanjung Piai	Wee Jeck Seng	2008	BN (MCA)
P173	Putatan	Marcus Mojigoh	2004	BN (UPKO)
P179	Ranau	Ewon Ebin	2013	BN (UPKO)
P094	Hulu Selangor	P. Kamalanathan	2009	BN (MIC)
P140	Segamat	Subramaniam Sathasivam	2004	BN (MIC)
P076	Teluk Intan	Mah Siew Keong	1999	BN (GERAKAN)
P151	Simpang Renggam	Liang Teck Meng	2008	BN (GERAKAN)
P190	Tawau	Mary Yap Kain Ching	2013	BN (PBS)
P192	Mas Gading	Anthony Nogeh Gumbek	2013	BN (PDP)
P209	Julau	Joseph Salang Gandum	1999	BN (PRS)
P152	Kluang	Liew Chin Tong	2008 (Note: Contested in Ayer Hitam)	PH (DAP)
P036	Kuala Terengganu	Raja Kamarul Bahrin	2013	PH (AMANAH)
P059	Bukit Gantang	Idris Ahmad	2013	GS (PAS)
P088	Temerloh	Nasrudin Hassan	2013 (Note: Contested at Indera Mahkota)	GS (PAS)
P101	Hulu Langat	Che Rosli Che Mat	2008	GS (PAS)
P062	Sungai Siput	Michael Jeyakumar Devaraj	2008	PSM

== Aftermath ==
Pakatan's victory triggered nationwide celebrations, marking the end of a 61-year rule by Barisan Nasional (and preceding Alliance Party). Mahathir Mohamad was sworn in as the Prime Minister on the night of 10 May at the Istana Negara by Yang di Pertuan Agong Muhammad V, triggering more nationwide celebrations.

=== Defections and state government formations ===
The general election resulted in a hung parliament in the 60-seat Sabah State Legislative Assembly, after Barisan Nasional and the Warisan-Pakatan pact both won 29 seats in the election. This made the Homeland Solidarity Party (STAR) as the 'kingmakers', as the party won two state seats, giving them the power to give either bloc the mandate to form the state government. Considering that STAR is an opposition party, it was wildly expected for them to support a Warisan-led government. However, the party's leadership chose to support a Barisan government instead, sparking mass protests across the state by opposition supporters. As such, Barisan Nasional, with the support of STAR, formed the next Sabah state government, with Musa Aman chosen as Chief Minister. However, the formation of government did not last long after one of Barisan's component parties, the United Pasokmomogun Kadazandusun Murut Organisation (now United Progressive Kinabalu Organisation; UPKO), which won five state seats, withdrew from the coalition and announced support for a Warisan-led government in Sabah. Warisan president, Shafie Apdal, was later sworn in as the new Sabah Chief Minister the day after. On the same day, another Sabah-based Barisan Nasional component party, the Liberal Democratic Party (LDP), also announced their withdrawal from the coalition, citing their poor performance in the election, losing in every constituency they contested in.

The day afterwards, another two Sabah-based Barisan Nasional component party, the United Sabah People's Party (PBRS) and the United Sabah Party (PBS), also announced that they had left Barisan. PBRS stated that they would seek an alliance with Pakatan Harapan and would apply for membership in the ruling party coalition, while PBS stated that they are seeking to form a new Sabah-based coalition, compromising of all Sabah Opposition parties. In 2020, after vowing for new coalitions, made for all Sabah-based parties, the Gabungan Rakyat Sabah (GRS) finally created to take over Shafie's WARISAN+ government, having secure simple majority under Hajiji Noor, former Sabah UMNO member.

Meanwhile, the general election also resulted in a hung parliament in the 59-seat Perak State Legislative Assembly, in which Pakatan won 29 seats, two short of a majority, while Barisan and the Pan-Malaysian Islamic Party (PAS) each won 27 and 3 seats. This would mean neither of the three parties would have enough seats to form the Perak state government. PAS proposed the formation of a unity government compromising of all sides in the State Legislative Assembly, but was rejected by Pakatan. However, Pakatan succeeded in forming the state government after two Barisan assemblymen announced their support for Pakatan to form the state government, thus ending the hung parliament status-quo. Their action resulted in the two assemblymen having their UMNO membership dropped, meaning they would have to stand as an Independent in the Perak State Legislative Assembly. Perak Pakatan chairman, Ahmad Faizal Azumu, was later sworn in as the new Menteri Besar of Perak on 12 May.

On the same day, three Johor BN assemblymen announced that they had left the coalition to join PPBM. Their defection gives Pakatan a total of 39 seats, giving them a two-thirds majority in the 56-seat State Legislative Assembly. Subsequently, two Independent MPs, Lubok Antu MP, Jugah Muyang, and Julau MP, Larry Sng Wei Shien, announced that they had joined PKR. Jugah Muyang won in a three-cornered fight against both Barisan and PKR, while the latter was endorsed by Pakatan against Barisan Nasional. A third Independent MP, Prabakaran Parameswaran, who won in the constituency of Batu, announced that he had joined PKR in the day afterwards, thus increasing Pakatan's total tally in the Dewan Rakyat to 125. He was endorsed by Pakatan Harapan during the general election after the coalition's original candidate, Tian Chua, was disqualified from contesting due to a RM2,000 fine. On the following day, an Independent Perak assemblyman, Zainol Fadzi Paharudin, who was one of the two Barisan assemblymen who had their UMNO membership dropped for supporting a Pakatan government, announced that he had joined PPBM, His defection from Barisan to Pakatan increases the coalition's tally in the Perak State Legislative Assembly to 30 seats, enough to form a simple majority.

On 19 May the disputed president of the People's Progressive Party (myPPP), M. Kayveas, declared that the party had left Barisan Nasional. However, Kayveas' statement was denied by the party's deputy secretary-general, Simon Sabapathy, who insisted that the party was still part of the coalition and that Kayveas' announcement was invalid as he was no longer the president of the party, after he was supposedly sacked by the party on April. This resulted in a party leadership crisis, as the party's leadership was split between the party's former president, M. Kayveas, who's pursuing to make the party leave Barisan, and the party's current president, Maglin Dennis D'Cruz, who wants the party to remain in Barisan. Eventually, Kayveas won the struggle, and announced that myPPP had left Barisan. The party would eventually be de-registered by the Registrar of Societies in January 2019, amid the leadership dispute.

Nearly a month after the General Election, on 12 June, another four BN component parties, the United Bumiputera Heritage Party (PBB), the Sarawak People's Party (PRS), the Sarawak United People's Party (SUPP) and the Progressive Democratic Party (PDP) announced their withdrawal from Barisan Nasional and the formation of a new Sarawak-based coalition, the Gabungan Parti Sarawak (GPS). The four parties altogether had 19 seats in the Dewan Rakyat and 72 seats in the 82-seat Sarawak State Legislative Assembly, thus decreasing Barisan's seat tally even further. Two weeks later, on 24 June, the Malaysian People's Movement Party (Gerakan) became the latest party to leave Barisan Nasional.

The election resulted in a mass defection of UMNO MPs from the party, mostly becoming independents, some eventually changing their alliance and joining PH. On 24 June, the MP of Bagan Serai, Noor Azmi Ghazali, announced his withdrawal from the coalition to become an Independent Member of Parliament, and expressed interest to join the Malaysian United Indigenous Party (PPBM), a component party of Pakatan Harapan. Three days later, UMNO's Bukit Gantang MP, Syed Abu Hussin Hafiz Syed Abdul Fasal, announced his departure from the party to also become an Independent Member of Parliament. Further on 1 July, UMNO's Masjid Tanah MP, Mas Ermieyati Samsudin left the party to become an Independent Parliamentarian after disappointment with the party's election result. Two more defections occurred in the month of September. UMNO's Jeli MP, Mustapa Mohamed, left the party on 18 September, proceeded by UMNO's Kimanis MP, Anifah Aman, the day after. On 11 October, UMNO's Labuan MP, Rozman Isli, left the party and joined Warisan, citing for the benefit of Labuan. Another series of defections occurred in December. On 12 December, five Sabah UMNO MPs and nine of the state assemblypersons left the party to become independents, pledging support for Pakatan. On 14 December, six UMNO MPs, Hamzah Zainudin (Larut), Ikmal Hisham Abdul Aziz (Tanah Merah), Abdul Latiff Ahmad (Mersing), Rosol Wahid (Hulu Terengganu), Mohd Fasiah Mohd Fakeh (Sabak Bernam) and Shabudin Yahaya (Tasik Gelugor) altogether left the party due to disappointment with UMNO's current leadership. The series of defections and parties withdrawing from Barisan Nasional leaves the coalition with only three component parties, UMNO, MCA and MIC (the original three parties that formed the Alliance Party), a decrease of ten parties from the 13 they had prior to the election, and 40 seats, a substantial decrease from the 79 seats they won in the election, with the formations of Sarawak-based GPS in 2018 and Sabah-based GRS in 2020, separately governing both states.

=== Party leadership changes ===
After facing a defeat in the election, losing nearly a third of its seats in the Dewan Rakyat, former prime minister Najib Razak announced his resignation as president of UMNO and chairman of Barisan Nasional on 12 May. Party deputy president Ahmad Zahid Hamidi took over the role as acting president of UMNO and chairman of Barisan Nasional, while vice-president Hishammuddin Hussein took over the duties of acting deputy president and deputy chairman of Barisan. Najib's resignation resulted in a party leadership election, in which seven candidates eyed to become the party's new president. The result was that Zahid won the party leadership elections. He and former Negeri Sembilan Menteri Besar Mohamad Hasan are now president and vice president of UMNO respectively.

=== 2020 political crisis ===
PH government, however, served just 22 months before the take over of administration by PN, led by Muhyiddin Yassin, who was sworn in as the 8th Prime Minister on 1 March 2020. This came after PH lost its majority in the Dewan Rakyat following the withdrawal of Muhyiddin's party PPBM from PH, as well as defection of MPs led by Azmin Ali from PKR. Change in government of states of Johor, Malacca and Perak, followed suit. Kedah, on the other hand, is still governed by PH in spite of PPBM's withdrawal from PH until 17 May 2020 when PN took over of state government.

== Popular culture ==
- Rise: Ini Kalilah was a 2018 Malaysian political drama film based on the actual events on 9 May 2018 in the aftermath of the 14th General Election.
- The election is also the subject of the 2019 documentary film M for Malaysia.

== See also ==
- List of candidates in the 2018 Malaysian general election
- List of Malaysian electoral districts
- 2018 Malaysian state elections
- 1Malaysia Development Berhad scandal
- International reactions to the 2018 Malaysian general election
