= List of longest-serving members of the Parliament of Malaysia =

This is a list of Members of the Malaysian Parliament who have served for at least 30 years. The time of service is not always continuous and separate terms are aggregated. This list includes MPs who served in the past and who continue to serve in the present.

A total of 31 individuals have served in excess of 30 years in Parliament as of 2024. Thus far the only female MPs to have served longer than 30 years are Rafidah Aziz and Rohani Abdul Karim.

== Members of Parliament who have served for at least 30 years ==
| Party | Name | Constituency | Year elected | Year left | Reason | Serving years | Highest office held | Refs |
|---|---|---|---|---|---|---|---|---|
| Alliance (UMNO) | Mahathir Mohamad | Kota Star Selatan | 1964 | 1969 | Defeated | 40 | Prime Minister | |
| BN (UMNO) | Mahathir Mohamad | Kubang Pasu | 1974 | 2004 | Not Contested | 40 | Prime Minister | |
| PH (BERSATU) | Mahathir Mohamad | Langkawi | 2018 | 2020 | Defected | 40 | Prime Minister | |
| Independent | Mahathir Mohamad | Langkawi | 2020 | 2021 | Defected | 40 | Prime Minister | |
| PEJUANG | Mahathir Mohamad | Langkawi | 2021 | 2022 | Defeated | 40 | Prime Minister | |
| Alliance (UMNO) | Abdul Ghafar Baba | Malacca Utara | 1971 | 1974 | Transferred | 34 | Deputy Prime Minister | |
| BN (UMNO) | Abdul Ghafar Baba | Alor Gajah | 1974 | 1978 | Transferred | 34 | Deputy Prime Minister | |
| BN (UMNO) | Abdul Ghafar Baba | Jasin | 1978 | 1999 | Transferred | 34 | Deputy Prime Minister | |
| BN (UMNO) | Abdul Ghafar Baba | Batu Berendam | 1999 | 2004 | Not Contested | 34 | Deputy Prime Minister | |
| Alliance (BUMIPUTERA) | Abdul Taib Mahmud | Samarahan | 1971 | 1990 | Transferred | 38 | Cabinet Minister | |
| BN (PBB) | Abdul Taib Mahmud | Samarahan | 1971 | 1990 | Transferred | 38 | Cabinet Minister | |
| BN (PBB) | Abdul Taib Mahmud | Kota Samarahan | 1990 | 2008 | Not Contested | 38 | Cabinet Minister | |
| DAP | Lim Kit Siang | Bandar Malacca | 1971 | 1974 | Transferred | 47 | Leader of the Opposition | |
| DAP | Lim Kit Siang | Kota Melaka | 1974 | 1978 | Transferred | 47 | Leader of the Opposition | |
| DAP | Lim Kit Siang | Petaling | 1978 | 1982 | Transferred | 47 | Leader of the Opposition | |
| DAP | Lim Kit Siang | Kota Melaka | 1982 | 1986 | Transferred | 47 | Leader of the Opposition | |
| DAP | Lim Kit Siang | Tanjong | 1986 | 1999 | Defeated | 47 | Leader of the Opposition | |
| DAP | Lim Kit Siang | Ipoh Timor | 2004 | 2013 | Transferred | 47 | Leader of the Opposition | |
| DAP | Lim Kit Siang | Gelang Patah | 2013 | 2018 | Transferred | 47 | Leader of the Opposition | |
| PH (DAP) | Lim Kit Siang | Iskandar Puteri | 2018 | 2022 | Not Contested | 47 | Leader of the Opposition | |
| BN (UMNO) | Tengku Razaleigh Hamzah | Ulu Kelantan | 1974 | 1986 | Transferred | 48 | Cabinet Minister | |
| BN (UMNO) | Tengku Razaleigh Hamzah | Gua Musang | 1986 | 1990 | Defected | 48 | Cabinet Minister | |
| S46 | Tengku Razaleigh Hamzah | Gua Musang | 1990 | 1999 | Defected | 48 | Cabinet Minister | |
| BN (UMNO) | Tengku Razaleigh Hamzah | Gua Musang | 1999 | 2022 | Defeated | 48 | Cabinet Minister | |
| BN (MCA) | Ling Liong Sik | Mata Kuching | 1974 | 1986 | Transferred | 31 | Cabinet Minister | |
| BN (MCA) | Ling Liong Sik | Labis | 1986 | 2004 | Not Contested | 31 | Cabinet Minister | |
| BN (PBB) | Sulaiman Daud | Santubong | 1974 | 1990 | Transferred | 31 | Cabinet Minister | |
| BN (PBB) | Sulaiman Daud | Petra Jaya | 1990 | 2004 | Not Contested | 31 | Cabinet Minister | |
| SNAP | Leo Moggie Irok | Kanowit | 1974 | 1976 | Defected | 31 | Cabinet Minister | |
| BN (SNAP) | Leo Moggie Irok | Kanowit | 1976 | 2004 | Not Contested | 31 | Cabinet Minister | |
| BN (MIC) | Samy Vellu | Sungei Siput | 1974 | 1986 | Transferred | 35 | Cabinet Minister | |
| BN (MIC) | Samy Vellu | Sungai Siput | 1986 | 2008 | Defeated | 35 | Cabinet Minister | |
| BN (UMNO) | Rais Yatim | Jelebu | 1974 | 1990 | Defected | 32 | Cabinet Minister | |
| BN (UMNO) | Rais Yatim | Jelebu | 1999 | 2013 | Not Contested | 32 | Cabinet Minister | |
| BN (UMNO) | Najib Razak | Pekan | 1976 | 1982 | Transferred | 43 | Prime Minister | |
| BN (UMNO) | Najib Razak | Pekan | 1986 | 2022 | Imprisonment | 43 | Prime Minister | |
| BN (UMNO) | Abdullah Ahmad Badawi | Kepala Batas | 1978 | 2013 | Not Contested | 36 | Prime Minister | |
| BN (UMNO) | Abdul Kadir Sheikh Fadzir | Kulim-Bandar Bahru | 1978 | 1986 | Transferred | 31 | Cabinet Minister | |
| BN (UMNO) | Abdul Kadir Sheikh Fadzir | Kulim-Bandar Baharu | 1986 | 2008 | Not Contested | 31 | Cabinet Minister | |
| DAP | Karpal Singh | Jelutong | 1978 | 1999 | Defeated | 33 | MP | |
| DAP | Karpal Singh | Bukit Gelugor | 2004 | 2014 | Died | 33 | MP | |
| BN (UMNO) | Rafidah Aziz | Selayang | 1978 | 1982 | Transferred | 36 | Cabinet Minister | |
| BN (UMNO) | Rafidah Aziz | Kuala Kangsar | 1982 | 2013 | Not Contested | 36 | Cabinet Minister | |
| BN (UMNO) | Muhyiddin Yassin | Pagoh | 1978 | 1986 | Transferred | 37 | Prime Minister | |
| BN (UMNO) | Muhyiddin Yassin | Pagoh | 1995 | 2016 | Defected | 37 | Prime Minister | |
| BERSATU | Muhyiddin Yassin | Pagoh | 2016 | 2018 | Defected | 37 | Prime Minister | |
| PH (BERSATU) | Muhyiddin Yassin | Pagoh | 2018 | 2020 | Defected | 37 | Prime Minister | |
| PN (BERSATU) | Muhyiddin Yassin | Pagoh | 2020 | | Serving | 37 | Prime Minister | |
| BN (UMNO) | Anwar Ibrahim | Permatang Pauh | 1982 | 1998 | Defected | 31 | Prime Minister | |
| Independent | Anwar Ibrahim | Permatang Pauh | 1998 | 1999 | Imprisonment | 31 | Prime Minister | |
| PKR | Anwar Ibrahim | Permatang Pauh | 2008 | 2015 | Imprisonment | 31 | Prime Minister | |
| PH (PKR) | Anwar Ibrahim | Port Dickson | 2018 | 2022 | Transferred | 31 | Prime Minister | |
| PH (PKR) | Anwar Ibrahim | Tambun | 2022 | | Serving | 31 | Prime Minister | |
| DAP | Tan Seng Giaw | Kepong | 1982 | 2018 | Not Contested | 37 | Vice-Chairman of the Public Accounts Committee | |
| BN (PBB) | Leo Michael Toyad | Mukah | 1982 | 2018 | Not Contested | 37 | Cabinet Minister | |
| BN (PBS) | Joseph Pairin Kitingan | Keningau | 1986 | 1990 | Defected | 33 | Chief Minister | |
| PBS | Joseph Pairin Kitingan | Keningau | 1990 | 2004 | Defected | 33 | Chief Minister | |
| BN (PBS) | Joseph Pairin Kitingan | Keningau | 2004 | 2018 | Not Contested | 33 | Chief Minister | |
| DAP | Tan Kok Wai | Sungai Besi | 1986 | 1995 | Transferred | 38 | Special Envoy | |
| DAP | Tan Kok Wai | Cheras | 1995 | 2018 | Defected | 38 | Special Envoy | |
| PH (DAP) | Tan Kok Wai | Cheras | 2018 | | Serving | 38 | Special Envoy | |
| DAP | Lim Guan Eng | Kota Melaka | 1986 | 1999 | Imprisonment | 29 | Cabinet Minister | |
| DAP | Lim Guan Eng | Bagan | 2008 | 2018 | Defected | 29 | Cabinet Minister | |
| PH (DAP) | Lim Guan Eng | Bagan | 2018 | | Serving | 29 | Cabinet Minister | |
| BN (PBB) | Douglas Uggah Embas | Betong | 1986 | 2018 | Not Contested | 33 | Cabinet Minister | |
| BN (PBB) | Wan Junaidi Tuanku Jaafar | Batang Lupar | 1990 | 2004 | Transferred | 32 | Yang di-Pertua Negeri of Sarawak | |
| BN (PBB) | Wan Junaidi Tuanku Jaafar | Santubong | 2004 | 2018 | Defected | 32 | Yang di-Pertua Negeri of Sarawak | |
| GPS (PBB) | Wan Junaidi Tuanku Jaafar | Santubong | 2018 | 2022 | Not Contested | 32 | Yang di-Pertua Negeri of Sarawak | |
| BN (PBB) | Rohani Abdul Karim | Santubong | 1990 | 2004 | Transferred | 32 | Cabinet Minister | |
| BN (PBB) | Rohani Abdul Karim | Batang Lupar | 2004 | 2018 | Defected | 32 | Cabinet Minister | |
| GPS (PBB) | Rohani Abdul Karim | Batang Lupar | 2018 | 2022 | Not Contested | 32 | Cabinet Minister | |
| Independent | Richard Riot Jaem | Serian | 1990 | 1995 | Defected | 34 | Cabinet Minister | |
| BN (SUPP) | Richard Riot Jaem | Serian | 1995 | 2018 | Defected | 34 | Cabinet Minister | |
| GPS (SUPP) | Richard Riot Jaem | Serian | 2018 | | Serving | 34 | Cabinet Minister | |
| PAS | Abdul Hadi Awang | Marang | 1990 | 2004 | Defeated | 30 | Leader of the Opposition | |
| PAS | Abdul Hadi Awang | Marang | 2008 | 2020 | Defected | 30 | Leader of the Opposition | |
| PN (PAS) | Abdul Hadi Awang | Marang | 2020 | | Serving | 30 | Leader of the Opposition | |
| DAP | Fong Kui Lun | Klang | 1990 | 1995 | Defeated | 30 | MP | |
| DAP | Fong Kui Lun | Bukit Bintang | 1999 | 2018 | Defected | 30 | MP | |
| PH (DAP) | Fong Kui Lun | Bukit Bintang | 2018 | | Serving | 30 | MP | |
| BN (UMNO) | Ahmad Zahid Hamidi | Bagan Datoh | 1995 | 2018 | Transferred | 30 | Deputy Prime Minister | |
| BN (UMNO) | Ahmad Zahid Hamidi | Bagan Datuk | 2018 | | Serving | 30 | Deputy Prime Minister | |
| BN (UMNO) | Hishammuddin Hussein | Tenggara | 1995 | 2004 | Transferred | 30 | Senior Minister | |
| BN (UMNO) | Hishammuddin Hussein | Sembrong | 2004 | | Serving | 30 | Senior Minister | |
| BN (UMNO) | Shafie Apdal | Semporna | 1995 | 2016 | Defected | 30 | Cabinet Minister | |
| WARISAN | Shafie Apdal | Semporna | 2016 | | Serving | 30 | Cabinet Minister | |

== Members of Parliament who have currently served for at least 25 years ==
| Party | Name | Constituency | Year elected | Year left | Reason | Serving years | Highest office held | Refs |
|---|---|---|---|---|---|---|---|---|
| DAP | Teresa Kok Suh Sim | Seputeh | 1999 | 2018 | Defected | 25 | Cabinet Minister | |
| PH (DAP) | Teresa Kok Suh Sim | Seputeh | 2018 | | Serving | 25 | Cabinet Minister | |
| BN (UMNO) | Mohamed Khaled Nordin | Johor Bahru | 1990 | 2004 | Transferred | 25 | Cabinet Minister | |
| BN (UMNO) | Mohamed Khaled Nordin | Pasir Gudang | 2004 | 2013 | Not Contested | 25 | Cabinet Minister | |
| BN (UMNO) | Mohamed Khaled Nordin | Kota Tinggi | 2022 | | Serving | 25 | Cabinet Minister | |
| BN (UMNO) | Ronald Kiandee | Beluran | 1999 | 2018 | Defected | 25 | Cabinet Minister | |
| PH (BERSATU) | Ronald Kiandee | Beluran | 2018 | 2020 | Defected | 25 | Cabinet Minister | |
| PN (BERSATU) | Ronald Kiandee | Beluran | 2020 | | Serving | 25 | Cabinet Minister | |
| BN (UMNO) | Bung Moktar Radin | Kinabatangan | 1999 | 2025 | Died | 25 | MP | |
| BN (PBB) | Alexander Nanta Linggi | Kapit | 1999 | 2018 | Defected | 25 | Cabinet Minister | |
| GPS (PBB) | Alexander Nanta Linggi | Kapit | 2018 | | Serving | 25 | Cabinet Minister | |
| BN (PDP) | Tiong King Sing | Bintulu | 1999 | 2018 | Defected | 25 | Cabinet Minister | |
| GPS (PDP) | Tiong King Sing | Bintulu | 2018 | | Serving | 25 | Cabinet Minister | |
| BN (PBB) | Henry Sum Agong | Bukit Mas | 1999 | 2008 | Transferred | 25 | Deputy Minister | |
| BN (PBB) | Henry Sum Agong | Lawas | 2008 | 2018 | Defected | 25 | Deputy Minister | |
| GPS (PBB) | Henry Sum Agong | Lawas | 2018 | | Serving | 25 | Deputy Minister | |

== Members of Parliament who have currently served for at least 20 years ==
| Party | Name | Constituency | Year elected | Year left | Reason | Serving years | Highest office held | Refs |
|---|---|---|---|---|---|---|---|---|
| DAP | M. Kulasegaran | Teluk Intan | 1997 | 1999 | Defeated | 23 | Deputy Minister | |
| DAP | M. Kulasegaran | Ipoh Barat | 2004 | 2018 | Defected | 23 | Deputy Minister | |
| PH (DAP) | M. Kulasegaran | Ipoh Barat | 2018 | | Serving | 23 | Deputy Minister | |
| BN (UMNO) | Ismail Muttalib | Maran | 2004 | 2022 | Defected | 21 | Deputy Minister | |
| PN (PAS) | Ismail Muttalib | Maran | 2022 | | Serving | 21 | Deputy Minister | |
| BN (UMNO) | Ismail Sabri Yaakob | Bera | 2004 | | Serving | 21 | Prime Minister | |
| BN (MCA) | Wee Ka Siong | Ayer Hitam | 2004 | | Serving | 21 | Cabinet Minister | |
| BN (UMNO) | Azalina Othman Said | Pengerang | 2004 | | Serving | 21 | Cabinet Minister | |
| DAP | Chong Chieng Jen | Bandar Kuching | 2004 | 2018 | Transferred | 21 | Deputy Minister | |
| PH (DAP) | Chong Chieng Jen | Stampin | 2018 | | Serving | 21 | Deputy Minister | |
