= Ministry of Tourism, Arts and Culture =

Government ministry of Malaysia

Ministry of Tourism, Arts and Culture (MOTAC)
- Kementerian Pelancongan, Seni dan Budaya
- Coat of arms of Malaysia

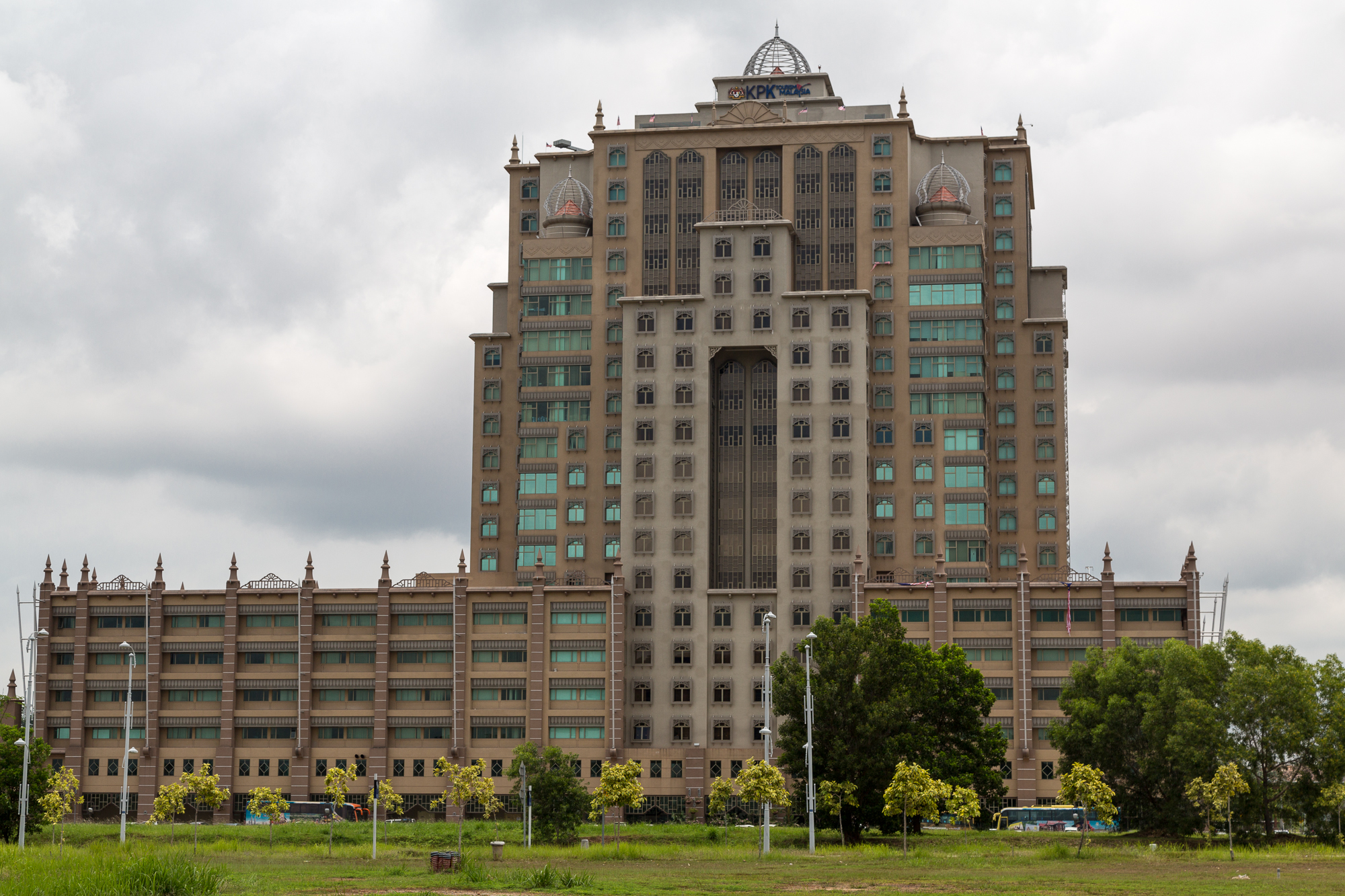

Ministry overview
- Formed: 16 May 2013; 13 years ago
- Preceding Ministry: Ministry of Information, Communications and Culture
- Jurisdiction: Government of Malaysia
- Headquarters: No. 2, Tower 1, P5/6 Road, Precinct 5, Federal Government Administrative Centre, 62200 Putrajaya
- Employees: 3,161 (2017)
- Annual budget: MYR 1,567,627,800 (2026)
- Minister responsible: Dato Sri Tiong King Sing, Minister of Tourism, Arts and Culture
- Deputy Minister responsible: Chiew Choon Man, Deputy Minister of Tourism, Arts and Culture
- Ministry executives: Dato' Shaharuddin bin Abu Sohot, Secretary-General; Chua Choon Hwa, Deputy Secretary-General (Tourism); Dato' Mohd Yusri bin Mohd Yusoff, Deputy Secretary-General (Culture); Datuk Surrendren Sathasivam, Deputy Secretary-General (Management)
- Child agencies: National Department for Culture and Arts; Tourism Malaysia; National Archives of Malaysia; Islamic Tourism Center (Malaysia); Istana Budaya
- Website: www.motac.gov.my

Footnotes
- Ministry of Tourism, Arts and Culture on Facebook

The Ministry of Tourism, Arts and Culture (Malay: Kementerian Pelancongan, Seni dan Budaya) is a ministry of the Government of Malaysia that is responsible for tourism, culture, archives, library, museum, heritage, arts, theatre, handicraft, visual arts, convention, exhibitions, Islamic tourism and craft.

The Minister of Tourism, Arts and Culture administers his functions through the Ministry of Tourism, Arts and Culture and a range of other government agencies. In the Anwar Ibrahim cabinet, the ministry was renamed to Ministry of Tourism with the removal of arts and culture portfolios from the name.

Its headquarters is in Putrajaya.

== Organization ==
- Minister of Tourism, Arts and Culture
  - Deputy Minister
    - Secretary-General
      - Under the Authority of Secretary-General
        - Office of the Legal Adviser
        - Key Performance Indicators and Empowerment of Bumiputera Agenda Unit
        - Integrity Unit
        - Internal Audit Unit
        - Corporate Communications Unit
      - Deputy Secretary-General (Tourism)
        - Tourism Policies and International Relationship Division
        - License and Enforcement Division
        - Industry Development Division
        - Malaysia Tourism Information Centre (MATIC)
      - Deputy Secretary-General (Culture)
        - Cultural Policies Division
        - International Cultural Relationship Division
        - Event Management Division
      - Deputy Secretary-General (Management)
        - Finance Division
        - Human Resources Division
        - Account Division
        - Infrastructure Development Division
        - Information Management Division
        - Management Division
        - State MOTAC Offices

== Ministers ==
| Minister | Portrait | Office | Executive Experience |
|---|---|---|---|
| Tiong King Sing | | Minister of Tourism, Arts and Culture | MP for Bintulu (November 1999 – current); Chairman of the Barisan Nasional Backbenchers Club (April 2008 – June 2013); Special Envoy of the Prime Minister to East Asia (January 2014 – June 2018); Special Envoy of the Prime Minister to China (April 2020 – November 2022); MLA for Dudong (November 2021 – current) |
| Chiew Choon Man | | Deputy Minister of Tourism, Arts and Culture | MP for Miri (November 2022 – current) |

== See also ==
- Minister of Tourism (Malaysia)
