= Seniority in the Parliament of Malaysia =

This is a complete list of members of the Parliament of Malaysia based on seniority as of 13 September 2018.

== Seniority ==
Seniority of members are determined by the Yang di-Pertuan Agong. But based on common practice, members are ranked by the number of consecutive terms as either Senator or Member of the House and seniority date (i.e. date of first swearing in as either Senator of Member of the House). Senators and Members of the House who swear in on the same day are later ordered numerically according to the Hansard.

== Vacancies ==
=== Senate ===
- 21 December 2022 — 19 vacancies occurred on the opening of the present Parliament.

== Current seniority list ==
Note that the italicised name of constituency represents that of the Senate.

Name	M.	C.	Current Party	Seniority Date	CTN	Previous terms	Remarks
Tan Kok Wai	House	P123 Cheras	PH–DAP	6 October 1986	9	7th–15th	Former MP for Sungai Besi; Special Envoy of the Prime Minister to China (2018-2020)
Richard Riot Jaem	House	P199 Serian	GPS–SUPP	3 December 1990	8	8th–15th	Special Envoy of the Prime Minister to East Asia (2020-2022) Minister (2013-2018)
Mahiaddin Md Yasin	House	P143 Pagoh	PN-BERSATU	7 June 1995	9	5th–6th, 9th–15th	Prime Minister (2020-2021); Deputy Prime Minister (2009-2015); Minister (1995-2015, 2018-2020); Deputy Minister (1982-1986); Parliamentary Secretary (1981-1982)
Hishammuddin Hussein	House	P153 Sembrong	BN–UMNO	7 June 1995	7	9th–15th	Former MP for Tenggara; Minister (1999-2018, 2020-2022)
Mohd. Shafie Apdal	House	P189 Semporna	WARISAN	7 June 1995	7	9th–15th	Minister (2004-2015)
Ahmad Zahid Hamidi	House	P075 Bagan Datuk	BN–UMNO	7 June 1995	7	9th–15th	Deputy Prime Minister (2015-2018, 2022-present); Leader of the Opposition (2018-2019)
Alexander Nanta Linggi	House	P215 Kapit	GPS–PBB	20 December 1999	6	10th–15th	Minister (since 2020); Deputy Minister (2013-2018)
Henry Sum Agong	House	P222 Lawas	GPS–PBB	20 December 1999	6	10th–15th	Deputy Minister (2015-2018, 2020-2022) Former MP for Bukit Mas
Tiong King Sing	House	P217 Bintulu	GPS–PDP	20 December 1999	6	10th–15th	Minister (since 2022) Special Envoy of the Prime Minister to China (2020-2022)
Ronald Kiandee	House	P183 Beluran	PN-BERSATU	20 December 1999	6	10th–15th	Minister (since 2020); Deputy Speaker of the House (2008-2018), Chairman of PAC (2018-2019)
Teresa Kok Suh Sim	House	P122 Seputeh	PH–DAP	20 December 1999	6	10th–15th	Minister (2018-2020)
Fong Kui Lun	House	P120 Bukit Bintang	PH–DAP	20 December 1999	7	8th, 10th–15th	
Kula Segaran Murugeson	House	P065 Ipoh Barat	PH–DAP	14 July 1997	6	9th, 11th–15th	Former MP for Telok Intan Minister (2018-2020)
Azalina Othman Said	House	P157 Pengerang	BN–UMNO	17 May 2004	5	11th–15th	Deputy Speaker of the House (2020-2021); Minister (2004-2009, 2015-2018, since 2022)
Fadillah Yusof	House	P194 Petra Jaya	GPS–PBB	17 May 2004	5	11th–15th	Deputy Prime Minister (2022-present) Senior Minister (2020-2022); Minister (2013-2018, since 2020)
Aaron Ago Dagang	House	P210 Kanowit	GPS–PRS	17 May 2004	5	11th–15th	Deputy Minister (2020-2022) Minister (since 2022)
Ismail Abdul Muttalib	House	P086 Maran	PN-PAS	17 May 2004	5	11th–15th	Deputy Minister (2013-2018, since 2020)
Ismail Sabri Yaakob	House	P090 Bera	BN–UMNO	17 May 2004	5	11th–15th	Prime Minister (2021-2022); Deputy Prime Minister (2021); Senior Minister (2020-2021) Minister (2008-2018, 2020-2022); Leader of the Opposition (2019-2020)
Wee Ka Siong	House	P148 Ayer Hitam	BN–MCA	17 May 2004	5	11th–15th	Minister (2004-2018, since 2020)
Chong Chieng Jen	House	P196 Stampin	PH–DAP	17 May 2004	5	11th–15th	Deputy Minister (2018-2020)
Lim Guan Eng	House	P043 Bagan	PH–DAP	6 October 1986	7	7th–9th, 12th-15th	Minister (2018-2020) Former MP for Kota Melaka
Abdul Hadi Awang	House	P037 Marang	PN-PAS	3 December 1990	7	8th–10th, 12th-15th	Special Envoy of the Prime Minister to Middle East (2020-2022) Leader of the Opposition (2002-2004)
Saravanan Murugan	House	P072 Tapah	BN–MIC	28 April 2008	4	12th-15th	Minister (since 2020); Deputy Minister (2008-2018)
Noraini Ahmad	House	P147 Parit Sulong	BN–UMNO	28 April 2008	4	12th-15th	Minister (since 2020); Deputy Minister (2008-2009); Chairman of PAC (2019-2020)
Hamzah Zainudin	House	P056 Larut	PN-WAWASAN	28 April 2008	4	12th-15th	Minister (2015-2018, since 2020) Deputy Minister (2008-2015)
Nancy Shukri	House	P193 Santubong	GPS–PBB	28 April 2008	4	12th-15th	Former MP for Batang Sadong Minister (2013-2018, since 2020)
Hasbi Habibollah	House	P221 Limbang	GPS–PBB	28 April 2008	4	12th-15th	Deputy Minister (since 2020)
Ahmad Maslan	House	P164 Pontian	BN–UMNO	28 April 2008	4	12th-15th	Deputy Minister (2009-2018, since 2022)
Shamsul Anuar Nasarah	House	P055 Lenggong	BN–UMNO	28 April 2008	4	12th-15th	Minister (2020-2021) Deputy Minister (since 2022)
William Leong Jee Keen	House	P097 Selayang	PH–PKR	28 April 2008	4	12th-15th	
Gobind Singh Deo	House	P106 Damansara	PH–DAP	28 April 2008	4	12th-15th	Former MP for Puchong Minister (2018-2020, since 2023)
Teo Nie Ching	House	P163 Kulai	PH–DAP	28 April 2008	4	12th-15th	Former MP for Serdang; Deputy Minister (2018-2020, since 2022)
Ngeh Koo Ham	House	P068 Beruas	PH–DAP	28 April 2008	4	12th-15th	
Nga Kor Ming	House	P076 Teluk Intan	PH–DAP	28 April 2008	4	12th-15th	Former MP for Taiping Deputy Speaker of the House (2018-2020); Minister (since 2022)
Anthony Loke Siew Fook	House	P128 Seremban	PH–DAP	28 April 2008	4	12th-15th	Minister (2018-2020, since 2022) Former MP for Rasah
Lim Lip Eng	House	P114 Kepong	PH–DAP	28 April 2008	4	12th-15th	Former MP for Segambut
Siti Zailah Mohd. Yusoff	House	P023 Rantau Panjang	PN-PAS	28 April 2008	4	12th-15th	Deputy Minister (since 2020)
Wilfred Madius Tangau	House	P170 Tuaran	PH-UPKO	20 December 1999	6	10th-12th, 13th-15th	Minister (2013-2018)
Wan Azizah Wan Ismail	House	P124 Bandar Tun Razak	PH–PKR	20 December 1999	6	10th-12th, 13th-15th	Deputy Prime Minister (2018-2020); Leader of the Opposition (2008, 2015-2018) Former MP for Permatang Pauh & Pandan
Shahidan Kassim	House	P003 Arau	PN-PAS	6 October 1986	5	7th-8th, 13th-15th	Minister (2013-2018, 2021-2022)
Mas Ermieyati Samsudin	House	P134 Masjid Tanah	PN-BERSATU	24 June 2013	3	13th-15th	Deputy Minister (2015-2018, 2020-2022)
Wilson Ugak Kumbong	House	P216 Hulu Rajang	GPS–PRS	24 June 2013	3	13th-15th	Deputy Minister (since 2022)
Rubiah Wang	House	P197 Kota Samarahan	GPS–PBB	24 June 2013	3	13th-15th	Deputy Minister (since 2022)
Abdul Rahman Mohamad	House	P079 Lipis	BN–UMNO	24 June 2013	3	13th-15th	Deputy Minister (since 2020)
Anyi Ngau	House	P220 Baram	GPS–PDP	24 June 2013	3	13th-15th	
Ikmal Hisham Abdul Aziz	House	P027 Tanah Merah	PN-BERSATU	24 June 2013	3	13th-15th	Deputy Minister (2020-2022)
Takiyuddin Hassan	House	P021 Kota Bharu	PN-PAS	24 June 2013	3	13th-15th	Minister (2020-2022)
Sivakumar Varatharaju Naidu	House	P066 Batu Gajah	PH–DAP	24 June 2013	3	13th-15th	Minister (2022-2023)
Sim Tze Tzin	House	P052 Bayan Baru	PH–PKR	24 June 2013	3	13th-15th	Deputy Minister (2018-2020)
Wan Hassan Mohd Ramli	House	P039 Dungun	PN-PAS	24 June 2013	3	13th-15th	
Alice Lau Kiong Yieng	House	P211 Lanang	PH–DAP	24 June 2013	3	13th-15th	Deputy Speaker of the House (since 2022)
Steven Sim Chee Keong	House	P045 Bukit Mertajam	PH–DAP	24 June 2013	3	13th-15th	Minister (since 2023); Deputy Minister (2018-2020, 2022-2023)
Oscar Ling Chai Yew	House	P212 Sibu	PH–DAP	24 June 2013	3	13th-15th	
Ahmad Marzuk Shaary	House	P020 Pengkalan Chepa	PN-PAS	24 June 2013	3	13th-15th	Deputy Minister (2020-2022); Former MP for Bachok
Ramkarpal Singh	House	P051 Bukit Gelugor	PH–DAP	9 June 2014	3	13th-15th	Deputy Minister (2022-2023)
Anwar Ibrahim	House	P063 Tambun	PH–PKR	29 March 1982	8	7th-10th, 12th-13th, 14th-15th	Prime Minister (2022-present) Deputy Prime Minister (1993-1998); Leader of the Opposition (2008-2015, 2020-2022) Former MP for Permatang Pauh & Port Dickson
Mohamad Sabu	House	P111 Kota Raja	PH–AMANAH	3 December 1990	5	8th–10th, 14th-15th	Minister (2018-2020, since 2022) Former MP for Nilam Puri, Kubang Kerian & Pendang
Chow Kon Yeow	House	P046 Batu Kawan	PH–DAP	20 December 1999	5	10th–12th, 14th-15th	Former MP for Tanjong
Saifuddin Abdullah	House	P082 Indera Mahkota	PN-WAWASAN	28 April 2008	3	12th, 14th-15th	Minister (2018-2022); Deputy Minister (2008-2013) Former MP for Temerloh
Dzulkefly Ahmad	House	P096 Kuala Selangor	PH–AMANAH	28 April 2008	3	12th, 14th-15th	Minister (2018-2020)
Wee Jeck Seng	House	P165 Tanjung Piai	BN-MCA	28 April 2008	3	12th, 14th-15th	Deputy Minister (2008-2010, 2020-2022)
Syed Saddiq Syed Abdul Rahman	House	P146 Muar	MUDA	16 July 2018	2	14th-15th	Minister (2018-2020)
Yeo Bee Yin	House	P103 Puchong	PH–DAP	16 July 2018	2	14th-15th	Minister (2018-2020) Former MP for Bakri
Muhammad Bakhtiar Wan Chik	House	P053 Balik Pulau	PH–PKR	16 July 2018	2	14th-15th	Deputy Minister (2018-2020)
Hannah Yeoh Tseow Suan	House	P117 Segambut	PH–DAP	16 July 2018	2	14th-15th	Deputy Minister (2018-2020) Minister (since 2022)
Isnaraissah Munirah Majilis	House	P169 Kota Belud	WARISAN	16 July 2018	2	14th-15th	Deputy Minister (2018-2020)
Wong Kah Woh	House	P060 Taiping	PH–DAP	16 July 2018	2	14th-15th	Chairman of PAC (2020-2022); Deputy Minister (since 2023) Former MP for Ipoh Timor
Kesavan Subramaniam	House	P062 Sungai Siput	PH–PKR	16 July 2018	2	14th-15th	
Chang Lih Kang	House	P077 Tanjong Malim	PH–PKR	16 July 2018	2	14th-15th	Minister (since 2022)
Ali Biju	House	P205 Saratok	PN-BERSATU	16 July 2018	2	14th-15th	Deputy Minister (2020-2022)
Kelvin Yii Lee Wuen	House	P195 Bandar Kuching	PH–DAP	16 July 2018	2	14th-15th	
Akmal Nasrullah Mohd Nasir	House	P160 Johor Bahru	PH–PKR	16 July 2018	2	14th-15th	Deputy Minister (since 2022)
Wong Shu Qi	House	P152 Kluang	PH–DAP	16 July 2018	2	14th-15th	
Cha Kee Chin	House	P130 Rasah	PH–DAP	16 July 2018	2	14th-15th	
Sanisvara Nethaji Rayer Rajaji	House	P050 Jelutong	PH–DAP	16 July 2018	2	14th-15th	
Hassan Abdul Karim	House	P159 Pasir Gudang	PH–PKR	16 July 2018	2	14th-15th	
Jonathan Yasin	House	P179 Ranau	GRS	16 July 2018	2	14th-15th	Deputy Minister (2020-2022)
Willie Mongin	House	P198 Puncak Borneo	GPS-PBB	16 July 2018	2	14th-15th	Deputy Minister (2020-2022)
Ahmad Fahmi Mohamed Fadzil	House	P121 Lembah Pantai	PH–PKR	16 July 2018	2	14th-15th	Minister (since 2022)
Pang Hok Liong	House	P142 Labis	PH–DAP	16 July 2018	2	14th-15th	
Chan Foong Hin	House	P172 Kota Kinabalu	PH–DAP	16 July 2018	2	14th-15th	Deputy Minister (since 2022)
Larry Sng Wei Shien	House	P209 Julau	PBM	16 July 2018	2	14th-15th	
Prabakaran Parameswaran	House	P115 Batu	PH–PKR	16 July 2018	2	14th-15th	
Syed Ibrahim Syed Noh	House	P144 Ledang	PH–PKR	16 July 2018	2	14th-15th	
Muslimin Yahaya	House	P092 Sungai Besar	PN–BERSATU	16 July 2018	2	14th-15th	Deputy Minister (2020-2022)
Khoo Poay Tiong	House	P138 Kota Melaka	PH–DAP	16 July 2018	2	14th-15th	
Mordi Bimol	House	P192 Mas Gading	PH–DAP	16 July 2018	2	14th-15th	
Jalaluddin Alias	House	P126 Jelebu	BN–UMNO	16 July 2018	2	14th-15th	Deputy Minister (2021-2022)
Rosol Wahid	House	P038 Hulu Terengganu	PN-BERSATU	16 July 2018	2	14th-15th	Deputy Minister (2020-2022)
Tuan Ibrahim Tuan Man	House	P024 Kubang Kerian	PN-PAS	16 July 2018	2	14th-15th	Minister (2020-2022)
Nik Muhammad Zawawi Salleh	House	P028 Pasir Puteh	PN-PAS	16 July 2018	2	14th-15th	
Ahmad Fadhli Shaari	House	P022 Pasir Mas	PN-PAS	16 July 2018	2	14th-15th	
Abdul Latiff Abdul Rahman	House	P031 Kuala Krai	PN-PAS	16 July 2018	2	14th-15th	
Hanifah Hajar Taib	House	P215 Mukah	GPS–PBB	16 July 2018	2	14th-15th	Deputy Minister (since 2020)
Sabri Azit	House	P012 Jerai	PN-PAS	16 July 2018	2	14th-15th	
Ahmad Tarmizi Sulaiman	House	P013 Sik	PN-PAS	16 July 2018	2	14th-15th	
Shaharizukirnain Abdul Kadir	House	P034 Setiu	PN-PAS	16 July 2018	2	14th-15th	
Ahmad Amzad Hashim	House	P036 Kuala Terengganu	PN-PAS	16 July 2018	2	14th-15th	Deputy Minister (2020-2022)
Jeffrey Gapari Kitingan	House	P180 Keningau	GRS–STAR	16 July 2018	2	14th-15th	Deputy Minister (2020)
Mohd. Shahar Abdullah	House	P084 Paya Besar	BN–UMNO	16 July 2018	2	14th-15th	Deputy Minister (2020-2022)
Ahmad Johnie Zawawi	House	P207 Igan	GPS–PBB	16 July 2018	2	14th-15th	
Yusuf Abd. Wahab	House	P206 Tanjong Manis	GPS–PBB	16 July 2018	2	14th-15th	
Lukanisman Awang Sauni	House	P218 Sibuti	GPS–PBB	16 July 2018	2	14th-15th	Deputy Minister (since 2022)
Arthur Joseph Kurup	House	P182 Pensiangan	BN–PBRS	16 July 2018	2	14th-15th	Deputy Minister (since 2020)
Awang Hashim	House	P011 Pendang	PN-PAS	16 July 2018	2	14th-15th	Deputy Minister (2020-2022)
Syed Abu Hussin Hafiz Syed Abdul Fasal	House	P059 Bukit Gantang	Independent	16 July 2018	2	14th-15th	
Ramli Mohd Nor	House	P078 Cameron Highlands	BN-UMNO	11 March 2019	2	14th-15th	Deputy Speaker of the House (since 2022)
Vivian Wong Shir Yee	House	P186 Sandakan	PH–DAP	1 July 2019	2	14th-15th	
Mohamad Alamin	House	P176 Kimanis	BN-UMNO	26 January 2020	2	14th-15th	Deputy Minister (2022-present)
Rita Samariah	Senate	At-large	GPS-PRS	22 June 2020	2		
Robert Lau Hui Yew	Senate	At-large	GPS-SUPP	22 June 2020	2		
Bobbey Ah Fang Suan	Senate	Sabah	GRS–GAGASAN	5 January 2021	2		
Wan Martina Wan Yusoff	Senate	Kelantan	PN-PAS	24 August 2021	2		
Shamsuddin Abdul Ghafar	Senate	Perak	BN-UMNO	20 December 2021	2		
Ahmad Ibrahim	Senate	Sarawak	GPS-PBB	22 July 2022	2		
Saifuddin Nasution Ismail	Senate	At-large	PH-PKR	3 December 2022	2		Minister (2018-2020, since 2022); Former MP for Machang & Kulim-Bandar Baharu
Zambry Abdul Kadir	Senate	At-large	BN-UMNO	3 December 2022	2		Minister (since 2022)
Mohd Naim Mokhtar	Senate	At-large	Independent	3 December 2022	2		Minister (since 2022)
Fuziah Salleh	Senate	At-large	PH-PKR	9 December 2022	1		Deputy Minister (2018-2022, since 2022); Former MP for Kuantan
Saraswathy Kandasami	Senate	At-large	PH-PKR	9 December 2022	1		Deputy Minister (since 2022)
Mohamed Khaled Nordin	House	P156 Kota Tinggi	BN-UMNO	3 December 1990	6	8th-12th, 15th	Minister (2004-2013, since 2022) Deputy Minister (1999-2004)
Suhaili Abdul Rahman	House	P166 Labuan	PN-BERSATU	20 December 1999	3	10th-11th, 15th	
Hasni Mohammad	House	P151 Simpang Renggam	BN-UMNO	17 May 2004	2	11th, 15th	Former MP for Pontian
Liew Chin Tong	House	P162 Iskandar Puteri	PH-DAP	28 April 2008	3	12th-13th, 15th	Deputy Minister (2018-2020, since 2022) Former MP for Bukit Bendera & Kluang
Che Mohamad Zulkifly Jusoh	House	P033 Besut	PN-PAS	24 June 2013	2	13th, 15th	Former MP for Setiu
Idris Ahmad	House	P058 Bagan Serai	PN-PAS	24 June 2013	2	13th, 15th	Minister (2021-2022) Former MP for Bukit Gantang
Johari Abdul Ghani	House	P119 Titiwangsa	BN-UMNO	24 June 2013	2	13th, 15th	Minister (2016-2018, since 2023) Deputy Minister (2015-2016)
Mumtaz Md. Nawi	House	P019 Tumpat	PN-PAS	19 December 2022	1	15th	
Doris Sophia Brodi	House	P202 Sri Aman	GPS-PRS	19 December 2022	1	15th	Deputy Speaker of Dewan Negara (2012-2016)
Mohd Suhaimi Abdullah	House	P004 Langkawi	PN-BERSATU	19 December 2022	1	15th	
Mohd Radzi Md Jidin	House	P125 Putrajaya	PN–BERSATU	19 December 2022	1	15th	Senior Minister (since 2020); Minister (2020-2022); Deputy Minister (2018-2020)
Lim Hui Ying	House	P049 Tanjong	PH–DAP	19 December 2022	1	15th	Deputy Minister (since 2022)
Aiman Athirah Sabu	House	P113 Sepang	PH–AMANAH	19 December 2022	1	15th	Deputy Minister (since 2022)
Wan Ahmad Fayhsal Wan Ahmad Kamal	House	P029 Machang	PN-WAWASAN	19 December 2022	1	15th	Deputy Minister (2020-2022)
Fadhlina Sidek	House	P047 Nibong Tebal	PH-PKR	19 December 2022	1	15th	Minister (since 2022)
Ahmad Yahaya	House	P008 Pokok Sena	PN-PAS	19 December 2022	1	15th	
Khairil Nizam Khirudin	House	P081 Jerantut	PN-PAS	19 December 2022	1	15th	
Iskandar Dzulkarnain Abdul Khalid	House	P067 Kuala Kangsar	Independent	19 December 2022	1	15th	
Armizan Mohd Ali	House	P175 Papar	GRS	19 December 2022	1	15th	Minister (since 2022)
Mohamad Hasan	House	P131 Rembau	BN-UMNO	19 December 2022	1	15th	Minister (since 2022)
Ewon Benedick	House	P174 Penampang	PH-UPKO	19 December 2022	1	15th	Minister (since 2022)
Zaliha Mustafa	House	P141 Sekijang	PH-PKR	19 December 2022	1	15th	Minister (since 2022)
Adly Zahari	House	P135 Alor Gajah	PH-AMANAH	19 December 2022	1	15th	Deputy Minister (since 2022)
Khairul Firdaus Akbar Khan	House	P185 Batu Sapi	GRS	19 December 2022	1	15th	Deputy Minister (since 2022)
Adam Adli Abd Halim	House	P137 Hang Tuah Jaya	PH-PKR	19 December 2022	1	15th	Deputy Minister (since 2022)
Mohammad Yusof Apdal	House	P188 Lahad Datu	WARISAN	19 December 2022	1	15th	Deputy Minister (since 2022)
Mustapha Sakmud	House	P171 Sepanggar	PH-PKR	19 December 2022	1	15th	Deputy Minister (since 2022)
Huang Tiong Sii	House	P208 Sarikei	GPS-SUPP	19 December 2022	1	15th	Deputy Minister (since 2022)
Siti Aminah Aching	House	P177 Beaufort	BN-UMNO	19 December 2022	1	15th	Deputy Minister (2022-2023)
Zahir Hassan	House	P116 Wangsa Maju	PH-PKR	19 December 2022	1	15th	
Yuneswaran Ramaraj	House	P140 Segamat	PH-PKR	19 December 2022	1	15th	
Matbali Musah	House	P178 Sipitang	GRS	19 December 2022	1	15th	
Suhaimi Nasir	House	P184 Libaran	BN-UMNO	19 December 2022	1	15th	
Shahelmey Yahya	House	P173 Putatan	BN-UMNO	19 December 2022	1	15th	
Sh Mohmed Puzi Sh Ali	House	P085 Pekan	BN-UMNO	19 December 2022	1	15th	
Aminolhuda Hassan	House	P149 Sri Gading	PH-AMANAH	19 December 2022	1	15th	
Manndzri Nasib	House	P155 Tenggara	BN-UMNO	19 December 2022	1	15th	
Tan Kar Hing	House	P071 Gopeng	PH-PKR	19 December 2022	1	15th	
Chow Yu Hui	House	P080 Raub	PH-DAP	19 December 2022	1	15th	
Tan Hong Pin	House	P145 Bakri	PH-DAP	19 December 2022	1	15th	
Andi Muhammad Suryandy Bandy	House	P191 Kalabakan	BN-UMNO	19 December 2022	1	15th	
Ramanan Ramakrishnan	House	P107 Sungai Buloh	PH-PKR	19 December 2022	1	15th	
Ganabatirau Veraman	House	P110 Klang	PH-DAP	19 December 2022	1	15th	
Syahredzan Johan	House	P102 Bangi	PH-DAP	19 December 2022	1	15th	
Rodziah Ismail	House	P099 Ampang	PH-PKR	19 December 2022	1	15th	
Mohd Sany Hamzan	House	P101 Hulu Langat	PH-AMANAH	19 December 2022	1	15th	
Azli Yusof	House	P108 Shah Alam	PH-AMANAH	19 December 2022	1	15th	
Jimmy Puah Wee Tse	House	P158 Tebrau	PH-PKR	19 December 2022	1	15th	
Onn Abu Bakar	House	P150 Batu Pahat	PH-PKR	19 December 2022	1	15th	
Mohd Isam Mohd Isa	House	P133 Tampin	BN-UMNO	19 December 2022	1	15th	
Adnan Abu Hassan	House	P129 Kuala Pilah	BN-UMNO	19 December 2022	1	15th	
Shamshulkahar Mohd. Deli	House	P127 Jempol	BN-UMNO	19 December 2022	1	15th	
Edwin Banta	House	P214 Selangau	GPS-PRS	19 December 2022	1	15th	
Richard Rapu	House	P204 Betong	GPS-PBB	19 December 2022	1	15th	
Young Syefura Othman	House	P089 Bentong	PH-DAP	19 December 2022	1	15th	
Syerleena Abdul Rashid	House	P048 Bukit Bendera	PH-DAP	19 December 2022	1	15th	
Lo Su Fui	House	P190 Tawau	GRS-PBS	19 December 2022	1	15th	
Roy Angau Gingkoi	House	P203 Lubok Antu	GPS-PRS	19 December 2022	1	15th	
Mohamad Shafizan Kepli	House	P201 Batang Lupar	GPS-PBB	19 December 2022	1	15th	
Chong Zhemin	House	P070 Kampar	PH-DAP	19 December 2022	1	15th	
Howard Lee Chuan How	House	P064 Ipoh Timor	PH-DAP	19 December 2022	1	15th	
Mohammed Taufiq Johari	House	P015 Sungai Petani	PH-PKR	19 December 2022	1	15th	
Riduan Rubin	House	P181 Tenom	KDM	19 December 2022	1	15th	
Verdon Bahanda	House	P167 Kudat	Independent	19 December 2022	1	15th	
Rodiyah Sapiee	House	P200 Batang Sadong	GPS-PBB	19 December 2022	1	15th	
Amirudin Shari	House	P098 Gombak	PH-PKR	19 December 2022	1	15th	
Aminuddin Harun	House	P132 Port Dickson	PH-PKR	19 December 2022	1	15th	
Chiew Choon Man	House	P219 Miri	PH-PKR	19 December 2022	1	15th	
Wetrom Bahanda	House	P168 Kota Marudu	KDM	19 December 2022	1	15th	
Mohd Syahir Che Sulaiman	House	P025 Bachok	PN-PAS	19 December 2022	1	15th	
Afnan Hamimi Taib Azamudden	House	P009 Alor Setar	PN-PAS	19 December 2022	1	15th	
Ku Abdul Rahman Ku Ismail	House	P006 Kubang Pasu	PN-BERSATU	19 December 2022	1	15th	
Zahari Kechik	House	P030 Jeli	Independent	19 December 2022	1	15th	
Azman Nasrudin	House	P017 Padang Serai	PN-BERSATU	19 December 2022	1	15th	
Mohd Hasnizan Harun	House	P094 Hulu Selangor	PN-PAS	19 December 2022	1	15th	
Muhammad Islahuddin Abas	House	P154 Mersing	PN-BERSATU	19 December 2022	1	15th	
Hassan Saad	House	P016 Baling	PN-PAS	19 December 2022	1	15th	
Wan Saiful Wan Jan	House	P042 Tasek Gelugor	PN-WAWASAN	19 December 2022	1	15th	
Khlir Mohd Nor	House	P026 Ketereh	PN-BERSATU	19 December 2022	1	15th	
Mohd Misbahul Munir Masduki	House	P057 Parit Buntar	PN-PAS	19 December 2022	1	15th	
Ahmad Yunus Hairi	House	P112 Kuala Langat	PN-PAS	19 December 2022	1	15th	
Zulkifli Ismail	House	P139 Jasin	PN-PAS	19 December 2022	1	15th	
Alias Razak	House	P035 Kuala Nerus	PN-PAS	19 December 2022	1	15th	
Ahmad Fakhruddin Fakhrurazi	House	P010 Kuala Kedah	PN-PAS	19 December 2022	1	15th	
Zulkafperi Hanapi	House	P095 Tanjong Karang	Independent	19 December 2022	1	15th	
Nurul Amin Hamid	House	P007 Padang Terap	PN-PAS	19 December 2022	1	15th	
Roslan Hashim	House	P018 Kulim-Bandar Baharu	PN-BERSATU	19 December 2022	1	15th	
Halimah Ali	House	P109 Kapar	PN-PAS	19 December 2022	1	15th	
Kamal Ashaari	House	P087 Kuala Krau	PN-PAS	19 December 2022	1	15th	
Bakri Jamaluddin	House	P136 Tangga Batu	PN-PAS	19 December 2022	1	15th	
Mohd Nazri Abu Hassan	House	P014 Merbok	PN-BERSATU	19 December 2022	1	15th	
Muhammad Fawwaz Mohamad Jan	House	P044 Permatang Pauh	PN-PAS	19 December 2022	1	15th	
Siti Mastura Mohamad	House	P041 Kepala Batas	PN-PAS	19 December 2022	1	15th	
Azahari Hasan	House	P061 Padang Rengas	PN-WAWASAN	19 December 2022	1	15th	
Abdul Ghani Ahmad	House	P005 Jerlun	PN-PAS	19 December 2022	1	15th	
Abdul Khalib Abdullah	House	P091 Rompin	PN-BERSATU	19 December 2022	1	15th	
Zakri Hassan	House	P002 Kangar	PN-BERSATU	19 December 2022	1	15th	
Rushdan Rusmi	House	P001 Padang Besar	PN-PAS	19 December 2022	1	15th	
Mohd Azizi Abu Naim	House	P032 Gua Musang	Independent	19 December 2022	1	15th	
Salamiah Mohd Nor	House	P088 Temerloh	PN-PAS	19 December 2022	1	15th	
Nordin Ahmad Ismail	House	P074 Lumut	PN-BERSATU	19 December 2022	1	15th	
Muhammad Ismi Mat Taib	House	P069 Parit	PN-PAS	19 December 2022	1	15th	
Kalam Salan	House	P092 Sabak Bernam	PN-BERSATU	19 December 2022	1	15th	
Wan Razali Wan Nor	House	P083 Kuantan	PN-PAS	19 December 2022	1	15th	
Jamaluddin Yahya	House	P073 Pasir Salak	PN-PAS	19 December 2022	1	15th	
Fathul Huzir Ayob	House	P054 Gerik	PN-WAWASAN	19 December 2022	1	15th	
Lingeshwaran R. Arunasalam	Senate	Penang	PH-DAP	7 March 2023	2		
Hussin Ismail	Senate	Terengganu	PN-PAS	15 March 2023	2		
Abun Sui Anyit	Senate	At-large	PH-PKR	20 March 2023	2		
Awang Sariyan	Senate	At-large	Independent	20 March 2023	2		
Isaiah Jacob	Senate	Kuala Lumpur	PH-PKR	20 March 2023	2		
Low Kian Chuan	Senate	At-large	Independent	20 March 2023	2		
Mohd Hasbie Muda	Senate	At-large	PH-AMANAH	20 March 2023	2		
Manolan Mohamad	Senate	Aboriginese	PH-PKR	20 March 2023	2		
Mohd Hatta Ramli	Senate	At-large	PH-AMANAH	20 March 2023	2		Deputy Minister (2018-2020) Former MP for Kuala Krai & Lumut
Abd Nasir Idris	Senate	Kedah	PN-PAS	20 March 2023	2		
Musoddak Ahmad	Senate	Kedah	PN-PAS	20 March 2023	2		
Nur Jazlan Mohamed	Senate	At-large	BN-UMNO	15 June 2023	2		Deputy Minister (2015-2018); Former MP for Pulai
Suhaizan Kayat	House	P161 Pulai	PH-AMANAH	19 September 2023	1		
Nik Mohamed Abduh Nik Abdul Aziz	Senate	Kelantan	PN-PAS	19 September 2023	2		Former MP for Pasir Mas and Bachok
Ahmad Samsuri Mokhtar	House	P040 Kemaman	PN-PAS	8 December 2023	1		
Abdul Halim Suleiman	Senate	Johor	BN-UMNO	4 December 2023	1		MLA for Tiram
Michael Mujah Lihan	Senate	Sarawak	GPS-PBB	11 December 2023	2		
Amir Hamzah Azizan	Senate	At-large	Independent	12 December 2023	1		Minister (since 2023)
Zulkifli Hasan	Senate	At-large	Independent	12 December 2023	1		Deputy Minister (since 2023)
Anna Bell Suziena Perian	Senate	At-large	GRS-GAGASAN	5 March 2024	1		
Pele Peter Tinggom	Senate	At-large	GPS-PDP	5 March 2024	1		
Nelson Wences Angang	Senate	At-large	PH-UPKO	9 May 2024	1		
Salehuddin Saidin	Senate	At-large	Independent	22 July 2024	1		
Azahar Hassan	Senate	Perlis	PN-PAS	10 September 2024	1		
Baharuddin Ahmad	Senate	Perlis	PN-BERSATU	10 September 2024	1		
Che Alias Hamid	Senate	Terengganu	PN-PAS	21 November 2024	1		Former MP for Kemaman
Edward Linggu Bukut	Senate	Sabah	STAR	9 December 2024	1		
Tiew Way Keng	Senate	Selangor	PH-DAP	26 February 2025	1		
Mohammad Redzuan Othman	Senate	Selangor	PH-PKR	26 February 2025	1		
Norhashimi Abdul Ghani	Senate	Pahang	BN-UMNO	24 April 2025	1		
Shahrol Wizan Sulong	Senate	Pahang	BN-UMNO	24 April 2025	1		
Vincent Wu Him Ven	Senate	Negeri Sembilan	PH-DAP	25 August 2025	1		
Julfitri Joha	Senate	Negeri Sembilan	PH-PKR	25 August 2025	1		
Leong Ngah Ngah	Senate	At-large	PH-DAP	25 August 2025	1		
Ng Keng Heng	Senate	Johor	BN-MCA	11 September 2025	1		
Nira Tan Kran	Senate	At-large	PH-PKR	24 September 2025	1		
Larry Asap	Senate	At-large	PH-DAP	10 May 2026	1		
Phoong Jin Zhe	Senate	At-large	PH-DAP	10 May 2026	1		
Sheikh Umar Bagharib Ali	Senate	At-large	PH-DAP	10 May 2026	1		
Thiagarajah Rajagopal	Senate	At-large	PH-DAP	10 May 2026	1		
Wong You Fong	Senate	At-large	BN-MCA	10 May 2026	1		
Mohamad Zaini Salleh	Senate	At-large	BN-UMNO	10 May 2026	1		
Noor Inayah Ya'akub	Senate	Penang	PH-PKR	14 May 2026	1		
Mohamad Hairul Amir Sabri	Senate	Perak	PH-PKR	10 September 2026	1		

== See also ==
- Malaysian order of precedence
