= National Department for Culture and Arts =

- Jabatan Kebudayaan dan Kesenian Negara جابتن كبودايان دان كسنين نڬارا
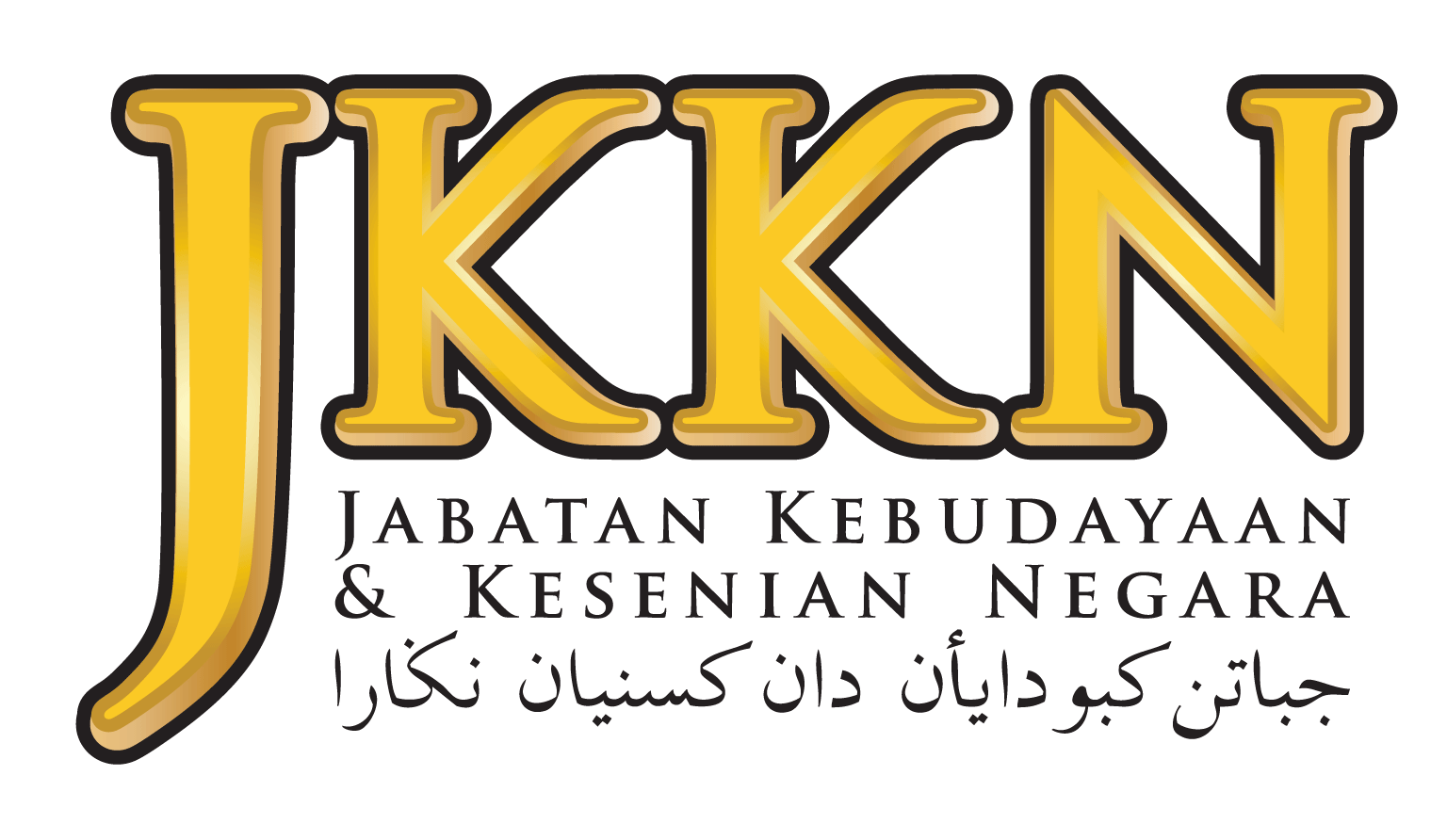
- Logo

Jabatan Kebudayaan dan Kesenian Negara overview
- Formed: 22 March 2005
- Preceding Jabatan Kebudayaan dan Kesenian Negara: Cultural Section
- Headquarters: Aras 34, Lot 1001, Menara TH Perdana, Jalan Sultan Ismail, Kuala Lumpur, Malaysia
- Motto: Semarakkan Seni Budaya (Ignite Culture and Arts)
- Minister responsible: Tiong King Sing, Minister of Tourism, Arts and Culture
- Deputy Minister responsible: Khairul Firdaus Akhbar Khan, Deputy Minister of Tourism, Arts and Culture
- Parent department: Ministry of Tourism, Arts and Culture
- Child Jabatan Kebudayaan dan Kesenian Negara: Several
- Website: www.jkkn.gov.my

National Department for Culture and Arts (Malay: Jabatan Kebudayaan dan Kesenian Negara, JKKN) is one of the agencies under Ministry of Tourism and Culture, Malaysia and it is responsible in implementing cultural and arts activities in Malaysia.

== History ==
1953 Formation of Cultural Division under the Ministry of Social Welfare

1964 Cultural Division placed under the Ministry of Information

1972 Cultural Division at the Ministry of Culture, Youth and Sports

1987 Cultural Division at the Ministry of Tourism and Culture

1992 Cultural Division at the Ministry of Culture, Arts and Tourism

2004 Cultural Division at the Ministry of Culture, Arts and Heritage (KEKKWA)

22 Mar 2005 Upgraded to JKKN (Warrant Number S20 Year 2005)

1 Feb 2007 Creation of a new division which is planning, research and development division (Warrant Number S40 Year 2007)

18 Mac 2008 JKKN as one of the agencies under the Ministry of Unity, Culture, Arts and Heritage (KPKKW)

April 2009 JKKN under the patronage of the Ministry of Information, Communication and Culture (KPKK).

16 May 2013, Since then, JKKN becomes an agency under the Ministry of Tourism and Culture.

On 2 July 2018, this Ministry was renamed as the Ministry of Tourism, Arts and Culture Malaysia as announced by YAB Prime Minister during the Cabinet Formation after the 14th General Election.

== Vision ==
Cultural Art lead body in supporting Arts for Arts, Arts for Unity, and Cultural Arts in Revenue Generation for industry players towards the formation of national identity and prosperity.

== Mission ==
1) Strengthening efforts to preserve, maintain, expand and popularize the National cultural arts heritage;

2) Potentiating cultural arts elements to enhance the National Identity, prosperity and unity;

3) Encouraging innovative cultural arts to increase industry player's income;

4) Contributing to the growth of cultural tourism activities.

== Top Management ==
Director General : YBrs Tuan Haji Mesran Bin Mohd Yusop

Vice Director General (Plan & Policy) : YBrs Encik Salehhuddin b. Md Salleh

Vice Director General (Art& Culture) : YBrs Encik Mohd Amran bin Mohd Haris

== Divisions ==
Administrative Division

Finance Division

Services and Training Division

Corporate Communication Division

Arts Development Division

Culture Development Division

Cultural Arts Guidance Division

Cultural Arts Enhancement Division

Documentation and Publication Division

Planning and Coordination Division

Production and Artistic Development Division

Research and Development Division

Cultural Arts Product Development Division

== State Offices ==
There are 14 state JKKN offices, which implement arts and cultural activities on state level. They are:-

National Department For Culture And Arts, Perlis

National Department For Culture And Arts, Kedah

National Department For Culture And Arts, Penang

National Department For Culture And Arts, Perak

National Department For Culture And Arts, Selangor

National Department For Culture And Arts, Kuala Lumpur

National Department For Culture And Arts, Negeri Sembilan

National Department For Culture And Arts, Malacca

National Department For Culture And Arts, Johor

National Department For Culture And Arts, Pahang

National Department For Culture And Arts, Terengganu

National Department For Culture And Arts, Kelantan

National Department For Culture And Arts, Sarawak

National Department For Culture And Arts, Sabah

== Efforts ==
In February 2013, the National Department for Culture and Arts (JKKN) and National Academy of Arts, Culture and Heritage (Aswara) have been instructed to set up a school of etiquette to imbue noble values and build good character in members of society.

Also on February, JKKN's Director General, Dato' Norliza Rofli announced grants under the National Creative Industry Policy worth RM 4 million are up for grabs for the development of the arts scene.

On May 11, 2013, during Karnival Seni Kreatif Kita, Norliza announced that in 2008, the creative industry contributed to 1.27 per cent of the gross national income, which was equivalent to RM 9.4 billion, and the carnival was one of the Entry Point Projects in the Economic Transformation Programme (ETP) under the National Key Economic Areas (NKEAs) for Communications Content and Infrastructure.

== Branch of JKKN Offices ==
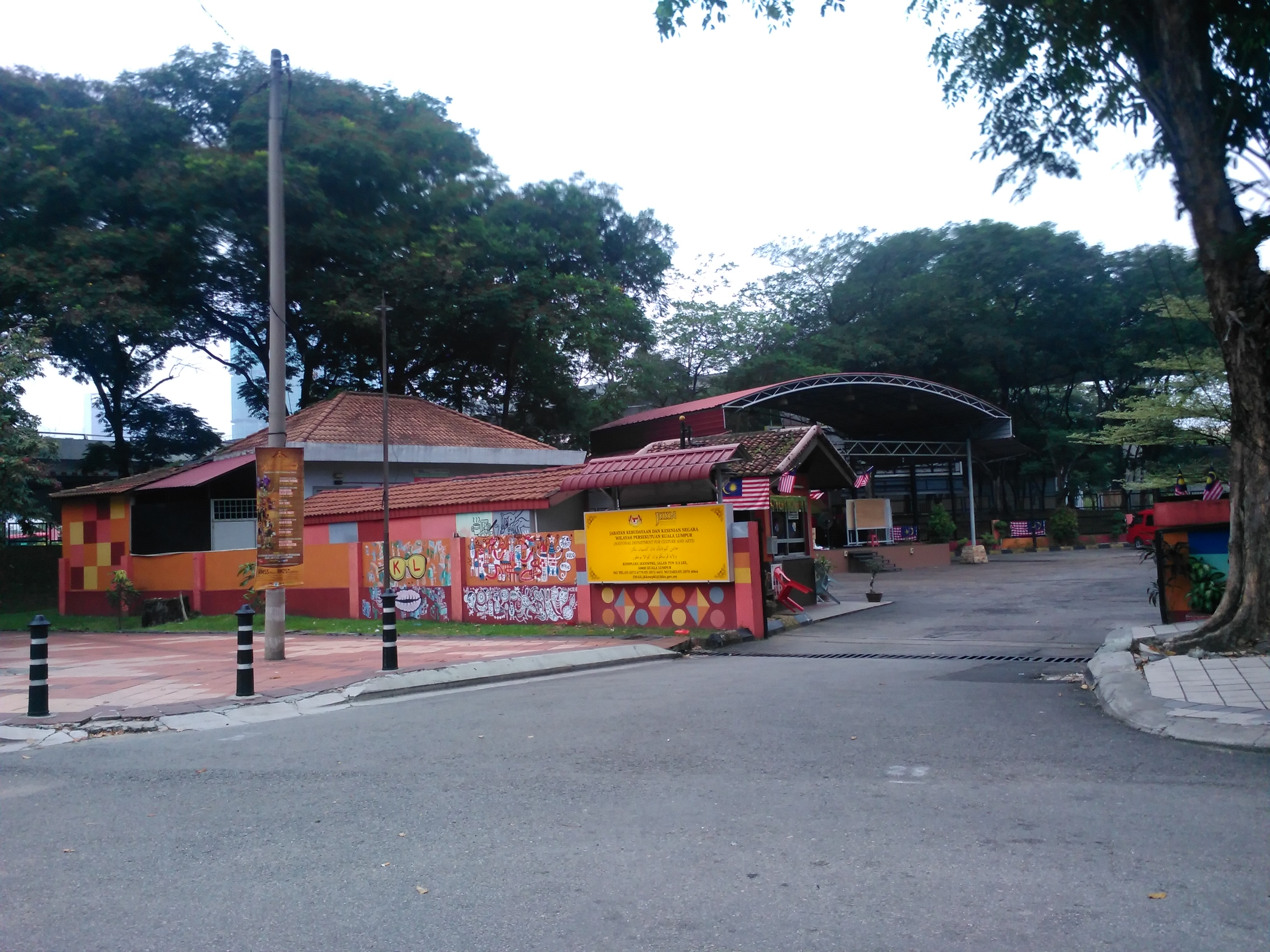
Kuala Lumpur State office, Kompleks JKKNWPKL

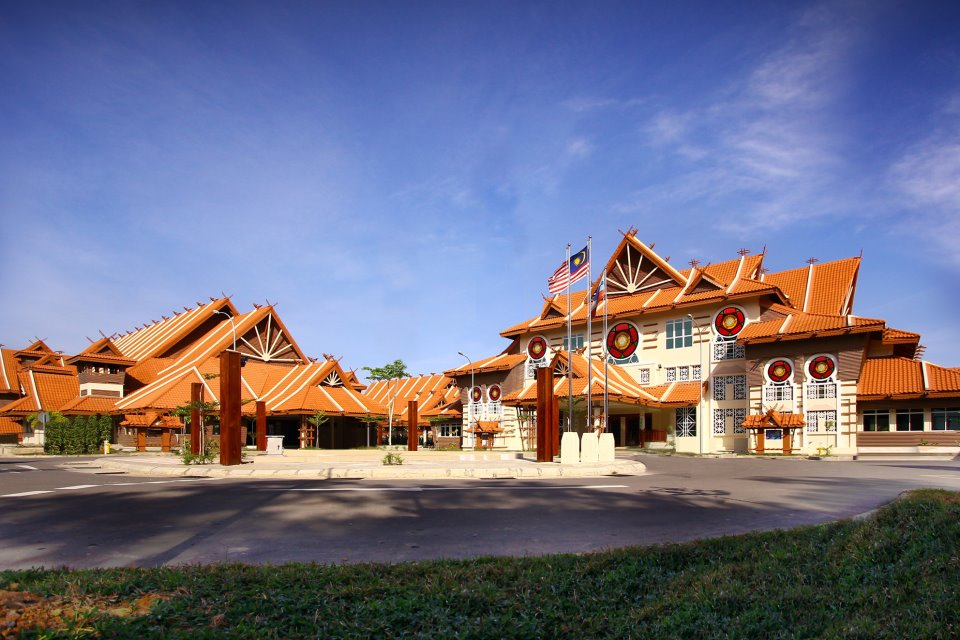
JKKN Branch Offices in Sabah
