= Tan Kok Wai =

Malaysian politician

Yang Berhormat Tuan Tan Kok Wai MP
- 陈国伟
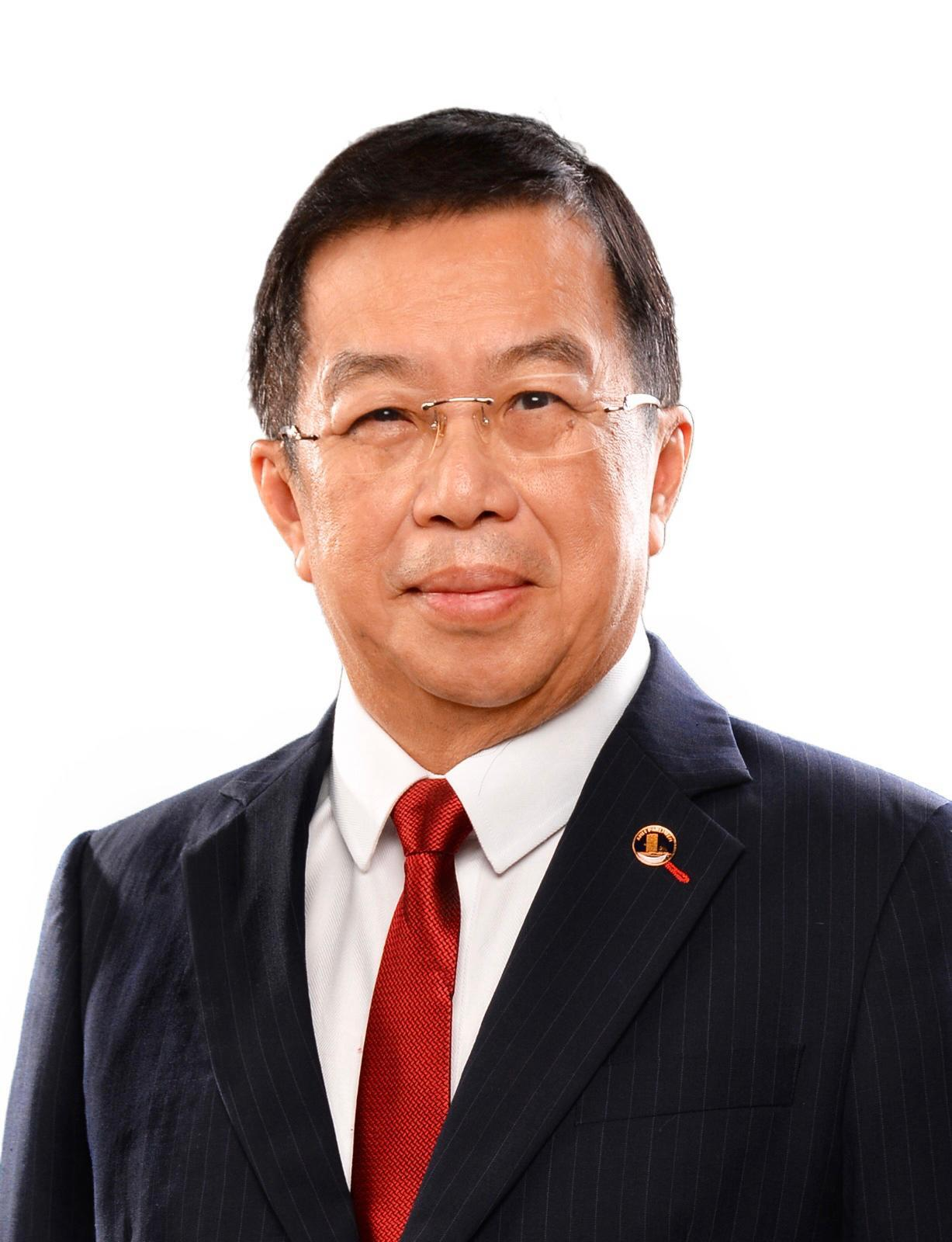

Special Envoy of the Prime Minister to China
- In office 1 August 2018 – 1 March 2020
- Monarchs: Muhammad V (2018–2019); Abdullah (2019–2020)
- Prime Minister: Mahathir Mohamad
- Preceded by: Ong Ka Ting
- Succeeded by: Tiong King Sing

Member of the Malaysian Parliament for Cheras
- Incumbent
- Assumed office 25 April 1995
- Preceded by: Position established
- Majority: 14,375 (1995); 8,992 (1999); 10,970 (2004); 28,300 (2008); 37,409 (2013); 49,665 (2018); 54,448 (2022)

Member of the Malaysian Parliament for Sungai Besi
- In office 3 August 1986 – 25 April 1995
- Preceded by: Chan Kok Kit (DAP)
- Succeeded by: Position abolished
- Majority: 1,526 (1986); 8,856 (1990)

Advisor II of the Democratic Action Party
- Incumbent
- Assumed office 23 June 2025 Serving with Lim Guan Eng (Advisor I)
- National Chairman: Gobind Singh Deo
- Secretary-General: Anthony Loke Siew Fook
- In office 20 March 2022 – 16 March 2025 (as Advisor)
- National Chairman: Lim Guan Eng
- Secretary-General: Anthony Loke Siew Fook
- Preceded by: Position established
- Succeeded by: Lim Guan Eng

4th National Chairman of the Democratic Action Party
- In office 29 March 2014 – 20 March 2022
- Deputy: Gobind Singh Deo
- Secretary-General: Lim Guan Eng
- Preceded by: Karpal Singh
- Succeeded by: Lim Guan Eng

1st Chairman of Pakatan Harapan of the Federal Territories
- Incumbent
- Assumed office 30 August 2017
- National Chairman: Mahathir Mohamad (2017–2020); Anwar Ibrahim (since 2020)
- Preceded by: Position established

Personal details
- Born: Tan Kok Wai; 7 October 1957 (age 68) Sepang, Selangor, Federation of Malaya (now Malaysia)
- Party: Democratic Action Party (DAP) (since 1979)
- Other political affiliations: Gagasan Rakyat (GR) (1990–1995); Barisan Alternatif (BA) (1999–2004); Pakatan Rakyat (PR) (2008–2015); Pakatan Harapan (PH) (since 2015)
- Children: 1 daughter; 1 son
- Occupation: Politician
- Website: tankokwai.blogspot.com

Chinese name
- Traditional Chinese: 陳國偉
- Simplified Chinese: 陈国伟
- Hanyu Pinyin: Chén Guówěi
- Hokkien POJ: Tân Kok-uí

Tan Kok Wai (simplified Chinese: 陈国伟; traditional Chinese: 陳國偉; pinyin: Chén Guówěi; Pe̍h-ōe-jī: Tân Kok-uí) (born 7 October 1957) is a Malaysian politician who has served as the Member of Parliament (MP) for Cheras since April 1995. He served as the Special Envoy of Prime Minister Mahathir Mohamad to China from August 2018 to March 2020 as well as the MP for Sungai Besi from August 1986 to April 1995. He is a member of the Democratic Action Party (DAP), a component party of the Pakatan Harapan (PH) coalition, and served as its 1st Advisor from March 2020 to March 2025, and previously as its 4th National Chairman from March 2014 to March 2022. He also serves as the 1st Chairman of the Federal Territories Pakatan Harapan. Currently serving his 9th term as an MP, he is the most senior MP in the 15th Malaysian Parliament and the longest-serving active MP after Tengku Razaleigh Hamzah lost the reelection in 2022.

== Political career ==
Tan Kok Wai became a member of the Democratic Action Party in 1979.

In 1986, he contested in the general election for Sungai Besi parliamentary contest in the general election for Sungai Besi parliamentary constituency in Kuala Lumpur. He was elected as a member of parliament for the first time.

In 1990, he was re-elected for the same constituency in the general election.

In the 6 following general elections in 1995, 1999, 2004, 2008, 2013 and 2018, Tan Kok Wai was elected as the Member of Parliament for Cheras constituency in Kuala Lumpur.

Tan has served as DAP's Advisor (2022–2025), National Chairman (2014–2022), Acting National Chairman, National Deputy Chairman, National Vice Chairman, Chairman of the Election Preparation Committee, Member of General Election / State Elections Candidate Selection Committee in 2008, 2013 and 2018, Chairman of the Disciplinary Committee, National Organising Secretary, and National Publicity Secretary, Assistant National Organising Secretary, and Assistant National Publicity Secretary.

He was appointed Special Envoy of Malaysia to the People's Republic of China as well as the Chairman of Malaysia-China Business Council from August 2018 to March 2020.

In terms of social service, he is currently acting as honorary advisors to numerous NGOs in Federal Territory Kuala Lumpur and Selangor.

== Election results ==
Selangor State Legislative Assembly
Year	Constituency	Candidate	Votes	Pct	Opponent(s)	Votes	Pct	Ballots cast	Majority	Turnout
1982	N32 Sungai Pelek	Tan Kok Wai (DAP)	2,158	23.67%	Ng Soon Por (MCA)	6,528	71.61%	9,262	4,370	80.80%
1982	N32 Sungai Pelek	Tan Kok Wai (DAP)	2,158	23.67%	Daud Jantan (PAS)	430	4.72%	9,262	4,370	80.80%

Parliament of Malaysia
Year	Constituency	Candidate	Votes	Pct	Opponent(s)	Votes	Pct	Ballots cast	Majority	Turnout
1986	P102 Sungai Besi	Tan Kok Wai (DAP)	22,188	49.12%	Kee Yong Wee (MCA)	20,662	45.74%	45,408	1,526	70.01%
1986	P102 Sungai Besi	Tan Kok Wai (DAP)	22,188	49.12%	Shariffuddin Budin (PAS)	2,320	5.14%	45,408	1,526	70.01%
1990	P102 Sungai Besi	Tan Kok Wai (DAP)	32,169	56.56%	Tan Chai Ho (MCA)	23,313	40.99%	57,303	8,856	70.87%
1990	P102 Sungai Besi	Tan Kok Wai (DAP)	32,169	56.56%	Abdul Hamid Selamat (IND)	1,389	2.44%	57,303	8,856	70.87%
1995	P111 Cheras	Tan Kok Wai (DAP)	29,240	66.30%	Mook Soon Man (MCA)	14,865	33.70%	44,329	14,375	69.38%
1999	P111 Cheras	Tan Kok Wai (DAP)	27,579	59.63%	Lee Boon Kok (MCA)	18,587	40.19%	46,465	8,992	70.63%
2004	P123 Cheras	Tan Kok Wai (DAP)	26,940	62.70%	Lee Boon Kok (MCA)	15,970	37.17%	43,200	10,970	63.72%
2008	P123 Cheras	Tan Kok Wai (DAP)	39,253	78.00%	Jeffrey Goh Sim Ik (MCA)	10,953	21.76%	50,571	28,300	74.58%
2013	P123 Cheras	Tan Kok Wai (DAP)	48,249	81.53%	Teoh Chee Hooi (MCA)	10,840	18.32%	59,492	37,409	82.00%
2018	P123 Cheras	Tan Kok Wai (DAP)	56,671	89.00%	Heng Sinn Yee (MCA)	7,006	11.00%	64,074	49,665	81.29%
2022	P123 Cheras	Tan Kok Wai (DAP)	60,294	84.04%	Chin Yoke Kheng (BERSATU)	5,846	8.15%	72,207	54,448	71.15%
2022	P123 Cheras	Tan Kok Wai (DAP)	60,294	84.04%	Chong Yew Chuan (MCA)	5,606	7.81%	72,207	54,448	71.15%

== Honours ==
=== Honours of Malaysia ===
- Malaysia
  - Recipient of the 17th Yang di-Pertuan Agong Installation Medal (2025)

== See also ==
- List of longest-serving members of the Parliament of Malaysia

Political offices
Preceded by Ong Ka Ting	Special Envoy of the Prime Minister of Malaysia to the People's Republic of China; 1 August 2018–1 March 2020	Succeeded by Tiong King Sing
Parliament of Malaysia
New creation	Member of Parliament for Cheras; 25 April 1995–present	Incumbent
Preceded by Chan Kok Kit	Member of Parliament for Sungai Besi; 3 August 1986–25 April 1995	Constituency abolished
Party political offices
Preceded by Karpal Singh	National Chairman of the Democratic Action Party; 29 March 2014–present	Incumbent
