= Barisan Nasional Backbenchers Club and Parliamentary Council =

== Barisan Nasional Backbenchers Club ==
Barisan Nasional Backbenchers Club (Malay: Kelab Ahli Penyokong Barisan Nasional; abbrev: BNBBC) is composed of the BN backbencher MPs. The term "backbencher" originates from the British Parliament, denoting an MP who is not a member of the Cabinet or is otherwise part of the government as a Deputy Minister or Parliamentary Secretary. Since the 2022 general election, there have been 30 BN MPs. Six among them have been appointed as members of the Anwar Ibrahim cabinet. Therefore, there are presently 24 BN backbencher MPs. Initially it was not prominent in parliamentary affairs. However, in 2005, it drew attention when its then Chairman Shahrir Abdul Samad publicly called for the restoration of the Parliamentary Services Act (PSA) so that the Parliament could be self-sufficient in conducting its own affairs. The then backbencher MPs supported Shahrir, but little was heard further on after the matter blew over. Then in 2006, Shahrir resigned from his position after not receiving support from the backbenchers in voting for a motion brought by then Leader of the Opposition and MP for Ipoh Timor Lim Kit Siang from the Democratic Action Party (DAP). Then Deputy Chairman Raja Ahmad Zainuddin Raja Omar was appointed to replace Shahrir as the Acting Chair. After 2008 general election, Bintulu MP Tiong King Sing of the Sarawak Progressive Democratic Party (SPDP) took over Raja Ahmad Zainuddin as Chairman while Kinabatangan MP Bung Moktar Radin took over as Deputy Chairman. After the 2013 general election, Shahrir was reappointed Chairman for a second term replacing Tiong and Bung Moktar remained the Deputy Chairman. After the 2018 Malaysian general election, the positions of Chairman and Deputy Chairman were vacant for two years. It was most recently chaired by former Prime Minister and former Pekan MP Najib Razak from November 2020 to his disqualification from the position after losing his parliamentary seat upon his admission to the prison in August 2022.

== Barisan Nasional Parliamentary Council ==
Barisan Nasional Parliamentary Council (Malay: Majlis Ahli Parlimen Barisan Nasional; abbrev: BNPC) is composed of Barisan Nasional (BN) Members of Parliament (MPs) responsible for holding the government to account and for developing and disseminating the policy positions of the coalition. It was most recently chaired by Bera MP Ismail Sabri Yaakob from July 2018 to his ministerial appointment in March 2020.

== List of Chairmen and Deputy Chairmen of BNBBC & BNPC ==
Chairman of BNBBC

No	Names	Constituency	Term start	Term end
1.	Shahrir Abdul Samad	Johor Bahru	2004	2006
2.	Raja Ahmad Zainuddin Raja Omar	Larut	2006	2008
3.	Tiong King Sing	Bintulu	2008	2013
4.	Shahrir Abdul Samad	Johor Bahru	2013	2018
5.	Najib Razak	Pekan	1 November 2020	23 August 2022
6.	Johari Abdul Ghani	Titiwangsa	2022	2023
7.	Mohd Shahar Abdullah	Paya Besar	2024	Incumbent

Deputy Chairmen of BNBBC

No	Names	Constituency	Term start	Term end
1.	Raja Ahmad Zainuddin Raja Omar	Larut	2004	2006
2.	Bung Moktar Radin	Kinabatangan	2008	2018

Chairman of BNPC

No.	Names	Constituency	Term start	Term end
1.	Ismail Sabri Yaakob	Bera	26 July 2018	10 March 2020

== List of Members of Parliament ==
=== Members of Parliament of the 15th Malaysian Parliament ===
Barisan Nasional has 30 MPs in the Dewan Rakyat, with 26 from UMNO, 2 from MCA, 1 from MIC and 1 from PBRS.

State	No.	Parliament Constituency	Member	Party
Perak	P055	Lenggong	Shamsul Anuar Nasarah	UMNO
Perak	P072	Tapah	Saravanan Murugan	MIC
Perak	P075	Bagan Datuk	Ahmad Zahid Hamidi	UMNO
Pahang	P078	Cameron Highlands	Ramli Mohd Nor	UMNO
Pahang	P079	Lipis	Abdul Rahman Mohamad	UMNO
Pahang	P084	Paya Besar	Mohd Shahar Abdullah	UMNO
Pahang	P085	Pekan	Sh Mohmed Puzi Sh Ali	UMNO
Pahang	P090	Bera	Ismail Sabri Yaakob	UMNO
Kuala Lumpur	P119	Titiwangsa	Johari Abdul Ghani	UMNO
Negeri Sembilan	P126	Jelebu	Jalaluddin Alias	UMNO
Negeri Sembilan	P127	Jempol	Shamshulkahar Mohd Deli	UMNO
Negeri Sembilan	P129	Kuala Pilah	Adnan Abu Hassan	UMNO
Negeri Sembilan	P131	Rembau	Mohamad Hassan	UMNO
Negeri Sembilan	P133	Tampin	Mohd Isam Mohd Isa	UMNO
Johor	P147	Parit Sulong	Noraini Ahmad	UMNO
Johor	P148	Ayer Hitam	Wee Ka Siong	MCA
Johor	P151	Simpang Renggam	Hasni Mohammad	UMNO
Johor	P153	Sembrong	Hishammuddin Hussein	UMNO
Johor	P155	Tenggara	Manndzri Nasib	UMNO
Johor	P156	Kota Tinggi	Mohamed Khaled Nordin	UMNO
Johor	P157	Pengerang	Azalina Othman Said	UMNO
Johor	P164	Pontian	Ahmad Maslan	UMNO
Johor	P165	Tanjung Piai	Wee Jeck Seng	MCA
Sabah	P173	Putatan	Shahelmey Yahya	UMNO
Sabah	P176	Kimanis	Mohamad Alamin	UMNO
Sabah	P177	Beaufort	Siti Aminah Aching	UMNO
Sabah	P182	Pensiangan	Arthur Joseph Kurup	PBRS
Sabah	P184	Libaran	Suhaimi Nasir	UMNO
Sabah	P187	Kinabatangan	Bung Moktar Radin	UMNO
Sabah	P191	Kalabakan	Andi Muhammad Suryady Bandy	UMNO
Total	Perak (3), Pahang (5), Kuala Lumpur (1), Negeri Sembilan (5), Johor (9), Sabah (7)			

== See also ==
- Shadow Cabinet of Malaysia
