= SMK Taman Connaught =

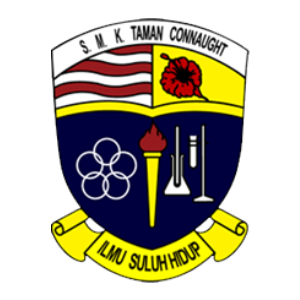
- Jalan Ahliman, Taman Connaught, 56000 Kuala Lumpur, Malaysia

Information
- Type: Secondary school
- Motto: Ilmu Suluh Hidup (Knowledge is the Torch of Life)
- Established: 4 December 1989
- School district: Taman Connaught
- Colours: Red, Blue, Yellow and White
- Nickname: Connaughtians
- Website: smktcasc.edupage.org

Sekolah Menengah Kebangsaan Taman Connaught (abbreviation: SMK Taman Connaught or SMKTC) is a Malaysian national secondary school in Kuala Lumpur, Malaysia. Currently, it has about 2,500 students and 100 teachers operating in two shifts, a morning session for Form 3, 4 and 5 students aged 15 to 18 years old, and an afternoon session for Remove, Form 1 and 2 students aged 13 to 15 years old.

== History ==
When it was proposed that a new secondary school be built in Cheras in July 1987, Taman Connaught was identified as an ideal place to build the school. Under a RM2.5 million World Bank loan, construction began on 4 December 1989. Construction was completed on 27 November 1991.

During the construction period, the first cohort of Connaughtians consisting of thirteen teachers and 197 students started the first school session on 4 December 1989. Students and teachers temporarily used the adjacent primary school SJK(C) Taman Connaught until 1990. Five classrooms were used for administration, teaching, and learning purposes. Eventually, the students and teachers moved to the newly built school on 3 December 1990 although there was no power supply.

The newly completed school comprised two 3-storey buildings, one 2-storey building, six science labs, three life skills workshops, three home science rooms, a canteen, a surau, a staffroom, a car park, a field, and a library. There were 34 classrooms available for teaching and learning activities.

=== 3 computer labs ===
In January 1998, the surau located on the ground floor of Block B was moved to the top floor of Block A while the computer room was moved to the second floor. Subsequently, the computer room was upgraded to a fully equipped computer lab in 2000 with the assistance of the PTA of SMKTC.

With the support of the school's PTA, in January 2002, the first classroom on the first floor of Block B was converted into a second computer lab. In May 2003, the audiovisual room was converted into a third computer lab which was fully funded by the Ministry of Education.

=== Nowadays ===
Today, the school boasts four blocks of buildings, two air-conditioned cabin classrooms, six science labs, three life skills workshops, three computer labs, a newly renovated canteen, a surau, a staffroom with a working centre, a school field, a basketball court, a volleyball court, a sepak takraw court, a resource centre, a self-access learning room, a multimedia room, a first aid room, a music room, an extended car park, and a large hall.

== List of principals ==
No.	Name	Term of office	Contribution
1	En. Phua Ser Chew	December 1985 – April 1991	Laid down a strong foundation for the school to progress in coming years.
2	En. Tang Hock Men	April 1991 – March 2001	Established a strong Parent-Teacher Association (PTA). Improved the school facilities. Formed a basketball team and become the state champion twice in a raw from 1998 to 1999.
3	Tn. Hj. Muhamad Khailani Abdul Jalil	April 2001 – April 2004	Reached a new height in academic performance from 2001 to 2002. On 28 May 2003, the school population has increased to about 2500.
4	Tn. Hj. Jamaludin bin Abdullah, AMN	April 2004 – June 2006	Upgraded the school facilities. Built many reading corners around the school. Upgraded the teacher's car park to a covered car park. Achieved the "Sekolah Harapan" status in the year of 2010. Introduces the "School in Garden".
5	Datin Norihan binti Ahmad	July 2006 – September 2007	Installed automatic gate and close-circuit television (CCTV) at strategic places in the school. Further improved and renamed the staffroom as "Bilik Cahaya".
6	Pn. Radiah binti Nordin	September 2007 – March 2011	Introduced enrichment programmes to help and inspire the weak students. Improved the school discipline. Maintained a cleaner environment and surroundings. Increased participation in the school extra-curricular activities. Introduced Karate.
7	Pn. Hajah Siti Zarinah binti Che Omar	July 2011 – August 2016	Increased the professional development of the teachers and staff. Upgraded the physical development of the school by introduced the PBS room, archive file room, SPSK room and the Locker System for the students. Upgraded the school's financial system. Increased the green environment programme for the school compound.
8	Pn. Norbani binti Baba	October 2016 – April 2018	
9	En. Musa bin Mohamed Yusof	June 2018 – April 2022	
10	En. Abdul Samad bin Othman	April 2022 – April 2023	
11	En. Suhaimi bin Mustapa	June 2023 – Incumbent	

== See also ==
- List of schools in Malaysia
- Taman Connaught
