= Special Envoy of the Prime Minister of Malaysia =

- Duta Khas Perdana Menteri Malaysia
- Style: Yang Berhormat (The Honourable) unless otherwise specified
- Reports to: Parliament
- Nominator: Prime Minister
- Appointer: Yang di-Pertuan Agong
- Term length: Two years
- Formation: 1 January 2011
- First holder: Samy Vellu
- Salary: RM27,227.20 per month

The special envoys of the prime minister of Malaysia (Malay: Duta Khas Perdana Menteri Malaysia) are individuals, usually politicians, appointed with specific assignments to enhance the relationship between Malaysia with particular states or regions where Malaysia has considerable economic interests and cultural similarities. In contrast to that of ambassadorial appointments, Malaysian special envoys are not appointed by the Yang di-Pertuan Agong (King of Malaysia) as head of state, but rather are direct appointees of the head of government, the prime minister of Malaysia. They are often appointed with the rank equivalent to a minister.

Special envoys are often accorded a team consisting of between four and eight personnel, usually including a senior private secretary, special officer, two special assistants and some with a police escort.

Although most special envoys have been appointed with ministerial rank, the salaries drawn have varied depending on portfolio. Known individuals who have served in this capacity without drawing any salary include Ong Ka Ting and Tiong King Sing during Tiong's first posting to East Asia. Nevertheless, Ong was listed as receiving a monthly salary of RM20,000 during his earlier terms as special envoy.

== List of special envoys of the prime ministers of Malaysia ==
Colour key (for political coalition/parties):

Coalition	Member party	Appointee(s)
Barisan Nasional (BN)	Malaysian Chinese Association (MCA)	1
Barisan Nasional (BN)	Malaysian Indian Congress (MIC)	1
Barisan Nasional (BN)	Sarawak Progressive Democratic Party (SPDP)	1
Barisan Nasional (BN)	United Malays National Organisation (UMNO)	1
Pakatan Harapan (PH)	Democratic Action Party (DAP)	1
Gagasan Sejahtera (GS)	Malaysian Islamic Party (PAS)	1
Muafakat Nasional (MN)	Malaysian Islamic Party (PAS)	1
Perikatan Nasional (PN)	Malaysian Islamic Party (PAS)	1
Gabungan Parti Sarawak (GPS)	Progressive Democratic Party (PDP)	1
Gabungan Parti Sarawak (GPS)	Sarawak United Peoples' Party (SUPP)	1

*	Appointment with ministerial rank

Portrait	Name (Birth–Death) Constituency (if any)	Political coalition	Political party	Appointment	Areas and portfolios		Took office	Left office	Time in office	Prime Minister
	Tun; Samy Vellu; SSM SUMW SSAP PNBS SPMP; 8 March 1936 - 15 September 2022 (aged 86)	Barisan Nasional (BN)	Malaysian Indian Congress (MIC)	Special Envoy of Infrastructure to India and South Asia	(India)	Republic of India	1 January 2011	30 June 2018	7 years and 181 days	Najib Razak
	Tun; Samy Vellu; SSM SUMW SSAP PNBS SPMP; 8 March 1936 - 15 September 2022 (aged 86)	Barisan Nasional (BN)	Malaysian Indian Congress (MIC)	Special Envoy of Infrastructure to India and South Asia	(Bangladesh)	People's Republic of Bangladesh	1 January 2011	30 June 2018	7 years and 181 days	Najib Razak
	Tun; Samy Vellu; SSM SUMW SSAP PNBS SPMP; 8 March 1936 - 15 September 2022 (aged 86)	Barisan Nasional (BN)	Malaysian Indian Congress (MIC)	Special Envoy of Infrastructure to India and South Asia	(Bhutan)	Kingdom of Bhutan	1 January 2011	30 June 2018	7 years and 181 days	Najib Razak
	Tun; Samy Vellu; SSM SUMW SSAP PNBS SPMP; 8 March 1936 - 15 September 2022 (aged 86)	Barisan Nasional (BN)	Malaysian Indian Congress (MIC)	Special Envoy of Infrastructure to India and South Asia	(Maldives)	Republic of Maldives	1 January 2011	30 June 2018	7 years and 181 days	Najib Razak
	Tun; Samy Vellu; SSM SUMW SSAP PNBS SPMP; 8 March 1936 - 15 September 2022 (aged 86)	Barisan Nasional (BN)	Malaysian Indian Congress (MIC)	Special Envoy of Infrastructure to India and South Asia	(Nepal)	Federal Democratic Republic of Nepal	1 January 2011	30 June 2018	7 years and 181 days	Najib Razak
	Tun; Samy Vellu; SSM SUMW SSAP PNBS SPMP; 8 March 1936 - 15 September 2022 (aged 86)	Barisan Nasional (BN)	Malaysian Indian Congress (MIC)	Special Envoy of Infrastructure to India and South Asia	(Pakistan)	Islamic Republic of Pakistan	1 January 2011	30 June 2018	7 years and 181 days	Najib Razak
	Tun; Samy Vellu; SSM SUMW SSAP PNBS SPMP; 8 March 1936 - 15 September 2022 (aged 86)	Barisan Nasional (BN)	Malaysian Indian Congress (MIC)	Special Envoy of Infrastructure to India and South Asia	(Sri Lanka)	Democratic Socialist Republic of Sri Lanka	1 January 2011	30 June 2018	7 years and 181 days	Najib Razak
	Tan Sri Dato' Seri; Ong Ka Ting; PMN DPMS SPMP DPMP; 15 November 1956 (age 69)	Barisan Nasional (BN)	Malaysian Chinese Association (MCA)	Special Envoy to China	(China)	People's Republic of China	1 November 2011	31 December 2017	6 years and 61 days	Najib Razak
	Tan Sri Dato' Seri; Jamaluddin Jarjis; PSM SPMP SSAP SJMK SIMP DIMP; 25 May 1951 – 4 April 2015 (aged 63); MP for Rompin	Barisan Nasional (BN)	United Malays National Organisation (UMNO)	Special Envoy to the United States	(United States)	United States of America	1 March 2012	4 April 2015	3 years and 35 days	Najib Razak
	Dato Sri; Tiong King Sing; PNBS SSAP PJN DPMK SSSA DSSA; 3 September 1961 (age 65); MP for Bintulu	Barisan Nasional (BN)	Sarawak Progressive Democratic Party (SPDP)	Special Envoy to East Asia	(Japan)	Japan	3 January 2014	30 June 2018	4 years and 179 days	Najib Razak
	Dato Sri; Tiong King Sing; PNBS SSAP PJN DPMK SSSA DSSA; 3 September 1961 (age 65); MP for Bintulu	Barisan Nasional (BN)	Sarawak Progressive Democratic Party (SPDP)	Special Envoy to East Asia	(Korea)	Republic of Korea	3 January 2014	30 June 2018	4 years and 179 days	Najib Razak
	Dato Sri; Tiong King Sing; PNBS SSAP PJN DPMK SSSA DSSA; 3 September 1961 (age 65); MP for Bintulu	Barisan Nasional (BN)	Sarawak Progressive Democratic Party (SPDP)	Special Envoy to East Asia	(Taiwan)	Republic of China	3 January 2014	30 June 2018	4 years and 179 days	Najib Razak
	Tan Sri Dato' Seri; Khalid Abu Bakar; PMN PSM SPDK SPTS SSTM SSIS SJMK SSAP DCSM DHMS DPMS DIMP; 5 September 1957 (age 69)	–	–	Special Envoy of Combating Terrorism, Extremism and Human Trafficking	–	–	5 September 2017	30 June 2018	299 days	Najib Razak
	Tuan; Tan Kok Wai; 7 October 1957 (age 69); MP for Cheras	Pakatan Harapan (PH)	Democratic Action Party (DAP)	Special Envoy to China	(China)	People's Republic of China	25 July 2018	1 March 2020	1 year and 220 days	Mahathir Mohamad
	Tan Sri Dato' Seri Tuan Guru Haji; Abdul Hadi Awang; PSM SSMT; 20 October 1947 (age 78); MP for Marang	Perikatan Nasional (PN)	Malaysian Islamic Party (PAS)	Special Envoy to the Middle East	(Saudi Arabia)	Kingdom of Saudi Arabia	2 April 2020	24 November 2022	2 years and 237 days	Muhyiddin Yassin Ismail Sabri Yaakob
	Tan Sri Dato' Seri Tuan Guru Haji; Abdul Hadi Awang; PSM SSMT; 20 October 1947 (age 78); MP for Marang	Perikatan Nasional (PN)	Malaysian Islamic Party (PAS)	Special Envoy to the Middle East	(Bahrain)	Kingdom of Bahrain	2 April 2020	24 November 2022	2 years and 237 days	Muhyiddin Yassin Ismail Sabri Yaakob
	Tan Sri Dato' Seri Tuan Guru Haji; Abdul Hadi Awang; PSM SSMT; 20 October 1947 (age 78); MP for Marang	Perikatan Nasional (PN)	Malaysian Islamic Party (PAS)	Special Envoy to the Middle East	(Egypt)	Arab Republic of Egypt	2 April 2020	24 November 2022	2 years and 237 days	Muhyiddin Yassin Ismail Sabri Yaakob
	Tan Sri Dato' Seri Tuan Guru Haji; Abdul Hadi Awang; PSM SSMT; 20 October 1947 (age 78); MP for Marang	Perikatan Nasional (PN)	Malaysian Islamic Party (PAS)	Special Envoy to the Middle East	(Jordan)	Hashemite Kingdom of Jordan	2 April 2020	24 November 2022	2 years and 237 days	Muhyiddin Yassin Ismail Sabri Yaakob
	Tan Sri Dato' Seri Tuan Guru Haji; Abdul Hadi Awang; PSM SSMT; 20 October 1947 (age 78); MP for Marang	Perikatan Nasional (PN)	Malaysian Islamic Party (PAS)	Special Envoy to the Middle East	(Kuwait)	State of Kuwait	2 April 2020	24 November 2022	2 years and 237 days	Muhyiddin Yassin Ismail Sabri Yaakob
	Tan Sri Dato' Seri Tuan Guru Haji; Abdul Hadi Awang; PSM SSMT; 20 October 1947 (age 78); MP for Marang	Perikatan Nasional (PN)	Malaysian Islamic Party (PAS)	Special Envoy to the Middle East	(Lebanon)	Lebanese Republic	2 April 2020	24 November 2022	2 years and 237 days	Muhyiddin Yassin Ismail Sabri Yaakob
	Tan Sri Dato' Seri Tuan Guru Haji; Abdul Hadi Awang; PSM SSMT; 20 October 1947 (age 78); MP for Marang	Perikatan Nasional (PN)	Malaysian Islamic Party (PAS)	Special Envoy to the Middle East	(Oman)	Sultanate of Oman	2 April 2020	24 November 2022	2 years and 237 days	Muhyiddin Yassin Ismail Sabri Yaakob
	Tan Sri Dato' Seri Tuan Guru Haji; Abdul Hadi Awang; PSM SSMT; 20 October 1947 (age 78); MP for Marang	Perikatan Nasional (PN)	Malaysian Islamic Party (PAS)	Special Envoy to the Middle East	(Syria)	Syrian Arab Republic	2 April 2020	24 November 2022	2 years and 237 days	Muhyiddin Yassin Ismail Sabri Yaakob
	Tan Sri Dato' Seri Tuan Guru Haji; Abdul Hadi Awang; PSM SSMT; 20 October 1947 (age 78); MP for Marang	Perikatan Nasional (PN)	Malaysian Islamic Party (PAS)	Special Envoy to the Middle East	(United Arab Emirates)	United Arab Emirates	2 April 2020	24 November 2022	2 years and 237 days	Muhyiddin Yassin Ismail Sabri Yaakob
	Dato Sri; Tiong King Sing; PNBS SSAP PJN DPMK SSSA DSSA; 3 September 1961 (age 65); MP for Bintulu	Gabungan Parti Sarawak (GPS)	Progressive Democratic Party (PDP)	Special Envoy to People's Republic of China	(China)	People's Republic of China, Hong Kong and Macao	20 April 2020	24 November 2022	2 years and 219 days	Muhyiddin Yassin Ismail Sabri Yaakob
	Dato Sri; Richard Riot Jaem; PNBS SSAP PJN KMN; 1 December 1951 (age 74); MP for Serian	Gabungan Parti Sarawak (GPS)	Sarawak United Peoples' Party (SUPP)	Special Envoy to East Asia	(Japan)	Japan	16 May 2020	24 November 2022	6 years and 116 days	Muhyiddin Yassin Ismail Sabri Yaakob
	Dato Sri; Richard Riot Jaem; PNBS SSAP PJN KMN; 1 December 1951 (age 74); MP for Serian	Gabungan Parti Sarawak (GPS)	Sarawak United Peoples' Party (SUPP)	Special Envoy to East Asia	(Korea)	Republic of Korea	16 May 2020	24 November 2022	6 years and 116 days	Muhyiddin Yassin Ismail Sabri Yaakob
	Dato Sri; Richard Riot Jaem; PNBS SSAP PJN KMN; 1 December 1951 (age 74); MP for Serian	Gabungan Parti Sarawak (GPS)	Sarawak United Peoples' Party (SUPP)	Special Envoy to East Asia	(Taiwan)	Republic of China	16 May 2020	24 November 2022	6 years and 116 days	Muhyiddin Yassin Ismail Sabri Yaakob
	Tan Sri Dato' Sri; Vigneswaran Sanasee PSM SSAP DPSM; 16 December 1965 (age 56)	Barisan Nasional (BN)	Malaysian Indian Congress (MIC)	Special Envoy to South Asia	(India)	Republic of India	14 November 2021	24 November 2022	1 year and 11 days	Ismail Sabri Yaakob
	Tan Sri Dato' Sri; Vigneswaran Sanasee PSM SSAP DPSM; 16 December 1965 (age 56)	Barisan Nasional (BN)	Malaysian Indian Congress (MIC)	Special Envoy to South Asia	(Bangladesh)	People's Republic of Bangladesh	14 November 2021	24 November 2022	1 year and 11 days	Ismail Sabri Yaakob
	Tan Sri Dato' Sri; Vigneswaran Sanasee PSM SSAP DPSM; 16 December 1965 (age 56)	Barisan Nasional (BN)	Malaysian Indian Congress (MIC)	Special Envoy to South Asia	(Bhutan)	Kingdom of Bhutan	14 November 2021	24 November 2022	1 year and 11 days	Ismail Sabri Yaakob
	Tan Sri Dato' Sri; Vigneswaran Sanasee PSM SSAP DPSM; 16 December 1965 (age 56)	Barisan Nasional (BN)	Malaysian Indian Congress (MIC)	Special Envoy to South Asia	(Maldives)	Republic of Maldives	14 November 2021	24 November 2022	1 year and 11 days	Ismail Sabri Yaakob
	Tan Sri Dato' Sri; Vigneswaran Sanasee PSM SSAP DPSM; 16 December 1965 (age 56)	Barisan Nasional (BN)	Malaysian Indian Congress (MIC)	Special Envoy to South Asia	(Nepal)	Federal Democratic Republic of Nepal	14 November 2021	24 November 2022	1 year and 11 days	Ismail Sabri Yaakob
	Tan Sri Dato' Sri; Vigneswaran Sanasee PSM SSAP DPSM; 16 December 1965 (age 56)	Barisan Nasional (BN)	Malaysian Indian Congress (MIC)	Special Envoy to South Asia	(Pakistan)	Islamic Republic of Pakistan	14 November 2021	24 November 2022	1 year and 11 days	Ismail Sabri Yaakob
	Tan Sri Dato' Sri; Vigneswaran Sanasee PSM SSAP DPSM; 16 December 1965 (age 56)	Barisan Nasional (BN)	Malaysian Indian Congress (MIC)	Special Envoy to South Asia	(Sri Lanka)	Democratic Socialist Republic of Sri Lanka	14 November 2021	24 November 2022	1 year and 11 days	Ismail Sabri Yaakob

== Controversy ==
The appointment of special envoys during the Barisan Nasional (BN) tenure was met with repeated accusations of unnecessary government expenditure due to the high salaries of these appointees. Concerns were also raised regarding the overlap in responsibilities and functions with respective ambassadors already in office(s). When the Pakatan Harapan (PH) coalition came to power, all previously appointed special envoys had their tenures cut short. Nonetheless, the PH eventually appointed a single special envoy, albeit without ministerial rank, when Tan Kok Wai was announced as special envoy to the People's Republic of China and concurrently as chairperson of the Malaysia-China Business Council (MCBC) in August 2018. The then-Malaysian Minister of Foreign Affairs, Saifuddin Abdullah, commented that the role of the special envoy would be to "complement" that of the ambassador in specialised areas.

Following the 2020–21 Malaysian political crisis, further controversy erupted when newly appointed prime minister, Muhyiddin Yassin, was accused of appointing individuals as special envoys to secure his position.

== See also ==
- List of ambassadors and high commissioners of Malaysia
- List of diplomatic missions of Malaysia
- Foreign relations of Malaysia
