= Cheras (federal constituency) =

Federal constituency in Malaysia

Cheras (P123)
Kuala Lumpur constituency

Federal constituency
- Legislature: Dewan Rakyat
- MP: Tan Kok Wai; PH
- Constituency created: 1994
- First contested: 1995
- Last contested: 2022

Demographics
- Population (2020): 135,823
- Electors (2022): 101,184
- Area (km²): 16
- Pop. density (per km²): 8,488.9

Cheras is a federal constituency in the Federal Territory of Kuala Lumpur, Malaysia, that has been represented in the Dewan Rakyat since 1995.

The federal constituency was created in the 1994 redistribution and is mandated to return a single member to the Dewan Rakyat under the first past the post voting system.

== Demographics ==
Ethnic breakdown of Cheras's electorate as of 2022
1. Chinese (77.1%)
2. Malay (14.8%)
3. Indian (7.60%)
4. Other ethnicities (0.60%)
Age breakdown of Cheras's electorate as of 2022
1. 18-20 (3.79%)
2. 21-29 (13.8%)
3. 30-39 (16.2%)
4. 40-49 (17.9%)
5. 50-59 (18.4%)
6. 60-69 (17.1%)
7. 70-79 (9.07%)
8. 80-89 (3.14%)
9. above 90 (0.64%)
Gender breakdown of Cheras's electorate as of 2022
1. Male (49.9%)
2. Female (50.1%)

According to the August 2022 Electoral Roll used for the 2022 Malaysian general election, the Cheras constituency has 101,184 registered voters, of whom 14.8% are Malay, 77.1% are Chinese, 7.60% are Indian, and 0.60% are from other ethnic groups. In the 2018 general election, the constituency had 78,819 registered voters. The 2022 general election saw an increase of 22,365 voters, a 28.38% increase. In terms of percentage of voters by ethnic group, the Malay population increased by 4.84%, the Chinese decreased by 5.34%, the Indian population decreased by 0.92%, and the other ethnic groups increased by 0.28%.

Change of electorate in Cheras (by percentage)
Election	Electorate				Voters	Change
Election	Malay	Chinese	Indian	Other	Voters	Change
2022	14.8	77.1	7.60	0.60	101,184	+
2018	9.96	83.04	6.68	0.32	78,819	+8.64%
2013	10.33	81.79	7.25	0.63	72,551	+5.57%
2008	9.56	84.14	6.16	0.14	68,725	+1.37%
2004	9.1	83.4	7.1	0.5	67,794	+3.06%
1999	8.7	83.9	6.3	1.1	65,784	+2.96%
1995	8.0	85.5	5.5	1.0	63,895	－

== History ==
=== Polling districts ===
According to the gazette issued on 31 October 2022, the Cheras constituency has a total of 19 polling districts.

Polling district	Code	Location
Jalan Pasar	123/00/01	Kolej Tingkatan Enam Pudu Jaya
Jalan San Peng	123/00/02	SMK Dato' Onn
Rumah Pangsa Loke Yew	123/00/03	SM Tsun Jin (Persendirian)
Jalan Loke Yew	123/00/04	SJK (C) Chung Kwo
Kampung Loke Yew	123/00/05	SJK (T) Jln San Peng
Jalan Sungai Besi	123/00/06	SJK (C) Sam Yoke
Jalan Chan Sow Lin	123/00/07	SK Convent Jln Peel
Pudu Hujung	123/00/08	SK (P) Pudu 1
Jalan Cheras	123/00/09	SK Jalan Peel
Pudu Ulu	123/00/10	SJK (T) Jalan Cheras
Taman Miharja	123/00/11	SMK Miharja
Batu 3 -4 Jalan Cheras	123/00/12	SK Yaacob Latif 1
Taman Shamelin Perkasa	123/00/13	SK Seri Bintang Utara
Kampong Cheras Batu 4	123/00/14	SMK Seri Bintang Selatan
Bukit A Cheras Baru	123/00/15	SRA An-Nur, Cheras Baru; Dewan Serbaguna Kampung Cheras
Cheras Baru	123/00/16	SK Seri Bintang Selatan
Taman Cheras	123/00/17	SM Sri Sempurna (Persendirian)
Taman Midah Kanan	123/00/18	SK Taman Midah 2
Taman Midah Kiri	123/00/19	SK Taman Midah
Taman Mutiara Barat	123/00/20	SMK Seri Mutiara
Taman Segar	123/00/21	SK Taman Segar; Dewan Serbaguna Taman Segar
Taynton View	123/00/22	SJK (C) Imbi
Taman Connaught Utara	123/00/23	SMK Taman Connaught
Taman Connaught Selatan	123/00/24	SMK Orkid Desa

=== Representation history ===
Members of Parliament for Cheras
Parliament	No	Years	Member	Party	Vote Share
Constituency created from Sungai Besi
9th	P111	1995–1999	Tan Kok Wai (陈国伟)	GR (DAP)	29,240; 66.30%
10th	P111	1999–2004	Tan Kok Wai (陈国伟)	BA (DAP)	27,579; 59.74%
11th	P123	2004–2008	Tan Kok Wai (陈国伟)	DAP	29,056; 62.82%
12th	P123	2008–2013	Tan Kok Wai (陈国伟)	PR (DAP)	39,253; 78.18%
13th	P123	2013–2015	Tan Kok Wai (陈国伟)	PR (DAP)	48,249; 81.65%
13th	P123	2015–2018	Tan Kok Wai (陈国伟)	PH (DAP)	48,249; 81.65%
14th	P123	2018–2022	Tan Kok Wai (陈国伟)	PH (DAP)	56,671; 89.00%
15th	P123	2022–present	Tan Kok Wai (陈国伟)	PH (DAP)	60,294; 84.04%

=== Historical boundaries ===
Federal constituency	Area		
Federal constituency	1994	2003	2018
Cheras	Pudu; Shamelin Perkasa; Taman Cheras; Taman Midah; Taman Pertama		Pudu; Shamelin Perkasa; Taman Connaught; Taman Midah; Taman Pertama

=== Local governments & postcodes ===
No.	Local government	Postcode
P123	Kuala Lumpur City Hall	50460, 55100, 55200, 55300, 56000, 56100 Kuala Lumpur

== Election results ==
Malaysian general election, 2022
Party	Candidate	Votes	%	∆%
PH	Tan Kok Wai	60,294	84.04	▲84.04
PN	Chin Yoke Kheng	5,846	8.15	▲8.15
BN	Chong Yew Chuan	5,606	7.81	▼3.19
Total valid votes		71,746	100.00	
Total rejected ballots		300		
Unreturned ballots		161		
Turnout		72,207	71.40	▼9.89
Registered electors		101,184		
Majority		54,448	75.89	▼2.11
PH hold		Swing		
Source(s) https://lom.agc.gov.my/ilims/upload/portal/akta/outputp/1753271/PUB%20613%20(2022)%20-%20PARLIMEN%20WP%20KUALA%20LUMPUR.pdf

Malaysian general election, 2018
Party	Candidate	Votes	%	∆%
PKR	Tan Kok Wai	56,671	89.00	▲7.35
BN	Heng Sinn Yee	7,006	11.00	▼7.35
Total valid votes		63,677	100.00	
Total rejected ballots		275		
Unreturned ballots		122		
Turnout		64,074	81.29	▼0.71
Registered electors		78,819		
Majority		49,665	78.00	▲14.70
PKR hold		Swing		
Source(s) "His Majesty's Government Gazette - Notice of Contested Election, Parliament for the Federal Territory of Kuala Lumpur [P.U. (B) 240/2018]" (PDF). Attorney General's Chambers of Malaysia. 3 May 2018. "Federal Government Gazette - Results of Contested Election and Statements of the Poll after the Official Addition of Votes, Parliamentary Constituencies for the Federal Territory of Kuala Lumpur [P.U. (B) 314/2018]" (PDF). Attorney General's Chambers of Malaysia. 28 May 2018.

Malaysian general election, 2013
Party	Candidate	Votes	%	∆%
DAP	Tan Kok Wai	48,249	81.65	▲3.47
BN	Steve Teoh Chee Hooi	10,840	18.35	▼3.47
Total valid votes		59,089	100.00	
Total rejected ballots		315		
Unreturned ballots		88		
Turnout		59,492	82.00	▲8.42
Registered electors		72,551		
Majority		37,409	63.30	▲6.94
DAP hold		Swing		
Source(s) "Federal Government Gazette - Notice of Contested Election, Parliament for the Federal Territory of Kuala Lumpur [P.U. (B) 177/2013]" (PDF). Attorney General's Chambers of Malaysia. 26 April 2013. Archived from the original (PDF) on 2 October 2018. "Federal Government Gazette - Results of Contested Election and Statements of the Poll after the Official Addition of Votes, Parliamentary Constituencies for the Federal Territory of Kuala Lumpur [P.U. (B) 218/2013]" (PDF). Attorney General's Chambers of Malaysia. 22 May 2013. Archived from the original (PDF) on 2 October 2018.

Malaysian general election, 2008
Party	Candidate	Votes	%	∆%
DAP	Tan Kok Wai	39,253	78.18	▲15.36
BN	Jeffrey Goh Sim Ik	10,953	21.82	▼15.36
Total valid votes		50,206	100.00	
Total rejected ballots		224		
Unreturned ballots		121		
Turnout		50,571	73.58	▲4.94
Registered electors		68,725		
Majority		28,300	56.36	▲30.72
DAP hold		Swing		

Malaysian general election, 2004
Party	Candidate	Votes	%	∆%
DAP	Tan Kok Wai	29,056	62.82	▲3.08
BN	Lee Boon Kok	17,195	37.18	▼3.08
Total valid votes		46,251	100.00	
Total rejected ballots		248		
Unreturned ballots		34		
Turnout		46,533	68.64	▼1.99
Registered electors		67,793		
Majority		11,861	25.64	▲6.16
DAP hold		Swing		

Malaysian general election, 1999
Party	Candidate	Votes	%	∆%
DAP	Tan Kok Wai	27,579	59.74	▼6.56
BN	Lee Boon Kok	18,587	40.26	▲6.56
Total valid votes		46,166	100.00	
Total rejected ballots		217		
Unreturned ballots		82		
Turnout		46,465	70.63	▲1.13
Registered electors		65,786		
Majority		8,992	19.48	▼13.12
DAP hold		Swing		

Malaysian general election, 1995
Party	Candidate	Votes	%
DAP	Tan Kok Wai	29,240	66.30
BN	Mook Soon Man @ Mok Soon Cheong	14,865	33.70
Total valid votes		44,105	100.00
Total rejected ballots		224	
Unreturned ballots		77	
Turnout		44,406	69.50
Registered electors		63,894	
Majority		14,375	32.60
This was a new constituency created.
