= Tiong King Sing =

Malaysian politician and businessman

Yang Berhormat Dato Sri Tiong King Sing PJN SSAP SSSA DGSM PNBS DPMK DSSA JP MP
- 张庆信
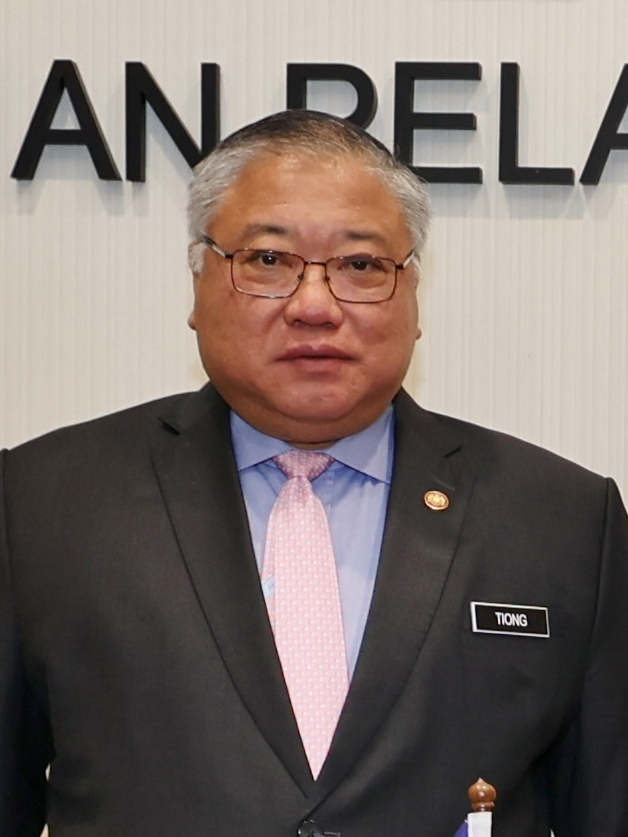
- Tiong in 2023

Minister of Tourism, Arts and Culture
- Incumbent
- Assumed office 3 December 2022
- Monarchs: Abdullah (2022–2024); Ibrahim Iskandar (since 2024)
- Prime Minister: Anwar Ibrahim
- Deputy: Khairul Firdaus Akbar Khan (2022-2025); Chiew Choon Man (since 2025)
- Preceded by: Nancy Shukri
- Constituency: Bintulu

Special Envoy of the Prime Minister to China
- In office 20 April 2020 – 24 November 2022
- Monarch: Abdullah
- Prime Minister: Muhyiddin Yassin (2020–2021); Ismail Sabri Yaakob (2021–2022)
- Preceded by: Tan Kok Wai

Special Envoy of the Prime Minister to East Asia
- In office 3 January 2014 – 30 June 2018
- Monarchs: Abdul Halim (2014–2016); Muhammad V (2016–2018)
- Prime Minister: Najib Razak (2014–2018); Mahathir Mohamad (2018)
- Preceded by: Position established
- Succeeded by: Richard Riot Jaem

Member of the Malaysian Parliament for Bintulu
- Incumbent
- Assumed office 29 November 1999
- Preceded by: Chiew Chiu Sing (DAP)
- Majority: 1,400 (1999); 11,267 (2004); 14,966 (2008); 7,433 (2013); 7,022 (2018); 22,168 (2022)

Member of the Sarawak State Legislative Assembly for Dudong
- Incumbent
- Assumed office 18 December 2021
- Preceded by: Tiong Thai King (BN–SUPP)
- Majority: 5,806 (2021)

President of the Progressive Democratic Party
- Incumbent
- Assumed office 14 November 2017
- Deputy: Nelson Balang Rining; Anthony Nogeh Gumbek (until 2023); Henry Harry Jinep (since 2023)
- Preceded by: Position established

President of the Sarawak Progressive Democratic Party
- In office 15 May 2014 – 14 November 2017 (Acting:15 May 2014–15 November 2014)
- Deputy: Nelson Balang Rining
- Preceded by: William Mawan Ikom
- Succeeded by: Position abolished

Deputy President of the Sarawak Progressive Democratic Party
- In office 18 March 2012 – 15 November 2014
- President: William Mawan Ikom
- Preceded by: Peter Nyarok
- Succeeded by: William Rining Balang

3rd Chairman of the Barisan Nasional Backbenchers Club
- In office 18 April 2008 – 26 June 2013
- Deputy: Bung Moktar Radin
- Preceded by: Raja Ahmad Zainuddin Raja Omar
- Succeeded by: Shahrir Abdul Samad

Faction represented in Dewan Rakyat
- 1999–2018: Barisan Nasional
- 2018: Progressive Democratic Party
- 2018–: Gabungan Parti Sarawak

Faction represented in Sarawak State Legislative Assembly
- 2021–: Gabungan Parti Sarawak

Personal details
- Born: 3 September 1961 (age 65) Sibu, Crown Colony of Sarawak
- Citizenship: Malaysia
- Party: SNAP (until 2002); SPDP (2002–2017); PDP (since 2017)
- Other political affiliations: BN (until 2018); Gabungan Parti Sarawak (since 2018)
- Spouse: Hew Mui Lan
- Education: National Pingtung University of Science and Technology
- Occupation: Businessman; politician
- Website: p216bintulu.com

Chinese name
- Traditional Chinese: 張慶信
- Simplified Chinese: 张庆信
- Hanyu Pinyin: Zhāng Qìngxìn
- Fuzhou BUC: Diŏng Kéng-séng

Tiong King Sing (Note: simplified Chinese: 张庆信; traditional Chinese: 張慶信; pinyin: Zhāng Qìngxìn; Bàng-uâ-cê: Diŏng Kéng-séng) (born 3 September 1961) is a Malaysian politician and businessman who has served as Minister of Tourism, Arts and Culture since 2022. A president of the Progressive Democratic Party (PDP) since 2017, he represented Bintulu in the Parliament of Malaysia since 1999, and represented Dudong in Sarawak State Legislative Assembly since 2021.

He is the Special Envoy of the Prime Ministers Muhyiddin Yassin, Ismail Sabri Yaakob and Anwar to China since April 2020. He served as Special Envoy of the Prime Ministers Najib Razak and Mahathir Mohamad to East Asia from 2014 to 2018. He has served as President of PDP since November 2017. In accordance with its expansion to West Malaysia in November 2017, the party was rebranded with its new name and logo from the Sarawak Progressive Democratic Party (SPDP), a former component party of the BN coalition. He served as the 3rd Chairman of the BN Backbenchers Club from April 2008 to June 2013. He also served as President of SPDP from May 2014 to November 2017 and Deputy President of SPDP from March 2012 to his promotion to the SPDP presidency in May 2014 and previously the Treasurer-General of SPDP. Following the collapse of the BN administration after the 2018 general election and in the aftermath, a meeting between all Sarawak-based BN component parties was held on 12 June 2018, PDP decided to leave the coalition with the other three parties to form a new Sarawak-based political coalition in the meeting, namely the GPS. He is also one of the only two PDP MPs alongside Baram MP Anyi Ngau.

== Political career ==
Tiong was originally a member of the Sarawak National Party (SNAP) but was dismissed in 2002 for what the party cited as disciplinary reasons. He subsequently joined the SPDP.

At the 2008 general election, he successfully defended his seat receiving 73% of the vote.

Tiong was re-elected to Parliament again in 2013 general election, and the following year became the President of the SPDP, replacing William Mawan Ikom, who had resigned from the party.

In the 2018 general election, Tiong retained his seat in Bintulu with a majority of 7,022.

In the 2022 general election, Tiong won his seat in Bintulu with overwhelming majority of 22,168. On 3 December 2022, Tiong is appointed by Prime Minister Anwar Ibrahim as the Minister of Tourism.

== Issues raised ==
=== Gangsterism in Sarawak ===
In 2007 he became involved in a dispute with police administration alleging that criminal gangs were acting with impunity throughout Sarawak but that his concerns were not being addressed by police. His outspokenness was reported to have triggered a large police operation against criminal organisations in the State. Tiong subsequently received mail threats, including a parcel of shotgun cartridges, at his constituency office.

=== Pan Borneo Highway ===
In 2013, Tiong urged the repair of the Pan-Borneo Highway because poor road conditions were causing fatal road traffic accidents on the highway. In 2016, he expressed his desire for the highway project to include expanding the coastal road connecting Bintulu and Miri into a double carriageway. In 2017, Tiong criticised the Pan Borneo Highway project for bypassing Bintulu, thus depriving his parliamentary constituents of its benefits. In 2018, Tiong criticised the highway contractors for creating potholes, causing damage to public utilities, and for not installing sufficient warning signs.

In June 2019, he complained again that the Pan Borneo Highway road conditions did not improve despite road inspections conducted by Democratic Action Party (DAP), which at that time was part of the ruling Pakatan Harapan coalition. In December 2019, Tiong criticised works minister Baru Bian for slow response to Pan Borneo Highway issues. He also alleged that Work Package Contractors (WPCs) were paid despite substandard work. In response, the Works Ministry said that the federal government had appointed Lebuhraya Borneo Utara (LBU) to oversee WPC projects. LBU was also delegated authority to disburse payments to the WPCs. Shortly thereafter, the federal government issued a termination letter on 20 September 2019 to LBU with effect from 20 February 2020.

=== COVID-19 pandemic ===
On 21 June 2020, as a result from Tiong's effort in raising funds from private sector and individuals, a polymerase chain reaction (PCR) lab was set up in Bintulu Hospital to conduct tests for COVID-19 without the need to send the samples to Sibu or Kuching for processing. In July 2020, he also complained the slow response of Malaysian Ministry of Health in supplying personal protective equipment (PPE) to Sarawak during the COVID-19 pandemic in the country. He also denounced the use of rapid RTK antigen tests for COVID-19 due to high false negatives rates amongst the patients screened. However, according to Malaysian Institute of Medical Research, the antigen RTK's sensitivity level stood at 90 per cent, while specificity remains at 100 per cent.

== Controversies ==
=== Kong-Kali-Kong pet phrase ===
In 2015, Tiong King Sing introduced a pet phrase into Parliament when he described Opposition lawmakers as "Kong-Kali-Kong" MPs. Tiong made the remark after several opposition MPs lashed out at Barisan Nasional (BN) lawmakers, in particular Azalina Othman Said (Umno-Pengerang) for tabling a motion to suspend Lim Kit Siang (DAP-Gelang Patah). Among the opposition lawmakers who voiced their disagreement with the tabling of the motion were Gobind Singh Deo (DAP-Puchong), Ramkarpal Singh (DAP-Bukit Gelugor), Khalid Samad (Amanah-Shah Alam) and Tony Pua (DAP-Petaling Jaya Utara). In an attempt to silence them, Tiong used the term "Kong-Kali-Kong" on them, which he explained as "empty vessels" or "people with no insight on any matter whatsoever." This remark was followed by roars of laughter from other MPs who practically drowned out Gobind, who asked sarcastically, "What does that mean? Is that Bahasa Malaysia?" The pandemonium was triggered when Lim was suspended from Parliament for six months for refusing to apologise or retract his allegation that Pandikar Amin Mulia had abused his position as Dewan Rakyat Speaker on the Public Accounts Committee's (PAC) investigations on 1Malaysia Development Bhd (1MDB) when he ordered that the PAC be temporarily suspended. Speaking up in defence of Pandikar, Tiong said the Speaker had to be firm in allowing the motion to be tabled by Azalina for voting. "Remember, we have to respect the Speaker," Tiong said, adding that he believed opposition MPs would never admit their faults and would instead continue to block the issue from being debated.

=== "Afraid to die" remark against Director-General of Health ===
On 11 November 2020, Tiong criticised Director-General (DG) of Health, Dr. Noor Hisham Abdullah that he did not visit Bintulu during the COVID-19 pandemic and alleged that the DG is "afraid to die". However Noor Hisham defended himself that he had visited Sabah in August 2020 for preparation works before Sabah State Election. He also sent his deputies to Sabah in November during Sabah COVID-19 pandemic. He also said that death does not discriminate anyone. Five days later, Tiong apologised for his remark.

=== Criticism of Nancy Pelosi's Taiwan visit ===
On 5 August 2022, Tiong, then the Prime Minister's Special Envoy to China, issued a strongly worded statement against the visit to Taiwan by then US House of Representatives Speaker Nancy Pelosi, accusing Pelosi of violating the one-China principle and destabilising the region. Tiong added that "Taiwan is an inseparable part of Chinese territory" and accused the West of applying double standards between the 2022 Russian invasion of Ukraine and the political status of Taiwan.

Tiong's statement was toned down by then Minister of Foreign Affairs Saifuddin Abdullah, saying that it was not the official position of the government. Tiong's was criticised by some for supposedly compromising Malaysia's neutral stance towards geopolitics issues.

=== KLIA Commotion and Immigration corruption allegation ===
On 29 June 2023, an online news portal reported on an unnamed minister caused a commotion in the Terminal 1 of the Kuala Lumpur International Airport (KLIA). The portal alleged that the minister barged into restricted areas of the KLIA without presenting entry pass to "rescue" a detained tourist from China who was denied entry into the country and caused a ruckus when the minister scolded auxiliary police and Immigration officers. It was also learnt that this was the third time said minister had acted this way over detained foreign tourist. Tiong publicly admitted that he was the minister responsible for the commotion the next day and defended his action as exposing corruption among some KLIA officials. Tiong claims that the detained tourist had her phone illegally confiscated and asked to pay several thousand ringgits to be allowed entry into the country. Tiong said that he was alerted to the incident by the consulate general of Malaysia in Guangzhou and went to KLIA to investigate the incident at 3pm accompanied by officers from the Malaysian Anti-Corruption Commission (MACC). Tiong denied the allegation that he entered the arrival hall illegally as he have an entry pass valid until 2024, a fact confirmed by the Minister of Transport Anthony Loke. Tiong also urged the Minister of Home Affairs Saifuddin Nasution Ismail to take actions to eradicate a "culture of corruption" within the Immigration Department.

The incident generated divided public opinion on Tiong's action. CUEPACS president Datuk Haji Adnan Mat condemn Tiong's action for violating "national security protocols and disrupted the duties of civil servants". UMNO Youth similarly condemn Tiong's "misconduct" and calls for his sacking as minister. However, Tiong's action was also praised by other organisations such as DAP Sarawak and tourism players for exposing corruption.

The incident prompted separate investigations by the Immigration Department, MACC, Royal Malaysian Police (PDRM) and Ministry of Transport. No findings of corruption related to the case were made until now.

== Election results ==
Parliament of Malaysia
Year	Constituency	Candidate	Votes	Pct	Opponent(s)	Votes	Pct	Ballot cast	Majority	Turnout
1999	P190 Bintulu	Tiong King Sing (SNAP)	15,681	52.34%	Chiew Chiu Sing (DAP)	14,281	47.66%	30,437	1,400	66.28%
2004	P216 Bintulu	Tiong King Sing (SPDP)	20,225	63.67%	Chiew Chiu Sing (DAP)	8,958	28.20%	32,067	11,267	64.95%
2004	P216 Bintulu	Tiong King Sing (SPDP)	20,225	63.67%	Lau Hieng Kii (SNAP)	2,583	8.13%	32,067	11,267	64.95%
2008	P217 Bintulu	Tiong King Sing (SPDP)	23,628	73.17%	Lim Su Kien (DAP)	8,662	26.83%	32,629	14,965	64.73%
2013	P217 Bintulu	Tiong King Sing (SPDP)	26,458	58.17%	John Brian Anthony (DAP)	19,025	41.83%	45,968	7,433	76.75%
2018	P217 Bintulu	Tiong King Sing (PDP)	27,076	57.05%	Chiew Chan Yew (DAP)	20,054	42.26%	48,036	7,022	73.85%
2018	P217 Bintulu	Tiong King Sing (PDP)	27,076	57.05%	Chieng Lea Phing (STAR)	328	0.69%	48,036	7,022	73.85%
2022	P217 Bintulu	Tiong King Sing (PDP)	43,455	61.73%	Chiew Chan Yew (DAP)	21,287	30.24%	71,256	22,168	61.97%
2022	P217 Bintulu	Tiong King Sing (PDP)	43,455	61.73%	Duke Janteng (BERSATU)	5,650	8.03%	71,256	22,168	61.97%

Sarawak State Legislative Assembly
Year	Constituency	Candidate	Votes	Pct	Opponent(s)	Votes	Pct	Ballots cast	Majority	Turnout
2021	N52 Dudong	Tiong King Sing (PDP)	9,390	46.99%	Wong Hie Ping (PSB)	3,584	17.93%	19,985	5,806	60.46%
2021	N52 Dudong	Tiong King Sing (PDP)	9,390	46.99%	Paul Ling (DAP)	2,724	13.63%	19,985	5,806	60.46%
2021	N52 Dudong	Tiong King Sing (PDP)	9,390	46.99%	Josephine Lau Kiew Peng (ASPIRASI)	212	1.06%	19,985	5,806	60.46%
2021	N52 Dudong	Tiong King Sing (PDP)	9,390	46.99%	Julius Enchana (PBDSB)	893	4.47%	19,985	5,806	60.46%
2021	N52 Dudong	Tiong King Sing (PDP)	9,390	46.99%	Jane Lau Sing Yee (PBK)	1,779	8.90%	19,985	5,806	60.46%
2021	N52 Dudong	Tiong King Sing (PDP)	9,390	46.99%	Fadhil Mohd Isa (IND)	1,178	5.89%	19,985	5,806	60.46%
2021	N52 Dudong	Tiong King Sing (PDP)	9,390	46.99%	Engga Unchat (IND)	225	1.13%	19,985	5,806	60.46%

== Honours ==
=== Honours of Malaysia ===
- Malaysia
  - Commander of the Order of Meritorious Service (PJN) – Datuk (2007)
  - Recipient of the 15th Yang di-Pertuan Agong Installation Medal
  - Recipient of the 17th Yang di-Pertuan Agong Installation Medal
- Kelantan
  - Knight Commander of the Order of the Crown of Kelantan (DPMK) – Dato' (2009)
- Malacca
  - Grand Commander of the Exalted Order of Malacca (DGSM) – Datuk Seri (2025)
- Pahang
  - Knight Grand Companion of the Order of Sultan Ahmad Shah of Pahang (SSAP) – Dato' Sri (2006)
- Sarawak
  - Knight Commander of the Most Exalted Order of the Star of Sarawak (PNBS) – Dato Sri (2018)
  - Gold Medal of the Sarawak Independence Diamond Jubilee Medal (2023)
- Selangor
  - Knight Grand Companion of the Order of Sultan Salahuddin Abdul Aziz Shah (SSSA) – Dato' Seri (2000)
  - Knight Companion of the Order of Sultan Salahuddin Abdul Aziz Shah (DSSA) – Dato' (1996)

== See also ==
- Bintulu (federal constituency)
