= Murder of Bill Kayong =

2016 assassination of a political activist in Malaysia

Bill Kayong
- Born: Bill Anak Kayong; 8 December 1973; Malaysia
- Died: 21 June 2016 (aged 42); Miri, Sarawak, Malaysia
- Cause of death: Fatal gunshot wounds to the neck
- Resting place: Batu 1 Muslim Cemetery
- Occupations: Social activist politician
- Known for: His murder
- Spouse: Hasyikin Hatta
- Children: 2 (a daughter and a son)

On 21 June 2016, in Sarawak, Malaysia, social activist and politician Bill Kayong was shot dead at a traffic light intersection near a shopping mall in Kuala Baram Bypass, supposedly over his political and advocacy activities. At least five suspects were identified during investigations, and four of them were caught within a year. A trial held from 2017 and 2018 ended with the acquittal of three men, and the fourth defendant Mohamad Fitri Pauzi was found guilty of murdering Kayong, and sentenced to death by hanging in 2018. A fifth man was caught in 2021 after being on the wanted list for five years and sent back to Malaysia to assist in investigations.

== Fatal shooting ==
On the morning of 21 June 2016, a social activist and member of the People's Justice Party was shot dead at a traffic light intersection near a shopping mall in Kuala Baram Bypass at Sarawak, Malaysia.

The deceased politician, 42-year-old Bill Kayong, also known as Mohd Hasbie Abdullah (his Muslim name), was seated in his Toyota truck when he was shot on the neck by a suspected gunman (who used a shotgun), and he died on the spot from two gunshot wounds. Before his death, Kayong was known to have campaigned for the Dayak people's indigenous rights and welfare, including native customary land rights, and during the 2016 state election of Sarawak, Kayong also unsuccessfully contested in the Bekenu seat against Barisan Nasional (BN) direct candidate Rosey Yunus and two independents.

In response to his death, residents of Sarawak, who all suspected that Kayong's death was politically motivated due to his activism, called for immediate justice to be served, and members of Kayong's political party, including its president Datuk Seri Dr Wan Azizah Wan Ismail and her husband Anwar Ibrahim (who would become Prime Minister of Malaysia in 2022), offered their condolences and praised him for his dedication to the party's reform agenda, and also urged the authorities to crack the case. PKR chairman and lawyer Baru Bian also offered his condolences to the family of Kayong, and he described Kayong as a "good comrade" who fought against injustice and described his death as a "cold-blooded murder".

Kayong, the second-youngest of 11 children in his family, left behind a wife and two teenage children (a son and daughter) at the time of his death. Around 5,000 people attended Kayong's funeral and he was later buried at the Muslim cemetery in Jalan Lusut.

== Investigations ==
The death of Kayong was classified as murder, and promising to investigate to the fullest extent, the Royal Malaysia Police appealed for potential witnesses as they kickstarted their investigations in the case. Inspector-General of Police Tan Sri Khalid Abu Bakar also announced that a special task force was set up to conduct a probe into the killing of Kayong. Eventually, nine suspects were arrested within a month after the murder.

On 15 July 2016, two of the nine suspects – 29-year-old bouncer Mohamad Fitri Pauzi and 37-year-old pub owner Lie Chang Loon (李章纶 Lĭ Zhānglún) – were arraigned in court for charges of murder (Mohamad Fitri) and abetment of murder (Lie). The remaining seven suspects were released at this point of time. Under Malaysian law, the death penalty was mandatory for murder and abetment of murder under Section 302 and Section 109 of the Penal Code respectively.

After further investigations, another three suspects were listed on the police's wanted list for alleged abetment of murdering Kayong. These three people were 45-year-old plantation owner Datuk Stephen Lee Chee Kiang (李志坚 Lǐ Zhìjiān), Lee's 50-year-old personal assistant Chin Wui Chung (陈伟忠 Chén Wěizhōng; also spelt Chin Wui Ching or Chin Wui Chong) and 35-year-old karaoke operator Koong Siang Ming (江贤明 Jiāng Xiánmíng; also spelt Kong Sien Ming; alias Batu Ming or Ah Ming).

On 18 August 2016, one of the three fugitives, Chin, surrendered himself at the Miri Police Station while accompanied by his lawyer. He was subsequently charged with abetting the murder of Kayong on 29 August 2016. Lee was suspected to have fled to Melbourne via Singapore on 3 July 2016, and Interpol received an appeal from Malaysia to search for Lee's whereabouts and arrest him. After the Australian authorities managed to track down Lee, the Malaysian authorities tried to negotiate for Lee to be extradited back to Malaysia to stand trial. However, the process itself was not possible, as the charge of abetment of murder carried the mandatory death penalty in Malaysian law, and Australia forbids the extradition of criminals to countries where they face the death penalty.

Eventually, on 12 December 2016, Lee was located in China by the Chinese authorities and deported to Malaysia, and the Royal Malaysia Police took Lee into custody for Kayong's murder. On 14 December 2016, Lee was charged in court with abetment of murder, but he pleaded not guilty to the charge. Although he was indicted at a considerably late stage compared to the first three, Lee's case was heard together with the others. Koong remained at large as of the date when Lee was charged in court.

On 30 December 2016, the case relating to the murder of Bill Kayong was transferred to the High Court.

== Murder trial (2017–2018) ==
On 5 January 2017, the four alleged perpetrators – Mohamad Fitri Pauzi, Datuk Stephen Lee Chee Kiang, Lie Chang Loon and Chin Wui Chung – stood trial for the murder of Bill Kayong at the Miri High Court.

The prosecution alleged that the first three defendants – Lee, Lie and Chin – were the masterminds of the murder and the trio had put a hit on Kayong by ordering Mohamad Fitri and the missing suspect Koong Siang Ming to kill him, supposedly over his political activities. Lee denied that he was involved in the murder, and Lie and Chin similarly denied that they had planned and made orders to assassinate Kayong. Lee's counsel alleged that his client was abducted by Malaysian authorities in China and brought back for trial, but the Malaysian police officers denied that they abducted Lee, as they told the court that Lee's passport was invalid by the time he was located and was thus repatriated to Malaysia from China, where there was no extradition treaty between China and Malaysia.

On 6 June 2017, the Miri High Court acquitted the first three accused – Lee, Lie and Chin – without calling for their defence after finding insufficient evidence against them, but the same court ruled that there was a case for Mohamad Fitri to answer and ordered him to enter his defence. The prosecution confirmed a day later that they would appeal against the acquittals of the three men.

When Mohamad Fitri took the stand to give his testimony in May 2018, he denied that he murdered Kayong by shooting. He claimed that he wanted the shotgun and ammunition for hunting purposes, and he bought the shotgun and cartridges from a man named "Tony" in Long Lama town in January 2016, roughly five months before his arrest for Kayong's murder. Mohamad Fitri said that he entrusted the shotgun and ammunition to a friend named Lau Lee Shen for safekeeping on the morning of 30 May 2016, since he did not have a valid license to own any firearms, and he later reclaimed the gun and bullets from Lau for a night hunting trip on the same date before he once again returned the gun to Lau. Mohamad Fitri stated that on the day of the murder, he was at a food stall in a coffee shop located between Jalan Sukma and Lorong Desa Senadin 2C, and he met a friend who bought a deer from him before he returned home. In rebuttal, during cross-examination, the prosecution argued that the real reason why Mohamad Fitri went to the food stall in Desa Senadin was to stalk Kayong rather than meeting a friend, and Mohamad Fitri followed Kayong to the traffic light where he used the shotgun to shoot and kill Kayong, and Mohamad Fitri denied these above contentions put forward to him by the prosecution.

On 10 August 2018, Justice Ravintharan N. Paramaguru delivered his verdict. He stated in his judgement that on the totality of physical and circumstantial evidence adduced during the trial, it was undisputed that Mohamad Fitri was responsible for the lethal shooting of Bill Kayong, and rejected Mohamad Fitri's defence. Justice Ravinthran said the prosecution had proven that Mohamad Fitri had the intention to commit the offence by testing the shotgun used in the murder in a secluded area, and he took it with the interpretation that Mohamad Fitri had elaborate planning and premeditation in committing the offence of murder. He rejected Mohamad Fitri's defence that he bought the shotgun for hunting purposes, as it would have been natural for him to go straight to legal hunting grounds rather than going to secluded areas to testfire the weapon.

As such, 31-year-old Mohamad Fitri Pauzi was found guilty of murder and sentenced to death by hanging. Mohamad Fitri was reportedly stunned to hear that he was convicted and given the death penalty during sentencing. Kayong's family and friends were present in the courtroom at the time of sentencing, and Kayong's younger brother stated that while the family found it a fair judgement to sentence Mohamad Fitri to hang for his brother's murder, his family and the public only hoped for the truth to be revealed over the motive behind his brother's murder, and he stated that his family wanted to personally witness Mohamad Fitri's execution when the day comes. It was revealed in midst of the murder trial that Kayong's family was struggling to make ends meet after he died back in 2016, and his widow was receiving financial aid from social organizations and her late husband's political party to help improve the livelihood of herself and her children.

== Appeals of Mohamad Fitri ==
Mohamad Fitri Pauzi
- Born: 4 June 1987 (age 39); Sarawak, Malaysia
- Status: Incarcerated on death row
- Conviction: Murder
- Penalty: Death

Details
- Victims: Bill Kayong (deceased)
- Date: 21 June 2016
- Country: Malaysia
- State: Sarawak
- Date apprehended: c. 1 July 2016

Two months after Mohamad Fitri was sentenced to hang, the Malaysian government announced in October 2018 that they would abolish the death penalty. This sparked a great backlash from the Malaysian public, given that the country itself was highly supportive of capital punishment and families whose loved ones fell victim to murder protested against this upcoming decision in particular. Miri Member of Parliament (MP) Dr Michael Teo Yu Keng, who was in correspondence with Bill Kayong's family, told the media in November 2018 that Kayong's family opposed to the abolition of the death sentence, as they feared that it would deliver a wrong impression that murder was not a serious offence.

On 18 February 2020, the Court of Appeal's three-judge panel, led by Justice Datuk Mary Lim Thiam Suan, dismissed Mohamad Fitri's appeal against his conviction and sentence.

On 15 March 2022, a three-member bench of the Federal Court of Malaysia, consisting of Justice Datuk Nallini Pathmanathan, Justice Datuk Vernon Ong Lam Kiat and Justice Datuk Abdul Rahman Sebli, unanimously rejected the final appeal of Mohamad Fitri, after considering the evidence as a whole and found sufficient grounds to convict Mohamad Fitri of the murder of Bill Kayong, and therefore upheld both his murder conviction and death sentence. Since the Federal Court was the highest court of the nation, the dismissal of the appeal by the Federal Court marked the final time Mohamad Fitri failed to evade the gallows.

In April 2023, a year after the loss of Mohamad Fitri's final appeal, the Malaysian government repealed the mandatory death penalty and under the revised laws, anyone convicted of murder would face either the death sentence or a lengthy jail term ranging between 30 and 40 years. More than 1,000 death row inmates in Malaysia, especially those who had exhausted all avenues of appeal, were allowed to appeal for re-sentencing and commute their death sentences. Together with other 935 death row prisoners, Mohamad Fitri had applied for a reduction of his death sentence.

On 26 September 2024, 37-year-old Mohamad Fitri's re-sentencing plea was rejected by the Federal Court. The three appellate judges – Tan Sri Abang Iskandar Abang Hashim, Datuk Seri Hasnah Datuk Mohammed Hashim and Datuk Rhodzariah Bujang – found that the murder of Bill Kayong was "carried out with extreme cruelty, sparking public outrage" and it was appropriate to sentence Mohammad Fitri to hang for the murder, which they found to be a revenge-driven act caused by alleged land disputes and Kayong's political activities, and hence, they confirmed the death penalty in Mohammad Fitri's case.

As of 2024, Mohamad Fitri Pauzi remains on death row pending execution.

== 2021 arrest of final suspect ==
In July 2021, the fifth and final suspect Koong Siang Ming was arrested in China after five years on the run, and the Chinese authorities repatriated Koong to Malaysia over the expiration of his passport.

On 16 July 2021, Koong arrived at Miri Airport on a flight from Kuala Lumpur, with the Malaysian police escorting him. Three days after he returned to Miri, Koong was detained for seven days in police custody to assist in investigations, in accordance to a court order. On 26 July 2021, Koong was released on police bail and as of 2024, no further updates were made in the investigation of his case.

After receiving news of Koong's arrest in 2021, the PKR continued to seek justice for Kayong, and they asked that Koong should be investigated and prosecuted to ensure that the case could have a full closure with justice being fully served, and urged the public to not speculate as investigations were ongoing at that point.

== Societal response and aftermath ==
When the murder of Kayong first came to light, many Sarawakians were shocked by the crime being committed in broad daylight. Many indigenous organizations called for justice to be served, and they remembered the various activities where Kayong advocated for the rights of the native tribal people residing in Sarawak. Opposition political party Amanah's secretary-general Mohd Anuar Tahir also questioned why a cold-blooded and yet "mafia-style" murder by firearm happened in broad daylight despite Malaysia's strict gun control, and also cited the rising occurrence of brutal murders related to the use of firearms in Malaysia.

After the acquittals of the first three suspects – Datuk Stephen Lee Chee Kiang, Lie Chang Loon and Chin Wui Chung – for the abetment of Kayong's killing, Amnesty International appealed for the case to be reopened, expressing their hope for justice to be served and better protection was ensured for those who fought for human rights. Protests erupted outside the Miri High Court after the three alleged masterminds were discharged and acquitted in view of weak evidence, with most of the anger being directed at Lee, who was accused of masterminding the killing of Kayong. The acquittals of the trio stirred controversy among the public, as the public and supporters of Kayong maintained that Kayong was killed due to his involvement in activism for the rights of the indigenous people and they asked that the case should be reopened to ensure that the ends of justice was fully served. PKR chairman and lawyer Baru Bian also stated that the acquittals of the trio was a "devastating blow to justice" due to them suspecting the trio for pulling the strings that led to Kayong's death. Kayong's family were also reportedly shocked and in grief over the decision.

In the aftermath of the triple acquittals, the prosecution filed an appeal against the acquittals, but on 10 April 2018, the Court of Appeal found there was no merit in the prosecution's appeal and after determining that there was little to no evidence to connect the trio to the shooting, the Court of Appeal dismissed the prosecution's appeal and cleared the trio of all charges in relation to the crime, and released them all three.

In January 2023, it was reported that Kayong's grave was vandalized and a police report was lodged to investigate the vandalism done to his tombstone.

== See also ==
- Capital punishment in Malaysia
