= Ministry of Foreign Affairs (Malaysia) =

Government ministry of Malaysia

- Kementerian Luar Negeri (KLN) كمنترين لوار نڬري; Wisma Putra
- Coat of arms of Malaysia

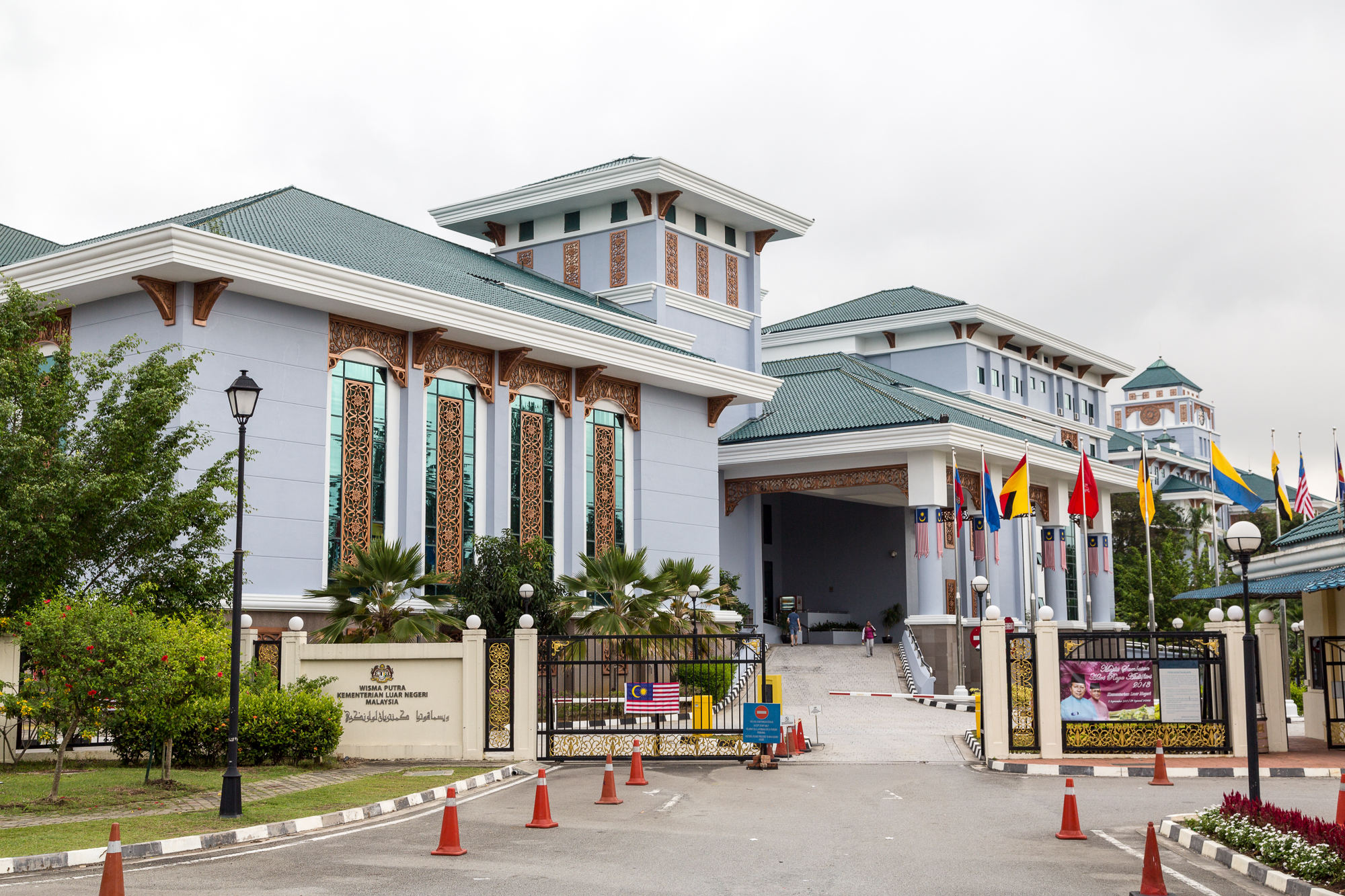

Ministry overview
- Formed: 1956; 70 years ago
- Preceding Ministry: Ministry of External Affairs
- Jurisdiction: Government of Malaysia
- Headquarters: Wisma Putra, No. 1, Jalan Wisma Putra, Precinct 2, Federal Government Administrative Centre, 62602 Putrajaya
- Employees: 3,255 (2017)
- Annual budget: MYR 1,200,844,100 (2026)
- Minister responsible: Dato' Seri Utama Haji Mohamad bin Haji Hasan, Minister of Foreign Affairs
- Deputy Minister responsible: Dato Lukanisman bin Awang Sauni, Deputy Minister of Foreign Affairs
- Ministry executives: Dato' Sri Amran bin Mohamed Zin, Secretary-General; Dato' Ahmad Rozian bin Abd. Ghani, Deputy Secretary-General (Bilateral Affairs); Vacant, Deputy Secretary-General (Multilateral Affairs); Datin Paduka Anizan Siti Hajjar binti Adnin, Deputy Secretary-General (Management Services)
- Website: www.kln.gov.my

Footnotes
- Ministry of Foreign Affairs on Facebook

The Ministry of Foreign Affairs (Malay: Kementerian Luar Negeri; Jawi: كمنترين لوار نڬري), abbreviated KLN, is a ministry of the Government of Malaysia that is responsible for foreign affairs, Malaysian diaspora, foreigners in Malaysia, diplomacy, foreign relations, counter terrorism, bilateral affairs, multilateral affairs, ASEAN, international protocol, consular services, maritime affairs, and chemical weapons. It is currently based in Putrajaya. It is also widely known as Wisma Putra, which is also the name of its building in Putrajaya.

== Organisation ==
- Minister of Foreign Affairs
  - Deputy Minister
    - Secretary-General
      - Under the Authority of Secretary-General
        - Legal Division
        - Internal Audit Unit
        - Integrity Unit
      - Deputy Secretary-General (Bilateral Affairs)
        - Europe Division
        - Americas Division
        - Africa Division
        - West Asia Division
        - East Asia Division
        - South and Central Asia Division
        - Cambodia, Laos, Myanmar and Vietnam (CLMV) and Oceania Division
        - South East Asia Division
        - Communications and Public Diplomacy Division
          - Corporate Communication Unit
      - Deputy Secretary-General (Multilateral Affairs)
        - Human Rights and Humanitarian Division
        - Organisation of Islamic Cooperation (OIC) and Regional Cooperation Division
        - Multilateral Economics and Environment Division
        - Multilateral Political Division
        - Multilateral Security and International Organizations Division
        - International Cooperation and Development Division
      - Deputy Secretary-General (Management Services)
        - Administration and Security Division
        - Human Resource Management Division
        - Finance Division
        - Development Division
        - Inspectorate Division
        - Information and Communication Technology Division
        - Account Division
      - Director-General of Asean-Malaysia National Secretariat
        - Asean Political-Security Community Division
        - Asean Economic Community Division
        - Asean Socio-Cultural Community Division
        - Asean External Relation Division
      - Chief of Protocol and Consular
        - Protocol Division
        - Consular Division
      - Director-General of Policy Planning and Coordination
        - Policy and Strategic Planning Division
        - Coordination and Performance Evaluation Division
      - Director-General of Maritime Affairs
      - Director-General of Institute of Diplomacy and Foreign Relations
      - Director-General of Southeast Asia Regional Centre for Counter-Terrorism
      - Chairman of National Authority for Chemical Weapons Convention
      - Heads of Mission (112 Missions)

=== Federal departments ===
1. Department of Bilateral Affairs, or Jabatan Hubungan Dua Hala. (Official site)
2. Department of Multilateral Affairs, or Jabatan Hubungan Pelbagai Hala. (Official site)
3. Department of Management Services, or Jabatan Pengurusan Perkhidmatan. (Official site)
4. Department of Protocol and Consular, or Jabatan Protokol dan Konsular. (Official site)
5. Department of Policy Planning and Coordination, or Jabatan Perancangan Dasar dan Strategi. (Official site)
6. Department of Maritime Affairs, or Jabatan Hal Ehwal Maritim. (Official site)

=== Federal agencies ===
1. Asean-Malaysia National Secretariat, or Sekretariat Kebangsaan Asean-Malaysia. (Official site)
2. Institute of Diplomacy and Foreign Relations (IDFR), or Institut Diplomasi dan Hubungan Luar Negeri. (Official site)
3. Southeast Asia Regional Centre for Counter-Terrorism (SEARCCT), or Pusat Serantau Asia Tenggara bagi Mencegah Keganasan. (Official site)
4. National Authority for Chemical Weapons Convention (CWC), or Pihak Berkuasa Kebangsaan Konvensyen Senjata Kimia. (Official site)

== Key legislation ==
The Ministry of Foreign Affairs is responsible for administration of several key Acts:

== History ==
The origin of the Ministry of Foreign Affairs began before Malaysia's independence in 1957. The groundwork for the establishment of the Ministry of External Affairs (MEA), as it was initially called, was initiated a year prior to Independence particularly with through the training of a batch of eleven diplomats to man the country's diplomatic missions overseas. This pioneering group was trained in the United Kingdom and Australia.

The Ministry of External Affairs was modeled after the British Foreign Office.

Initially, Malaysia had diplomatic missions in London, New York City with a concurrent office in Washington D.C., Canberra, New Delhi, Jakarta and Bangkok. In 1963, there were fourteen Malaysian missions and twenty-five countries were represented in Malaysia (four by way of concurrent accreditation).

In 1965, the diplomatic machinery of Malaysia faced its first major reorganisation. In 1966, there was an accelerated growth pattern of the Foreign Ministry particularly with regard to the personnel and the financial allocation for its activities. That year also witnessed a change in the designation of MEA to the preferred terminology of "Ministry of Foreign Affairs" and also saw the physical relocation and consolidation of the Ministry. From its original premises at the Sultan Abdul Samad Building, the Ministry moved to Wisma Putra. The Wisma Putra Complex is based on a combination of both traditional and modern architecture.

== Functions ==
The Ministry of Foreign Affairs bears the mandate and responsibility to conduct Malaysia's foreign relations with other countries. This includes matters related to political relations, economic affairs, security matters, and social and cultural promotion. The Ministry is geared towards fulfilling its role and functions:

- upholding, protecting and promoting Malaysia's sovereignty, territorial integrity and national interests;
- monitoring and analysing regional and global developments;
- developing and advising the Government on foreign policy options;
- coordinating a coherent position on international issues with other Ministries and Agencies;
- providing consular services and assistance within the limits permitted by international law;
- articulating the Government's foreign policy positions; and
- facilitating other Ministries and Agencies in their international engagement.

== Legal Framework ==
The External Affairs Legislations that fall within the purview of the Ministry of Foreign Affairs are:

- Diplomatic and Consular Officers (Oaths and Fees) Act 1959 (Revised 1988) [Act 348];
- Diplomatic Privileges (Vienna Convention) Act 1966 [Act 636];
- Consular Relations (Vienna Convention) Act 1999 [Act 595];
- Foreign Representative (Privileges and Immunities) Act 1967 (Revised 1995) [Act 541];
- International Organisations (Privileges and Immunities) Act 1992 [Act 485]; and
- Chemical Weapons Convention Act 2005 [Act 641].

In addition, the Federal Constitution allows Parliament to make laws related to external affairs that include:

- Treaties, agreements and conventions with other countries and all matters which bring the Federation into relations with any other country;
- Implementation of treaties, agreements and conventions with other countries;
- Diplomatic, consular and trade representation;
- International organisations; participation in international bodies and implementation of decisions taken thereat;
- Extradition, fugitive offenders; admission into, and emigration and expulsion from, the Federation;
- Passports, visas, permits of entry or other certificates, quarantine;
- Foreign and extraterritorial jurisdiction; and
- Pilgrimage to places outside Malaysia.

== Ministers ==
| Minister | Portrait | Office | Executive Experience |
|---|---|---|---|
| Mohamad Hasan | | Minister of Foreign Affairs | MLA for Rantau (March 2004 – current); MP for Rembau (November 2022 – current); Menteri Besar of Negeri Sembilan (March 2004 – May 2018); State Leader of the Opposition of Negeri Sembilan (July 2018 – August 2023); Minister of Defence (December 2022 – December 2025) |
| Lukanisman Awang Sauni | | Deputy Minister of Foreign Affairs | MP for Sibuti (May 2018 – current); Chairman of the Sustainable Energy Development Authority (April 2020 – December 2022); Deputy Minister of Health (December 2022 – December 2025) |

== See also ==
- Minister of Foreign Affairs (Malaysia)
- Deputy Minister of Foreign Affairs (Malaysia)
