= Miri (federal constituency) =

Federal constituency of Sarawak, Malaysia

Miri (P219)
Sarawak constituency

Federal constituency
- Legislature: Dewan Rakyat
- MP: Chiew Choon Man; PH
- Constituency created: 1987
- First contested: 1990
- Last contested: 2022

Demographics
- Population (2020): 206,125
- Electors (2022): 143,229
- Area (km²): 771
- Pop. density (per km²): 267.3

Miri is a federal constituency in Miri Division (Miri District), Sarawak, Malaysia, that has been represented in the Dewan Rakyat since 1990.

The federal constituency was created in the 1987 redistribution and is mandated to return a single member to the Dewan Rakyat under the first past the post voting system.

== Demographics ==
https://ge15.orientaldaily.com.my/seats/sarawak/p

Ethnic breakdown of Miri's electorate as of 2022
1. Chinese (47.1%)
2. Sarawak bumiputera (30.4%)
3. Malay-Muslim bumiputera (21.7%)
4. Other ethnicities (0.80%)

As of 2020, Miri has a population of 206,125 people.

Age breakdown of Miri's electorate as of 2022
1. 18-20 (6.74%)
2. 21-29 (22.6%)
3. 30-39 (21.8%)
4. 40-49 (16.6%)
5. 50-59 (14.4%)
6. 60-69 (11.2%)
7. 70-79 (4.82%)
8. 80-89 (1.46%)
9. above 90 (0.47%)
Gender breakdown of Miri's electorate as of 2022
1. Male (49.9%)
2. Female (50.1%)

== History ==
=== Polling districts ===
According to the gazette issued on 31 October 2022, the Miri constituency has a total of 14 polling districts.

State constituency	Polling Districts	Code	Location
Piasau (N73)	Kubu	219/73/01	SMK Saint Columbia
Piasau (N73)	Bazzar	219/73/02	SJK (C) Chung Hua Miri; SK Saint Joseph Miri
Piasau (N73)	Merbau	219/73/03	SK Jln. Bintang
Piasau (N73)	Merpati	219/73/04	SRA Rakyat Miri (Madrasah As-Syibyan)
Piasau (N73)	Permaisuri	219/73/05	SK South; SK Pulau Melayu
Piasau (N73)	Bintang	219/73/06	SJK (C) North
Piasau (N73)	Lutong	219/73/07	SJK (C) Chung Hua Lutong; SMK Lutong; SK Lutong
Piasau (N73)	Tanjong	219/73/08	SMJK Chung Hua
Piasau (N73)	Luak	219/73/09	SK Kpg. Luak
Pujut (N74)	Pujut	219/74/01	Tadika Miri Chinese; SR Sri Mawar; SK Anchi; Tadika Pujut Miri; SK Pujut Corner Pujut; SJK (C) Chung Hua Pujut Miri; SMK Dato Permaisuri Piassau Jaya
Pujut (N74)	Krokop	219/74/02	Kolej Vokesional Miri; SJK (C) Chung Hua Krokop; SM Pei Min; SK Miri
Senadin (N75)	Kuala Baram	219/75/01	SK Tudan; SK Senadin; SMK Pujut; Dewan Kg. Pangkalan Lutong; SK Merbau; SMK Merbau; SJK (C) Chung Hua Tuda; SK Tudan Jaya; SK Kuala Baram; SK Kuala Baram II
Senadin (N75)	Lopeng	219/75/02	SK Agama; SMK Baru; RH Dok Sg. Teniku Miri
Senadin (N75)	Riam	219/75/03	SJK (C) Chung San Riam Miri

=== Representation history ===
Members of Parliament for Miri
Parliament	No	Years	Member	Party	Vote Share
Constituency created, renamed from Lambir
8th	P178	1990-1995	Peter Chin Fah Kui (陈华贵)	BN (SUPP)	18,904; 57.51%
9th	P190	1995-1999	Peter Chin Fah Kui (陈华贵)	BN (SUPP)	23,977; 63.82%
10th	P191	1999-2004	Peter Chin Fah Kui (陈华贵)	BN (SUPP)	25,121; 63.54%
11th	P217	2004-2008	Peter Chin Fah Kui (陈华贵)	BN (SUPP)	Uncontested
12th	P219	2008-2013	Peter Chin Fah Kui (陈华贵)	BN (SUPP)	19,354; 57.79%
13th	P219	2013–2015	Michael Teo Yu Keng (张有庆)	PR (PKR)	26,909; 51.62%
13th	P219	2015–2018	Michael Teo Yu Keng (张有庆)	PH (PKR)	26,909; 51.62%
14th	P219	2018–2022	Michael Teo Yu Keng (张有庆)	PH (PKR)	35,739; 61.82%
15th	P219	2022–present	Chiew Choon Man (赵俊文)	PH (PKR)	39,549; 50.61%

=== State constituency ===
Parliamentary constituency	State constituency					
Parliamentary constituency	1969–1978	1978–1990	1990–1999	1999–2008	2008–2016	2016−present
Miri			Lambir			
Miri			Piasau			
Miri					Pujut	
Miri				Senadin		

=== Historical boundaries ===
State Constituency	Area			
State Constituency	1987	1996	2005	2015
Lambir	Bakam; Bekenu; Kuala Nyalau; Lambir; Niah	Bakam; Bekenu; Lambir; Niah; Sibuti		
Piasau	Kuala Baram; Krokop; Lopeng; Miri; Sungai Tujuh	Krokop; Lopeng; Miri; Piasau; Pujut	Kampung Haji Wahed; Kampung Lereng Bukit; Kampung Tulang; Lutong; Miri	Kampung Lusut; Luak; Lutong; Miri; Tanjung Lobang
Pujut			Jalan Bulan Sabit; Kampung Sungai Baong; Krokop; Piasau; Pujut	Kampung Sungai Baong; Krokop; Padang Kerbau; Piasau; Pujut
Senadin		Kuala Baram; Luak; Lopeng; Permyjaya; Riam		Kuala Baram; Lopeng; Permyjaya; Riam; Senadin

=== Current state assembly members ===
No.	State Constituency	Member	Party (coalition)
N73	Piasau	Sebastian Ting Chiew Yew	GPS (SUPP)
N74	Pujut	Adam Yii Siew Siang	GPS (SUPP)
N75	Senadin	Lee Kim Shin	GPS (SUPP)

=== Local governments & postcodes ===
No.	State Constituency	Local Government	Postcode
N73	Piasau	Miri City Council	98000 Miri; 98100 Lutong
N74	Pujut	Miri City Council	98000 Miri; 98100 Lutong
N75	Senadin	Miri City Council	98000 Miri; 98100 Lutong

== Election results ==
Malaysian general election, 2022
Party	Candidate	Votes	%	∆%
PH	Chiew Choon Man	39,549	50.61	▲50.61
GPS	Jeffery Phang Siaw Foong	33,390	42.73	▲42.73
PSB	Lawrence Lai	5,209	6.67	▲6.67
Total valid votes		78,148	100.00	
Total rejected ballots		620		
Unreturned ballots		228		
Turnout		78,996	54.56	▼18.14
Registered electors		143,229		
Majority		6,159	7.88	▼15.75
PH hold		Swing		
Source(s) https://lom.agc.gov.my/ilims/upload/portal/akta/outputp/1753265/PARLIMEN%20SARAWAK%20(PUB%20620).pdf

Malaysian general election, 2018
Party	Candidate	Votes	%	∆%
PKR	Michael Teo Yu Keng	35,739	61.82	▲10.20
BN	Sebastian Ting Chiew Yew	22,076	38.18	▼9.62
Total valid votes		57,815	100.00	
Total rejected ballots		513		
Unreturned ballots		111		
Turnout		58,439	72.70	▼1.51
Registered electors		80,386		
Majority		13,663	23.63	▲19.81
PKR hold		Swing		
Source(s) "His Majesty's Government Gazette - Notice of Contested Election, Parliament for the State of Sarawak [P.U. (B) 247/2018]" (PDF). Attorney General's Chambers of Malaysia. 3 May 2018. "Federal Government Gazette - Results of Contested Election and Statements of the Poll after the Official Addition of Votes, Parliamentary Constituencies for the State of Sarawak [P.U. (B) 321/2018]" (PDF). Attorney General's Chambers of Malaysia. 28 May 2018. Archived from the original (PDF) on 29 December 2019.

Malaysian general election, 2013
Party	Candidate	Votes	%	∆%
PKR	Michael Teo Yu Keng	26,909	51.62	▲51.62
BN	Sebastian Ting Chiew Yew	24,917	47.80	▼9.99
STAR	Chong Kon Fatt	306	0.59	▲0.59
Total valid votes		52,132	100.00	
Total rejected ballots		630		
Unreturned ballots		51		
Turnout		52,813	74.21	▲13.51
Registered electors		71,170		
Majority		1,992	3.82	▼11.76
PKR gain from BN		Swing		?
Source(s) "Federal Government Gazette - Notice of Contested Election, Parliament for the State of Sarawak [P.U. (B) 184/2013]" (PDF). Attorney General's Chambers of Malaysia. 26 April 2013. Archived from the original (PDF) on 30 September 2018. "Federal Government Gazette - Results of Contested Election and Statements of the Poll after the Official Addition of Votes, Parliamentary Constituencies for the State of Sarawak [P.U. (B) 225/2013]" (PDF). Attorney General's Chambers of Malaysia. 22 May 2013. Archived from the original (PDF) on 30 September 2018.

Malaysian general election, 2008
Party	Candidate	Votes	%	∆%
BN	Peter Chin Fah Kui	19,354	57.79	▲57.79
DAP	Fong Pau Teck	14,138	42.21	▲42.21
Total valid votes		33,492	100.00	
Total rejected ballots		273		
Unreturned ballots		204		
Turnout		33,969	60.70	
Registered electors		55,963		
Majority		5,216	15.58	
BN hold		Swing		

Malaysian general election, 2004
Party	Candidate	Votes	%	∆%
On the nomination day, Peter Chin Fah Kui won uncontested.
BN	Peter Chin Fah Kui			
Total valid votes			100.00	
Total rejected ballots				
Unreturned ballots				
Turnout				
Registered electors		74,266		
Majority				
BN hold		Swing		

Malaysian general election, 1999
Party	Candidate	Votes	%	∆%
BN	Peter Chin Fah Kui	25,121	63.54	▼0.28
DAP	Yie Siew Kee	14,415	36.46	▲36.46
Total valid votes		39,536	100.00	
Total rejected ballots		482		
Unreturned ballots		421		
Turnout		40,439	59.20	▼0.68
Registered electors		68,305		
Majority		10,706	27.08	▼0.56
BN hold		Swing		

Malaysian general election, 1995
Party	Candidate	Votes	%	∆%
BN	Peter Chin Fah Kui	23,977	63.82	▲6.31
DAP	Chong Kon Fatt	13,592	36.18	▲3.56
Total valid votes		37,569	100.00	
Total rejected ballots		805		
Unreturned ballots		206		
Turnout		38,580	59.88	▼2.72
Registered electors		64,430		
Majority		10,385	27.64	▲2.75
BN hold		Swing		

Malaysian general election, 1990
Party	Candidate	Votes	%
BN	Peter Chin Fah Kui	18,904	57.51
DAP	Lo Yung Tee	10,723	32.62
PERMAS	Sarbini Morni	3,242	9.86
Total valid votes		32,869	100.00
Total rejected ballots		377	
Unreturned ballots		0	
Turnout		33,246	62.60
Registered electors		53,111	
Majority		8,181	24.89
This was a new constituency created.
