= Lambir =

Lambir may refer to:

- Lambir (federal constituency), formerly represented in the Dewan Rakyat (1978–90)
- Lambir (state constituency), represented in the Sarawak State Legislative Assembly
