= Sibuti =

Federal constituency of Sarawak, Malaysia

Sibuti (P218)
Sarawak constituency

Federal constituency
- Legislature: Dewan Rakyat
- MP: Lukanisman Awang Sauni; GPS
- Constituency created: 2005
- First contested: 2008
- Last contested: 2022

Demographics
- Population (2020): 70,984
- Electors (2022): 58,522
- Area (km²): 1,576
- Pop. density (per km²): 45

Sibuti is a federal constituency in Miri Division (Miri District and Subis District), Sarawak, Malaysia, that has been represented in the Dewan Rakyat since 2008.

The federal constituency was created in the 2005 redistribution and is mandated to return a single member to the Dewan Rakyat under the first past the post voting system.

== Demographics ==
https://ge15.orientaldaily.com.my/seats/sarawak/p

Ethnic breakdown of Sibuti's electorate as of 2022
1. Sarawak bumiputera (47.5%)
2. Malay-Muslim bumiputera (28.2%)
3. Chinese (23.6%)
4. Other ethnicities (0.70%)

As of 2020, Sibuti has a population of 70,984 people.

Age breakdown of Sibuti's electorate as of 2022
1. 18-20 (6.91%)
2. 21-29 (23.9%)
3. 30-39 (23.4%)
4. 40-49 (16.3%)
5. 50-59 (13.2%)
6. 60-69 (10.2%)
7. 70-79 (4.47%)
8. 80-89 (1.10%)
9. above 90 (0.32%)
Gender breakdown of Sibuti's electorate as of 2022
1. Male (51.5%)
2. Female (48.5%)

== History ==
=== Polling districts ===
According to the gazette issued on 31 October 2022, the Sibuti constituency has a total of 16 polling districts.

State constituency	Polling Districts	Code	Location
Bekenu（N71）	Batu Niah	218/71/01	SJK (C) Chee Mung Niah
Bekenu（N71）	Niah	218/47/02	SK Rancangan Sepupok Sebatu Niah; Dewan Masyarakat Sepupok; SK Kpg. Tarikan Kuala Niah; SK Kita Niah
Bekenu（N71）	Saeh	218/71/03	SK RH Mantali; SK Sg. Saeh Niah; Balai Raya RH Daud; SK Kpg. Tg. Belipat; SK Tanggap Niah
Bekenu（N71）	Kelulit	218/71/04	Balai Raya Kuala Sibuti; SK Beliau Isa Sibuti
Bekenu（N71）	Tiris	218/71/05	SK Beliau Ahad Sibuti; SJK (C) Chung Hua Lumut Sibuti
Bekenu（N71）	Bungai	218/71/06	SK Kpg. Abgus Sibuti; SK Kpg. Bungai Sibuti; Dewan Kampung Menjelin; Balai Raya Kpg. Selanyau
Bekenu（N71）	Bekanu	218/71/07	SK Kpg. Bulau Sibuti; SJK (C) Chung Hua Bekenu
Bekenu（N71）	Bakas	218/71/08	SK RH Tinggi Pakut, Sibuti; SK Sg. Bakas Sibuti; SK RH Esaau; SK Kelapa Sawit No. 4 Ladang Tiga
Bekenu（N71）	Hulu Sibuti	218/71/09	SK RH Barat
Lambir (N72)	Peninjau	218/72/01	SMK Luar Bandar Bekenu Sibuti; RH Duat Sg. Kelintang; RH James Biri; Dewan Pusat Pembangunan Kemahiran Sarawak (PPKS); SK Kelapa Sawit No. 2 Bukit Peninjau; RH Lagan
Lambir (N72)	Satap	218/72/02	SK Keluru Tengah Sibuti; SK Tawakal Satap Sibuti
Lambir (N72)	Bakam	218/72/03	SJK (C) Chung Hua Sg. Rakit Bakam; SK Kpg. Bakam Miri; SJK (C) Tukau
Lambir (N72)	Lambir	218/72/04	SK Lambir Village Miri
Lambir (N72)	Airport	218/72/05	SMK Riam Taman Tunku Miri; SMK Taman Tunku
Lambir (N72)	Tukau	218/72/06	SMK Agama
Lambir (N72)	RAMD	218/72/07	SMK Riam

=== Representation history ===
Members of Parliament for Sibuti
Parliament	No	Years	Member	Party	Vote Share
Constituency created from Miri and Baram
12th	P218	2008-2013	Ahmad Lai Bujang (أحمد لاي بوجڠ)	BN (PBB)	8,238; 64.22%
13th	P218	2013-2018	Ahmad Lai Bujang (أحمد لاي بوجڠ)	BN (PBB)	13,349; 64.70%
14th	P218	2018	Lukanisman Awang Sauni (لوكنيسمان أواڠ ساوني)	BN (PBB)	12,214; 54.60%
14th	P218	2018-2022	Lukanisman Awang Sauni (لوكنيسمان أواڠ ساوني)	GPS (PBB)	12,214; 54.60%
15th	P218	2022–present	Lukanisman Awang Sauni (لوكنيسمان أواڠ ساوني)	GPS (PBB)	22,150; 65.31%

=== State constituency ===
Parliamentary constituency	State constituency					
Parliamentary constituency	1969–1978	1978–1990	1990–1999	1999–2008	2008–2016	2016−present
Sibuti					Bekenu	
Sibuti					Lambir	

=== Historical boundaries ===
State Consitutency	Area	
State Consitutency	2005	2015
Bekenu	Bekenu; Kelulit; Niah; Tris; Sibuti	
Lambir	Bakam; Kampung Bukit Jugus; Kampung Lusut Jaya; Kampung Sungai Liam; Lambir	

=== Current state assembly members ===
No.	State Constituency	Member	Coalition (Party)
N71	Bekenu	Rosey Yunus	GPS (PBB)
N72	Lambir	Ripin Lamat	GPS (PBB)

=== Local governments & postcodes ===
No.	State Constituency	Local Government	Postcode
N71	Bekenu	Miri City Council (Kelulit area); Subis District Council	98000 Miri; 98150 Bekenu; 98200 Niah
N72	Lambir	Miri City Council (Taman Tunku and Lambir areas); Subis District Council	98000 Miri; 98150 Bekenu; 98200 Niah

== Election results ==
Malaysian general election, 2022: Sibuti
Party	Candidate	Votes	%	∆%
GPS	Lukanisman Awang Sauni	22,150	65.31	▲65.31
PH	Zolhaidah Suboh	10,405	30.68	▲30.68
PBDS Baru	Bobby William	1,361	4.01	▲4.01
Total valid votes		33,916	100.00	
Total rejected ballots		368		
Unreturned ballots		87		
Turnout		34,371	57.95	▼13.27
Registered electors		58,522		
Majority		11,745	34.63	▲18.20
GPS gain from BN		Swing		?
Source(s) https://lom.agc.gov.my/ilims/upload/portal/akta/outputp/1753265/PARLIMEN%20SARAWAK%20(PUB%20620).pdf

Malaysian general election, 2018: Sibuti
Party	Candidate	Votes	%	∆%
BN	Lukanisman Awang Sauni	12,214	54.60	▼10.10
PKR	Jemat Panjang	8,538	38.17	▲38.17
PAS	Zulaihi Bakar	1,617	7.23	▼28.07
Total valid votes		22,369	100.00	
Total rejected ballots		284		
Unreturned ballots		44		
Turnout		22,697	71.22	▼2.66
Registered electors		31,868		
Majority		3,676	16.43	▼12.97
BN hold		Swing		

Malaysian general election, 2013: Sibuti
Party	Candidate	Votes	%	∆%
BN	Ahmad Lai Bujang	13,348	64.70	▲0.48
PAS	Robby Zaid Tandang	7,282	35.30	▲35.30
Total valid votes		20,630	100.00	
Total rejected ballots		288		
Unreturned ballots		29		
Turnout		20,947	73.88	▲15.04
Registered electors		28,351		
Majority		6,066	29.40	▲0.96
BN hold		Swing		
Source(s) "Federal Government Gazette - Notice of Contested Election, Parliament for the State of Sarawak [P.U. (B) 184/2013]" (PDF). Attorney General's Chambers of Malaysia. 26 April 2013. "Federal Government Gazette - Results of Contested Election and Statements of the Poll after the Official Addition of Votes, Parliamentary Constituencies for the State of Sarawak [P.U. (B) 225/2013]" (PDF). Attorney General's Chambers of Malaysia. 22 May 2013.

Malaysian general election, 2008: Sibuti
Party	Candidate	Votes	%
BN	Ahmad Lai Bujang	8,238	64.22
PKR	Michael Teo Yu Keng	4,590	35.78
Total valid votes		12,828	100.00
Total rejected ballots		192	
Unreturned ballots		10	
Turnout		13,030	58.84
Registered electors		22,143	
Majority		3,648	28.44
This was a new constituency created.
