= Wisma Putra =

Government building in Putrajaya, Malaysia

Coordinates: 2°55′34″N 101°41′35″E

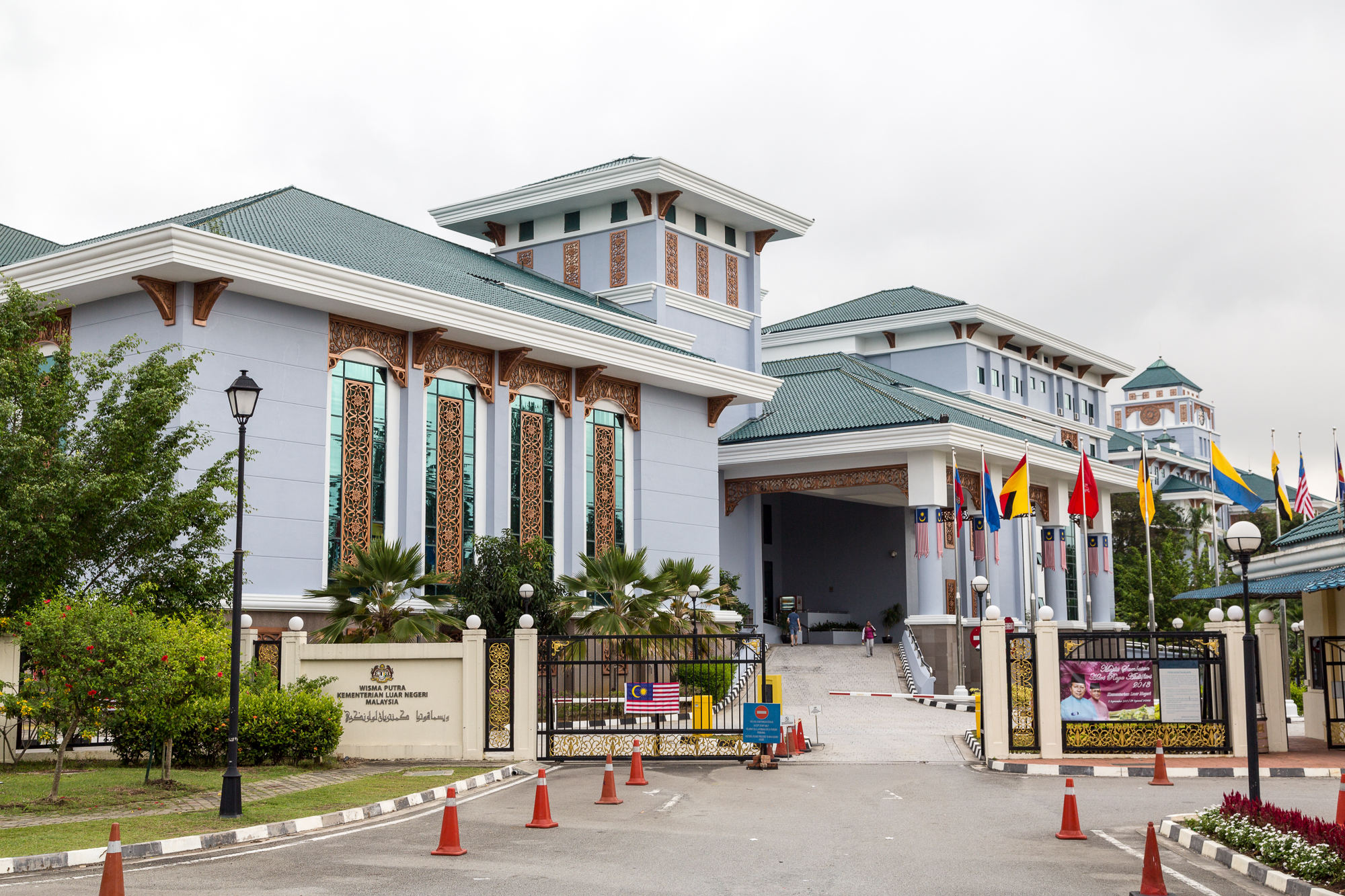
Wisma Putra

Wisma Putra is a metonym for the Malaysian Ministry of Foreign Affairs. It is also the name of the RM170 million Ministry of Foreign Affairs complex located at the country's administrative capital, Putrajaya.

The name Wisma Putra was given to the original Ministry of Foreign Affairs building in Jalan Wisma Putra, Kuala Lumpur back in 1966. The name "Putra" was given in honor of Malaysia's father of Independence, Tunku Abdul Rahman Putra Al-Haj, since the Ministry stood on the site of the official residence of the Chief Minister of the Federation of Malaya. On 1 February 2001, Prime Minister Mahathir Mohamad officially announced Putrajaya as Malaysia's third federal territory, and the entire Ministry moved to Putrajaya on 17 September 2001.

When the Ministry eventually moved to a bigger complex in Putrajaya, it carried the name Wisma Putra to Putrajaya.
