= Chiew Choon Man =

Malaysian politician and lawyer

Yang Berhormat Tuan Chiew Choon Man MP
- 赵俊文

Deputy Minister of Tourism, Arts and Culture
- Incumbent
- Assumed office 17 December 2025
- Monarch: Ibrahim Iskandar
- Prime Minister: Anwar Ibrahim
- Minister: Tiong King Sing
- Preceded by: Khairul Firdaus Akbar Khan
- Constituency: Miri

Member of the Malaysian Parliament for Miri
- Incumbent
- Assumed office 19 November 2022
- Preceded by: Michael Teo Yu Keng (PH–PKR)
- Majority: 6,159 (2022)

Vice Youth Chief of the People's Justice Party
- Incumbent
- Assumed office 24 May 2025 Serving with: Muhammad Nabil Halimi &; Mohammed Taufiq Johari &; Pravin Murali &; Nadia Fathin Syahira
- Youth Chief: Muhammad Kamil Abdul Munim
- Preceded by: Pransanth Kumar Brakasam

Personal details
- Born: Chiew Choon Man; 1991 (age 34–35) Miri, Sarawak, Malaysia
- Citizenship: Malaysia
- Party: People's Justice Party (PKR)
- Other political affiliations: Pakatan Harapan (PH)
- Spouse: (卢贝雯) (m. 2023)
- Education: Universiti Utara Malaysia (LLB); University of Malaya (LLM)
- Occupation: Politician
- Profession: Lawyer

Chiew Choon Man (born 1991) is a Malaysian politician and lawyer who has served as the Member of Parliament (MP) for Miri since November 2022 and the Deputy Minister of Tourism, Arts and Culture since December 2025. He is a member and one of the Vice Youth Chiefs of the People's Justice Party (PKR), a component party of the Pakatan Harapan (PH) coalition.

== Election results ==
Parliament of Malaysia
Year	Constituency	Candidate	Votes	Pct	Opponent(s)	Votes	Pct	Ballots cast	Majority	Turnout
2022	P219 Miri	Chiew Choon Man (PKR)	39,549	50.61%	Jeffery Phang Siaw Foong (SUPP)	33,390	42.73%	78,148	6,159	54.56%
2022	P219 Miri	Chiew Choon Man (PKR)	39,549	50.61%	Lawrence Lai (PSB)	5,209	6.67%	78,148	6,159	54.56%

== Honours ==
=== Honours of Malaysia ===
- Malaysia
  - Recipient of the 17th Yang di-Pertuan Agong Installation Medal (2025)
