= Ahmad Lai Bujang =

Malaysian politician (1949–2019)

Yang Berbahagia Datuk Ahmad Lai Bujang PJN PSBS PBS ABS
- أحمد لاي بوجڠ

Member of the Malaysian Parliament for Sibuti
- In office 8 March 2008 – 9 May 2018
- Preceded by: Position established
- Succeeded by: Lukanisman Awang Sauni (BN–PBB)
- Majority: 3,648 (2008); 6,066 (2013)

Faction represented in Dewan Rakyat
- 2008–2018: Barisan Nasional

Personal details
- Born: 26 November 1949 Crown Colony of Sarawak (now Sarawak, Malaysia)
- Died: 9 August 2019 (aged 69) National Heart Institute, Kuala Lumpur, Malaysia
- Party: Parti Pesaka Bumiputera Bersatu (PBB)
- Other political affiliations: Barisan Nasional (BN) (until 2018); Gabungan Parti Sarawak (GPS) (2018–2019)
- Occupation: Politician

Ahmad Lai bin Bujang (26 November 1949 – 9 August 2019) was a Malaysian politician who had served as the Member of Parliament (MP) for Sibuti from March 2008 to May 2018. He was a member of the Parti Pesaka Bumiputera Bersatu (PBB), a component party of the Gabungan Parti Sarawak (GPS) and formerly the Barisan Nasional (BN) coalitions.

Ahmad Lai was elected to Parliament in the 2008 general election as the Sibuti MP, defeating Michael Teo Yu Keng of Pakatan Rakyat (PR). Prior to his election as an MP, he was the Political Secretary to the Chief Minister of Sarawak Abdul Taib Mahmud. He was reelected in the 2013 general election. He declined to seek for reelection in the 2018 general election for health reasons.

== Death ==
On 9 August 2019, Ahmad Lai died at the National Heart Institute, Kuala Lumpur at the age of 69.

== Election results ==
Parliament of Malaysia
Year	Constituency	Candidate	Votes	Pct	Opponent(s)	Votes	Pct	Ballots cast	Majority	Turnout
2008	P218 Sibuti	Ahmad Lai Bujang (PBB)	8,238	64.22%	Michael Teo Yu Keng (PKR)	4,590	35.78%	13,030	3,648	58.84%
2013	P218 Sibuti	Ahmad Lai Bujang (PBB)	13,348	64.70%	Muhammad Zaid Tandang (PAS)	7,282	35.30%	20,918	6,066	73.78%

== Honours ==
=== Honours of Malaysia ===
- Malaysia
  - Commander of the Order of Meritorious Service (PJN) – Datuk (2017)
- Sarawak
  - Commander of the Most Exalted Order of the Star of Sarawak (PSBS) – Dato (2017)
  - Officer of the Most Exalted Order of the Star of Sarawak (PBS) (2009)
  - Member of the Most Exalted Order of the Star of Sarawak (ABS) (2006)
