= Michael Teo Yu Keng =

Malaysian politician

- 张有庆

Vice President of the People's Justice Party
- In office 19 June 2020 – 17 July 2022 Serving with Xavier Jayakumar Arulanandam (2020–2021) & Rafizi Ramli (2020–2022) & Chua Tian Chang (2020–2022) & Chang Lih Kang (2020–2022)
- President: Anwar Ibrahim
- Preceded by: Ali Biju
- Succeeded by: Awang Husaini Sahari

Member of the Malaysian Parliament for Miri
- In office 5 May 2013 – 19 November 2022
- Preceded by: Peter Chin Fah Kui (BN–SUPP)
- Succeeded by: Chiew Choon Man (PH–PKR)
- Majority: 1,992 (2013); 13,663 (2018)

Personal details
- Born: Teo Yu Keng
- Citizenship: Malaysian
- Party: National Justice Party (keADILan) (1999–2003); People's Justice Party (PKR) (since 2003)
- Other political affiliations: Barisan Alternatif (BA) (1999–2004); Pakatan Rakyat (PR) (2008–2015); Pakatan Harapan (PH) (since 2015)
- Occupation: Gynaecologist; Politician
- Profession: Gynaecologist

Michael Teo Yu Keng (simplified Chinese: 张有庆; traditional Chinese: 張有慶; pinyin: Zhāng Yǒuqìng; Pe̍h-ōe-jī: Tioⁿ Iú-khèng) is a Malaysian politician and gynaecologist who served as the Member of Parliament (MP) for Miri from May 2013 to November 2022. He is a member of the People's Justice Party (PKR), a component party of the Pakatan Harapan (PH) and formerly Pakatan Rakyat (PR) coalitions. He also served as the Vice President of PKR from June 2020 to July 2022. He is also a practicing gynaecologist at Teo's Clinic and Maternity Centre.

== Political career ==
Teo entered the political arena as one of the pioneering members of PKR's Sarawak branch in 1999. He went on to contest in his maiden election at the 2001 Sarawak state election in September that year for the seat of Senadin against the incumbent, Lee Kim Shin from the Sarawak United People's Party (SUPP) in a losing effort.

In March 2008, Teo contested in the 2008 Malaysian general election, making his first attempt for the newly created parliamentary seat of Sibuti. He was unsuccessful in his campaign against Ahmad Lai Bujang from the Parti Pesaka Bumiputera Bersatu (PBB).

A decade after first contesting for the Senadin state seat, Teo entered the 2011 Sarawak state election as a candidate for the same seat, once again running against SUPP's three-term incumbent, Lee. Teo again lost out to Lee, but with a razor thin majority of just 58 votes.

Teo registered to contest for the Miri parliamentary seat in the 2013 Malaysian general election on April 20, 2013. Teo defeated SUPP's secretary-general, Sebastian Ting Chiew Yew, in a three-corner fight to become a first-time MP.

Teo was announced as PKR's and the Alliance of Hope's (PH) candidate to defend the Miri parliamentary seat in the 2018 Malaysian general election on April 14, 2018. Despite Miri being one of the targeted seats for SUPP to re-capture, Teo emphatically retained his seat with an increased majority. Later in July 2018, Teo was re-elected unopposed as chairperson of PKR's Miri branch.

In March 2020, Teo ran unsuccessfully for the chairman-ship of PKR's Sarawak state liaison committee. The new chairperson, Julau MP, Larry Sng Wei Shien, appointed Teo as one of three vice-chairmen instead. In June 2020, Teo was appointed by Port Dickson MP and PKR president Anwar Ibrahim as a PKR vice-president (representing Sabah and Sarawak) to replace Lubok Antu MP Jugah Muyang (who himself was appointed to replace another defector, Saratok MP Ali Biju) who defected from the party during the 2020 Malaysian political crisis.

== Election results ==
Parliament of Malaysia
Year	Constituency	Candidate	Votes	Pct	Opponent(s)	Votes	Pct	Ballots cast	Majority	Turnout
2008	P218 Sibuti	Michael Teo Yu Keng (PKR)	4,590	35.78%	Ahmad Lai Bujang (PBB)	8,238	64.22%	13,030	3,648	58.84%
2013	P219 Miri	Michael Teo Yu Keng (PKR)	26,909	51.62%	Sebastian Ting Chiew Yew (SUPP)	24,917	47.80%	52,132	1,992	74.21%
2013	P219 Miri	Michael Teo Yu Keng (PKR)	26,909	51.62%	Chong Kon Fatt (STAR)	306	0.59%	52,132	1,992	74.21%
2018	P219 Miri	Michael Teo Yu Keng (PKR)	35,739	61.82%	Sebastian Ting Chiew Yew (SUPP)	22,076	38.18%	58,439	13,663	72.70%

Sarawak State Legislative Assembly
Year	Constituency	Candidate	Votes	Pct	Opponent(s)	Votes	Pct	Ballots cast	Majority	Turnout
2001	N65 Senadin	Michael Teo Yu Keng (keADILan)	3,905	22.96%	Lee Kim Shin (SUPP)	13,104	77.04%	17,490	9,199	62.17%
2011	N65 Senadin	Michael Teo Yu Keng (PKR)	7,276	49.80%	Lee Kim Shin (SUPP)	7,334	50.20%	14,816	58	66.05%
