= Peter Chin Fah Kui =

Malaysian politician

Yang Berbahagia Tan Sri Dato' Sri Peter Chin Fah Kui PSM SSAP PGBK PBS
- 陈华贵
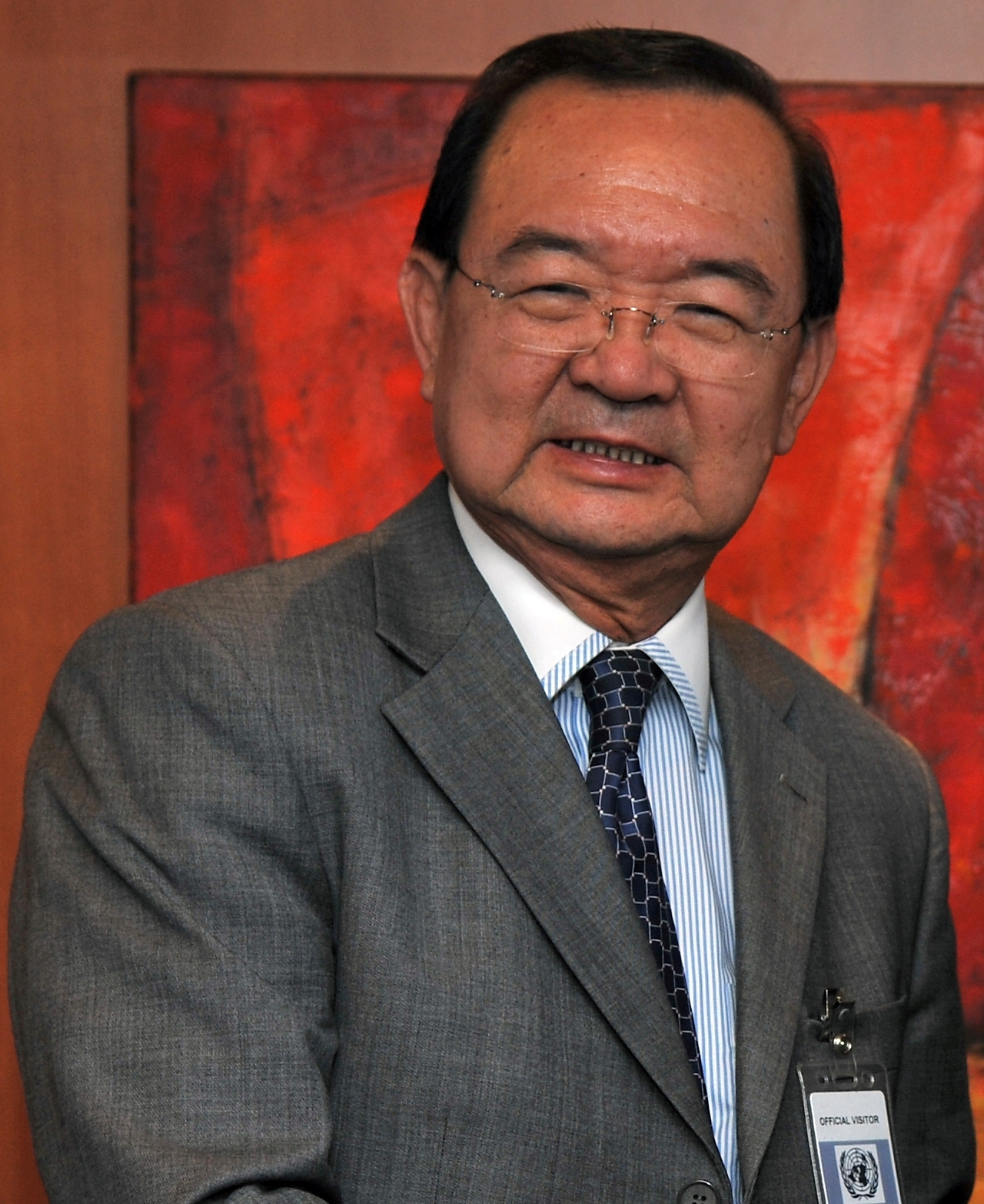
- Peter Chin in 2011

Minister of Energy, Green Technology and Water
- In office 10 April 2009 – 15 May 2013
- Monarchs: Mizan Zainal Abidin; Abdul Halim
- Prime Minister: Najib Razak
- Deputy: Noriah Kasnon
- Preceded by: Shaziman Abu Mansor as Minister of Energy, Water and Communications
- Succeeded by: Maximus Ongkili
- Constituency: Miri

Minister of Plantation Industries and Commodities
- In office 27 March 2004 – 9 April 2009
- Monarchs: Sirajuddin; Mizan Zainal Abidin
- Prime Minister: Abdullah Ahmad Badawi
- Deputy: Anifah Aman (2004–2008); A. Kohillan Pillay (2008–2009)
- Preceded by: Lim Keng Yaik as Minister of Primary Industries
- Succeeded by: Bernard Giluk Dompok
- Constituency: Miri

Deputy Minister of Housing and Local Government
- In office 8 May 1995 – 26 March 2004 Serving with Tajol Rosli Mohd Ghazali (1995–1999); M. Kayveas (2001–2003)
- Monarchs: Ja'afar; Salahuddin; Sirajuddin
- Prime Minister: Mahathir Mohamad; Abdullah Ahmad Badawi
- Minister: Ting Chew Peh (1995–1999); Ong Ka Ting (1999–2004)
- Preceded by: Jeffery Kitingan
- Succeeded by: Azizah Mohd Dun
- Constituency: Miri

Deputy Minister of Science, Technology and Environment
- In office 27 October 1990 – 7 May 1995
- Monarchs: Azlan Shah; Ja'afar
- Prime Minister: Mahathir Mohamad
- Minister: Law Hieng Ding
- Preceded by: Law Hieng Ding
- Succeeded by: Abu Bakar Daud
- Constituency: Miri

President of Sarawak United Peoples' Party
- In office 11 December 2011 – 9 September 2014
- Deputy: Richard Riot Jaem
- Preceded by: George Chan Hong Nam
- Succeeded by: Sim Kui Hian
- Constituency: Miri

Member of the Malaysian Parliament for Miri
- In office 21 October 1990 – 5 May 2013
- Preceded by: Constituency established
- Succeeded by: Michael Teo Yu Keng (PKR)
- Majority: 5,553 (1986); 8,181 (1990); 10,385 (1995); 10,706 (1999) uncontested (2004); 5,216 (2008)

Personal details
- Born: 31 August 1945 (age 81) Kuching, British Military Administration (Borneo) (now Sarawak, Malaysia)
- Party: Sarawak United People's Party (SUPP)
- Other political affiliations: Barisan Nasional (BN)
- Spouse: Ruby Wee Hui Kiang (黄惠娟)
- Children: 3
- Education: Gray's Inn
- Occupation: Politician
- Profession: Barrister
- Website: peterchin.my

Peter Chin Fah Kui (simplified Chinese: 陈华贵; traditional Chinese: 陳華貴; pinyin: Chén Huáguì; Pe̍h-ōe-jī: Tân Huâ-kuì; born 31 August 1945) is a former Malaysian politician. He was the Member of Parliament for Miri from 1985 to 2013 and served from 2004 to 2013 as a minister in the federal cabinet. From 2011 to 2014 he was the president of the Sarawak United Peoples' Party (SUPP). He is a Malaysian Chinese and of Hakka descent.

== Early life ==
Chin was born in Kuching, Sarawak. He is married to Puan Sri Ruby Wee Hui Kiang, with whom he has two daughters and one son. He was educated as a barrister-at-law at Gray's Inn, London in 1971.

Chin returned to Sarawak and joined the law firm, M/s Wan Ullok, Jugah & Chin and started his law practice in Miri, Sarawak, in 1972. Tan Sri Peter Chin was the chairman for Miri Municipal Council in 1984. He retired as a partner of the law firm upon his appointment as the parliamentary secretary to the Federal Ministry of Welfare in 1986.

== Political career ==
He has been the Member of Parliament of Miri in Malaysia since 1985 and he was the party organising secretary of the Sarawak United People's Party (SUPP).

In 2004, he was appointed to the Cabinet of Malaysia as the minister of plantation industries and commodities. Prior to his full ministerial appointment, his previous posts were deputy minister of housing and local government and deputy minister of science, technology and environment.

On 10 April 2009, Chin was appointed as the minister of energy, green technology and water.

In 2011 he became the president of SUPP. He retired from Parliament in 2013, and stood down as SUPP's president in 2014.

== Election results ==
Parliament of Malaysia
Year	Constituency	Candidate	Votes	Pct	Opponent(s)	Votes	Pct	Ballots cast	Majority	Turnout
1986	P175 Lambir	Peter Chin Fah Kui (SUPP)	15,933	55.01%	Wong Ho Leng (DAP)	10,380	35.84%	29,486	5,553	60.06%
1986	P175 Lambir	Peter Chin Fah Kui (SUPP)	15,933	55.01%	Abang Ismail Abang Peel (IND)	2,651	9.15%	29,486	5,553	60.06%
1990	P178 Miri	Peter Chin Fah Kui (SUPP)	18,904	57.51%	Lo Yung Tee (DAP)	10,723	32.62%	33,246	8,181	62.60%
1990	P178 Miri	Peter Chin Fah Kui (SUPP)	18,904	57.51%	Sarbini Morni (PERMAS)	3,242	9.86%	33,246	8,181	62.60%
1995	P190 Miri	Peter Chin Fah Kui (SUPP)	23,977	63.82%	Chong Kon Fatt (DAP)	13,592	36.18%	38,580	10,385	59.88%
1999	P191 Miri	Peter Chin Fah Kui (SUPP)	25,121	63.54%	Yee Chai Yit (DAP)	14,415	36.46%	40,439	10,706	59.20%
2004	P217 Miri	Peter Chin Fah Kui (SUPP)	Unopposed							
2008	P219 Miri	Peter Chin Fah Kui (SUPP)	19,354	57.79%	Fong Pau Teck (DAP)	14,138	42.21%	33,969	5,216	60.70%

== Honours ==
=== Honours of Malaysia ===
- Malaysia
  - Commander of the Order of Loyalty to the Crown of Malaysia (PSM) – Tan Sri (2013)
- Pahang
  - Grand Knight of the Order of Sultan Ahmad Shah of Pahang (SSAP) – Dato' Sri (2009)
- Sarawak
  - Commander of the Order of the Star of Hornbill Sarawak (PGBK) – Datuk (1998)
  - Officer of the Most Exalted Order of the Star of Sarawak (PBS) (1989)
  - Gold Medal of the Sarawak Independence Diamond Jubilee Medal (2023)

== See also ==
- Miri (federal constituency)
