= Lee Kim Shin =

Malaysian politician (born 1950)

Yang Berhormat Dato Sri Lee Kim Shin PNBS PJN KMN PBS PPB MLA
- 李景胜
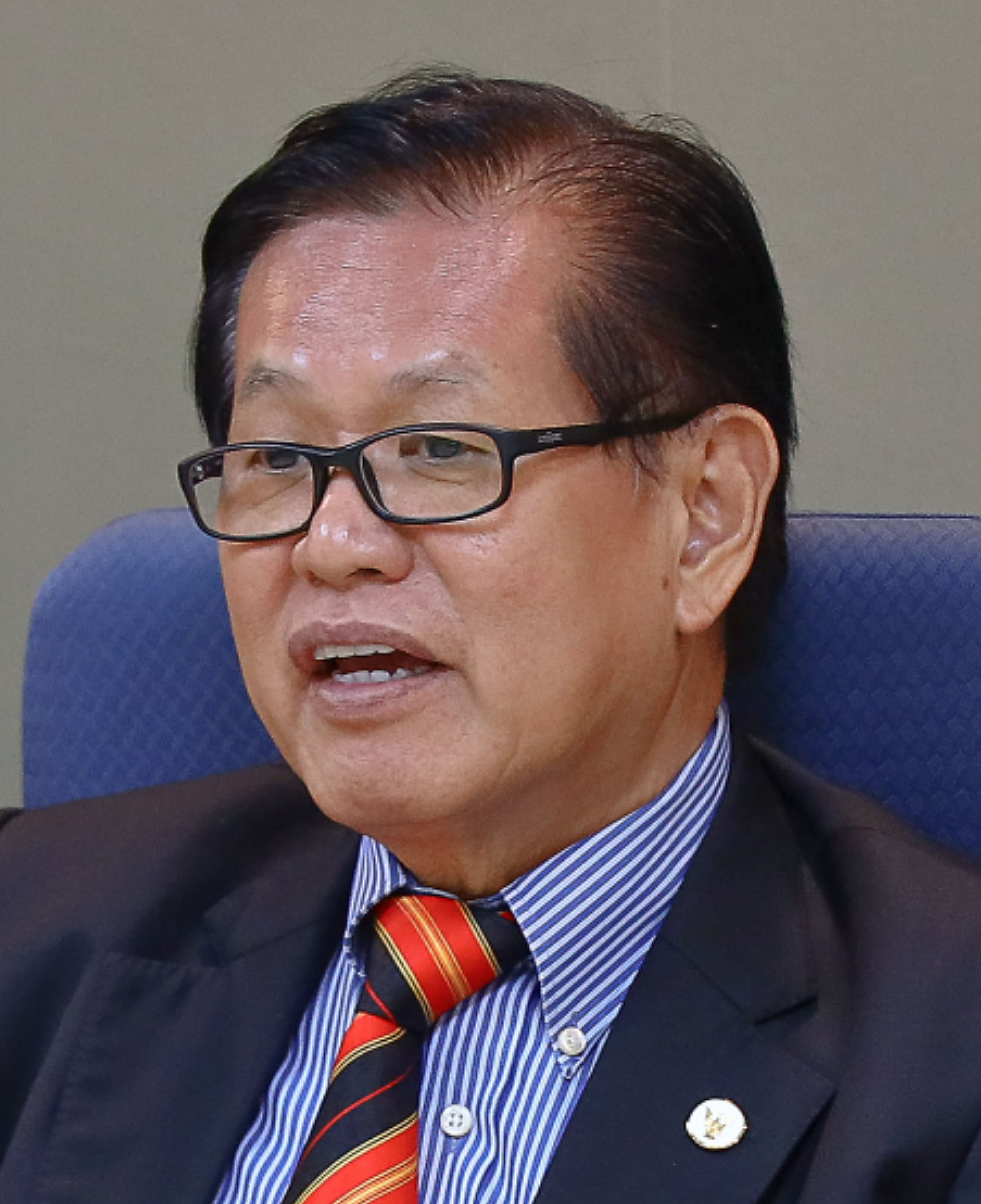
- Lee in 2019

Youth Chief of Sarawak United Peoples' Party
- In office 1996–2002
- President: George Chan Hong Nam

Ministerial roles (Sarawak)
- 2004–2009: Assistant Minister of Infrastructure Development and Communications
- 2009–2016: Assistant Minister of Sports and Communications
- 2016–2017: Assistant Minister of Tourism, Land, Air Transportation and Safety
- 2017–2019: Assistant Minister of Tourism, Art and Culture
- 2019–: Minister of Transport

Faction represented in Sarawak State Legislative Assembly
- 1996–2018: Barisan Nasional
- 2018: Sarawak United Peoples' Party
- 2018–: Gabungan Parti Sarawak

Personal details
- Born: Lee Kim Shin; 28 February 1950 (age 76) Miri, Crown Colony of Sarawak (now Sarawak, Malaysia)
- Citizenship: Malaysian
- Party: Sarawak United Peoples' Party (SUPP)
- Other political affiliations: Barisan Nasional (BN) (1992–2018, allied : since 2020); Gabungan Parti Sarawak (GPS) (since 2018); Perikatan Nasional (PN) (allied : since 2020)
- Education: University of Science, Malaysia
- Occupation: Politician

Lee Kim Shin (simplified Chinese: 李景胜; traditional Chinese: 李景勝; pinyin: Lǐ Jǐngshèng; Pe̍h-ōe-jī: Lí Kéng-sèng; born 28 February 1950), is a Sarawak politician who has served as Sarawak Minister of Transport in the Gabungan Parti Sarawak (GPS) administration under Premier Datuk Patinggi Abang Abdul Rahman Johari Abang Openg since August 2019 and Member of the Sarawak State Legislative Assembly (MLA) for Senadin since September 1996. He is a member of the Sarawak United Peoples' Party (SUPP), a component party of the ruling GPS coalition.

== Education ==
Lee graduated from the University of Science, Malaysia (USM) with a Bachelor of Social Science (B.Soc.Sc.) (Hons). He was also conferred with a Doctor of Letters honoris causa from Curtin University, Western Australia.

== Election results ==
Sarawak State Legislative Assembly
Year	Constituency	Candidate	Votes	Pct	Opponent(s)	Votes	Pct	Ballots cast	Majority	Turnout
1996	N57 Senadin	Lee Kim Shin (SUPP)	9,568	76.23%	Yong Honng Fuh (IND)	1,811	14.43%	12,552	7,757	56.65%
1996	N57 Senadin	Lee Kim Shin (SUPP)	9,568	76.23%	Hadin Mulau (IND)	1,173	9.34%	12,552	7,757	56.65%
2001	N57 Senadin	Lee Kim Shin (SUPP)	13,104	77.04%	Michael Teo Yu Keng (keADILan)	3,905	22.96%	17,490	9,199	62.17%
2006	N65 Senadin	Lee Kim Shin (SUPP)	7,173	75.13%	Chai Chook Fui (PKR)	2,374	24.87%	9,772	4,799	57.73%
2011	N65 Senadin	Lee Kim Shin (SUPP)	7,334	50.20%	Michael Teo Yu Keng (PKR)	7,276	49.80%	14,816	58	66.05%
2016	N75 Senadin	Lee Kim Shin (SUPP)	10,683	58.84%	Bob Baru Langub (DAP)	7,145	39.35%	18,358	3,538	65.86%
2016	N75 Senadin	Lee Kim Shin (SUPP)	10,683	58.84%	Philemon John Edan (PBDSB)	329	1.81%	18,358	3,538	65.86%
2021	N75 Senadin	Lee Kim Shin (SUPP)	10,535	62.30%	Marcus Hugo (DAP)	2,944	17.41%	16,909	7,591	50.51%
2021	N75 Senadin	Lee Kim Shin (SUPP)	10,535	62.30%	Suzanne Lee Tze Ha (PSB)	1,896	11.21%	16,909	7,591	50.51%
2021	N75 Senadin	Lee Kim Shin (SUPP)	10,535	62.30%	Eric Ngieng Sheng (PBK)	1,023	6.05%	16,909	7,591	50.51%
2021	N75 Senadin	Lee Kim Shin (SUPP)	10,535	62.30%	Bobby William (IND)	511	3.02%	16,909	7,591	50.51%

== Honours ==
- Malaysia
  - Officer of the Order of the Defender of the Realm (KMN) (2000)
  - Commander of the Order of Meritorious Service (PJN) – Datuk (2006)
- Sarawak
  - Gold Medal of the Sarawak Independence Diamond Jubilee Medal (2023)
  - Herald of the Most Exalted Order of the Star of Sarawak (BBS) (1984)
  - Meritorious Service Medal-Silver Civil Administration Medal (Sarawak) (PPB) (1990)
  - Officer of the Most Exalted Order of the Star of Sarawak (PBS) (1995)
  - Knight Commander of the Most Exalted Order of the Star of Sarawak (PNBS) – Dato Sri (2021)

== See also ==
- Senadin (state constituency)
