= Bekenu (state constituency) =

State constituency in Sarawak, Malaysia

Bekenu (N71)
Sarawak constituency

State constituency
- Legislature: Sarawak State Legislative Assembly
MLA
Vacant
- Constituency created: 2005
- First contested: 2006
- Last contested: 2026

Bekenu is a state constituency in Sarawak, Malaysia, that has been represented in the Sarawak State Legislative Assembly since 2006.

The state constituency was created in the 2005 redistribution and is mandated to return a single member to the Sarawak State Legislative Assembly under the first past the post voting system.

== Demographics ==
Ethnic breakdown of Bekenu's electorate as of 2022
1. Malay-Muslim bumiputera (43.9%)
2. Sarawak bumiputera (42.0%)
3. Chinese (11.7%)
4. Other ethnicities (2.40%)

== History ==
As of 2020, Bekenu has a population of 22,108 people.

=== Polling districts ===
According to the gazette issued on 31 October 2022, the Bekenu constituency has a total of 9 polling districts.

State constituency	Polling Districts	Code	Location
Bekenu（N71）	Batu Niah	218/71/01	SJK (C) Chee Mung Niah
Bekenu（N71）	Niah	218/47/02	SK Rancangan Sepupok Sebatu Niah; Dewan Masyarakat Sepupok; SK Kpg. Tarikan Kuala Niah; SK Kita Niah
Bekenu（N71）	Saeh	218/71/03	SK RH Mantali; SK Sg. Saeh Niah; Balai Raya RH Daud; SK Kpg. Tg. Belipat; SK Tanggap Niah
Bekenu（N71）	Kelulit	218/71/04	Balai Raya Kuala Sibuti; SK Beliau Isa Sibuti
Bekenu（N71）	Tiris	218/71/05	SK Beliau Ahad Sibuti; SJK (C) Chung Hua Lumut Sibuti
Bekenu（N71）	Bungai	218/71/06	SK Kpg. Abgus Sibuti; SK Kpg. Bungai Sibuti; Dewan Kampung Menjelin; Balai Raya Kpg. Selanyau
Bekenu（N71）	Bekanu	218/71/07	SK Kpg. Bulau Sibuti; SJK (C) Chung Hua Bekenu
Bekenu（N71）	Bakas	218/71/08	SK RH Tinggi Pakut, Sibuti; SK Sg. Bakas Sibuti; SK RH Esaau; SK Kelapa Sawit No. 4 Ladang Tiga
Bekenu（N71）	Hulu Sibuti	218/71/09	SK RH Barat

=== Representation history ===
Members of the Legislative Assembly for Bekenu
Assembly	No	Years	Member	Party
Constituency created from Lambir and Marudi
16th	N61	2006-2011	Rosey Yunus	BN (PDP)
17th	N61	2011-2014	Rosey Yunus	BN (PDP)
17th	N61	2014-2016	Rosey Yunus	TERAS
18th	N71	2016-2018	Rosey Yunus	BN (PBB)
18th	N71	2018-2021	Rosey Yunus	GPS (PBB)
19th	N71	2021–2026	Rosey Yunus	GPS (PBB)

== Election results ==
Sarawak state election, 2026
Party	Candidate	Votes	%	∆%
GPS				▲
PH				▲
Total valid votes				
Total rejected ballots				
Unreturned ballots				
Turnout				
Registered electors				
Majority				

Sarawak state election, 2021
Party	Candidate	Votes	%	∆%
GPS	Rosey Yunus	6,354	79.58	▲79.58
PKR	Norhafizah Mohammad Joharie	957	11.99	▼2.56
PSB	Abu Bakar Amit	377	4.72	▲4.72
PBK	Desmond Gani Pengiran	296	3.71	▲3.71
Total valid votes		7,984	100.00	
Total rejected ballots		140		
Unreturned ballots		48		
Turnout		8,172	64.48	▼5.23
Registered electors		12,674		
Majority		5,397	67.59	▲10.46
GPS gain from BN		Swing		?
Source(s) https://lom.agc.gov.my/ilims/upload/portal/akta/outputp/1718688/PUB687.pdf

Sarawak state election, 2016
Party	Candidate	Votes	%	∆%
BN	Rosey Yunus	6,009	71.68	▲1.34
PKR	Bill Kayong	1,220	14.55	▼2.97
Independent	Austin Sigi Melu	589	7.03	▲7.03
Independent	Joe @ Peter Jelin	565	6.74	▲6.74
Total valid votes		8,383	100.00	
Total rejected ballots		125		
Unreturned ballots		32		
Turnout		8,540	69.71	▲2.85
Registered electors		12,250		
Majority		4,789	57.13	▲4.32
BN hold		Swing		
Source(s) "Federal Government Gazette - Notice of Contested Election, State Legislative Assembly of the State of Sarawak [P.U. (B) 190/2016]" (PDF). Attorney General's Chambers of Malaysia. 25 April 2016. Archived from the original (PDF) on 12 June 2017. "Senarai Calon yang Disahkan Layak Bertanding Pilihan Raya Dewan Undangan Negeri ke-11". Election Commission of Malaysia. 25 April 2016. Archived from the original on 2016-04-25.

Sarawak state election, 2011
Party	Candidate	Votes	%	∆%
BN	Rosey Yunus	4,946	70.34	▼6.88
PKR	Ishak Mahwi	1,232	17.52	▼5.26
SNAP	Thony Badak	570	8.10	▲8.10
Love Malaysia Party	Dyg Juliana Awg Tambi	284	4.04	▲4.04
Total valid votes		7,032	100.00	
Total rejected ballots		103		
Unreturned ballots		0		
Turnout		7,135	66.86	▲9.84
Registered electors		10,672		
Majority		3,714	52.82	▼4.31
BN hold		Swing		
Source(s) "Federal Government Gazette - Results of Contested Election and Statements of the Poll after the Official Addition of Votes Sarawak [P.U. (B) 245/2011]" (PDF). Attorney General's Chambers of Malaysia. 29 April 2011.

Sarawak state election, 2006
Party	Candidate	Votes	%
BN	Rosey Yunus	4,357	77.22
PKR	Mohdak Ismail	1,285	22.78
Total valid votes		5,642	100.00
Total rejected ballots		112	
Unreturned ballots		3	
Turnout		5,757	57.02
Registered electors		10,095	
Majority		3,072	54.45
This was a new constituency created.
