= Lukanisman Awang Sauni =

Malaysian politician

Yang Berhormat Dato Lukanisman Awang Sauni PSBS ABK MP
- لوكنيسمان أواڠ ساوني

Deputy Minister of Foreign Affairs
- Incumbent
- Assumed office 17 December 2025
- Monarch: Ibrahim Iskandar
- Prime Minister: Anwar Ibrahim
- Minister: Mohamad Hasan
- Preceded by: Mohamad Alamin
- Constituency: Sibuti

Deputy Minister of Health
- In office 10 December 2022 – 17 December 2025
- Monarchs: Abdullah (2022–2024); Ibrahim Iskandar (since 2024)
- Prime Minister: Anwar Ibrahim
- Minister: Zaliha Mustafa (2022–2023); Dzulkefly Ahmad (since 2023)
- Preceded by: Noor Azmi Ghazali (Deputy Minister of Health I); Aaron Ago Dagang (Deputy Minister of Health II)
- Succeeded by: Hanifah Hajar Taib
- Constituency: Sibuti

Member of the Malaysian Parliament for Sibuti
- Incumbent
- Assumed office 9 May 2018
- Preceded by: Ahmad Lai Bujang (BN–PBB)
- Majority: 3,676 (2018); 11,745 (2022)

Chairman of the Sustainable Energy Development Authority
- In office 16 April 2020 – 3 December 2022
- Minister: Shamsul Anuar Nasarah (2020–2021); Takiyuddin Hassan (2021–Nov 2022); Nik Nazmi Nik Ahmad (Nov–Dec 2022)
- Chief Executive Officer: Hamzah Hussin
- Preceded by: Wong Kah Woh
- Succeeded by: Ahmad Zairin Ismail

Faction represented in Dewan Rakyat
- 2018: Parti Pesaka Bumiputera Bersatu
- 2018–: Gabungan Parti Sarawak

Personal details
- Born: Lukanisman bin Awang Sauni; 1 February 1982 (age 44) Miri, Sarawak, Malaysia
- Party: Parti Pesaka Bumiputera Bersatu (PBB) (–2019)
- Other political affiliations: Barisan Nasional (BN) (–2018); Gabungan Parti Sarawak (GPS) (since 2018)
- Education: University of Malaya
- Occupation: Politician

Lukanisman bin Awang Sauni (born 1 February 1982) is a Malaysian politician who has served as the Deputy Minister of Health in the Unity Government administration under Prime Minister Anwar Ibrahim as well as Ministers Zaliha Mustafa and Dzulkefly Ahmad since December 2022 and the Member of Parliament (MP) for Sibuti since May 2018. He previously served as the Chairman of the Sustainable Energy Development Authority (SEDA) from April 2020 to December 2022. He is a member of the Parti Pesaka Bumiputera Bersatu (PBB), a component party of the Gabungan Parti Sarawak (GPS) and formerly Barisan Nasional (BN) coalitions.

Lukanisman was born in Miri and is of mixed ethnic Melanau and Chinese descent. He obtained a bachelor's degree from University of Malaya. Prior to joining politics, he worked at the Special Affairs Department (JASA).

He contested for Sibuti at the 2018 election, where he defeated 2 opposition candidates — Jemat Panjang and Zulaihi Bakar, with a majority of 3,676 votes. As an MP from Sarawak, he has been putting efforts to make Niah Cave as a UNESCO World Heritage Site. He is also a member of the Young Parliamentary Caucus within the Dewan Rakyat.

== Election results ==
Parliament of Malaysia
Year	Constituency	Candidate	Votes	Pct	Opponent(s)	Votes	Pct	Ballots cast	Majority	Turnout
2018	P218 Sibuti	Lukanisman Awang Sauni (PBB)	12,214	54.60%	Jemat Panjang (PKR)	8,538	38.17%	22,369	3,676	70.19%
2018	P218 Sibuti	Lukanisman Awang Sauni (PBB)	12,214	54.60%	Zulaihi Bakar (PAS)	1,617	7.23%	22,369	3,676	70.19%
2022	P218 Sibuti	Lukanisman Awang Sauni (PBB)	22,150	65.31%	Zolhaidah Suboh (PKR)	10,405	30.68%	34,371	11,745	57.95%
2022	P218 Sibuti	Lukanisman Awang Sauni (PBB)	22,150	65.31%	Bobby William (PBDSB)	1,361	4.01%	34,371	11,745	57.95%

== Honours ==
=== Honours of Malaysia ===
- Malaysia
  - Recipient of the 17th Yang di-Pertuan Agong Installation Medal
- Sarawak
  - Commander of the Most Exalted Order of the Star of Sarawak (PSBS) – Dato (2023)
  - Member of the Order of the Star of Hornbill Sarawak (ABK) (2016)
  - Gold Medal of the Sarawak Independence Diamond Jubilee Medal (2023)
