= Rosey Yunus =

Malaysian politician

Yang Berhormat Datuk Rosey Yunus PGBK JBK PPB MLA
- روسي يونس

State Deputy Minister of Welfare, Women, Family Community Wellbeing and Childhood Development of Sarawak
- Incumbent
- Assumed office 28 September 2011 Serving with Francis Harden Hollis (Community Wellbeing) (2017-2022); Mohamad Razi Sitam (Community Wellbeing Development) (since 2022)
- Minister: Fatimah Abdullah
- Governor: Abang Muhammad Salahuddin (2011-2014); Abdul Taib Mahmud (2014-2024); Wan Junaidi Tuanku Jaafar (since 2024)
- Chief Minister: Abdul Taib Mahmud (2011-2014); Adenan Satem (2014-2017); Abang Abdul Rahman Johari Abang Openg (since 2017)
- Preceded by: Position established
- Constituency: Bekenu

Chairperson of Miri Port Authority
- In office 2008–2011
- Succeeded by: Palu @ Paulus Gumbang

Member of the Sarawak State Legislative Assembly for Bekenu
- Incumbent
- Assumed office 20 May 2006
- Preceded by: Position established
- Majority: 3,072 (2006); 3,714 (2011); 4,789 (2016); 5,397 (2021)

Personal details
- Born: 16 January 1956 (age 70) Miri, Crown Colony of Sarawak
- Citizenship: Malaysian
- Party: Sarawak Progressive Democratic Party (SPDP) (-2014); Parti Pesaka Bumiputera Bersatu (PBB) (since 2014)
- Other political affiliations: Barisan Nasional (BN) (-2018, allied:since 2020); Gabungan Parti Sarawak (GPS) (since 2018); Perikatan Nasional (PN) (allied:2020-2022); Pakatan Harapan (PH) (allied:since 2022)
- Education: University of Malaya
- Occupation: Politician
- Profession: Teacher

Rosey binti Haji Yunus (born 16 January 1956) is a Malaysian politician and teacher who serves as the State Deputy Minister of Women, Family, Welfare, Community Wellbeing and Childhood Development of Sarawak since September 2011 and Member of the Sarawak State Legislative Assembly (MLA) for Bekenu since May 2006. She is the member of the Parti Pesaka Bumiputera Bersatu (PBB) since 2014.

== Education ==
Rosey graduated from the University of Malaya with a Bachelor of Arts (BA) (Hons) majoring in linguistic art with upper second-class honours and a Diploma of Education in 1980.

== Political career ==
Rosey was first elected assemblywoman for Bekenu in the 2006 Sarawak state election. In 2011, she successfully defended her seat in the following elections with an increased majority and was appointed as Assistant Minister for the newly created Ministry of Welfare, Women & Family Development.

Rosey was formerly a member of the Sarawak Progressive Democratic Party (SPDP) before joining then-president William Mawan Ikom and three other assemblymen in leaving the party in 2014.

== Election results ==
Sarawak State Legislative Assembly
Year	Constituency	Candidate	Votes	Pct	Opponent(s)	Votes	Pct	Valid ballots	Majority	Turnout
2006	N61 Bekenu	Rosey Yunus (SDPD)	4,357	77.22%	Mohdak Ismail (PKR)	1,285	22.78%	5,642	3,072	5,757
2011	N61 Bekenu	Rosey Yunus (SDPD)	4,946	70.34%	Ishak Mahwi (PKR)	1,232	17.52%	7,032	3,714	7,135
2011	N61 Bekenu	Rosey Yunus (SDPD)	4,946	70.34%	Thony Badak (SNAP)	570	8.10%	7,032	3,714	7,135
2011	N61 Bekenu	Rosey Yunus (SDPD)	4,946	70.34%	Dyg Juliana Awg Tambi (PCM)	284	4.04%	7,032	3,714	7,135
2016	N71 Bekenu	Rosey Yunus (PBB)	6,009	71.68%	Bill Kayong (PKR)	1,220	14.45%	8,383	4,789	8,540
2016	N71 Bekenu	Rosey Yunus (PBB)	6,009	71.68%	Austin Sigi Melu (IND)	589	7.03%	8,383	4,789	8,540
2016	N71 Bekenu	Rosey Yunus (PBB)	6,009	71.68%	Joe @ Peter Jelin (IND)	565	6.74%	8,383	4,789	8,540
2021	N71 Bekenu	Rosey Yunus (PBB)	6,354	79.58%	Norhafizah Joharie (PKR)	957	11.99%	7,984	5,397	62.15%
2021	N71 Bekenu	Rosey Yunus (PBB)	6,354	79.58%	Abu Bakar Amit (PSB)	377	4.72%	7,984	5,397	62.15%
2021	N71 Bekenu	Rosey Yunus (PBB)	6,354	79.58%	Desmond Gani (PBK)	296	3.71%	7,984	5,397	62.15%

== Honours ==
- Sarawak
  - Commander of the Order of the Star of Hornbill Sarawak (PGBK) – Datuk (2020)
  - Companion of the Order of the Star of Hornbill Sarawak (JBK) (2010)
  - Meritorious Service Medal-Silver Civil Administration Medal (Sarawak) (PPB) (2005)

== See also ==
- Bekenu (state constituency)
