= Lambir (federal constituency) =

Sarawak constituency

Defunct federal constituency
- Legislature: Dewan Rakyat
- Constituency created: 1977
- Constituency abolished: 1990
- First contested: 1978
- Last contested: 1986

Lambir was a federal constituency in Sarawak, Malaysia, that was represented in the Dewan Rakyat from 1978 to 1990.

The federal constituency was created in the 1977 redistribution and was mandated to return a single member to the Dewan Rakyat under the first past the post voting system.

== History ==
It was abolished in 1990 when it was redistributed.

=== Representation history ===
Members of Parliament for Lambir
Parliament	No	Years	Member	Party	Vote Share
Constituency created from Bintulu and Miri-Subis
5th	P152	1978-1982	Raymond Szetu Mei Thong (司徒美堂)	SAPO	10,150; 52.24%
6th	P152	1982-1986	George Chan Hong Nam (陈康南)	BN (SUPP)	17,898; 71.00%
7th	P175	1986-1990	Peter Chin Fah Kui (陈华贵)	BN (SUPP)	15,933; 55.01%
Constituency abolished, split into Baram, Bintulu and Miri

=== State constituency ===
Parliamentary constituency	State constituency					
Parliamentary constituency	1969–1978	1978–1990	1990–1999	1999–2008	2008–2016	2016−present
Lambir		Miri				
Lambir		Subis				

=== Historical boundaries ===
State Constituency	Area
State Constituency	1977
Miri	Luak; Kuala Baram; Piasau; Senadin; Sungai Tujoh
Subis	Kuala Nyalau; Lambir; Bekenu; Niah; Subis

== Election results ==
Malaysian general election, 1986
Party	Candidate	Votes	%	∆%
BN	Peter Chin Fah Kui	15,933	55.01	▼15.99
DAP	Wong Ho Leng	10,380	35.84	▲17.26
Independent	Abang Ismail Abang Peel	2,651	9.15	▲9.15
Total valid votes		28,964	100.00	
Total rejected ballots		522		
Unreturned ballots		0		
Turnout		29,486	60.06	▼5.40
Registered electors		49,095		
Majority		5,553	19.17	▼33.25
BN hold		Swing		

Malaysian general election, 1982
Party	Candidate	Votes	%	∆%
BN	George Chan Hong Nam	17,898	71.00	▲23.24
DAP	Peter Hwang Teck Nai	4,685	18.58	▲18.58
Independent	Hussein Abdul Rahim	1,794	7.12	▲7.12
Independent	Richard Frederick	503	2.00	▲2.00
Independent	Jonathan Saong	329	1.31	▲1.31
Total valid votes		25,209	100.00	
Total rejected ballots		561		
Unreturned ballots		0		
Turnout		25,770	65.46	▼1.51
Registered electors		39,370		
Majority		13,213	52.42	▲47.94
BN gain from Sarawak People's Organization		Swing		?

Malaysian general election, 1978
Party	Candidate	Votes	%
Sarawak People's Organization	Raymond Szetu Mei Thong	10,150	52.24
BN	Chia Chin Shin	9,278	47.76
Total valid votes		19,428	100.00
Total rejected ballots		680	
Unreturned ballots		0	
Turnout		20,108	66.97
Registered electors		30,026	
Majority		872	4.48
This was a new constituency created.
