= Senadin =

State constituency in Sarawak, Malaysia

Senadin (N75)
Sarawak constituency

State constituency
- Legislature: Sarawak State Legislative Assembly
MLA
Vacant
- Constituency created: 1996
- First contested: 1996
- Last contested: 2026

Senadin is a state constituency in Sarawak, Malaysia, that has been represented in the Sarawak State Legislative Assembly since 1996.

The state constituency was created in the 1996 redistribution and is mandated to return a single member to the Sarawak State Legislative Assembly under the first past the post voting system.

== Demographics ==
Ethnic breakdown of Senadin's electorate as of 2022
1. Sarawak bumiputera (43.3%)
2. Chinese (33.8%)
3. Malay-Muslim bumiputera (21.4%)
4. Other ethnicities (1.50%)

== History ==
As of 2020, Senadin has a population of 132,335 people.

=== Polling districts ===
According to the gazette issued on 31 October 2022, the Senadin constituency has a total of 3 polling districts.

State constituency	Polling Districts	Code	Location
Senadin (N75)	Kuala Baram	219/75/01	SK Tudan; SK Senadin; SMK Pujut; Dewan Kg. Pangkalan Lutong; SK Merbau; SMK Merbau; SJK (C) Chung Hua Tuda; SK Tudan Jaya; SK Kuala Baram; SK Kuala Baram II
Senadin (N75)	Lopeng	219/75/02	SK Agama; SMK Baru; RH Dok Sg. Teniku Miri
Senadin (N75)	Riam	219/75/03	SJK (C) Chung San Riam Miri

=== Representation history ===
Members of the Legislative Assembly for Senadin
Assembly	No	Years	Member	Party
Constituency created from Piasau and Lambir
14th	N57	1996-2001	Lee Kim Shin (李景胜)	BN (SUPP)
15th	N57	2001-2006	Lee Kim Shin (李景胜)	BN (SUPP)
16th	N65	2006-2011	Lee Kim Shin (李景胜)	BN (SUPP)
17th	N65	2011-2016	Lee Kim Shin (李景胜)	BN (SUPP)
18th	N75	2016-2018	Lee Kim Shin (李景胜)	BN (SUPP)
18th	N75	2018-2021	Lee Kim Shin (李景胜)	GPS (SUPP)
19th	N75	2021–2026	Lee Kim Shin (李景胜)	GPS (SUPP)

== Election results ==
Sarawak state election, 2026: Senadin
Party	Candidate	Votes	%	∆%
GPS				▲
PH				▲
Total valid votes				
Total rejected ballots				
Unreturned ballots				
Turnout				
Registered electors				
Majority				

Sarawak state election, 2021: Senadin
Party	Candidate	Votes	%	∆%
GPS	Lee Kim Shin	10,535	62.30	▲62.30
DAP	Marcus Hugo	2,944	17.41	▼21.94
PSB	Suzanne Lee Tze Ha	1,896	11.21	▲11.21
PBK	Eric Ngieng Sheng	1,023	6.05	▲6.05
PBDS Baru	Bobby William	511	3.02	▲3.02
Total valid votes		16,909	100.00	
Total rejected ballots		189		
Unreturned ballots		87		
Turnout		17,185	50.37	▼15.49
Registered electors		34,117		
Majority		7,591	44.89	▲25.40
GPS gain from BN		Swing		?
Source(s) https://lom.agc.gov.my/ilims/upload/portal/akta/outputp/1718688/PUB687.pdf

Sarawak state election, 2016: Senadin
Party	Candidate	Votes	%	∆%
BN	Lee Kim Shin	10,683	58.84	▲8.64
DAP	Bob Baru Langub	7,145	39.35	▲39.35
PBDS Baru	Philemon John Edan	329	1.81	▲1.81
Total valid votes		18,157	100.00	
Total rejected ballots		167		
Unreturned ballots		34		
Turnout		18,358	65.86	▼0.19
Registered electors		27,874		
Majority		3,538	19.49	▲19.09
BN hold		Swing		
Source(s) "Federal Government Gazette - Notice of Contested Election, State Legislative Assembly of the State of Sarawak [P.U. (B) 190/2016]" (PDF). Attorney General's Chambers of Malaysia. 25 April 2016. "Senarai Calon yang Disahkan Layak Bertanding Pilihan Raya Dewan Undangan Negeri ke-11". Election Commission of Malaysia. 25 April 2016. Archived from the original on 25 April 2016.

Sarawak state election, 2011: Senadin
Party	Candidate	Votes	%	∆%
BN	Lee Kim Shin	7,334	50.20	▼24.93
PKR	Michael Teo Yu Keng	7,276	49.80	▲24.93
Total valid votes		14,610	100.00	
Total rejected ballots		186		
Unreturned ballots		20		
Turnout		14,816	66.05	▲8.32
Registered electors		22,432		
Majority		58	0.40	▼49.87
BN hold		Swing		
Source(s) "Federal Government Gazette - Results of Contested Election and Statements of the Poll after the Official Addition of Votes Sarawak [P.U. (B) 245/2011]" (PDF). Attorney General's Chambers of Malaysia. 29 April 2011.

Sarawak state election, 2006: Senadin
Party	Candidate	Votes	%	∆%
BN	Lee Kim Shin	7,173	75.13	▼1.91
PKR	Chai Chook Fui	2,374	24.87	▲1.91
Total valid votes		9,547	100.00	
Total rejected ballots		127		
Unreturned ballots		98		
Turnout		9,772	57.73	▼4.44
Registered electors		16,925		
Majority		4,799	50.27	▼3.81
BN hold		Swing		

Sarawak state election, 2001: Senadin
Party	Candidate	Votes	%	∆%
BN	Lee Kim Shin	13,104	77.04	▲0.81
PKR	Michael Teo Yu Keng	3,905	22.96	▲22.96
Total valid votes		17,009	100.00	
Total rejected ballots		180		
Unreturned ballots		301		
Turnout		17,490	62.17	▲5.52
Registered electors		28,132		
Majority		9,199	54.08	▼7.72
BN hold		Swing		

Sarawak state election, 1996: Senadin
Party	Candidate	Votes	%	∆%
BN	Lee Kim Shin	9,568	76.23	
Independent	Yong Honng Fuh	1,811	14.43	
Independent	Hadin Mulau	1,173	9.34	
Total valid votes		12,552	100.00	
Total rejected ballots		233		
Unreturned ballots		0		
Turnout		12,785	56.65	
Registered electors		22,567		
Majority		7,757	61.80	
This was a new constituency created.
