= Results of the 2022 Malaysian general election by parliamentary constituency =

These are the election results of the 2022 Malaysian general election by parliamentary constituency. Results are expected to come after 6 pm, 19 November 2022. Elected members of parliament (MPs) will be representing their constituency from the first sitting of 15th Malaysian Parliament to its dissolution.

The parliamentary election deposit was set at RM10,000 per candidate. Similar to previous elections, the election deposit will be forfeited if the particular candidate had failed to secure at least 12.5% or one-eighth of the votes.

== General results ==
Party or alliance		Votes	%	Seats	+/–
Pakatan Harapan	People's Justice Party	2,477,741	15.87	31	–16
Pakatan Harapan	Democratic Action Party	2,422,581	15.52	40	–2
Pakatan Harapan	National Trust Party	884,391	5.66	8	–3
Pakatan Harapan	Malaysian United Democratic Alliance	74,392	0.48	1	New
Pakatan Harapan	United Progressive Kinabalu Organisation	72,751	0.47	2	+1
Pakatan Harapan	Total	5,931,856	37.99	82	–19
Perikatan Nasional	Pan-Malaysian Islamic Party	2,378,811	15.24	43	+25
Perikatan Nasional	Malaysian United Indigenous Party	2,064,201	13.22	31	+17
Perikatan Nasional	Parti Gerakan Rakyat Malaysia	276,653	1.77	0	0
Perikatan Nasional	Total	4,719,665	30.23	74	+43
Barisan Nasional	United Malays National Organisation	2,539,061	16.26	26	–28
Barisan Nasional	Malaysian Chinese Association	684,104	4.38	2	+1
Barisan Nasional	Malaysian Indian Congress	168,014	1.08	1	–1
Barisan Nasional	Parti Bersatu Rakyat Sabah	23,877	0.15	1	0
Barisan Nasional	Malaysian Indian Muslim Congress	21,468	0.14	0	0
Barisan Nasional	Malaysia Makkal Sakti Party	10,660	0.07	0	0
Barisan Nasional	All Malaysian Indian Progressive Front	7,387	0.05	0	0
Barisan Nasional	Love Malaysia Party	5,417	0.03	0	0
Barisan Nasional	Total	3,459,988	22.16	30	–28
Gabungan Parti Sarawak	Parti Pesaka Bumiputera Bersatu	343,954	2.20	14	+1
Gabungan Parti Sarawak	Sarawak United Peoples' Party	167,063	1.07	2	+1
Gabungan Parti Sarawak	Progressive Democratic Party	84,045	0.54	2	0
Gabungan Parti Sarawak	Parti Rakyat Sarawak	67,539	0.43	5	+2
Gabungan Parti Sarawak	Total	662,601	4.24	23	+4
Heritage Party		281,611	1.80	3	–5
Gabungan Rakyat Sabah	Direct members of GRS	94,413	0.60	4	+4
Gabungan Rakyat Sabah	United Sabah Party	65,311	0.42	1	0
Gabungan Rakyat Sabah	Homeland Solidarity Party	29,874	0.19	1	0
Gabungan Rakyat Sabah	Sabah Progressive Party	5,054	0.03	0	0
Gabungan Rakyat Sabah	Total	194,652	1.25	6	+4
Gerakan Tanah Air	Homeland Fighter's Party	79,594	0.51	0	0
Gerakan Tanah Air	Parti Bumiputera Perkasa Malaysia	16,360	0.10	0	0
Gerakan Tanah Air	Pan-Malaysian Islamic Front	11,386	0.07	0	0
Gerakan Tanah Air	National Indian Muslim Alliance Party	4,530	0.03	0	0
Gerakan Tanah Air	Total	111,870	0.72	0	0
Sarawak United; People's Alliance	Parti Sarawak Bersatu	57,579	0.37	0	–1
Sarawak United; People's Alliance	Parti Bansa Dayak Sarawak Baru	3,053	0.02	0	0
Sarawak United; People's Alliance	Parti Bumi Kenyalang	2,311	0.01	0	0
Sarawak United; People's Alliance	Total	62,943	0.40	0	–1
Social Democratic Harmony Party		52,054	0.33	1	New
Parti Bangsa Malaysia		16,437	0.11	1	–5
PSM–PRM informal coalition	Parti Rakyat Malaysia	6,293	0.04	0	0
PSM–PRM informal coalition	Socialist Party of Malaysia	779	0.00	0	0
PSM–PRM informal coalition	Total	7,072	0.05	0	0
Sarawak People's Awareness Party		1,036	0.01	0	0
Sabah People's Unity Party		541	0.00	0	0
People's First Party		264	0.00	0	0
Independents		111,390	0.71	2	–1
Total		15,613,980	100.00	222	0
Valid votes		15,613,980	98.71		
Invalid/blank votes		203,327	1.29		
Total votes		15,817,307	100.00		
Registered voters/turnout		21,173,638	74.70		
Source: ElectionData.MY

== Contesting parties ==
Name		Ideology	Leader(s)	Seats contested	2018 result		Seats in 14th Dewan Rakyat
Name		Ideology	Leader(s)	Seats contested	Votes (%)	Seats	Seats in 14th Dewan Rakyat
PH	Pakatan Harapan; Alliance of Hope	Reformism / Progressivism	Anwar Ibrahim	220	41.3%	100 / 222	90 / 222
BN	Barisan Nasional; National Front	National conservatism	Ahmad Zahid Hamidi	178	27.8%	58 / 222	42 / 222
PN	Perikatan Nasional; National Front	National conservatism	Muhyiddin Yassin	171	24.1%	32 / 222	39 / 222
GPS	Gabungan Parti Sarawak; Sarawak Parties Alliance	Sarawak regionalism	Abang Johari Openg	31	3.8%	19 / 222	19 / 222
GRS	Gabungan Rakyat Sabah; Sabah People's Alliance	Sabah regionalism	Hajiji Noor	13	0.7%	2 / 222	7 / 222
WARISAN	Parti Warisan; Heritage Party	Multiculturalism	Mohd. Shafie Apdal	52	2.3%	8 / 222	7 / 222
PBM	Parti Bangsa Malaysia; Malaysia Nation Party	Multiracialism	Larry Sng Wei Shien	5	New Party	0 / 222	6 / 222
GTA	Gerakan Tanah Air; Homeland Movement	Malay nationalism	Mahathir Mohamad	125	<0.1%	0 / 222	4 / 222
PERKASA	Perikatan Rakyat Bersatu Sarawak; Sarawak United People's Alliance	Sarawak regionalism	Wong Soon Koh	14	<0.1%	0 / 222	1 / 222
PRM	Parti Rakyat Malaysia; Malaysian People's Party	Progressivism	Ariffin Salimon	15	<0.1%	0 / 222	0 / 222
KDM	Parti Kesejahteraan Demokratik Masyarakat; Social Democratic Harmony Party	Sabah regionalism	Peter Anthony	7	New Party	0 / 222	0 / 222
PSM	Parti Sosialis Malaysia; Socialist Party of Malaysia	Democratic socialism	Michael Jeyakumar Devaraj	1	<0.1%	0 / 222	0 / 222
SEDAR	Parti Kesedaran Rakyat Sarawak; Sarawak People's Awareness Party	Sarawak regionalism	Othman Abdullah	1	New Party	0 / 222	0 / 222
PPRS	Parti Perpaduan Rakyat Sabah; Sabah People's Unity Party	Sabah regionalism	Arshad Mualap	1	<0.1%	0 / 222	0 / 222
PUR	Parti Utama Rakyat; People's First Party	Social democracy	Mohammad Daud Leong	1	<0.1%	0 / 222	0 / 222
Independents		–	–	108	–	3 / 222	3 / 222

== Synopsis of results ==
Results by district — 2022 Malaysian general election
District	State	2018	Incumbent	Winning party					Turnout excluding spoilt ballots	Votes (Note: minor political parties receiving less than 0.5% of the national popular vote are aggregated under "Other"; independent candidates are aggregated combined)											
District	State	2018	Incumbent	Party	Votes	Share	Margin #	Margin %	Turnout excluding spoilt ballots	PH + MUDA	PN	BN	GPS	WARISAN	GRS	KDM	PBM	GTA	Ind	Other	Total
P001 Padang Besar	Perlis	BN (UMNO)	Ind	PN (PAS)	24,267	53.58%	12,514	27.63%	75.24%	7,085	24,267	11,753	–	244	–	–	–	–	1,939	–	45,288
P002 Kangar	Perlis	PH (PKR)	PH (PKR)	PN (BERSATU)	24,562	43.70%	9,192	16.36%	75.07%	15,143	24,562	15,370	–	417	–	–	–	708	–	–	56,200
P003 Arau	Perlis	BN (UMNO)	BN (UMNO)	PN (PAS)	31,458	67.23%	23,216	49.62%	76.86%	7,089	31,458	8,242	–	–	–	–	–	–	–	–	46,789
P004 Langkawi	Kedah	PH (BERSATU)	GTA (PEJUANG)	PN (BERSATU)	25,463	53.63%	13,518	28.47%	71.10%	5,417	25,463	11,945	–	–	–	–	–	4,566	89	–	47,480
P005 Jerlun	Kedah	PH (BERSATU)	GTA (PEJUANG)	PN (PAS)	31,635	60.59%	20,456	39.18%	77.07%	6,149	31,635	11,229	–	–	–	–	–	3,144	–	–	52,207
P006 Kubang Pasu	Kedah	PH (BERSATU)	GTA (PEJUANG)	PN (BERSATU)	47,584	57.05%	31,584	37.87%	76.86%	16,000	47,584	14,489	–	–	–	–	–	5,329	–	–	83,402
P007 Padang Terap	Kedah	BN (UMNO)	BN (UMNO)	PN (PAS)	28,217	58.03%	10,959	22.54%	81.31%	2,702	28,217	17,258	–	–	–	–	–	452	–	–	48,629
P008 Pokok Sena	Kedah	PH (AMANAH)	PH (AMANAH)	PN (PAS)	52,275	59.44%	31,751	36.10%	76.58%	20,524	52,275	14,523	–	622	–	–	–	–	–	–	87,944
P009 Alor Setar	Kedah	PH (PKR)	PH (PKR)	PN (PAS)	37,486	48.69%	9,931	12.90%	75.83%	27,555	37,486	8,930	–	–	–	–	–	2,383	266	–	76,986
P010 Kuala Kedah	Kedah	PH (PKR)	PH (PKR)	PN (PAS)	56,298	56.03%	28,061	27.93%	75.83%	28,237	56,298	13,879	–	256	–	–	–	1,805	–	–	100,475
P011 Pendang	Kedah	PN (PAS)	PN (PAS)	PN (PAS)	49,008	64.83%	31,289	41.39%	79.95%	8,058	49,008	17,719	–	–	–	–	–	809	–	–	75,594
P012 Jerai	Kedah	PN (PAS)	PN (PAS)	PN (PAS)	49,461	60.10%	33,192	40.33%	78.37%	15,590	49,461	16,269	–	–	–	–	–	973	–	–	82,293
P013 Sik	Kedah	PN (PAS)	PN (PAS)	PN (PAS)	34,606	67.64%	21,787	42.59%	81.05%	3,736	34,606	12,819	–	–	–	–	–	–	–	–	51,161
P014 Merbok	Kedah	PH (PKR)	PH (PKR)	PN (BERSATU)	52,573	51.27%	21,019	20.50%	77.42%	31,554	52,573	16,691	–	525	–	–	–	1,201	–	–	102,544
P015 Sungai Petani	Kedah	PH (PKR)	PH (PKR)	PH (PKR)	50,580	38.91%	1,115	0.86%	77.00%	50,580	49,465	27,391	–	–	–	–	–	–	–	226	130,004
P016 Baling	Kedah	BN (UMNO)	BN (UMNO)	PN (PAS)	64,493	59.13%	29,137	26.71%	82.57%	8,636	64,493	35,356	–	–	–	–	–	579	–	–	109,068
P017 Padang Serai	Kedah	PH (PKR)	PH (PKR)	PN (BERSATU)	51,637	63.42%	16,260	19.97%	60.82%	35,377	51,637	2,983	–	149	–	–	–	424	–	–	81,416
P018 Kulim-Bandar Baharu	Kedah	PH (PKR)	PH (PKR)	PN (BERSATU)	34,469	49.00%	13,061	18.57%	78.03%	21,408	34,469	13,872	–	–	–	–	–	591	–	–	70,340
P019 Tumpat	Kelantan	GS (PAS)	BN (UMNO)	PN (PAS)	65,426	61.65%	34,793	32.78%	71.05%	7,762	65,426	30,633	–	245	–	–	–	593	–	–	106,131
P020 Pengkalan Chepa	Kelantan	GS (PAS)	PN (PAS)	PN (PAS)	53,933	68.57%	38,270	48.65%	73.53%	7,356	53,933	15,633	–	–	–	–	–	358	451	–	78,659
P021 Kota Bharu	Kelantan	GS (PAS)	PN (PAS)	PN (PAS)	41,869	53.67%	22,613	28.98%	67.58%	19,256	41,869	16,168	–	–	–	–	–	528	91	107	78,019
P022 Pasir Mas	Kelantan	GS (PAS)	PN (PAS)	PN (PAS)	44,444	68.21%	30,717	47.15%	68.91%	6,439	44,444	13,727	–	–	–	–	–	543	–	–	65,153
P023 Rantau Panjang	Kelantan	GS (PAS)	PN (PAS)	PN (PAS)	37,759	62.38%	20,636	34.09%	64.91%	4,256	37,759	17,123	–	–	–	–	–	1,216	–	173	60,527
P024 Kubang Kerian	Kelantan	GS (PAS)	PN (PAS)	PN (PAS)	55,654	68.38%	40,847	50.19%	71.62%	10,236	55,654	14,807	–	–	–	–	–	687	–	–	81,384
P025 Bachok	Kelantan	GS (PAS)	PN (PAS)	PN (PAS)	57,496	64.30%	29,901	33.44%	72.59%	4,366	57,496	27,229	–	–	–	–	–	274	418	–	89,417
P026 Ketereh	Kelantan	BN (UMNO)	BN (UMNO)	PN (BERSATU)	40,542	64.49%	23,107	36.76%	73.71%	4,662	40,542	17,435	–	–	–	–	–	223	–	–	62,862
P027 Tanah Merah	Kelantan	BN (UMNO)	PN (BERSATU)	PN (BERSATU)	54,266	77.87%	44,485	63.84%	70.55%	5,357	54,266	9,781	–	–	–	–	–	168	114	–	69,686
P028 Pasir Puteh	Kelantan	GS (PAS)	PN (PAS)	PN (PAS)	52,937	65.37%	29,109	35.95%	71.62%	3,864	52,937	23,828	–	–	–	–	–	349	–	–	80,978
P029 Machang	Kelantan	BN (UMNO)	BN (UMNO)	PN (BERSATU)	35,603	54.68%	10,154	15.59%	73.30%	3,934	35,603	25,449	–	–	–	–	–	128	–	–	65,114
P030 Jeli	Kelantan	BN (UMNO)	PN (BERSATU)	PN (PAS)	27,072	63.03%	12,464	29.02%	71.83%	1,140	27,072	14,608	–	–	–	–	–	133	–	–	42,953
P031 Kuala Krai	Kelantan	GS (PAS)	PN (PAS)	PN (PAS)	42,740	66.08%	25,188	38.94%	70.05%	4,148	42,740	17,552	–	–	–	–	–	241	–	–	64,681
P032 Gua Musang	Kelantan	BN (UMNO)	BN (UMNO)	PN (BERSATU)	21,826	45.12%	163	0.34%	68.86%	4,517	21,826	21,663	–	–	–	–	–	371	–	–	48,377
P033 Besut	Terengganu	BN (UMNO)	BN (UMNO)	PN (PAS)	49,569	58.07%	18,666	21.87%	76.46%	4,339	49,569	30,903	–	–	–	–	–	553	–	–	85,364
P034 Setiu	Terengganu	GS (PAS)	BN (UMNO)	PN (PAS)	50,768	59.85%	19,032	22.43%	79.06%	2,125	50,768	31,736	–	–	–	–	–	203	–	–	84,832
P035 Kuala Nerus	Terengganu	GS (PAS)	BN (UMNO)	PN (PAS)	56,697	64.70%	29,765	33.97%	82.71%	3,708	56,697	26,932	–	–	–	–	–	291	–	–	87,628
P036 Kuala Terengganu	Terengganu	GS (PAS)	PN (PAS)	PN (PAS)	63,016	65.27%	40,907	42.37%	78.30%	10,946	63,016	22,109	–	–	–	–	–	481	–	–	96,552
P037 Marang	Terengganu	GS (PAS)	PN (PAS)	PN (PAS)	73,115	67.04%	41,796	38.32%	82.78%	4,140	73,115	31,386	–	–	–	–	–	427	–	–	109,068
P038 Hulu Terengganu	Terengganu	BN (UMNO)	PN (BERSATU)	PN (BERSATU)	42,910	59.59%	15,734	21.85%	81.90%	1,740	42,910	15,734	–	–	–	–	–	182	–	–	72,008
P039 Dungun	Terengganu	GS (PAS)	PN (PAS)	PN (PAS)	59,720	65.43%	34,105	37.37%	78.98%	5,307	59,720	25,615	–	–	–	–	–	322	305	–	91,269
P040 Kemaman	Terengganu	GS (PAS)	PN (PAS)	PN (PAS)	65,714	58.11%	27,179	24.03%	81.12%	8,340	65,714	38,535	–	–	–	–	–	506	–	–	113,095
P041 Kepala Batas	Pulau Pinang	BN (UMNO)	BN (UMNO)	PN (PAS)	28,604	41.27%	2,867	4.14%	83.41%	14,214	28,604	25,737	–	–	–	–	–	747	–	–	69,302
P042 Tasek Gelugor	Pulau Pinang	BN (UMNO)	PN (BERSATU)	PN (BERSATU)	31,116	46.36%	12,252	18.26%	82.99%	16,547	31,458	18,864	–	179	–	–	–	406	–	–	67,112
P043 Bagan	Pulau Pinang	PH (DAP)	PH (DAP)	PH (DAP)	55,797	81.27%	49,648	72.32%	76.75%	55,797	6,149	5,385	–	–	–	–	–	1,323	–	–	68,654
P044 Permatang Pauh	Pulau Pinang	PH (PKR)	PH (PKR)	PN (PAS)	37,638	43.04%	5,272	6.03%	81.59%	32,366	37,638	16,971	–	–	–	–	–	473	–	–	87,448
P045 Bukit Mertajam	Pulau Pinang	PH (DAP)	PH (DAP)	PH (DAP)	71,722	77.33%	57,685	62.20%	76.76%	71,722	14,037	6,986	–	–	–	–	–	–	–	–	92,745
P046 Batu Kawan	Pulau Pinang	PH (PKR)	PH (PKR)	PH (PKR)	50,744	73.72%	40,400	58.69%	77.50%	50,744	10,344	7,145	–	450	–	–	–	–	–	148	68,831
P047 Nibong Tebal	Pulau Pinang	PH (PKR)	PN (BERSATU)	PH (PKR)	42,188	53.20%	16,293	20.54%	79.26%	42,188	25,895	10,660	–	–	–	–	–	–	565	–	79,308
P048 Bukit Bendera	Pulau Pinang	PH (DAP)	PH (DAP)	PH (DAP)	49,353	78.98%	42,610	68.19%	67.54%	49,353	6,743	5,417	–	–	–	–	–	–	299	677	62,489
P049 Tanjong	Pulau Pinang	PH (DAP)	PH (DAP)	PH (DAP)	31,968	84.83%	28,754	76.30%	71.37%	31,968	3,214	2,501	–	–	–	–	–	–	–	–	37,683
P050 Jelutong	Pulau Pinang	PH (DAP)	PH (DAP)	PH (DAP)	50,369	71.24%	38,604	54.60%	75.23%	50,369	11,765	7,387	–	442	–	–	–	–	480	264	70,707
P051 Bukit Gelugor	Pulau Pinang	PH (DAP)	PH (DAP)	PH (DAP)	71,204	82.73%	63,112	73.32%	73.48%	71,204	8,092	6,777	–	–	–	–	–	–	–	–	86,073
P052 Bayan Baru	Pulau Pinang	PH (PKR)	PH (PKR)	PH (PKR)	55,209	61.54%	34,902	38.91%	74.98%	55,209	20,307	13,377	–	440	–	–	–	–	124	251	89,708
P053 Balik Pulau	Pulau Pinang	PH (PKR)	PH (PKR)	PH (PKR)	24,564	38.43%	1,582	2.48%	79.63%	24,564	22,982	15,478	–	–	–	–	–	341	546	–	63,911
P054 Gerik	Perak	BN (UMNO)	Vacant	PN (BERSATU)	15,105	43.64%	1,377	3.98%	72.77%	5,779	15,105	13,728	–	–	–	–	–	–	–	–	34,612
P055 Lenggong	Perak	BN (UMNO)	BN (UMNO)	BN (UMNO)	12,588	45.48%	879	3.18%	74.91%	3,382	11,709	12,588	–	–	–	–	–	–	–	–	27,679
P056 Larut	Perak	BN (UMNO)	PN (BERSATU)	PN (BERSATU)	28,350	54.65%	11,598	22.36%	78.93%	6,207	28,350	16,752	–	–	–	–	–	566	–	–	51,875
P057 Parit Buntar	Perak	PH (AMANAH)	PH (AMANAH)	PN (PAS)	23,223	43.90%	5,395	10.20%	77.23%	17,828	23,223	11,593	–	–	–	–	–	259	–	–	52,903
P058 Bagan Serai	Perak	BN (UMNO)	PN (BERSATU)	PN (PAS)	33,753	53.98%	18,551	29.67%	77.88%	13,195	33,753	15,202	–	–	–	–	–	383	–	–	62,533
P059 Bukit Gantang	Perak	BN (UMNO)	PN (BERSATU)	PN (BERSATU)	32,625	45.59%	12,756	17.82%	75.93%	18,565	32,625	19,869	–	–	–	–	–	508	–	–	71,567
P060 Taiping	Perak	PH (DAP)	PH (DAP)	PH (DAP)	47,098	55.56%	25,529	30.12%	69.73%	47,098	21,569	14,599	–	–	–	–	–	1,503	–	–	84,769
P061 Padang Rengas	Perak	BN (UMNO)	BN (UMNO)	PN (BERSATU)	12,931	43.28%	3,046	10.19%	77.23%	7,062	12,931	9,885	–	–	–	–	–	–	–	–	29,878
P062 Sungai Siput	Perak	PH (PKR)	PH (PKR)	PH (PKR)	21,637	41.89%	1,846	3.57%	71.34%	21,637	8,190	19,791	–	–	–	–	–	784	1,247	–	51,649
P063 Tambun	Perak	PH (BERSATU)	PN (BERSATU)	PH (PKR)	49,625	39.77%	3,736	2.99%	77.71%	49,625	45,889	28,140	–	–	–	–	–	1,115	–	–	124,769
P064 Ipoh Timor	Perak	PH (DAP)	PH (DAP)	PH (DAP)	57,549	72.13%	43,888	55.01%	67.51%	57,549	13,661	8,570	–	–	–	–	–	–	–	–	79,780
P065 Ipoh Barat	Perak	PH (DAP)	PH (DAP)	PH (DAP)	63,915	81.57%	56,667	72.31%	68.34%	63,915	6,815	7,248	–	–	–	–	–	–	378	–	78,356
P066 Batu Gajah	Perak	PH (DAP)	PH (DAP)	PH (DAP)	60,999	81.38%	53,836	71.82%	66.99%	60,999	7,163	6,793	–	–	–	–	–	–	–	–	74,955
P067 Kuala Kangsar	Perak	BN (UMNO)	BN (UMNO)	PN (BERSATU)	14,380	40.22%	3,566	9.97%	76.10%	10,356	14,380	10,814	–	–	–	–	–	204	–	–	35,754
P068 Beruas	Perak	PH (DAP)	PH (DAP)	PH (DAP)	46,710	64.72%	33,971	47.07%	66.67%	46,710	12,739	12,724	–	–	–	–	–	–	–	–	72,173
P069 Parie	Perak	BN (UMNO)	BN (UMNO)	PN (PAS)	17,181	45.76%	2,155	5.74%	78.36%	5,063	17,181	15,026	–	–	–	–	–	275	–	–	37,545
P070 Kampar	Perak	PH (DAP)	PH (DAP)	PH (DAP)	30,467	51.30%	14,330	24.13%	66.06%	30,467	12,127	16,137	–	655	–	–	–	–	–	–	59,386
P071 Gopeng	Perak	PH (PKR)	PH (PKR)	PH (PKR)	55,880	53.92%	27,148	26.20%	72.14%	55,880	28,732	18,393	–	633	–	–	–	–	–	–	103,638
P072 Tapah	Perak	BN (MIC)	BN (MIC)	BN (MIC)	18,398	41.36%	5,064	11.38%	71.81%	13,334	12,115	18,398	–	200	–	–	–	335	99	–	44,481
P073 Pasir Salak	Perak	BN (UMNO)	BN (UMNO)	PN (PAS)	24,897	43.66%	5,003	8.77%	75.24%	11,693	24,897	19,894	–	–	–	–	–	539	–	–	57,023
P074 Lumut	Perak	PH (AMANAH)	PH (AMANAH)	PN (BERSATU)	25,212	35.43%	363	0.51%	76.54%	20,358	25,212	24,849	–	358	–	–	–	385	–	–	71,162
P075 Bagan Datuk	Perak	BN (UMNO)	BN (UMNO)	BN (UMNO)	16,578	39.61%	348	0.83%	71.94%	16,230	8,822	16,578	–	–	–	–	–	–	226	–	41,856
P076 Teluk Intan	Perak	PH (DAP)	PH (DAP)	PH (DAP)	33,133	51.61%	15,169	23.63%	73.60%	33,133	17,964	12,304	–	–	–	–	–	793	–	–	64,194
P077 Tanjong Malim	Perak	PH (PKR)	PH (PKR)	PH (PKR)	25,140	36.08%	3,541	5.08%	74.38%	25,140	21,599	20,963	–	–	–	–	–	609	1,360	–	69,671
P078 Cameron Highlands	Pahang	BN (MIC)	BN (UMNO)	BN (UMNO)	16,120	48.46%	4,544	13.66%	72.28%	11,576	5,569	16,120	–	–	–	–	–	–	–	–	33,265
P079 Lipis	Pahang	BN (UMNO)	BN (UMNO)	BN (UMNO)	17,672	49.29%	6,117	17.06%	76.09%	6,336	11,554	17,672	–	–	–	–	–	263	–	–	35,855
P080 Raub	Pahang	PH (DAP)	PH (DAP)	PH (DAP)	21,613	38.43%	4,357	7.75%	74.92%	21,613	17,256	16,939	–	–	–	–	–	427	–	–	56,235
P081 Jerantut	Pahang	BN (UMNO)	BN (UMNO)	PN (PAS)	31,701	47.49%	8,092	12.12%	76.68%	11,444	31,701	23,609	–	–	–	–	–	–	–	–	66,754
P082 Indera Mahkota	Pahang	PH (PKR)	PN (BERSATU)	PN (BERSATU)	41,692	44.65%	8,399	8.99%	77.46%	33,293	41,692	16,530	–	–	–	–	–	1,864	–	–	93,379
P083 Kuantan	Pahang	PH (PKR)	PH (PKR)	PN (PAS)	25,514	37.65%	2,866	4.23%	77.36%	22,648	25,514	19,114	–	–	–	–	–	486	–	–	67,762
P084 Paya Besar	Pahang	BN (UMNO)	BN (UMNO)	BN (UMNO)	26,899	43.40%	1,317	2.12%	77.73%	9,192	25,582	26,899	–	–	–	–	–	310	–	–	61,983
P085 Pekan	Pahang	BN (UMNO)	Vacant	BN (UMNO)	47,418	50.96%	8,949	9.62%	77.90%	6,316	38,469	47,418	–	–	–	–	–	472	366	–	93,041
P086 Maran	Pahang	BN (UMNO)	BN (UMNO)	PN (PAS)	19,600	47.70%	1,821	4.43%	77.35%	3,547	19,600	17,779	–	–	–	–	–	–	166	–	41,092
P087 Kuala Krau	Pahang	BN (UMNO)	BN (UMNO)	PN (PAS)	22,505	47.13%	1,024	2.14%	78.88%	3,593	22,505	21,481	–	–	–	–	–	174	–	–	47,753
P088 Temerloh	Pahang	PH (AMANAH)	PH (AMANAH)	PN (PAS)	30,929	37.43%	5,520	6.68%	77.35%	25,409	30,929	25,191	–	–	–	–	–	1,108	–	–	82,637
P089 Bentong	Pahang	PH (DAP)	Ind	PH (DAP)	25,075	37.62%	692	1.04%	76.57%	25,075	16,233	24,383	–	–	–	–	–	–	966	–	66,657
P090 Bera	Pahang	BN (UMNO)	BN (UMNO)	BN (UMNO)	31,762	53.34%	16,695	28.04%	76.47%	15,067	12,719	31,762	–	–	–	–	–	–	–	–	59,548
P091 Rompin	Pahang	BN (UMNO)	BN (UMNO)	PN (BERSATU)	31,589	47.20%	1,438	2.15%	75.09%	4,779	31,589	30,151	–	–	–	–	–	–	408	–	66,927
P092 Sabak Bernam	Selangor	BN (UMNO)	PN (BERSATU)	PN (BERSATU)	17,973	43.86%	5,056	12.34%	79.40%	9,627	17,973	12,917	–	–	–	–	–	460	–	–	40,977
P093 Sungai Besar	Selangor	PH (BERSATU)	PN (BERSATU)	PN (BERSATU)	19,791	38.75%	2,721	5.33%	79.32%	17,070	19,791	13,984	–	–	–	–	–	225	–	–	51,070
P094 Hulu Selangor	Selangor	PH (PKR)	PH (PKR)	PN (PAS)	46,823	38.24%	1,562	1.28%	79.34%	45,261	46,823	27,050	–	–	–	–	1,013	1,849	446	–	122,442
P095 Tanjong Karang	Selangor	BN (UMNO)	BN (UMNO)	PN (BERSATU)	18,054	35.26%	2,180	4.26%	82.33%	12,314	18,054	15,874	–	–	–	–	–	3,557	1,406	–	51,205
P096 Kuala Selangor	Selangor	PH (AMANAH)	PH (AMANAH)	PH (AMANAH)	31,033	35.88%	1,002	1.16%	84.00%	31,033	23,639	30,031	–	–	–	–	–	1,778	–	–	86,481
P097 Selayang	Selangor	PH (PKR)	PH (PKR)	PH (PKR)	72,773	50.23%	23,619	16.30%	79.81%	72,773	49,154	19,425	–	–	–	–	–	2,584	945	–	144,881
P098 Gombak	Selangor	PH (PKR)	PN (BERSATU)	PH (PKR)	72,267	43.69%	12,729	7.69%	80.01%	72,267	59,538	30,723	–	–	–	–	–	2,223	675	–	165,426
P099 Ampang	Selangor	PH (PKR)	PBM	PH (PKR)	56,754	54.35%	29,681	28.42%	78.23%	56,754	27,073	11,509	–	1,423	–	–	4,589	2,653	429	–	104,430
P100 Pandan	Selangor	PH (PKR)	PH (PKR)	PH (PKR)	74,002	63.98%	48,296	41.76%	77.76%	74,002	25,706	11,664	–	3,323	–	–	–	961	–	–	115,656
P101 Hulu Langat	Selangor	PH (AMANAH)	PH (AMANAH)	PH (AMANAH)	58,382	42.68%	14,896	10.89%	81.96%	58,382	43,486	32,570	–	370	–	–	–	1,655	326	–	136,789
P102 Bangi	Selangor	PH (DAP)	PH (DAP)	PH (DAP)	141,568	57.95%	69,701	28.53%	80.51%	141,568	71,867	25,685	–	–	–	–	–	3,148	1,271	752	244,291
P103 Puchong	Selangor	PH (DAP)	PH (DAP)	PH (DAP)	79,425	65.67%	57,957	47.92%	79.12%	79,425	18,263	21,468	–	–	–	–	–	–	1,793	–	120,949
P104 Subang	Selangor	PH (PKR)	PH (PKR)	PH (PKR)	138,259	77.68%	115,074	64.65%	77.07%	138,259	23,185	16,539	–	–	–	–	–	–	–	–	177,983
P105 Petaling Jaya	Selangor	PH (PKR)	PH (PKR)	PH (PKR)	83,311	57.12%	50,515	34.63%	74.74%	83,311	32,736	23,253	–	–	–	–	–	4,052	461	2,049	145,862
P106 Damansara	Selangor	PH (PKR)	PH (DAP)	PH (DAP)	142,875	81.67%	124,619	71.24%	73.16%	142,875	18,256	13,806	–	–	–	–	–	–	–	–	174,937
P107 Sungai Buloh	Selangor	PH (PKR)	PH (PKR)	PH (PKR)	50,943	39.30%	2,693	2.08%	82.00%	50,943	29,060	48,250	–	–	–	–	–	829	278	279	129,639
P108 Shah Alam	Selangor	PH (AMANAH)	PH (AMANAH)	PH (AMANAH)	61,409	45.23%	18,095	13.33%	81.92%	61,409	43,314	28,266	–	–	–	–	–	2,781	–	–	135,770
P109 Kapar	Selangor	PH (PKR)	PH (PKR)	PN (PAS)	65,751	41.61%	11,782	7.46%	83.45%	53,969	65,751	35,079	–	265	–	–	1,474	1,015	477	–	158,030
P110 Klang	Selangor	PH (DAP)	PH (DAP)	PH (DAP)	115,539	70.49%	91,801	56.01%	78.46%	115,539	23,738	19,762	–	1,140	–	–	–	–	3,455	271	163,905
P111 Kota Raja	Selangor	PH (AMANAH)	PH (AMANAH)	PH (AMANAH)	123,306	62.36%	73,998	37.42%	80.81%	123,306	49,308	22,225	–	–	–	–	–	2,063	478	360	197,740
P112 Kuala Langat	Selangor	PH (PKR)	PBM	PN (PAS)	52,867	42.68%	1,833	1.48%	83.33%	51,034	52,867	18,685	–	–	–	–	–	591	512	171	123,860
P113 Sepang	Selangor	PH (AMANAH)	PH (AMANAH)	PH (AMANAH)	56,264	40.78%	8,949	6.49%	82.10%	56,264	47,315	31,097	–	–	–	–	–	2,337	513	429	137,955
P114 Kepong	Kuala Lumpur	PH (DAP)	PH (DAP)	PH (DAP)	64,308	88.92%	61,081	84.46%	76.70%	64,308	2,795	3,227	–	528	–	–	–	–	1,461	–	72,319
P115 Batu	Kuala Lumpur	Ind	PH (PKR)	PH (PKR)	45,716	52.46%	22,241	25.52%	76.54%	45,716	23,475	10,398	–	575	–	–	–	849	5,996	137	87,146
P116 Wangsa Maju	Kuala Lumpur	PH (PKR)	PH (PKR)	PH (PKR)	46,031	49.63%	20,696	22.32%	77.08%	46,031	25,335	19,595	–	576	–	–	–	987	216	–	92,740
P117 Segambut	Kuala Lumpur	PH (DAP)	PH (DAP)	PH (DAP)	68,438	80.05%	59,684	69.81%	71.45%	68,438	8,754	8,304	–	–	–	–	–	–	–	–	85,496
P118 Setiawangsa	Kuala Lumpur	PH (PKR)	PH (PKR)	PH (PKR)	34,434	46.06%	12,164	16.27%	78.08%	34,434	22,270	16,333	–	–	–	–	–	953	774	–	74,764
P119 Titiwangsa	Kuala Lumpur	PH (BERSATU)	PN (BERSATU)	BN (UMNO)	25,042	41.15%	4,632	7.61%	75.37%	14,518	20,410	25,042	–	–	–	–	–	888	–	–	60,858
P120 Bukit Bintang	Kuala Lumpur	PH (DAP)	PH (DAP)	PH (DAP)	43,827	82.79%	38,977	73.63%	66.35%	43,827	4,259	4,850	–	–	–	–	–	–	–	–	52,936
P121 Lembah Pantai	Kuala Lumpur	PH (PKR)	PH (PKR)	PH (PKR)	35,359	46.09%	13,912	18.13%	75.33%	35,359	19,098	21,447	–	–	–	–	–	810	–	–	76,714
P122 Seputeh	Kuala Lumpur	PH (DAP)	PH (DAP)	PH (DAP)	73,234	83.74%	67,187	76.83%	70.07%	73,234	6,047	6,032	–	–	–	–	–	–	2,141	–	87,454
P123 Cheras	Kuala Lumpur	PH (DAP)	PH (DAP)	PH (DAP)	60,294	84.04%	54,448	75.89%	70.91%	60,294	5,846	5,606	–	–	–	–	–	–	–	–	71,746
P124 Bandar Tun Razak	Kuala Lumpur	PH (PKR)	PN (BERSATU)	PH (PKR)	43,476	46.74%	9,817	10.55%	78.05%	43,476	33,659	15,886	–	–	–	–	–	–	–	–	93,021
P125 Putrajaya	Putrajaya	BN (UMNO)	BN (UMNO)	PN (BERSATU)	16,002	43.67%	2,310	6.30%	85.45%	5,988	16,002	13,692	–	–	–	–	–	878	83	–	36,643
P126 Jelebu	Negeri Sembilan	BN (UMNO)	BN (UMNO)	BN (UMNO)	21,805	48.10%	8,125	17.92%	76.11%	13,680	9,596	21,805	–	–	–	–	–	253	–	–	45,334
P127 Jempol	Negeri Sembilan	BN (UMNO)	BN (UMNO)	BN (UMNO)	30,138	41.98%	5,857	8.16%	74.93%	24,281	16,722	30,138	–	–	–	–	–	654	–	–	71,795
P128 Seremban	Negeri Sembilan	PH (DAP)	PH (DAP)	PH (DAP)	63,916	51.84%	30,841	25.02%	78.40%	63,916	33,075	24,584	–	–	–	–	–	1,336	373	–	123,284
P129 Kuala Pilah	Negeri Sembilan	PH (BERSATU)	PN (BERSATU)	BN (UMNO)	21,423	44.02%	6,483	13.32%	76.94%	14,940	11,560	21,423	–	333	–	–	–	406	–	–	48,662
P130 Rasah	Negeri Sembilan	PH (DAP)	PH (DAP)	PH (DAP)	81,434	68.04%	61,987	51.79%	76.78%	81,434	18,810	19,447	–	–	–	–	–	–	–	–	119,691
P131 Rembau	Negeri Sembilan	BN (UMNO)	BN (UMNO)	BN (UMNO)	53,075	48.50%	19,897	18.18%	81.94%	33,178	21,875	53,075	–	–	–	–	–	529	–	779	109,436
P132 Port Dickson	Negeri Sembilan	PH (PKR)	PH (PKR)	PH (PKR)	42,013	52.40%	23,601	29.43%	76.77%	42,013	18,235	18,412	–	–	–	–	–	1,084	441	–	80,185
P133 Tampin	Negeri Sembilan	PH (AMANAH)	PH (AMANAH)	BN (UMNO)	23,283	38.15%	1,276	2.09%	75.26%	22,007	14,962	23,283	–	–	–	–	–	781	–	–	61,033
P134 Masjid Tanah	Melaka	BN (UMNO)	PN (BERSATU)	PN (BERSATU)	25,604	46.77%	4,411	8.06%	79.15%	7,445	25,604	21,193	–	–	–	–	–	507	–	–	54,749
P135 Alor Gajah	Melaka	PH (BERSATU)	PN (BERSATU)	PH (AMANAH)	28,178	38.60%	890	12.19%	78.23%	28,178	17,211	27,288	–	–	–	–	–	323	–	–	73,000
P136 Tangga Batu	Melaka	PH (PKR)	PH (PKR)	PN (PAS)	37,406	40.65%	8,849	9.62%	79.33%	28,557	37,406	25,095	–	–	–	–	–	702	267	–	92,027
P137 Hang Tuah Jaya	Melaka	PH (PKR)	PH (PKR)	PH (PKR)	39,418	41.72%	8,638	9.14%	79.74%	39,418	23,549	30,780	–	–	–	–	–	739	–	–	94,486
P138 Kota Melaka	Melaka	PH (DAP)	PH (DAP)	PH (DAP)	73,995	60.07%	46,420	37.68%	75.05%	73,995	27,575	20,686	–	–	–	–	–	–	925	–	123,181
P139 Jasin	Melaka	BN (UMNO)	BN (UMNO)	PN (PAS)	27,893	35.95%	322	0.41%	80.66%	21,674	27,893	27,571	–	–	–	–	–	460	–	–	77,598
P140 Segamat	Johor	PH (PKR)	PBM	PH (PKR)	23,437	46.27%	5,669	11.19%	73.03%	23,437	8,385	17,768	–	–	–	–	–	1,062	–	–	50,652
P141 Sekijang	Johor	PH (PKR)	PH (PKR)	PH (PKR)	18,941	39.27%	1,734	3.59%	75.39%	18,941	11,612	17,207	–	339	–	–	–	138	–	–	48,237
P142 Labis	Johor	PH (DAP)	PH (DAP)	PH (DAP)	16,133	46.43%	2,833	8.15%	69.70%	16,133	5,312	13,300	–	–	–	–	–	–	–	–	34,745
P143 Pagoh	Johor	PH (BERSATU)	PN (BERSATU)	PN (BERSATU)	24,986	45.94%	10,007	18.40%	77.77%	14,979	24,986	14,426	–	–	–	–	–	–	–	–	54,391
P144 Ledang	Johor	PH (PKR)	PH (PKR)	PH (PKR)	33,650	41.90%	9,769	12.16%	76.79%	33,650	22,292	23,881	–	–	–	–	–	269	215	–	80,307
P145 Bakri	Johor	PH (PKR)	PH (PKR)	PH (PKR)	36,636	50.09%	19,254	26.32%	75.14%	36,636	17,222	17,382	–	–	–	–	–	–	1,900	–	73,140
P146 Muar	Johor	PH (BERSATU)	MUDA	MUDA	19,961	37.55%	1,345	2.53%	77.12%	19,961	18,616	14,581	–	–	–	–	–	–	–	–	53,158
P147 Parit Sulong	Johor	BN (UMNO)	BN (UMNO)	BN (UMNO)	25,740	40.89%	2,021	3.21%	79.20%	13,495	23,719	25,740	–	–	–	–	–	–	–	–	62,954
P148 Ayer Hitam	Johor	BN (MCA)	BN (MCA)	BN (MCA)	18,911	40.50%	2,963	6.35%	76.49%	15,948	11,833	18,911	–	–	–	–	–	–	–	–	46,692
P149 Sri Gading	Johor	PH (BERSATU)	GTA (PEJUANG)	PH (AMANAH)	23,242	37.94%	4,000	6.53%	77.94%	23,242	18,475	19,242	–	–	–	–	–	305	–	–	61,264
P150 Batu Pahat	Johor	PH (PKR)	PN (BERSATU)	PH (PKR)	45,242	45.47%	15,972	16.05%	74.30%	45,242	29,270	24,309	–	–	–	–	–	410	–	263	99,494
P151 Simpang Renggam	Johor	PH (BERSATU)	PH (PKR)	BN (UMNO)	18,312	41.49%	1,821	4.13%	74.76%	16,491	9,077	18,312	–	–	–	–	–	251	–	–	44,131
P152 Kluang	Johor	PH (DAP)	PH (DAP)	PH (DAP)	49,801	52.08%	26,406	27.62%	72.25%	49,801	22,021	23,395	–	–	–	–	–	–	404	–	95,621
P153 Sembrong	Johor	BN (UMNO)	BN (UMNO)	BN (UMNO)	22,572	55.15%	10,880	26.58%	74.44%	11,692	22,572	6,666	–	–	–	–	–	–	–	–	40,930
P154 Mersing	Johor	BN (UMNO)	PN (BERSATU)	PN (BERSATU)	21,066	44.91%	2,337	4.98%	70.77%	6,813	21,066	18,729	–	–	–	–	–	209	89	–	46,906
P155 Tenggara	Johor	BN (UMNO)	BN (UMNO)	BN (UMNO)	21,185	41.26%	2,991	5.82%	76.31%	11,618	18,194	21,185	–	–	–	–	–	353	–	–	51,350
P156 Kota Tinggi	Johor	BN (UMNO)	BN (UMNO)	BN (UMNO)	25,410	53.68%	8,390	17.73%	77.23%	4,903	17,020	25,410	–	–	–	–	–	–	–	–	47,333
P157 Pengerang	Johor	BN (UMNO)	BN (UMNO)	BN (UMNO)	21,738	51.96%	5,010	11.97%	75.64%	3,374	16,728	21,738	–	–	–	–	–	–	–	–	41,840
P158 Tebrau	Johor	PH (PKR)	PBM	PH (PKR)	83,959	49.99%	30,720	18.29%	75.22%	83,959	53,239	30,767	–	–	–	–	–	–	–	–	167,965
P159 Pasir Gudang	Johor	PH (PKR)	PH (PKR)	PH (PKR)	71,223	47.71%	31,558	21.14%	75.21%	71,223	39,675	27,369	–	–	–	–	–	1,003	–	–	149,280
P160 Johor Bahru	Johor	PH (PKR)	PH (PKR)	PH (PKR)	43,252	45.82%	16,041	16.99%	69.22%	43,252	22,075	27,211	–	–	–	–	–	1,855	–	–	94,393
P161 Pulai	Johor	PH (AMANAH)	PH (AMANAH)	PH (AMANAH)	64,900	55.33%	33,174	28.28%	70.96%	64,900	20,677	31,726	–	–	–	–	–	–	–	–	117,303
P162 Iskandar Puteri	Johor	PH (DAP)	PH (DAP)	PH (DAP)	96,819	59.15%	60,036	36.68%	73.58%	96,819	30,078	36,783	–	–	–	–	–	–	–	–	163,680
P163 Kulai	Johor	PH (DAP)	PH (DAP)	PH (DAP)	65,529	56.86%	36,023	31.26%	76.20%	65,529	20,218	29,506	–	–	–	–	–	–	–	–	115,253
P164 Pontian	Johor	BN (UMNO)	BN (UMNO)	BN (UMNO)	23,201	40.81%	5,758	10.13%	75.59%	15,901	17,443	23,201	–	–	–	–	–	306	–	–	56,851
P165 Tanjung Piai	Johor	PH (BERSATU)	BN (MCA)	BN (MCA)	23,593	43.22%	6,360	11.65%	77.23%	17,233	13,762	23,593	–	–	–	–	–	–	–	–	54,588
P166 Labuan	Labuan	BN (UMNO)	WARISAN	PN (BERSATU)	8,124	28.56%	708	2.49%	75.24%	5,307	8,124	7,416	–	7,310	–	–	202	90	–	–	28,449
P167 Kudat	Sabah	BN (UMNO)	GRS (BERSATU Sabah)	Ind	16,323	36.19%	1,967	4.36%	59.57%	4,726	–	–	–	9,421	14,356	–	–	282	16,323	–	45,108
P168 Kota Marudu	Sabah	BN (PBS)	GRS (PBS)	KDM	24,318	48.69%	8,174	16.37%	61.86%	3,225	–	–	–	5,320	16,144	24,318	–	279	660	–	49,946
P169 Kota Belud	Sabah	WARISAN	WARISAN	WARISAN	25,148	46.54%	4,582	8.48%	67.64%	8,323	–	20,566	–	25,148	–	–	–	–	–	–	54,037
P170 Tuaran	Sabah	BN (UPKO)	PH (UPKO)	PH (UPKO)	24,943	42.80%	233	0.40%	69.86%	24,943	–	–	–	24,710	5,728	–	–	445	2,401	–	58,277
P171 Sepanggar	Sabah	WARISAN	WARISAN	PH (PKR)	27,022	38.44%	7,042	10.02%	64.87%	27,022	–	19,980	–	18,594	–	3,977	–	731	–	–	70,304
P172 Kota Kinabalu	Sabah	PH (DAP)	PH (DAP)	PH (DAP)	31,359	71.08%	23,783	53.91%	59.57%	31,359	–	–	–	7,576	4,592	456	–	–	137	–	44,120
P173 Putatan	Sabah	PH (PKR)	PH (PKR)	BN (UMNO)	16,234	39.36%	124	0.30%	65.30%	16,110	–	16,234	–	8,511	–	–	–	394	–	–	41,249
P174 Penampang	Sabah	WARISAN	WARISAN	PH (UPKO)	29,066	57.30%	14,410	28.41%	65.70%	29,066	–	–	–	14,656	6,719	–	–	–	289	–	50,730
P175 Papar	Sabah	WARISAN	WARISAN	GRS (BERSATU Sabah)	22,620	51.99%	12,224	28.10%	72.59%	9,144	–	–	–	10,396	22,620	–	–	783	566	–	43,509
P176 Kimanis	Sabah	BN (UMNO)	BN (UMNO)	BN (UMNO)	13,004	41.86%	3,037	9.78%	76.22%	3,931	–	13,004	–	9,967	–	4,013	–	153	–	–	31,068
P177 Beaufort	Sabah	BN (UMNO)	GRS (BERSATU Sabah)	BN (UMNO)	10,570	36.08%	2,518	8.59%	67.74%	7,835	–	10,570	–	2,152	–	7,835	–	–	689	–	29,298
P178 Sipitang	Sabah	BN (UMNO)	GRS (BERSATU Sabah)	GRS (BERSATU Sabah)	14,459	49.75%	4,691	16.14%	63.35%	4,834	–	–	–	9,768	14,459	–	–	–	–	–	29,061
P179 Ranau	Sabah	PH (PKR)	GRS (BERSATU Sabah)	GRS (BERSATU Sabah)	22,606	53.44%	11,092	26.22%	63.59%	11,514	–	4,254	–	2,657	22,606	–	–	1,267	–	–	42,298
P180 Keningau	Sabah	USA (STAR)	GRS (STAR)	GRS (STAR)	23,155	42.20%	8,056	14.68%	62.65%	15,099	–	–	–	7,020	23,155	–	9,598	–	–	–	54,872
P181 Tenom	Sabah	PH (DAP)	PH (DAP)	Ind	10,027	35.00%	1,108	3.87%	68.14%	8,919	–	8,625	–	992	–	–	–	–	10,113	–	28,649
P182 Pensiangan	Sabah	BN (PBRS)	BN (PBRS)	BN (PBRS)	19,623	52.89%	5,412	14.59%	66.64%	14,211	–	19,623	–	1,512	–	1,640	–	124	–	–	37,100
P183 Beluran	Sabah	BN (UMNO)	GRS (BERSATU Sabah)	PN (BERSATU)	11,303	67.23%	1,594	49.62%	76.86%	4,460	11,303	9,709	–	3,707	–	–	–	155	–	–	29,334
P184 Libaran	Sabah	BN (UMNO)	GRS (BERSATU Sabah)	BN (UMNO)	22,969	51.58%	12,618	28.34%	61.56%	10,351	–	22,969	–	9,185	–	–	–	826	659	541	44,531
P185 Batu Sapi	Sabah	WARISAN	Vacant	GRS (BERSATU Sabah)	12,152	44.95%	4,821	17.83%	61.57%	7,331	–	–	–	7,218	12,152	–	–	176	160	–	27,037
P186 Sandakan	Sabah	PH (DAP)	PH (DAP)	PH (DAP)	16,673	53.92%	11,031	35.68%	55.67%	16,673	–	–	–	5,642	5,054	–	–	–	3,550	–	30,919
P187 Kinabatangan	Sabah	BN (UMNO)	BN (UMNO)	BN (UMNO)	16,842	57.38%	4,330	14.75%	65.56%	–	–	16,842	–	12,512	–	–	–	–	–	–	29,354
P188 Lahad Datu	Sabah	WARISAN	PBM	WARISAN	27,116	46.64%	4,376	7.53%	58.00%	8,289	–	22,740	–	27,116	–	–	–	–	–	–	58,145
P189 Semporna	Sabah	WARISAN	WARISAN	WARISAN	28,702	73.77%	20,810	53.48%	53.91%	1,848	–	–	–	28,702	7,892	–	–	467	–	–	38,909
P190 Tawau	Sabah	PH (PKR)	PH (PKR)	GRS (PBS)	19,865	39.19%	3,860	7.62%	57.94%	16,065	–	–	–	11,263	19,865	–	–	1,067	2,427	–	50,687
P191 Kalabakan	Sabah	WARISAN	WARISAN	BN (UMNO)	23,855	47.68%	9,100	18.19%	59.58%	9,398	–	23,855	–	14,755	–	–	–	1,681	341	–	50,030
P192 Mas Gading	Sarawak	PH (DAP)	PH (DAP)	PH (DAP)	17,274	55.05%	5,480	17.46%	66.52%	17,274	–	–	11,794	–	–	–	–	–	–	2,311	31,379
P193 Santubong	Sarawak	BN (PBB)	GPS (PBB)	GPS (PBB)	43,739	84.42%	38,681	74.66%	75.24%	5,058	–	–	43,739	–	–	–	–	–	3,012	–	51,809
P194 Petra Jaya	Sarawak	BN (PBB)	GPS (PBB)	GPS (BBB)	54,745	79.15%	41,363	59.81%	62.98%	13,382	–	–	54,745	–	–	–	–	–	–	1,036	69,163
P195 Bandar Kuching	Sarawak	PH (DAP)	PH (DAP)	PH (DAP)	45,353	71.34%	28,891	45.44%	57.95%	45,353	–	–	16,462	–	–	–	–	–	–	1,760	63,575
P196 Stampin	Sarawak	PH (DAP)	PH (DAP)	PH (DAP)	39,310	53.30%	7,158	9.71%	60.95%	39,310	–	–	32,152	–	–	–	–	–	–	2,291	73,753
P197 Kota Samarahan	Sarawak	BN (PBB)	GPS (PBB)	GPS (PBB)	42,278	76.71%	29,445	53.43%	75.07%	12,833	–	–	42,278	–	–	–	–	–	–	–	55,111
P198 Puncak Borneo	Sarawak	PH (PKR)	GPS (PBB)	GPS (PBB)	29,457	57.58%	13,338	26.07%	63.97%	16,119	–	–	29,457	–	–	–	–	–	–	–	51,154
P199 Serian	Sarawak	BN (SUPP)	GPS (SUPP)	GPS (SUPP)	22,876	61.24%	16,697	41.77%	61.24%	5,289	–	–	22,876	–	–	–	–	–	6,179	5,630	39,974
P200 Batang Sadong	Sarawak	BN (PBB)	GPS (PBB)	GPS (BBB)	18,668	84.07%	14,893	66.36%	68.76%	3,775	–	–	18,668	–	–	–	–	–	–	–	22,443
P201 Batang Lupar	Sarawak	BN (PBB)	GPS (PBB)	GPS (PBB)	19,627	71.22%	14,463	52.48%	63.98%	2,768	5,163	–	19,627	–	–	–	–	–	–	–	27,559
P202 Sri Aman	Sarawak	BN (PRS)	Ind	GPS (PRS)	14,131	44.27%	4,039	12.65%	63.63%	2,021	–	–	14,131	–	–	–	–	–	5,673	–	31,917
P203 Lubok Antu	Sarawak	Ind	PN (BERSATU)	GPS (PRS)	6,644	34.44%	100	0.52%	66.54%	746	5,360	–	6,644	–	–	–	–	–	–	6,544	19,294
P204 Betong	Sarawak	BN (PBB)	GPS (PBB)	GPS (PBB)	16,479	61.69%	11,302	42.31%	63.99%	5,177	–	–	16,479	–	–	–	–	–	5,057	–	26,713
P205 Saratok	Sarawak	PH (PKR)	PN (BERSATU)	PN (BERSATU)	19,233	62.36%	8,826	28.62%	69.26%	1,221	19,233	–	10,397	–	–	–	–	–	–	–	30,841
P206 Tanjong Manis	Sarawak	BN (PBB)	GPS (PBB)	GPS (PBB)	16,474	86.52%	13,908	73.05%	57.79%	2,566	–	–	16,474	–	–	–	–	–	–	–	19,040
P207 Igan	Sarawak	BN (PBB)	GPS (PBB)	GPS (PBB)	15,824	93.16%	14,662	86.32%	60.04%	1,162	–	–	15,824	–	–	–	–	–	–	–	16,986
P208 Sarikei	Sarawak	PH (DAP)	PH (DAP)	GPS (SUPP)	20,080	55.07%	3,697	10.14%	66.27%	16,383	–	–	20,080	–	–	–	–	–	–	–	36,463
P209 Julau	Sarawak	Ind	PBM	PBM	9,159	40.64%	1,340	5.95%	64.67%	–	–	–	7,819	–	–	–	9,159	–	5,224	335	22,537
P210 Kanowit	Sarawak	BN (PRS)	GPS (PRS)	GPS (PRS)	7,411	41.14%	236	1.31%	58.23%	7,175	–	–	7,411	–	–	–	–	–	3,457	–	18,043
P211 Lanang	Sarawak	PH (DAP)	PH (DAP)	PH (DAP)	30,120	56.89%	11,544	21.80%	60.61%	30,120	–	–	18,576	–	–	–	–	–	587	3,663	52,946
P212 Sibu	Sarawak	PH (DAP)	PH (DAP)	PH (DAP)	31,827	48.27%	7,760	11.77%	62.28%	31,827	–	–	23,527	–	–	–	–	–	–	11,128	65,942
P213 Mukah	Sarawak	BN (PBB)	GPS (PBB)	GPS (PBB)	21,733	78.23%	15,686	56.47%	59.15%	6,047	–	–	21,733	–	–	–	–	–	–	–	27,780
P214 Selangau	Sarawak	PH (PKR)	PERKASA (PSB)	GPS (PRS)	16,078	55.83%	4,986	17.31%	62.95%	11,092	–	–	16,078	–	–	–	–	–	1,626	–	28,796
P215 Kapit	Sarawak	BN (PBB)	GPS (PBB)	GPS (PBB)	16,522	75.10%	12,402	56.38%	48.66%	4,120	–	–	16,522	–	–	–	–	–	–	1,357	21,999
P216 Hulu Rajang	Sarawak	GPS (PRS)	GPS (PRS)	GPS (PRS)	15,456	66.03%	7,505	32.06%	53.89%	7,951	–	–	15,456	–	–	–	–	–	–	–	23,407
P217 Bintulu	Sarawak	BN (PDP)	GPS (PDP)	GPS (PDP)	43,455	61.73%	22,168	31.49%	61.97%	21,287	5,650	–	43,455	–	–	–	–	–	–	–	70,392
P218 Sibuti	Sarawak	BN (PBB)	GPS (PBB)	GPS (PBB)	22,150	65.31%	11,745	34.63%	57.95%	10,405	–	–	22,150	–	–	–	–	–	–	1,361	33,916
P219 Miri	Sarawak	PH (PKR)	PH (PKR)	PH (PKR)	39,549	50.61%	6,159	7.88%	54.56%	39,549	–	–	33,390	–	–	–	–	–	–	5,209	78,148
P220 Baram	Sarawak	BN (PDP)	GPS (PDP)	GPS (PDP)	18,399	61.78%	7,339	24.64%	50.03%	11,060	–	–	18,399	–	–	–	–	–	324	–	29,783
P221 Limbang	Sarawak	BN (PBB)	GPS (PBB)	GPS (PBB)	14,897	75.25%	9,998	50.51%	47.13%	4,899	–	–	14,897	–	–	–	–	–	–	–	19,796
P222 Lawas	Sarawak	BN (PBB)	GPS (PBB)	GPS (PBB)	11,361	62.40%	5,677	31.18%	54.10%	1,163	–	–	–	–	–	–	–	–	5,684	–	18,208

== Perlis ==
#	Constituency	Registered Electors	Winner	Votes	Votes %	Majority	Opponent(s)	Votes	Votes %	Total valid votes	Incumbent
PN 3 | BN 0 | PH 0 | GTA 0 | WARISAN 0 | Independent 0
P001	Padang Besar	60,192	Rusydan Rusmi (PN-PAS)	24,267	53.58%	12,514	Zahida Zarik Khan (BN–UMNO)	11,753	25.95%	45,288	Zahidi Zainul Abidin (BN–UMNO)
P001	Padang Besar	60,192	Rusydan Rusmi (PN-PAS)	24,267	53.58%	12,514	Mohd Saat @ Yahya (PH–AMANAH)	7,085	15.64%	45,288	Zahidi Zainul Abidin (BN–UMNO)
P001	Padang Besar	60,192	Rusydan Rusmi (PN-PAS)	24,267	53.58%	12,514	Zahidi Zainul Abidin (IND)	1,939	4.28%	45,288	Zahidi Zainul Abidin (BN–UMNO)
P001	Padang Besar	60,192	Rusydan Rusmi (PN-PAS)	24,267	53.58%	12,514	Ko Chu Liang (WARISAN)	244	0.54%	45,288	Zahidi Zainul Abidin (BN–UMNO)
P002	Kangar	74,859	Zakri Hassan (PN-BERSATU)	24,562	43.70%	9,192	Fathul Bari Mat Jahya (BN–UMNO)	15,370	27.35%	56,200	Noor Amin Ahmad (PH–PKR)
P002	Kangar	74,859	Zakri Hassan (PN-BERSATU)	24,562	43.70%	9,192	Noor Amin Ahmad (PH–PKR)	15,143	26.94%	56,200	Noor Amin Ahmad (PH–PKR)
P002	Kangar	74,859	Zakri Hassan (PN-BERSATU)	24,562	43.70%	9,192	Nur Sulaiman Zolkapli (GTA–PEJUANG)	708	1.26%	56,200	Noor Amin Ahmad (PH–PKR)
P002	Kangar	74,859	Zakri Hassan (PN-BERSATU)	24,562	43.70%	9,192	Rohimi Shapiee (WARISAN)	417	0.74%	56,200	Noor Amin Ahmad (PH–PKR)
P003	Arau	60,876	Shahidan Kassim (PN-PAS)	31,458	67.23%	23,216	Rozabil Abd Rahman (BN–UMNO)	8,242	17.62%	46,789	Shahidan Kassim (BN–UMNO)
P003	Arau	60,876	Shahidan Kassim (PN-PAS)	31,458	67.23%	23,216	Fathin Amelina Fazlie (PH–PKR)	7,089	15.15%	46,789	Shahidan Kassim (BN–UMNO)

== Kedah ==
#	Constituency	Registered Electors	Winner	Votes	Votes %	Majority	Opponent(s)	Votes	Votes %	Total valid votes	Incumbent
PN 14 | PH 1 | BN 0 | GTA 0 | WARISAN 0 | PRM 0 | Independent 0
P004	Langkawi	66,777	Suhaimi Abdullah (PN-BERSATU)	25,463	53.63%	13,518	Armishah Siraj (BN–UMNO)	11,945	25.16%	47,480	Mahathir Mohamad (GTA–PEJUANG)
P004	Langkawi	66,777	Suhaimi Abdullah (PN-BERSATU)	25,463	53.63%	13,518	Zabidi Yahya (PH–AMANAH)	5,417	11.41%	47,480	Mahathir Mohamad (GTA–PEJUANG)
P004	Langkawi	66,777	Suhaimi Abdullah (PN-BERSATU)	25,463	53.63%	13,518	Mahathir Mohamad (GTA–PEJUANG)	4,566	9.62%	47,480	Mahathir Mohamad (GTA–PEJUANG)
P004	Langkawi	66,777	Suhaimi Abdullah (PN-BERSATU)	25,463	53.63%	13,518	Abd Kadir (IND)	89	0.19%	47,480	Mahathir Mohamad (GTA–PEJUANG)
P005	Jerlun	67,601	Abdul Ghani Ahmad (PN–PAS)	31,685	60.69%	20,456	Othman Aziz (BN–UMNO)	11,229	21.51%	52,207	Mukhriz Mahathir (GTA–PEJUANG)
P005	Jerlun	67,601	Abdul Ghani Ahmad (PN–PAS)	31,685	60.69%	20,456	Mohamed Fadzil Mohd Ali (PH–PKR)	6,149	11.78%	52,207	Mukhriz Mahathir (GTA–PEJUANG)
P005	Jerlun	67,601	Abdul Ghani Ahmad (PN–PAS)	31,685	60.69%	20,456	Mukhriz Mahathir (GTA–PEJUANG)	3,144	6.02%	52,207	Mukhriz Mahathir (GTA–PEJUANG)
P006	Kubang Pasu	108,217	Ku Abdul Rahman Ku Ismail (PN–BERSATU)	47,584	57.05%	31,584	Aizuddin Ariffin (PH–PKR)	16,000	19.18%	83,402	Amiruddin Hamzah (GTA–PEJUANG)
P006	Kubang Pasu	108,217	Ku Abdul Rahman Ku Ismail (PN–BERSATU)	47,584	57.05%	31,584	Hasmuni Hassan (BN–UMNO)	14,489	17.37%	83,402	Amiruddin Hamzah (GTA–PEJUANG)
P006	Kubang Pasu	108,217	Ku Abdul Rahman Ku Ismail (PN–BERSATU)	47,584	57.05%	31,584	Amiruddin Hamzah (GTA–PEJUANG)	5,329	6.39%	83,402	Amiruddin Hamzah (GTA–PEJUANG)
P007	Padang Terap	59,806	Nurul Amin Hamid (PN-PAS)	28,217	58.03%	10,959	Mahdzir Khalid (BN–UMNO)	17,258	35.49%	48,629	Mahdzir Khalid (BN–UMNO)
P007	Padang Terap	59,806	Nurul Amin Hamid (PN-PAS)	28,217	58.03%	10,959	Muaz Abdullah (PH–AMANAH)	2,702	5.56%	48,629	Mahdzir Khalid (BN–UMNO)
P007	Padang Terap	59,806	Nurul Amin Hamid (PN-PAS)	28,217	58.03%	10,959	Razali Lebai Salleh (GTA–PEJUANG)	452	0.93%	48,629	Mahdzir Khalid (BN–UMNO)
P008	Pokok Sena	114,838	Ahmad Saad Yahaya (PN-PAS)	52,275	59.44%	31,751	Mahfuz Omar (PH–AMANAH)	20,524	23.34%	87,944	Mahfuz Omar (PH–AMANAH)
P008	Pokok Sena	114,838	Ahmad Saad Yahaya (PN-PAS)	52,275	59.44%	31,751	Noran Zamini Jamaluddin (BN–UMNO)	14,523	16.51%	87,944	Mahfuz Omar (PH–AMANAH)
P008	Pokok Sena	114,838	Ahmad Saad Yahaya (PN-PAS)	52,275	59.44%	31,751	Noraini Md Salleh (WARISAN)	622	0.71%	87,944	Mahfuz Omar (PH–AMANAH)
P009	Alor Setar	105,994	Afnan Hamimi Taib Azamuddin (PN-PAS)	37,486	48.69%	9,931	Simon Ooi Tze Min (PH–PKR)	27,555	35.79%	76,986	Chan Ming Kai (PH–PKR)
P009	Alor Setar	105,994	Afnan Hamimi Taib Azamuddin (PN-PAS)	37,486	48.69%	9,931	Tan Chee Heong (BN–MCA)	8,930	11.60%	76,986	Chan Ming Kai (PH–PKR)
P009	Alor Setar	105,994	Afnan Hamimi Taib Azamuddin (PN-PAS)	37,486	48.69%	9,931	Mohd Nuhairi Rahmat (GTA–PEJUANG)	2,383	3.10%	76,986	Chan Ming Kai (PH–PKR)
P009	Alor Setar	105,994	Afnan Hamimi Taib Azamuddin (PN-PAS)	37,486	48.69%	9,931	Fadzli Hanafi (WARISAN)	366	0.48%	76,986	Chan Ming Kai (PH–PKR)
P009	Alor Setar	105,994	Afnan Hamimi Taib Azamuddin (PN-PAS)	37,486	48.69%	9,931	Sofan Feroza (IND)	151	0.20%	76,986	Chan Ming Kai (PH–PKR)
P009	Alor Setar	105,994	Afnan Hamimi Taib Azamuddin (PN-PAS)	37,486	48.69%	9,931	Nordin Yunus (IND)	115	0.15%	76,986	Chan Ming Kai (PH–PKR)
P010	Kuala Kedah	132,500	Ahmad Fakhruddin Fakhrurazi (PN-PAS)	56,298	56.03%	28,061	Azman Ismail (PH–PKR)	28,237	28.10%	100,475	Azman Ismail (PH–PKR)
P010	Kuala Kedah	132,500	Ahmad Fakhruddin Fakhrurazi (PN-PAS)	56,298	56.03%	28,061	Mashitah Ibrahim (BN–UMNO)	13,879	13.81%	100,475	Azman Ismail (PH–PKR)
P010	Kuala Kedah	132,500	Ahmad Fakhruddin Fakhrurazi (PN-PAS)	56,298	56.03%	28,061	Ulya Aqamah Husamudin (GTA–PEJUANG)	1,805	1.80%	100,475	Azman Ismail (PH–PKR)
P010	Kuala Kedah	132,500	Ahmad Fakhruddin Fakhrurazi (PN-PAS)	56,298	56.03%	28,061	Syed Araniri Syed Ahmad (WARISAN)	256	0.25%	100,475	Azman Ismail (PH–PKR)
P011	Pendang	94,547	Awang Hashim (PN-PAS)	49,008	64.83%	31,289	Suraya Yaacob (BN–UMNO)	17,719	23.44%	75,594	Awang Hashim (PN–PAS)
P011	Pendang	94,547	Awang Hashim (PN-PAS)	49,008	64.83%	31,289	Zulkifly Mohamad (PH–PKR)	8,058	10.66%	75,594	Awang Hashim (PN–PAS)
P011	Pendang	94,547	Awang Hashim (PN-PAS)	49,008	64.83%	31,289	Abdul Rashid Yub (GTA–GB)	809	1.07%	75,594	Awang Hashim (PN–PAS)
P012	Jerai	105,001	Sabri Azit (PN-PAS)	49,461	60.10%	33,192	Jamil Khir Baharom (BN–UMNO)	16,269	19.77%	82,293	Sabri Azit (PN-PAS)
P012	Jerai	105,001	Sabri Azit (PN-PAS)	49,461	60.10%	33,192	Zulhazmi Shariff (PH–DAP)	15,590	18.94%	82,293	Sabri Azit (PN-PAS)
P012	Jerai	105,001	Sabri Azit (PN-PAS)	49,461	60.10%	33,192	Mohd Nizam Mahsyar (GTA–GB)	973	1.18%	82,293	Sabri Azit (PN-PAS)
P013	Sik	63,126	Ahmad Tarmizi Sulaiman (PN-PAS)	34,606	67.64%	21,787	Maizatulakmam Othman @ Ibrahim (BN–UMNO)	12,819	25.06%	51,161	Ahmad Tarmizi Sulaiman (PN-PAS)
P013	Sik	63,126	Ahmad Tarmizi Sulaiman (PN-PAS)	34,606	67.64%	21,787	Latifah Mohammad Yatim (PH–AMANAH)	3,736	7.30%	51,161	Ahmad Tarmizi Sulaiman (PN-PAS)
P014	Merbok	132,444	Nazri Abu Hassan (PN-BERSATU)	52,573	51.27%	21,019	Nor Azrina Surip (PH–PKR)	31,554	30.77%	102,544	Nor Azrina Surip (PH–PKR)
P014	Merbok	132,444	Nazri Abu Hassan (PN-BERSATU)	52,573	51.27%	21,019	Shaiful Hazizy Zainol Abidin (BN–UMNO)	16,691	16.28%	102,544	Nor Azrina Surip (PH–PKR)
P014	Merbok	132,444	Nazri Abu Hassan (PN-BERSATU)	52,573	51.27%	21,019	Mohd Mosin Abdul Razak (GTA–IMAN)	1,201	1.17%	102,544	Nor Azrina Surip (PH–PKR)
P014	Merbok	132,444	Nazri Abu Hassan (PN-BERSATU)	52,573	51.27%	21,019	Khairul Anuar Ahmad (WARISAN)	525	0.51%	102,544	Nor Azrina Surip (PH–PKR)
P015	Sungai Petani	168,847	Mohammed Taufiq Johari (PH–PKR)	50,580	38.91%	1,115	Robert Ling Kui Ee (PN-BERSATU)	49,465	38.05%	130,004	Johari Abdul (PH–PKR)
P015	Sungai Petani	168,847	Mohammed Taufiq Johari (PH–PKR)	50,580	38.91%	1,115	Shahanim Mohamad Yusoff (BN–UMNO)	27,391	21.07%	130,004	Johari Abdul (PH–PKR)
P015	Sungai Petani	168,847	Mohammed Taufiq Johari (PH–PKR)	50,580	38.91%	1,115	Marzuki Yahya (GTA-PEJUANG)	2,342	1.80%	130,004	Johari Abdul (PH–PKR)
P015	Sungai Petani	168,847	Mohammed Taufiq Johari (PH–PKR)	50,580	38.91%	1,115	Tan Chow Kang (PRM)	226	0.17%	130,004	Johari Abdul (PH–PKR)
P016	Baling	132,099	Hassan Saad (PN–PAS)	64,493	59.13%	29,137	Abdul Azeez Abdul Rahim (BN–UMNO)	35,356	32.42%	109,068	Abdul Azeez Abdul Rahim (BN–UMNO)
P016	Baling	132,099	Hassan Saad (PN–PAS)	64,493	59.13%	29,137	Johari Abdullah (PH–AMANAH)	8,636	7.92%	109,068	Abdul Azeez Abdul Rahim (BN–UMNO)
P016	Baling	132,099	Hassan Saad (PN–PAS)	64,493	59.13%	29,137	Bashir Abdul Rahman (GTA–PUTRA)	579	0.53%	109,068	Abdul Azeez Abdul Rahim (BN–UMNO)
P017	Padang Serai	133,867	Azman Nasrudin (PN-BERSATU)	51,637	56.49%	16,260	Mohamad Sofee Razak (PH–PKR)	35,377	38.70%	81,416	Karupaiya Mutusamik (PH–PKR)
P017	Padang Serai	133,867	Azman Nasrudin (PN-BERSATU)	51,637	56.49%	16,260	Sivarraajh Chandran (BN–MIC)	2,983	3.26%	81,416	Karupaiya Mutusamik (PH–PKR)
P017	Padang Serai	133,867	Azman Nasrudin (PN-BERSATU)	51,637	56.49%	16,260	Sreanandha Rao (IND)	846	0.93%	81,416	Karupaiya Mutusamik (PH–PKR)
P017	Padang Serai	133,867	Azman Nasrudin (PN-BERSATU)	51,637	56.49%	16,260	Hamzah Abdul Rahman (GTA–PUTRA)	424	0.46%	81,416	Karupaiya Mutusamik (PH–PKR)
P017	Padang Serai	133,867	Azman Nasrudin (PN-BERSATU)	51,637	56.49%	16,260	Mohd Bakri Hashim (WARISAN)	149	0.16%	81,416	Karupaiya Mutusamik (PH–PKR)
P018	Kulim-Bandar Baharu	90,141	Roslan Hashim (PN-BERSATU)	34,469	49.00%	13,061	Saifuddin Nasution Ismail (PH–PKR)	21,408	30.44%	70,340	Saifuddin Nasution Ismail (PH–PKR)
P018	Kulim-Bandar Baharu	90,141	Roslan Hashim (PN-BERSATU)	34,469	49.00%	13,061	Muhar Hussain (BN–UMNO)	13,872	19.72%	70,340	Saifuddin Nasution Ismail (PH–PKR)
P018	Kulim-Bandar Baharu	90,141	Roslan Hashim (PN-BERSATU)	34,469	49.00%	13,061	Muhamad Yusrizal Yusuf (GTA–GB)	591	0.84%	70,340	Saifuddin Nasution Ismail (PH–PKR)

== Kelantan ==
#	Constituency	Registered Electors	Winner	Votes	Votes %	Majority	Opponent(s)	Votes	Votes %	Total valid votes	Incumbent
PN 14 | BN 0 | PH 0 | GTA 0 | PRM 0 | Independent 0
P019	Tumpat	149,371	Mumtaz Md. Nawi (PN–PAS)	65,426	62.51%	34,793	Che Abdullah Mat Nawi (BN–UMNO)	30,633	29.27%	106,131	Che Abdullah Mat Nawi (PN–PAS)
P019	Tumpat	149,371	Mumtaz Md. Nawi (PN–PAS)	65,426	62.51%	34,793	Wan Ahmad Johari Wan Omar (PH–AMANAH)	7,762	7.42%	106,131	Che Abdullah Mat Nawi (PN–PAS)
P019	Tumpat	149,371	Mumtaz Md. Nawi (PN–PAS)	65,426	62.51%	34,793	Che Mohamad Aswari Che Ali (GTA–PUTRA)	593	0.57%	106,131	Che Abdullah Mat Nawi (PN–PAS)
P019	Tumpat	149,371	Mumtaz Md. Nawi (PN–PAS)	65,426	62.51%	34,793	Khairul Azuan Kamarrudin (WARISAN)	245	0.23%	106,131	Che Abdullah Mat Nawi (PN–PAS)
P020	Pengkalan Chepa	106,982	Ahmad Marzuk Shaary (PN–PAS)	53,933	69.36%	38,270	Mohd Hafiezulniezam Mohd Hasdin (BN–UMNO)	15,633	20.14%	78,659	Ahmad Marzuk Shaary (PN–PAS)
P020	Pengkalan Chepa	106,982	Ahmad Marzuk Shaary (PN–PAS)	53,933	69.36%	38,270	Nik Faizah Nik Osman (PH–AMANAH)	7,356	9.46%	78,659	Ahmad Marzuk Shaary (PN–PAS)
P020	Pengkalan Chepa	106,982	Ahmad Marzuk Shaary (PN–PAS)	53,933	69.36%	38,270	Mohamad Redzuan Razali (IND)	451	0.58%	78,659	Ahmad Marzuk Shaary (PN–PAS)
P020	Pengkalan Chepa	106,982	Ahmad Marzuk Shaary (PN–PAS)	53,933	69.36%	38,270	Wan Ahmad Nasri Wan Ismail (GTA–PEJUANG)	358	0.46%	78,659	Ahmad Marzuk Shaary (PN–PAS)
P021	Kota Bharu	115,450	Takiyuddin Hassan (PN–PAS)	41,869	53.67%	22,613	Hafidzah Mustakim (PH–AMANAH)	19,256	24.68%	78,019	Takiyuddin Hassan (PN–PAS)
P021	Kota Bharu	115,450	Takiyuddin Hassan (PN–PAS)	41,869	53.67%	22,613	Rosmadi Ismail (BN–UMNO)	16,168	20.72%	78,019	Takiyuddin Hassan (PN–PAS)
P021	Kota Bharu	115,450	Takiyuddin Hassan (PN–PAS)	41,869	53.67%	22,613	Che Musa Che Omar (GTA–PUTRA)	528	0.68%	78,019	Takiyuddin Hassan (PN–PAS)
P021	Kota Bharu	115,450	Takiyuddin Hassan (PN–PAS)	41,869	53.67%	22,613	Andy Tan Boon Kian (PRM)	107	0.14%	78,019	Takiyuddin Hassan (PN–PAS)
P021	Kota Bharu	115,450	Takiyuddin Hassan (PN–PAS)	41,869	53.67%	22,613	Izat Bukhary Ismail Bukhary (IND)	91	0.12%	78,019	Takiyuddin Hassan (PN–PAS)
P022	Pasir Mas	94,544	Ahmad Fadhli Shaari (PN–PAS)	44,444	68.21%	30,717	Abdul Ghani Harun (BN–UMNO)	13,727	21.07%	65,153	Ahmad Fadhli Shaari (PN–PAS)
P022	Pasir Mas	94,544	Ahmad Fadhli Shaari (PN–PAS)	44,444	68.21%	30,717	Husam Musa (PH–PKR)	6,439	9.88%	65,153	Ahmad Fadhli Shaari (PN–PAS)
P022	Pasir Mas	94,544	Ahmad Fadhli Shaari (PN–PAS)	44,444	68.21%	30,717	Nasrul Ali Hassan Abdul Latif (GTA–PUTRA)	543	0.83%	65,153	Ahmad Fadhli Shaari (PN–PAS)
P023	Rantau Panjang	93,248	Siti Zailah Mohd Yusoff (PN–PAS)	37,759	62.38%	20,636	Zulkarnain Yusoff (BN–UMNO)	17,123	28.29%	60,527	Siti Zailah Mohd Yusoff (PN–PAS)
P023	Rantau Panjang	93,248	Siti Zailah Mohd Yusoff (PN–PAS)	37,759	62.38%	20,636	Wan Shah Jihan Wan Din (PH–AMANAH)	4,256	7.03%	60,527	Siti Zailah Mohd Yusoff (PN–PAS)
P023	Rantau Panjang	93,248	Siti Zailah Mohd Yusoff (PN–PAS)	37,759	62.38%	20,636	Ibrahim Ali (GTA–PUTRA)	1,216	2.01%	60,527	Siti Zailah Mohd Yusoff (PN–PAS)
P023	Rantau Panjang	93,248	Siti Zailah Mohd Yusoff (PN–PAS)	37,759	62.38%	20,636	Mohd Zain Ismail (PRM)	173	0.29%	60,527	Siti Zailah Mohd Yusoff (PN–PAS)
P024	Kubang Kerian	113,640	Tuan Ibrahim Tuan Man (PN–PAS)	55,654	68.38%	40,847	Nurul Amal Mohd Fauzi (BN–UMNO)	14,807	18.19%	81,384	Tuan Ibrahim Tuan Man (PN–PAS)
P024	Kubang Kerian	113,640	Tuan Ibrahim Tuan Man (PN–PAS)	55,654	68.38%	40,847	Wan Ahmad Kamil Wan Abdullah (PH–AMANAH)	10,236	12.58%	81,384	Tuan Ibrahim Tuan Man (PN–PAS)
P024	Kubang Kerian	113,640	Tuan Ibrahim Tuan Man (PN–PAS)	55,654	68.38%	40,847	Mohamad Rizal Razali (GTA–PEJUANG)	687	0.84%	81,384	Tuan Ibrahim Tuan Man (PN–PAS)
P025	Bachok	123,183	Mohd Syahir Che Sulaiman (PN–PAS)	57,496	63.89%	29,901	Mohd Zain Yasim (BN–UMNO)	27,229	30.45%	89,417	Nik Mohamed Abduh Nik Abdul Aziz (PN–PAS)
P025	Bachok	123,183	Mohd Syahir Che Sulaiman (PN–PAS)	57,496	63.89%	29,901	Nur Azmiza Mamat (PH–PKR)	4,366	4.88%	89,417	Nik Mohamed Abduh Nik Abdul Aziz (PN–PAS)
P025	Bachok	123,183	Mohd Syahir Che Sulaiman (PN–PAS)	57,496	63.89%	29,901	Mohd Zulkifli Zakaria (IND)	418	0.47%	89,417	Nik Mohamed Abduh Nik Abdul Aziz (PN–PAS)
P025	Bachok	123,183	Mohd Syahir Che Sulaiman (PN–PAS)	57,496	63.89%	29,901	Kamarul Azam Abdel Osman (GTA–PUTRA)	274	0.31%	89,417	Nik Mohamed Abduh Nik Abdul Aziz (PN–PAS)
P026	Ketereh	85,281	Khilir Mohd Nor (PN–BERSATU)	40,542	64.49%	23,107	Marzuani Ardila Ariffin (BN–UMNO)	17,435	27.74%	62,862	Annuar Musa (BN–UMNO)
P026	Ketereh	85,281	Khilir Mohd Nor (PN–BERSATU)	40,542	64.49%	23,107	Rahimi L Muhamud (PH–PKR)	4,662	7.42%	62,862	Annuar Musa (BN–UMNO)
P026	Ketereh	85,281	Khilir Mohd Nor (PN–BERSATU)	40,542	64.49%	23,107	Haneef Ibrahim (GTA–PUTRA)	223	0.35%	62,862	Annuar Musa (BN–UMNO)
P027	Tanah Merah	98,782	Ikmal Hisham Abdul Aziz (PN–BERSATU)	54,266	77.87%	44,498	Bakri @ Mohd Bakri Mustapha (BN–UMNO)	9,781	14.04%	69,686	Ikmal Hisham Abdul Aziz (PN–BERSATU)
P027	Tanah Merah	98,782	Ikmal Hisham Abdul Aziz (PN–BERSATU)	54,266	77.87%	44,498	Mohamad Supardi Md Noor (PH–PKR)	5,357	7.69%	69,686	Ikmal Hisham Abdul Aziz (PN–BERSATU)
P027	Tanah Merah	98,782	Ikmal Hisham Abdul Aziz (PN–BERSATU)	54,266	77.87%	44,498	Nasir Abdullah (GTA–PUTRA)	168	0.24%	69,686	Ikmal Hisham Abdul Aziz (PN–BERSATU)
P027	Tanah Merah	98,782	Ikmal Hisham Abdul Aziz (PN–BERSATU)	54,266	77.87%	44,498	Nik Sapeia Nik Yusoff (IND)	114	0.16%	69,686	Ikmal Hisham Abdul Aziz (PN–BERSATU)
P028	Pasir Puteh	113,070	Nik Muhammad Zawawi Salleh (PN–PAS)	52,937	65.37%	29,109	Zawawi Othman (BN–UMNO)	23,828	29.43%	80,978	Nik Muhammad Zawawi Salleh (PN–PAS)
P028	Pasir Puteh	113,070	Nik Muhammad Zawawi Salleh (PN–PAS)	52,937	65.37%	29,109	Muhammad Husin (PH–AMANAH)	3,864	4.77%	80,978	Nik Muhammad Zawawi Salleh (PN–PAS)
P028	Pasir Puteh	113,070	Nik Muhammad Zawawi Salleh (PN–PAS)	52,937	65.37%	29,109	Wan Marzudi Wan Umar (GTA–PEJUANG)	349	0.43%	80,978	Nik Muhammad Zawawi Salleh (PN–PAS)
P029	Machang	88,825	Wan Ahmad Fayhsal Wan Ahmad Kamal (PN–BERSATU)	35,603	54.68%	10,154	Ahmad Jazlan Yaakub (BN–UMNO)	25,449	39.08%	65,114	Ahmad Jazlan Yaakub (BN–UMNO)
P029	Machang	88,825	Wan Ahmad Fayhsal Wan Ahmad Kamal (PN–BERSATU)	35,603	54.68%	10,154	Rosli Allani Abdul Kadir (PH–PKR)	3,934	6.04%	65,114	Ahmad Jazlan Yaakub (BN–UMNO)
P029	Machang	88,825	Wan Ahmad Fayhsal Wan Ahmad Kamal (PN–BERSATU)	35,603	54.68%	10,154	Mohammad Seman (GTA–PUTRA)	128	0.20%	65,114	Ahmad Jazlan Yaakub (BN–UMNO)
P030	Jeli	59,798	Zahari Kechik (PN–BERSATU)	27,072	63.03%	12,464	Norwahida Patuan (BN–UMNO)	14,608	34.01%	42,953	Mustapa Mohamed (PN–BERSATU)}
P030	Jeli	59,798	Zahari Kechik (PN–BERSATU)	27,072	63.03%	12,464	Md Radzi Wahab (PH–AMANAH)	1,140	2.65%	42,953	Mustapa Mohamed (PN–BERSATU)}
P030	Jeli	59,798	Zahari Kechik (PN–BERSATU)	27,072	63.03%	12,464	Mohammad Daud (GTA–PUTRA)	133	0.31%	42,953	Mustapa Mohamed (PN–BERSATU)}
P031	Kuala Krai	92,335	Ab Latiff Ab Rahman (PN–PAS)	42,740	66.08%	25,188	Mohd Zulkepli Omar (BN–UMNO)	17,552	27.14%	64,681	Ab Latiff Ab Rahman (PN–PAS)}
P031	Kuala Krai	92,335	Ab Latiff Ab Rahman (PN–PAS)	42,740	66.08%	25,188	Mohamad Hishamuddin Ghazali (PH–AMANAH)	4,148	6.41%	64,681	Ab Latiff Ab Rahman (PN–PAS)}
P031	Kuala Krai	92,335	Ab Latiff Ab Rahman (PN–PAS)	42,740	66.08%	25,188	Norashikin Che Umar (GTA–PEJUANG)	241	0.37%	64,681	Ab Latiff Ab Rahman (PN–PAS)}
P032	Gua Musang	70,254	Mohd Azizi Abu Naim (PN–BERSATU)	21,826	45.12%	163	Tengku Razaleigh Hamzah (BN–UMNO)	21,663	44.78%	48,377	Tengku Razaleigh Hamzah (BN–UMNO)
P032	Gua Musang	70,254	Mohd Azizi Abu Naim (PN–BERSATU)	21,826	45.12%	163	Asharun Uji (PH–PKR)	4,517	9.34%	48,377	Tengku Razaleigh Hamzah (BN–UMNO)
P032	Gua Musang	70,254	Mohd Azizi Abu Naim (PN–BERSATU)	21,826	45.12%	163	Samsu Adabi Mamat (GTA–PEJUANG)	371	0.77%	48,377	Tengku Razaleigh Hamzah (BN–UMNO)

== Terengganu ==
#	Constituency	Registered Electors	Winner	Votes	Votes %	Majority	Opponent(s)	Votes	Votes %	Total valid votes	Incumbent
PN 8 | BN 0 | PH 0 | GTA 0
P033	Besut	111,650	Che Mohamad Zulkifly Jusoh (PN–PAS)	49,569	58.07%	18,666	Nawi Mohamad (BN–UMNO)	30,903	36.20%	85,364	Idris Jusoh (BN–UMNO)
P033	Besut	111,650	Che Mohamad Zulkifly Jusoh (PN–PAS)	49,569	58.07%	18,666	Abd Rahman @ Abd Aziz Abas (PH–AMANAH)	4,339	5.08%	85,364	Idris Jusoh (BN–UMNO)
P033	Besut	111,650	Che Mohamad Zulkifly Jusoh (PN–PAS)	49,569	58.07%	18,666	Wan Nazari Wan Jusoh (GTA–PEJUANG)	553	0.65%	85,364	Idris Jusoh (BN–UMNO)
P034	Setiu	107,294	Shaharizukirnain Abd. Kadir (PN–PAS)	50,768	59.85%	19,032	Abdul Rahman Yassin (BN–UMNO)	31,736	37.41%	84,832	Shahrizukirnain Abd. Kadir (PN–PAS)
P034	Setiu	107,294	Shaharizukirnain Abd. Kadir (PN–PAS)	50,768	59.85%	19,032	Mohamad Ngah (PH–PKR)	2,125	2.50%	84,832	Shahrizukirnain Abd. Kadir (PN–PAS)
P034	Setiu	107,294	Shaharizukirnain Abd. Kadir (PN–PAS)	50,768	59.85%	19,032	Wan Adnan Wan Ali (GTA–PEJUANG)	203	0.24%	84,832	Shahrizukirnain Abd. Kadir (PN–PAS)
P035	Kuala Nerus	105,952	Alias Razak (PN–PAS)	56,697	64.70%	29,765	Mohd Khairuddin Aman Razali (BN–UMNO)	26,932	30.73%	87,628	Mohd Khairuddin Aman Razali (IND)
P035	Kuala Nerus	105,952	Alias Razak (PN–PAS)	56,697	64.70%	29,765	Suhaimi Hashim (PH–AMANAH)	3,708	4.23%	87,628	Mohd Khairuddin Aman Razali (IND)
P035	Kuala Nerus	105,952	Alias Razak (PN–PAS)	56,697	64.70%	29,765	Azahar Wahid (GTA–PUTRA)	291	0.33%	87,628	Mohd Khairuddin Aman Razali (IND)
P036	Kuala Terengganu	123,305	Ahmad Amzad Mohamed @ Hashim (PN–PAS)	63,016	65.27%	40,907	Mohd Zubir Embong (BN–UMNO)	22,109	22.90%	96,552	Ahmad Amzad Mohamed @ Hashim (PN–PAS)
P036	Kuala Terengganu	123,305	Ahmad Amzad Mohamed @ Hashim (PN–PAS)	63,016	65.27%	40,907	Raja Kamarul Bahrin Shah Raja Ahmad (PH–AMANAH)	10,946	11.34%	96,552	Ahmad Amzad Mohamed @ Hashim (PN–PAS)
P036	Kuala Terengganu	123,305	Ahmad Amzad Mohamed @ Hashim (PN–PAS)	63,016	65.27%	40,907	Mohamad Abu Bakar Muda (GTA–PUTRA)	481	0.50%	96,552	Ahmad Amzad Mohamed @ Hashim (PN–PAS)
P037	Marang	131,756	Abdul Hadi Awang (PN–PAS)	73,115	67.04%	41,729	Jasmira Othman (BN–UMNO)	31,386	28.78%	109,068	Abdul Hadi Awang (PN–PAS)
P037	Marang	131,756	Abdul Hadi Awang (PN–PAS)	73,115	67.04%	41,729	Azhar Abdul Shukur (PH–AMANAH)	4,140	3.80%	109,068	Abdul Hadi Awang (PN–PAS)
P037	Marang	131,756	Abdul Hadi Awang (PN–PAS)	73,115	67.04%	41,729	Zarawi Sulung (GTA–PUTRA)	427	0.39%	109,068	Abdul Hadi Awang (PN–PAS)
P038	Hulu Terengganu	87,917	Rosol Wahid (PN–BERSATU)	42,910	59.59%	15,734	Rozi Mamat (BN–UMNO)	27,176	37.74%	72,008	Rosol Wahid (PN–BERSATU)
P038	Hulu Terengganu	87,917	Rosol Wahid (PN–BERSATU)	42,910	59.59%	15,734	Alias Ismail (PH–PKR)	1,740	2.42%	72,008	Rosol Wahid (PN–BERSATU)
P038	Hulu Terengganu	87,917	Rosol Wahid (PN–BERSATU)	42,910	59.59%	15,734	Mohd Khadri Abdullah (GTA–PUTRA)	182	0.25%	72,008	Rosol Wahid (PN–BERSATU)
P039	Dungun	115,559	Wan Hassan Mohd Ramli (PN–PAS)	59,720	65.43%	34,105	Norhisham Johari (BN–UMNO)	25,615	28.07%	91,269	Wan Hassan Mohd Ramli (PN–PAS)
P039	Dungun	115,559	Wan Hassan Mohd Ramli (PN–PAS)	59,720	65.43%	34,105	Mohasdjone @ Mohd Johari Mohamad (PH–PKR)	5,307	5.81%	91,269	Wan Hassan Mohd Ramli (PN–PAS)
P039	Dungun	115,559	Wan Hassan Mohd Ramli (PN–PAS)	59,720	65.43%	34,105	Nur Aishah Hassan (GTA–PEJUANG)	322	0.35%	91,269	Wan Hassan Mohd Ramli (PN–PAS)
P039	Dungun	115,559	Wan Hassan Mohd Ramli (PN–PAS)	59,720	65.43%	34,105	Ghazali Ismail (IND)	305	0.33%	91,269	Wan Hassan Mohd Ramli (PN–PAS)
P040	Kemaman	139,423	Che Alias Hamid (PN–PAS)	65,714	58.11%	27,179	Ahmad Said (BN–UMNO)	38,535	34.07%	113,095	Che Alias Hamid (PN–PAS)
P040	Kemaman	139,423	Che Alias Hamid (PN–PAS)	65,714	58.11%	27,179	Hasuni Sudin (PH–PKR)	8,340	7.37%	113,095	Che Alias Hamid (PN–PAS)
P040	Kemaman	139,423	Che Alias Hamid (PN–PAS)	65,714	58.11%	27,179	Rosli Abd Ghani (GTA–PEJUANG)	506	0.45%	113,095	Che Alias Hamid (PN–PAS)

== Pulau Pinang ==
#	Constituency	Registered Electors	Winner	Votes	Votes %	Majority	Opponent(s)	Votes	Votes %	Total valid votes	Incumbent
PH 10 | PN 3 | BN 0 | GTA 0 | WARISAN 0 | PRM 0 | Independent 0
P041	Kepala Batas	83,081	Siti Mastura Mohamad (PN–PAS)	28,604	41.27%	2,867	Reezal Merican Naina Merican (BN–UMNO)	25,737	37.14%	69,302	Reezal Merican Naina Merican (BN–UMNO)
P041	Kepala Batas	83,081	Siti Mastura Mohamad (PN–PAS)	28,604	41.27%	2,867	Muhammad Danial Abdul Majeed (MUDA)	14,214	20.51%	69,302	Reezal Merican Naina Merican (BN–UMNO)
P041	Kepala Batas	83,081	Siti Mastura Mohamad (PN–PAS)	28,604	41.27%	2,867	Hamidi Abu Hassan (GTA–BERJASA)	747	1.08%	69,302	Reezal Merican Naina Merican (BN–UMNO)
P042	Tasek Gelugor	80,868	Wan Saifulruddin Wan Jan (PN–BERSATU)	31,116	46.36%	12,252	Muhamad Yusoff Mohd Noor (BN–UMNO)	18,864	28.11%	67,112	Shabudin Yahaya (PN–BERSATU)
P042	Tasek Gelugor	80,868	Wan Saifulruddin Wan Jan (PN–BERSATU)	31,116	46.36%	12,252	Razak Ridzuan (PH–AMANAH)	16,547	24.66%	67,112	Shabudin Yahaya (PN–BERSATU)
P042	Tasek Gelugor	80,868	Wan Saifulruddin Wan Jan (PN–BERSATU)	31,116	46.36%	12,252	Abdul Halim Sirjung (GTA–GB)	406	0.60%	67,112	Shabudin Yahaya (PN–BERSATU)
P042	Tasek Gelugor	80,868	Wan Saifulruddin Wan Jan (PN–BERSATU)	31,116	46.36%	12,252	Mohd Akmal Azhar (WARISAN)	179	0.27%	67,112	Shabudin Yahaya (PN–BERSATU)
P043	Bagan	89,447	Lim Guan Eng (PH–DAP)	55,797	81.27%	49,648	Alan Oh @ Oh Teik Choon (PN–BERSATU)	6,149	8.96%	68,654	Lim Guan Eng (PH–DAP)
P043	Bagan	89,447	Lim Guan Eng (PH–DAP)	55,797	81.27%	49,648	Tan Chuan Hong (BN–MCA)	5,385	7.84%	68,654	Lim Guan Eng (PH–DAP)
P043	Bagan	89,447	Lim Guan Eng (PH–DAP)	55,797	81.27%	49,648	Mohd Hafiz Mohd Abu (GTA–IMAN)	1,323	1.93%	68,654	Lim Guan Eng (PH–DAP)
P044	Permatang Pauh	107,186	Muhammad Fawwaz Mat Jan (PN–PAS)	37,638	43.04%	5,272	Nurul Izzah Anwar (PH–PKR)	32,366	37.01%	87,448	Nurul Izzah Anwar (PH–PKR)
P044	Permatang Pauh	107,186	Muhammad Fawwaz Mat Jan (PN–PAS)	37,638	43.04%	5,272	Mohd Zaidi Mohd Zaid (BN–UMNO)	16,971	19.41%	87,448	Nurul Izzah Anwar (PH–PKR)
P044	Permatang Pauh	107,186	Muhammad Fawwaz Mat Jan (PN–PAS)	37,638	43.04%	5,272	Mohamad Nasir Osman (GTA–PUTRA)	473	0.54%	87,448	Nurul Izzah Anwar (PH–PKR)
P045	Bukit Mertajam	120,819	Steven Sim Chee Keong (PH–DAP)	71,722	77.33%	57,685	Steven Koh Tien Yew (PN–PAS)	14,037	15.14%	92,745	Steven Sim Chee Keong (PH–DAP)
P045	Bukit Mertajam	120,819	Steven Sim Chee Keong (PH–DAP)	71,722	77.33%	57,685	Tan Yang Pang (BN–MCA)	6,986	7.53%	92,745	Steven Sim Chee Keong (PH–DAP)
P046	Batu Kawan	88,812	Chow Kon Yeow (PH–DAP)	50,744	73.72%	40,400	Wong Chia Zen (PN–GERAKAN)	10,344	15.03%	68,831	Kasthuriraani Patto (PH–DAP)
P046	Batu Kawan	88,812	Chow Kon Yeow (PH–DAP)	50,744	73.72%	40,400	Tan Lee Huat (BN–MCA)	7,145	10.38%	68,831	Kasthuriraani Patto (PH–DAP)
P046	Batu Kawan	88,812	Chow Kon Yeow (PH–DAP)	50,744	73.72%	40,400	Ong Chin Wen (WARISAN)	450	0.65%	68,831	Kasthuriraani Patto (PH–DAP)
P046	Batu Kawan	88,812	Chow Kon Yeow (PH–DAP)	50,744	73.72%	40,400	Lee Ah Liang (PRM)	148	0.22%	68,831	Kasthuriraani Patto (PH–DAP)
P047	Nibong Tebal	100,062	Fadhlina Sidek (PH–PKR)	42,188	53.40%	16,293	Mansor Othman (PN–BERSATU)	25,895	32.65%	79,308	Mansor Othman (PN–BERSATU)
P047	Nibong Tebal	100,062	Fadhlina Sidek (PH–PKR)	42,188	53.40%	16,293	Thanenthiran Ramankutty (BN–MMSP)	10,660	13.44%	79,308	Mansor Othman (PN–BERSATU)
P047	Nibong Tebal	100,062	Fadhlina Sidek (PH–PKR)	42,188	53.40%	16,293	Goh Kheng Huat (IND)	565	0.71%	79,308	Mansor Othman (PN–BERSATU)
P048	Bukit Bendera	92,521	Syerleena Abdul Rashid (PH–DAP)	49,353	78.98%	42,610	Hng Chee Wey (PN–GERAKAN)	6,743	10.79%	62,489	Wong Hon Wai (PH–DAP)
P048	Bukit Bendera	92,521	Syerleena Abdul Rashid (PH–DAP)	49,353	78.98%	42,610	Richie Huan Xin Yun (BN–PCM)	5,417	8.67%	62,489	Wong Hon Wai (PH–DAP)
P048	Bukit Bendera	92,521	Syerleena Abdul Rashid (PH–DAP)	49,353	78.98%	42,610	Teh Yee Cheu (PRM)	677	1.08%	62,489	Wong Hon Wai (PH–DAP)
P048	Bukit Bendera	92,521	Syerleena Abdul Rashid (PH–DAP)	49,353	78.98%	42,610	Razalif Mohd Zain (IND)	299	0.48%	62,489	Wong Hon Wai (PH–DAP)
P049	Tanjong	52,803	Lim Hui Ying (PH–DAP)	31,968	84.83%	28,754	Tan Kim Nee (BN–MCA)	3,214	8.53%	37,683	Chow Kon Yeow (PH–DAP)
P049	Tanjong	52,803	Lim Hui Ying (PH–DAP)	31,968	84.83%	28,754	Hng Khoon Leng (PN–GERAKAN)	2,501	6.64%	37,683	Chow Kon Yeow (PH–DAP)
P050	Jelutong	93,989	RSN Rayer (PH–DAP)	50,369	71.24%	38,604	Baljit Singh Jigiri Singh (PN–GERAKAN)	11,765	16.64%	70,707	RSN Rayer (PH–DAP)
P050	Jelutong	93,989	RSN Rayer (PH–DAP)	50,369	71.24%	38,604	Loganathan Thoraisamy (BN–IPF)	7,387	10.45%	70,707	RSN Rayer (PH–DAP)
P050	Jelutong	93,989	RSN Rayer (PH–DAP)	50,369	71.24%	38,604	Mohamed Yaacob Mohamed Noor (IND)	480	0.68%	70,707	RSN Rayer (PH–DAP)
P050	Jelutong	93,989	RSN Rayer (PH–DAP)	50,369	71.24%	38,604	Lim Huat Poh (WARISAN)	442	0.63%	70,707	RSN Rayer (PH–DAP)
P050	Jelutong	93,989	RSN Rayer (PH–DAP)	50,369	71.24%	38,604	Koh Swe Yong (PRM)	264	0.37%	70,707	RSN Rayer (PH–DAP)
P051	Bukit Gelugor	117,134	Ramkarpal Singh (PH–DAP)	71,204	82.73%	63,112	Thinaganarabhan Padmanabhan (PN–BERSATU)	8,092	9.40%	86,073	Ramkarpal Singh (PH–DAP)
P051	Bukit Gelugor	117,134	Ramkarpal Singh (PH–DAP)	71,204	82.73%	63,112	Wong Chin Chong (BN–MCA)	6,777	7.87%	86,073	Ramkarpal Singh (PH–DAP)
P052	Bayan Baru	119,640	Sim Tze Tzin (PH–PKR)	55,209	61.54%	34,902	Oh Tong Keong (PN–GERAKAN)	20,307	22.64%	89,708	Sim Tze Tzin (PH–PKR)
P052	Bayan Baru	119,640	Sim Tze Tzin (PH–PKR)	55,209	61.54%	34,902	Saw Yee Fung (BN–MCA)	13,377	14.91%	89,708	Sim Tze Tzin (PH–PKR)
P052	Bayan Baru	119,640	Sim Tze Tzin (PH–PKR)	55,209	61.54%	34,902	Jeff Ooi Chuan Aun (WARISAN)	440	0.49%	89,708	Sim Tze Tzin (PH–PKR)
P052	Bayan Baru	119,640	Sim Tze Tzin (PH–PKR)	55,209	61.54%	34,902	Ravinder Singh (PRM)	251	0.28%	89,708	Sim Tze Tzin (PH–PKR)
P052	Bayan Baru	119,640	Sim Tze Tzin (PH–PKR)	55,209	61.54%	34,902	Stevie Chan Keng Leong (IND)	124	0.14%	89,708	Sim Tze Tzin (PH–PKR)
P053	Balik Pulau	80,264	Muhammad Bakhtiar Wan Chik (PH–PKR)	24,564	38.43%	1,582	Muhammad Harris Idaham Abdul Rashid (PN–BERSATU)	22,982	35.96%	63,911	Muhammad Bakhtiar Wan Chik (PH–PKR)
P053	Balik Pulau	80,264	Muhammad Bakhtiar Wan Chik (PH–PKR)	24,564	38.43%	1,582	Shah Headan Ayoob Hussain Shah (BN–UMNO)	15,478	24.22%	63,911	Muhammad Bakhtiar Wan Chik (PH–PKR)
P053	Balik Pulau	80,264	Muhammad Bakhtiar Wan Chik (PH–PKR)	24,564	38.43%	1,582	Sabaruddin Ahmad (IND)	366	0.57%	63,911	Muhammad Bakhtiar Wan Chik (PH–PKR)
P053	Balik Pulau	80,264	Muhammad Bakhtiar Wan Chik (PH–PKR)	24,564	38.43%	1,582	Fazli Mohammad (GTA–PEJUANG)	341	0.53%	63,911	Muhammad Bakhtiar Wan Chik (PH–PKR)
P053	Balik Pulau	80,264	Muhammad Bakhtiar Wan Chik (PH–PKR)	24,564	38.43%	1,582	Johnny Ch'ng Ewe Gee (IND)	180	0.28%	63,911	Muhammad Bakhtiar Wan Chik (PH–PKR)

== Perak ==
#	Constituency	Registered Electors	Winner	Votes	Votes %	Majority	Opponent(s)	Votes	Votes %	Total valid votes	Incumbent
PH 11 | PN 10 | BN 3 | GTA 0 | WARISAN 0 | Independent 0
P054	Gerik	47,565	Fathul Huzir Ayob (PN–BERSATU)	15,105	43.64%	1,377	Asyraf Wajdi Dusuki (BN–UMNO)	13,728	39.66%	34,612	VAC
P054	Gerik	47,565	Fathul Huzir Ayob (PN–BERSATU)	15,105	43.64%	1,377	Ahmad Tarmizi Mohd Jam (PH–DAP)	5,779	16.70%	34,612	VAC
P055	Lenggong	36,950	Shamsul Anuar Nasarah (BN–UMNO)	12,588	45.48%	879	Muhammad Rifaat Razman (PN–PAS)	11,709	42.30%	27,679	Shamsul Anuar Nasarah (BN–UMNO)
P055	Lenggong	36,950	Shamsul Anuar Nasarah (BN–UMNO)	12,588	45.48%	879	Jurey Latiff Mohd Rosli (PH–PKR)	3,382	12.22%	27,679	Shamsul Anuar Nasarah (BN–UMNO)
P056	Larut	65,719	Hamzah Zainudin (PN–BERSATU)	28,350	54.65%	11,598	Mohd Shafiq Fhadly Mahmud (BN–UMNO)	16,752	32.29%	51,875	Hamzah Zainudin (PN–BERSATU)
P056	Larut	65,719	Hamzah Zainudin (PN–BERSATU)	28,350	54.65%	11,598	Zolkarnain Abidin (PH–AMANAH)	6,207	11.95%	51,875	Hamzah Zainudin (PN–BERSATU)
P056	Larut	65,719	Hamzah Zainudin (PN–BERSATU)	28,350	54.65%	11,598	Auzaie Fadzlan Shahidi (GTA–BERJASA)	566	1.09%	51,875	Hamzah Zainudin (PN–BERSATU)
P057	Parit Buntar	68,502	Mohd Misbahul Munir Masduki (PN–PAS)	23,223	43.90%	5,395	Mujahid Yusof Rawa (PH–AMANAH)	17,828	33.70%	52,903	Mujahid Yusof Rawa (PH–AMANAH)
P057	Parit Buntar	68,502	Mohd Misbahul Munir Masduki (PN–PAS)	23,223	43.90%	5,395	Imran Mohd Yusof (BN–UMNO)	11,593	21.91%	52,903	Mujahid Yusof Rawa (PH–AMANAH)
P057	Parit Buntar	68,502	Mohd Misbahul Munir Masduki (PN–PAS)	23,223	43.90%	5,395	Rohijas Md Sharif (GTA–PEJUANG)	259	0.49%	52,903	Mujahid Yusof Rawa (PH–AMANAH)
P058	Bagan Serai	80,293	Idris Ahmad (PN–PAS)	33,753	53.98%	18,551	Zul Helmi Ghazali (BN–UMNO)	15,202	24.31%	62,533	Noor Azmi Ghazali (PN–BERSATU)
P058	Bagan Serai	80,293	Idris Ahmad (PN–PAS)	33,753	53.98%	18,551	Siti Aishah Shaik Ismail (PH–PKR)	13,195	21.10%	62,533	Noor Azmi Ghazali (PN–BERSATU)
P058	Bagan Serai	80,293	Idris Ahmad (PN–PAS)	33,753	53.98%	18,551	Ahmad Luqman Ahmad Yahaya (GTA–PEJUANG)	383	0.61%	62,533	Noor Azmi Ghazali (PN–BERSATU)
P059	Bukit Gantang	94,253	Syed Abu Hussin Hafiz Syed Abdul Fasal (PN–BERSATU)	32,625	45.59%	12,756	Mohammad Sollehin Mohamad Tajie (BN–UMNO)	19,869	27.76%	71,567	Syed Abu Hussin Hafiz Syed Abdul Fasal (PN–BERSATU)
P059	Bukit Gantang	94,253	Syed Abu Hussin Hafiz Syed Abdul Fasal (PN–BERSATU)	32,625	45.59%	12,756	Fakhruldin Mohd Hashim (PH–AMANAH)	18,565	25.94%	71,567	Syed Abu Hussin Hafiz Syed Abdul Fasal (PN–BERSATU)
P059	Bukit Gantang	94,253	Syed Abu Hussin Hafiz Syed Abdul Fasal (PN–BERSATU)	32,625	45.59%	12,756	Mohd Shukri Mohd Yusoff (GTA–PEJUANG)	508	0.71%	71,567	Syed Abu Hussin Hafiz Syed Abdul Fasal (PN–BERSATU)
P060	Taiping	121,566	Wong Kah Woh (PH–DAP)	47,098	55.56%	25,529	See Tean Seng (PN–GERAKAN)	21,569	25.44%	84,769	Teh Kok Lim (PH–DAP)
P060	Taiping	121,566	Wong Kah Woh (PH–DAP)	47,098	55.56%	25,529	Neow Choo Seong (BN–MCA)	14,599	17.22%	84,769	Teh Kok Lim (PH–DAP)
P060	Taiping	121,566	Wong Kah Woh (PH–DAP)	47,098	55.56%	25,529	Leow Thye Yih (IND)	1,154	1.36%	84,769	Teh Kok Lim (PH–DAP)
P060	Taiping	121,566	Wong Kah Woh (PH–DAP)	47,098	55.56%	25,529	Mohganan P Manikam (IND)	236	0.28%	84,769	Teh Kok Lim (PH–DAP)
P060	Taiping	121,566	Wong Kah Woh (PH–DAP)	47,098	55.56%	25,529	A. Rama Moorthy @ Steven Ram (IND)	113	0.13%	84,769	Teh Kok Lim (PH–DAP)
P061	Padang Rengas	38,686	Azahari Hasan (PN–BERSATU)	12,931	43.28%	3,046	Mohd Arrif Abdul Majid (BN–UMNO)	9,885	33.08%	29,878	Mohamed Nazri Abdul Aziz (BN–UMNO)
P061	Padang Rengas	38,686	Azahari Hasan (PN–BERSATU)	12,931	43.28%	3,046	Muhammad Kamil Abdul Munim (PH–PKR)	7,062	23.64%	29,878	Mohamed Nazri Abdul Aziz (BN–UMNO)
P062	Sungai Siput	72,395	Kesavan Subramaniam (PH–PKR)	21,637	41.89%	1,846	Vigneswaran Sanasee (BN–MIC)	19,791	38.32%	51,649	Kesavan Subramaniam (PH–PKR)
P062	Sungai Siput	72,395	Kesavan Subramaniam (PH–PKR)	21,637	41.89%	1,846	Irudhanathan Gabriel (PN–BERSATU)	8,190	15.86%	51,649	Kesavan Subramaniam (PH–PKR)
P062	Sungai Siput	72,395	Kesavan Subramaniam (PH–PKR)	21,637	41.89%	1,846	Ahmad Fauzi Mohd Jaafar (GTA–PEJUANG)	784	1.32%	51,649	Kesavan Subramaniam (PH–PKR)
P062	Sungai Siput	72,395	Kesavan Subramaniam (PH–PKR)	21,637	41.89%	1,846	R Indriani (IND)	614	1.19%	51,649	Kesavan Subramaniam (PH–PKR)
P062	Sungai Siput	72,395	Kesavan Subramaniam (PH–PKR)	21,637	41.89%	1,846	Baharudin Kamarudin (IND)	598	1.16%	51,649	Kesavan Subramaniam (PH–PKR)
P062	Sungai Siput	72,395	Kesavan Subramaniam (PH–PKR)	21,637	41.89%	1,846	Rajah Narasam (IND)	35	0.07%	51,649	Kesavan Subramaniam (PH–PKR)
P063	Tambun	160,558	Anwar Ibrahim (PH–PKR)	49,625	39.77%	3,736	Ahmad Faizal Azumu (PN–BERSATU)	45,889	36.78%	124,769	Ahmad Faizal Azumu (PN–BERSATU)
P063	Tambun	160,558	Anwar Ibrahim (PH–PKR)	49,625	39.77%	3,736	Aminuddin Md Hanafiah (BN–UMNO)	28,140	22.55%	124,769	Ahmad Faizal Azumu (PN–BERSATU)
P063	Tambun	160,558	Anwar Ibrahim (PH–PKR)	49,625	39.77%	3,736	Abdul Rahim Tahir (GTA–PEJUANG)	1,115	0.89%	124,769	Ahmad Faizal Azumu (PN–BERSATU)
P064	Ipoh Timor	118,178	Howard Lee Chuan How (PH–DAP)	57,549	72.13%	43,888	Nor Afzainizam Salleh (PN–BERSATU)	13,661	17.12%	79,780	Wong Kah Woh (PH–DAP)
P064	Ipoh Timor	118,178	Howard Lee Chuan How (PH–DAP)	57,549	72.13%	43,888	Ng Kai Cheong (BN–MCA)	8,570	10.74%	79,780	Wong Kah Woh (PH–DAP)
P065	Ipoh Barat	114,654	Kulasegaran Murugeson (PH–DAP)	63,915	81.57%	56,667	Low Guo Nan (BN–MCA)	7,248	9.25%	78,356	Kulasegaran Murugeson (PH–DAP)
P065	Ipoh Barat	114,654	Kulasegaran Murugeson (PH–DAP)	63,915	81.57%	56,667	Chek Kwong Weng (PN–GERAKAN)	6,815	8.70%	78,356	Kulasegaran Murugeson (PH–DAP)
P065	Ipoh Barat	114,654	Kulasegaran Murugeson (PH–DAP)	63,915	81.57%	56,667	M. Kayveas (IND)	378	0.48%	78,356	Kulasegaran Murugeson (PH–DAP)
P066	Batu Gajah	111,896	Sivakumar Varatharaju Naidu (PH–DAP)	60,999	81.38%	53,836	Woo Cheong Yuen (PN–GERAKAN)	7,163	9.56%	74,955	Sivakumar Varatharaju Naidu (PH–DAP)
P066	Batu Gajah	111,896	Sivakumar Varatharaju Naidu (PH–DAP)	60,999	81.38%	53,836	Teoh Chin Chong (BN–MCA)	6,793	9.06%	74,955	Sivakumar Varatharaju Naidu (PH–DAP)
P067	Kuala Kangsar	46,985	Iskandar Dzulkarnain Abdul Khalid (PN–BERSATU)	14,380	40.22%	3,566	Maslin Sham Razman (BN–UMNO)	10,814	30.25%	35,754	Mastura Mohd Yazid (BN–UMNO)
P067	Kuala Kangsar	46,985	Iskandar Dzulkarnain Abdul Khalid (PN–BERSATU)	14,380	40.22%	3,566	Ahmad Termizi Ramli (PH–AMANAH)	10,356	28.96%	35,754	Mastura Mohd Yazid (BN–UMNO)
P067	Kuala Kangsar	46,985	Iskandar Dzulkarnain Abdul Khalid (PN–BERSATU)	14,380	40.22%	3,566	Yusmalia Mohamad Yusof (GTA–PEJUANG)	204	0.57%	35,754	Mastura Mohd Yazid (BN–UMNO)
P068	Beruas	108,249	Ngeh Koo Ham (PH–DAP)	46,710	64.72%	33,971	Ong Kean Sing (PN–GERAKAN)	12,739	17.65%	72,173	Ngeh Koo Ham (PH–DAP)
P068	Beruas	108,249	Ngeh Koo Ham (PH–DAP)	46,710	64.72%	33,971	Ding Siew Chee (BN–MCA)	12,724	17.63%	72,173	Ngeh Koo Ham (PH–DAP)
P069	Parit	47,915	Muhamamd Ismi Mat Taib (PN–PAS)	17,181	45.76%	2,155	Mohd Nizar Zakaria (BN–UMNO)	15,026	40.02%	37,545	Mohd Nizar Zakaria (BN–UMNO)
P069	Parit	47,915	Muhamamd Ismi Mat Taib (PN–PAS)	17,181	45.76%	2,155	Nurthaqaffah Nordin (PH–AMANAH)	5,063	13.49%	37,545	Mohd Nizar Zakaria (BN–UMNO)
P069	Parit	47,915	Muhamamd Ismi Mat Taib (PN–PAS)	17,181	45.76%	2,155	Faizol Fadzli Mohamed (GTA–PEJUANG)	275	0.73%	37,545	Mohd Nizar Zakaria (BN–UMNO)
P070	Kampar	89,894	Chong Zhemin (PH–DAP)	30,467	51.30%	14,330	Lee Chee Leong (BN–MCA)	16,137	27.17%	59,386	Thomas Su Keong Siong (PH–DAP)
P070	Kampar	89,894	Chong Zhemin (PH–DAP)	30,467	51.30%	14,330	Janice Wong Oi Foon (PN–GERAKAN)	12,127	20.42%	59,386	Thomas Su Keong Siong (PH–DAP)
P070	Kampar	89,894	Chong Zhemin (PH–DAP)	30,467	51.30%	14,330	Leong Cheok Keng (WARISAN)	655	1.10%	59,386	Thomas Su Keong Siong (PH–DAP)
P071	Gopeng	143,657	Tan Kar Hing (PH–PKR)	55,880	53.92%	27,148	Muhammad Farhan Abdul Rahim (PN–BERSATU)	28,732	27.72%	103,638	Lee Boon Chye (PH–PKR)
P071	Gopeng	143,657	Tan Kar Hing (PH–PKR)	55,880	53.92%	27,148	Cally Ting Zhao Song (BN–MCA)	18,393	17.75%	103,638	Lee Boon Chye (PH–PKR)
P071	Gopeng	143,657	Tan Kar Hing (PH–PKR)	55,880	53.92%	27,148	Balachandran Gopal (WARISAN)	633	0.61%	103,638	Lee Boon Chye (PH–PKR)
P072	Tapah	61,946	Saravanan Murugan (BN–MIC)	18,398	41.36%	5,064	Saraswathy Kandasami (PH–PKR)	13,334	29.98%	44,481	Saravanan Murugan (BN–MIC)
P072	Tapah	61,946	Saravanan Murugan (BN–MIC)	18,398	41.36%	5,064	Muhammad Yadzan Mohammad (PN–BERSATU)	12,115	27.24%	44,481	Saravanan Murugan (BN–MIC)
P072	Tapah	61,946	Saravanan Murugan (BN–MIC)	18,398	41.36%	5,064	Mior Nor Haidir Suhaimi (GTA–PEJUANG)	335	0.75%	44,481	Saravanan Murugan (BN–MIC)
P072	Tapah	61,946	Saravanan Murugan (BN–MIC)	18,398	41.36%	5,064	Mohamed Akbar Sherrif Ali Yasin (WARISAN)	200	0.45%	44,481	Saravanan Murugan (BN–MIC)
P072	Tapah	61,946	Saravanan Murugan (BN–MIC)	18,398	41.36%	5,064	M Kathiravan (IND)	99	0.22%	44,481	Saravanan Murugan (BN–MIC)
P073	Pasir Salak	74,761	Jamaluddin Yahya (PN–PAS)	24,897	43.66%	5,003	Khairul Azwan Harun (BN–UMNO)	19,894	34.89%	57,023	Tajuddin Abdul Rahman (BN–UMNO)
P073	Pasir Salak	74,761	Jamaluddin Yahya (PN–PAS)	24,897	43.66%	5,003	Nik Omar Nik Abdul Aziz (PH–AMANAH)	11,693	20.51%	57,023	Tajuddin Abdul Rahman (BN–UMNO)
P073	Pasir Salak	74,761	Jamaluddin Yahya (PN–PAS)	24,897	43.66%	5,003	Zairol Hizam Zakaria (GTA–PUTRA)	539	0.95%	57,023	Tajuddin Abdul Rahman (BN–UMNO)
P074	Lumut	92,972	Nordin Ahmad Ismail (PN–BERSATU)	25,212	35.43%	363	Zambry Abdul Kadir (BN–UMNO)	24,849	34.92%	71,162	Mohd Hatta Md Ramli (PH–AMANAH)
P074	Lumut	92,972	Nordin Ahmad Ismail (PN–BERSATU)	25,212	35.43%	363	Mohd Hatta Md Ramli (PH–AMANAH)	20,358	28.61%	71,162	Mohd Hatta Md Ramli (PH–AMANAH)
P074	Lumut	92,972	Nordin Ahmad Ismail (PN–BERSATU)	25,212	35.43%	363	Mazlan Abdul Ghani (GTA–PEJUANG)	385	0.54%	71,162	Mohd Hatta Md Ramli (PH–AMANAH)
P074	Lumut	92,972	Nordin Ahmad Ismail (PN–BERSATU)	25,212	35.43%	363	Mohd Isnin Mohd Ismail @ Ibrahim Khan (WARISAN)	358	0.50%	71,162	Mohd Hatta Md Ramli (PH–AMANAH)
P075	Bagan Datuk	58,183	Ahmad Zahid Hamidi (BN–UMNO)	16,578	39.61%	348	Shamsul Iskandar @ Yusre Mohd Akin (PH–PKR)	16,230	38.78%	41,856	Ahmad Zahid Hamidi (BN–UMNO)
P075	Bagan Datuk	58,183	Ahmad Zahid Hamidi (BN–UMNO)	16,578	39.61%	348	Muhammad Faiz Na'aman (PN–BERSATU)	8,822	21.08%	41,856	Ahmad Zahid Hamidi (BN–UMNO)
P075	Bagan Datuk	58,183	Ahmad Zahid Hamidi (BN–UMNO)	16,578	39.61%	348	Tawfik Ismail (IND)	226	0.54%	41,856	Ahmad Zahid Hamidi (BN–UMNO)
P076	Teluk Intan	87,222	Nga Kor Ming (PH–DAP)	33,133	51.61%	15,169	Zainol Fadzi Paharudin (PN–BERSATU)	17,964	27.98%	64,194	Nga Kor Ming (PH–DAP)
P076	Teluk Intan	87,222	Nga Kor Ming (PH–DAP)	33,133	51.61%	15,169	Murugiah Thopasamy (BN–MIC)	12,304	19.17%	64,194	Nga Kor Ming (PH–DAP)
P076	Teluk Intan	87,222	Nga Kor Ming (PH–DAP)	33,133	51.61%	15,169	Amir Khusyairi Mohamad Tanusi (GTA–PEJUANG)	793	1.24%	64,194	Nga Kor Ming (PH–DAP)
P077	Tanjong Malim	93,873	Chang Lih Kang (PH–PKR)	25,140	36.08%	3,541	Nolee Ashilin Mohammed Radzi (PN–BERSATU)	21,599	31.00%	69,671	Chang Lih Kang (PH–PKR)
P077	Tanjong Malim	93,873	Chang Lih Kang (PH–PKR)	25,140	36.08%	3,541	Mah Hang Soon (BN–MCA)	20,963	30.09%	69,671	Chang Lih Kang (PH–PKR)
P077	Tanjong Malim	93,873	Chang Lih Kang (PH–PKR)	25,140	36.08%	3,541	Jamaluddin Mohd Radzi (IND)	1,032	1.48%	69,671	Chang Lih Kang (PH–PKR)
P077	Tanjong Malim	93,873	Chang Lih Kang (PH–PKR)	25,140	36.08%	3,541	Amir Hamzah Abdul Razak (GTA–IMAN)	609	0.87%	69,671	Chang Lih Kang (PH–PKR)
P077	Tanjong Malim	93,873	Chang Lih Kang (PH–PKR)	25,140	36.08%	3,541	Izzat Johari (IND)	328	0.47%	69,671	Chang Lih Kang (PH–PKR)

== Pahang ==
#	Constituency	Registered Electors	Winner	Votes	Votes %	Majority	Opponent(s)	Votes	Votes %	Total valid votes	Incumbent
PN 7 | BN 5 | PH 2 | GTA 0 | Independent 0
P078	Cameron Highlands	46,020	Ramli Mohd Nor (BN–UMNO)	16,120	48.46%	4,544	Chiong Yoke Kong (PH–DAP)	11,576	34.80%	33,265	Ramli Mohd Nor (BN–UMNO)
P078	Cameron Highlands	46,020	Ramli Mohd Nor (BN–UMNO)	16,120	48.46%	4,544	Abdul Rasid Mohamed Ali (PN–BERSATU)	5,569	16.74%	33,265	Ramli Mohd Nor (BN–UMNO)
P079	Lipis	47,124	Abdul Rahman Mohamad (BN–UMNO)	17,672	49.29%	6,117	Mohamad Shahrum Osman (PN–BERSATU)	11,554	32.22%	35,855	Abdul Rahman Mohamad (BN–UMNO)
P079	Lipis	47,124	Abdul Rahman Mohamad (BN–UMNO)	17,672	49.29%	6,117	Tengku Zulpuri Shah Raja Puji (PH–DAP)	6,336	17.75%	35,855	Abdul Rahman Mohamad (BN–UMNO)
P079	Lipis	47,124	Abdul Rahman Mohamad (BN–UMNO)	17,672	49.29%	6,117	Aishaton Abu Bakar (GTA–PEJUANG)	263	0.73%	35,855	Abdul Rahman Mohamad (BN–UMNO)
P080	Raub	75,064	Chow Yu Hui (PH–DAP)	21,613	38.43%	4,357	Fakrunizam Ibrahim (PN–BERSATU)	17,256	30.69%	56,235	Tengku Zulpuri Shah Raja Puji (PH–DAP)
P080	Raub	75,064	Chow Yu Hui (PH–DAP)	21,613	38.43%	4,357	Chong Sin Woon (BN–MCA)	16,939	30.12%	56,235	Tengku Zulpuri Shah Raja Puji (PH–DAP)
P080	Raub	75,064	Chow Yu Hui (PH–DAP)	21,613	38.43%	4,357	Norkhairul Anuar Mohamed Nor (GTA–PEJUANG)	427	0.76%	56,235	Tengku Zulpuri Shah Raja Puji (PH–DAP)
P081	Jerantut	87,051	Khairil Nizam Khirudin (PN–PAS)	31,701	47.49%	8,092	Mohd Zukarmi Abu Bakar (BN–UMNO)	23,609	35.37%	66,754	Ahmad Nazlan Idris (BN–UMNO)
P081	Jerantut	87,051	Khairil Nizam Khirudin (PN–PAS)	31,701	47.49%	8,092	Hassan Basri Awang Mat Dahan (PH–PKR)	11,444	17.14%	66,754	Ahmad Nazlan Idris (BN–UMNO)
P082	Indera Mahkota	120,549	Saifuddin Abdullah (PN–BERSATU)	41,692	44.65%	8,399	Zuraidi Ismail (PH–PKR)	33,293	35.65%	93,379	Saifuddin Abdullah (PN–BERSATU)
P082	Indera Mahkota	120,549	Saifuddin Abdullah (PN–BERSATU)	41,692	44.65%	8,399	Quek Tai Seong (BN–MCA)	16,530	17.70%	93,379	Saifuddin Abdullah (PN–BERSATU)
P082	Indera Mahkota	120,549	Saifuddin Abdullah (PN–BERSATU)	41,692	44.65%	8,399	Mohamad Nor Sundari (GTA–BERJASA)	1,864	2.00%	93,379	Saifuddin Abdullah (PN–BERSATU)
P083	Kuantan	87,597	Wan Razali Wan Nor (PN–PAS)	25,514	37.65%	2,866	Fuziah Salleh (PH–PKR)	22,648	33.42%	67,762	Fuziah Salleh (PH–PKR)
P083	Kuantan	87,597	Wan Razali Wan Nor (PN–PAS)	25,514	37.65%	2,866	Ab Hamid Mohd Nazahar (BN–UMNO)	19,114	28.21%	67,762	Fuziah Salleh (PH–PKR)
P083	Kuantan	87,597	Wan Razali Wan Nor (PN–PAS)	25,514	37.65%	2,866	Anuar Tajuddin (GTA–PEJUANG)	486	0.72%	67,762	Fuziah Salleh (PH–PKR)
P084	Paya Besar	79,744	Mohd. Shahar Abdullah (BN–UMNO)	26,899	43.40%	1,317	Aireroshairi Roslan (PN–PAS)	25,582	41.27%	61,983	Mohd. Shahar Abdullah (BN–UMNO)
P084	Paya Besar	79,744	Mohd. Shahar Abdullah (BN–UMNO)	26,899	43.40%	1,317	Ahmad Azam Mohd Salleh (PH–AMANAH)	9,192	14.83%	61,983	Mohd. Shahar Abdullah (BN–UMNO)
P084	Paya Besar	79,744	Mohd. Shahar Abdullah (BN–UMNO)	26,899	43.40%	1,317	Rosminahar Mohd Amin (GTA–PEJUANG)	310	0.50%	61,983	Mohd. Shahar Abdullah (BN–UMNO)
P085	Pekan	119,443	Sh Mohmed Puzi Sh Ali (BN–UMNO)	47,418	50.96%	8,949	Mohd Fadhil Noor Abdul Karim (PN–PAS)	38,469	41.35%	93,041	VAC
P085	Pekan	119,443	Sh Mohmed Puzi Sh Ali (BN–UMNO)	47,418	50.96%	8,949	Mohd Naim Zainal Abidin (PH–PKR)	6,316	6.79%	93,041	VAC
P085	Pekan	119,443	Sh Mohmed Puzi Sh Ali (BN–UMNO)	47,418	50.96%	8,949	Mohammad Radhi Abdul Razak (GTA–PEJUANG)	472	0.51%	93,041	VAC
P085	Pekan	119,443	Sh Mohmed Puzi Sh Ali (BN–UMNO)	47,418	50.96%	8,949	Tengku Zainul Hisham Tengku Hussin (IND)	366	0.39%	93,041	VAC
P086	Maran	53,128	Ismail Abdul Muttalib (PN–PAS)	19,600	47.70%	1,821	Shahaniza Shamsuddin (BN–UMNO)	17,779	43.27%	41,092	Ismail Abdul Muttalib (BN–UMNO)
P086	Maran	53,128	Ismail Abdul Muttalib (PN–PAS)	19,600	47.70%	1,821	Ahmad Shuhor Awang (PH–AMANAH)	3,547	8.63%	41,092	Ismail Abdul Muttalib (BN–UMNO)
P086	Maran	53,128	Ismail Abdul Muttalib (PN–PAS)	19,600	47.70%	1,821	Muhamad Hafiz Al-Hafiz (IND)	166	0.40%	41,092	Ismail Abdul Muttalib (BN–UMNO)
P087	Kuala Krau	60,537	Kamal Ashaari (PN–PAS)	22,505	47.13%	1,024	Ismail Mohamed Said (BN–UMNO)	21,481	44.98%	47,753	Ismail Mohamed Said (BN–UMNO)
P087	Kuala Krau	60,537	Kamal Ashaari (PN–PAS)	22,505	47.13%	1,024	Juhari Osman (PH–AMANAH)	3,593	7.52%	47,753	Ismail Mohamed Said (BN–UMNO)
P087	Kuala Krau	60,537	Kamal Ashaari (PN–PAS)	22,505	47.13%	1,024	Shahruddin Mohamed Salleh (GTA–PEJUANG)	174	0.36%	47,753	Ismail Mohamed Said (BN–UMNO)
P088	Temerloh	106,829	Salamiah Mohd Nor (PN–PAS)	30,929	37.43%	5,520	Mohd Hasbie Muda (PH–AMANAH)	25,409	30.75%	82,637	Mohd Anuar Mohd Tahir (PH–AMANAH)
P088	Temerloh	106,829	Salamiah Mohd Nor (PN–PAS)	30,929	37.43%	5,520	Mohd Sharkar Shamsudin (BN–UMNO)	25,191	30.48%	82,637	Mohd Anuar Mohd Tahir (PH–AMANAH)
P088	Temerloh	106,829	Salamiah Mohd Nor (PN–PAS)	30,929	37.43%	5,520	Aminuddin Yahya (GTA–GB)	1,108	1.34%	82,637	Mohd Anuar Mohd Tahir (PH–AMANAH)
P089	Bentong	87,058	Young Syefura Othman (PH–DAP)	25,075	37.62%	692	Liow Tiong Lai (BN–MCA)	24,383	36.58%	66,657	Wong Tack (PH–DAP)
P089	Bentong	87,058	Young Syefura Othman (PH–DAP)	25,075	37.62%	692	Roslan Hassan (PN–BERSATU)	16,233	24.35%	66,657	Wong Tack (PH–DAP)
P089	Bentong	87,058	Young Syefura Othman (PH–DAP)	25,075	37.62%	692	Wong Tack (IND)	798	1.20%	66,657	Wong Tack (PH–DAP)
P089	Bentong	87,058	Young Syefura Othman (PH–DAP)	25,075	37.62%	692	Mohd Khalil Abdul Hamid (IND)	168	0.25%	66,657	Wong Tack (PH–DAP)
P090	Bera	77,669	Ismail Sabri Yaakob (BN–UMNO)	31,762	53.34%	16,695	Abas Awang (PH–PKR)	15,067	25.30%	59,548	Ismail Sabri Yaakob (BN–UMNO)
P090	Bera	77,669	Ismail Sabri Yaakob (BN–UMNO)	31,762	53.34%	16,695	Asmawi Harun (PN–BERSATU)	12,719	21.36%	59,548	Ismail Sabri Yaakob (BN–UMNO)
P091	Rompin	89,131	Abdul Khalib Abdullah (PN–BERSATU)	31,589	47.20%	1,438	Hasan Arifin (BN–UMNO)	30,151	45.05%	66,927	Hasan Arifin (BN–UMNO)
P091	Rompin	89,131	Abdul Khalib Abdullah (PN–BERSATU)	31,589	47.20%	1,438	Erman Shah Jaios (PH–PKR)	4,779	7.14%	66,927	Hasan Arifin (BN–UMNO)
P091	Rompin	89,131	Abdul Khalib Abdullah (PN–BERSATU)	31,589	47.20%	1,438	Hamizi Hussain (IND)	408	0.61%	66,927	Hasan Arifin (BN–UMNO)

== Selangor ==
#	Constituency	Registered Electors	Winner	Votes	Votes %	Majority	Opponent(s)	Votes	Votes %	Total valid votes	Incumbent
PH 16 | PN 6 | BN 0 | GTA 0 | WARISAN 0 | PRM 0 | PBM 0 | PUR 0 | Independent 0
P092	Sabak Bernam	51,609	Kalam Salan (PN–BERSATU)	17,973	43.86%	5,056	Abdul Rahman Bakri (BN–UMNO)	12,917	31.52%	40,977	Mohamad Fasiah Mohd Fakeh (PN–BERSATU)
P092	Sabak Bernam	51,609	Kalam Salan (PN–BERSATU)	17,973	43.86%	5,056	Shamsul Ma'arif Ismail (PH–AMANAH)	9,627	23.49%	40,977	Mohamad Fasiah Mohd Fakeh (PN–BERSATU)
P092	Sabak Bernam	51,609	Kalam Salan (PN–BERSATU)	17,973	43.86%	5,056	Idris Mat Yusof (GTA–GB)	460	1.12%	40,977	Mohamad Fasiah Mohd Fakeh (PN–BERSATU)
P093	Sungai Besar	64,382	Muslimin Yahaya (PN–BERSATU)	19,791	38.75%	2,721	Saipolyazan Mat Yusop (PH–PKR)	17,070	33.42%	51,070	Muslimin Yahaya (PN–BERSATU)
P093	Sungai Besar	64,382	Muslimin Yahaya (PN–BERSATU)	19,791	38.75%	2,721	Jamal Yunos (BN–UMNO)	13,984	27.38%	51,070	Muslimin Yahaya (PN–BERSATU)
P093	Sungai Besar	64,382	Muslimin Yahaya (PN–BERSATU)	19,791	38.75%	2,721	Asmawar Samat @ Samad (GTA–PUTRA)	225	0.44%	51,070	Muslimin Yahaya (PN–BERSATU)
P094	Hulu Selangor	154,317	Mohd Hasnizan Harun (PN–PAS)	46,823	38.24%	1,562	Sathia Prakash Nadarajan (PH–PKR)	45,261	36.97%	122,442	June Leow Hsiad Hui (PH–PKR)
P094	Hulu Selangor	154,317	Mohd Hasnizan Harun (PN–PAS)	46,823	38.24%	1,562	Mohan Thangarasu (BN–MIC)	27,050	22.09%	122,442	June Leow Hsiad Hui (PH–PKR)
P094	Hulu Selangor	154,317	Mohd Hasnizan Harun (PN–PAS)	46,823	38.24%	1,562	Harumaini Omar (GTA–PEJUANG)	1,849	1.51%	122,442	June Leow Hsiad Hui (PH–PKR)
P094	Hulu Selangor	154,317	Mohd Hasnizan Harun (PN–PAS)	46,823	38.24%	1,562	Haniza Mohamed Talha (PBM)	1,013	0.83%	122,442	June Leow Hsiad Hui (PH–PKR)
P094	Hulu Selangor	154,317	Mohd Hasnizan Harun (PN–PAS)	46,823	38.24%	1,562	Azlinda Baroni (IND)	446	0.36%	122,442	June Leow Hsiad Hui (PH–PKR)
P095	Tanjong Karang	62,194	Zulkafperi Hanapi (PN–BERSATU)	18,054	35.26%	2,180	Habibah Mohd Yusof (BN–UMNO)	15,874	31.00%	51,205	Noh Omar (BN–UMNO)
P095	Tanjong Karang	62,194	Zulkafperi Hanapi (PN–BERSATU)	18,054	35.26%	2,180	Siti Rahayu Baharin (MUDA)	12,314	24.05%	51,205	Noh Omar (BN–UMNO)
P095	Tanjong Karang	62,194	Zulkafperi Hanapi (PN–BERSATU)	18,054	35.26%	2,180	Azlan Sani Zawawi (GTA–GB)	3,557	6.95%	51,205	Noh Omar (BN–UMNO)
P095	Tanjong Karang	62,194	Zulkafperi Hanapi (PN–BERSATU)	18,054	35.26%	2,180	Mohd Rosni Mastol (IND)	1,406	2.75%	51,205	Noh Omar (BN–UMNO)
P096	Kuala Selangor	102,951	Dzulkefly Ahmad (PH–AMANAH)	31,033	35.88%	1,002	Tengku Zafrul Aziz (BN–UMNO)	30,031	34.73%	86,481	Dzulkefly Ahmad (PH–AMANAH)
P096	Kuala Selangor	102,951	Dzulkefly Ahmad (PH–AMANAH)	31,033	35.88%	1,002	Mohd Noor Mohd Sahar (PN–PAS)	23,639	27.33%	86,481	Dzulkefly Ahmad (PH–AMANAH)
P096	Kuala Selangor	102,951	Dzulkefly Ahmad (PH–AMANAH)	31,033	35.88%	1,002	Mohd Shaid Rosli (GTA–PEJUANG)	1,778	2.06%	86,481	Dzulkefly Ahmad (PH–AMANAH)
P097	Selayang	181,539	William Leong Jee Keen (PH–PKR)	72,773	50.23%	23,619	Abdul Rashid Asari (PN–BERSATU)	49,154	33.93%	144,881	William Leong Jee Keen (PH–PKR)
P097	Selayang	181,539	William Leong Jee Keen (PH–PKR)	72,773	50.23%	23,619	Chan Wun Hoong (BN–MCA)	19,425	13.41%	144,881	William Leong Jee Keen (PH–PKR)
P097	Selayang	181,539	William Leong Jee Keen (PH–PKR)	72,773	50.23%	23,619	Salleh Amiruddin (GTA–PEJUANG)	2,584	1.78%	144,881	William Leong Jee Keen (PH–PKR)
P097	Selayang	181,539	William Leong Jee Keen (PH–PKR)	72,773	50.23%	23,619	Muhammad Zaki Omar (IND)	945	0.65%	144,881	William Leong Jee Keen (PH–PKR)
P098	Gombak	206,744	Amirudin Shari (PH–PKR)	72,267	43.69%	12,729	Mohamed Azmin Ali (PN–BERSATU)	59,538	35.99%	165,426	Mohamed Azmin Ali (PN–BERSATU)
P098	Gombak	206,744	Amirudin Shari (PH–PKR)	72,267	43.69%	12,729	Megat Zulkarnain Omardin (BN–UMNO)	30,723	18.57%	165,426	Mohamed Azmin Ali (PN–BERSATU)
P098	Gombak	206,744	Amirudin Shari (PH–PKR)	72,267	43.69%	12,729	Aziz Jamaludin Mohd Tahir (GTA–PUTRA)	2,223	1.54%	165,426	Mohamed Azmin Ali (PN–BERSATU)
P098	Gombak	206,744	Amirudin Shari (PH–PKR)	72,267	43.69%	12,729	Zulkifli Ahmad (IND)	675	0.41%	165,426	Mohamed Azmin Ali (PN–BERSATU)
P099	Ampang	133,494	Rodziah Ismail (PH–PKR)	56,754	54.35%	29,681	Sasha Lyna Abdul Latif (PN–BERSATU)	27,073	25.92%	104,430	Zuraida Kamaruddin (PBM)
P099	Ampang	133,494	Rodziah Ismail (PH–PKR)	56,754	54.35%	29,681	Ivone Low Yi Wen (BN–MCA)	11,509	11.02%	104,430	Zuraida Kamaruddin (PBM)
P099	Ampang	133,494	Rodziah Ismail (PH–PKR)	56,754	54.35%	29,681	Zuraida Kamaruddin (PBM)	4,589	4.39%	104,430	Zuraida Kamaruddin (PBM)
P099	Ampang	133,494	Rodziah Ismail (PH–PKR)	56,754	54.35%	29,681	Nurul Ashikin Mabahwi (GTA–PEJUANG)	2,653	2.54%	104,430	Zuraida Kamaruddin (PBM)
P099	Ampang	133,494	Rodziah Ismail (PH–PKR)	56,754	54.35%	29,681	Bryan Lai Wai Chong (WARISAN)	1,423	1.36%	104,430	Zuraida Kamaruddin (PBM)
P099	Ampang	133,494	Rodziah Ismail (PH–PKR)	56,754	54.35%	29,681	Muhammad Shafiq Izwan Mohd Yunos (IND)	188	0.18%	104,430	Zuraida Kamaruddin (PBM)
P099	Ampang	133,494	Rodziah Ismail (PH–PKR)	56,754	54.35%	29,681	Raveendran Marnokaran (IND)	148	0.14%	104,430	Zuraida Kamaruddin (PBM)
P099	Ampang	133,494	Rodziah Ismail (PH–PKR)	56,754	54.35%	29,681	Tan Hua Meng (IND)	93	0.09%	104,430	Zuraida Kamaruddin (PBM)
P100	Pandan	148,730	Rafizi Ramli (PH–PKR)	74,002	63.98%	48,296	Muhammad Rafique Zubir (PN–PAS)	25,706	22.23%	115,656	Wan Azizah Wan Ismail (PH–PKR)
P100	Pandan	148,730	Rafizi Ramli (PH–PKR)	74,002	63.98%	48,296	Leong Kok Wee (BN–MCA)	11,664	10.09%	115,656	Wan Azizah Wan Ismail (PH–PKR)
P100	Pandan	148,730	Rafizi Ramli (PH–PKR)	74,002	63.98%	48,296	Ong Tee Keat (WARISAN)	3,323	2.87%	115,656	Wan Azizah Wan Ismail (PH–PKR)
P100	Pandan	148,730	Rafizi Ramli (PH–PKR)	74,002	63.98%	48,296	Nadia Hanafiah (GTA–GB)	961	0.83%	115,656	Wan Azizah Wan Ismail (PH–PKR)
P101	Hulu Langat	166,902	Mohd Sany Hamzan (PH–AMANAH)	58,382	42.68%	14,896	Mohd Radzi Abd Latif (PN–BERSATU)	43,486	31.79%	136,789	Hasanuddin Mohd Yunus (PH–AMANAH)
P101	Hulu Langat	166,902	Mohd Sany Hamzan (PH–AMANAH)	58,382	42.68%	14,896	Johan Abdul Aziz (BN–UMNO)	32,570	23.81%	136,789	Hasanuddin Mohd Yunus (PH–AMANAH)
P101	Hulu Langat	166,902	Mohd Sany Hamzan (PH–AMANAH)	58,382	42.68%	14,896	Markiman Kobiran (GTA–PEJUANG)	1,655	1.21%	136,789	Hasanuddin Mohd Yunus (PH–AMANAH)
P101	Hulu Langat	166,902	Mohd Sany Hamzan (PH–AMANAH)	58,382	42.68%	14,896	Abdul Rahman Jaafar (WARISAN)	370	0.27%	136,789	Hasanuddin Mohd Yunus (PH–AMANAH)
P101	Hulu Langat	166,902	Mohd Sany Hamzan (PH–AMANAH)	58,382	42.68%	14,896	Muhammad Mustafa (IND)	326	0.24%	136,789	Hasanuddin Mohd Yunus (PH–AMANAH)
P102	Bangi	303,430	Syahredzan Johan (PH–DAP)	141,568	57.95%	69,701	Muhammad Nazrul Hakim Md. Nazir (PN–PAS)	71,867	29.42%	244,291	Ong Kian Ming (PH–DAP)
P102	Bangi	303,430	Syahredzan Johan (PH–DAP)	141,568	57.95%	69,701	Hoh Hee Lee (BN–MCA)	25,685	10.51%	244,291	Ong Kian Ming (PH–DAP)
P102	Bangi	303,430	Syahredzan Johan (PH–DAP)	141,568	57.95%	69,701	Annuar Salleh (GTA–BERJASA)	3,148	1.29%	244,291	Ong Kian Ming (PH–DAP)
P102	Bangi	303,430	Syahredzan Johan (PH–DAP)	141,568	57.95%	69,701	Chee Chee Meng (PRM)	752	0.31%	244,291	Ong Kian Ming (PH–DAP)
P102	Bangi	303,430	Syahredzan Johan (PH–DAP)	141,568	57.95%	69,701	Jamal Hisham Hashim (IND)	676	0.28%	244,291	Ong Kian Ming (PH–DAP)
P102	Bangi	303,430	Syahredzan Johan (PH–DAP)	141,568	57.95%	69,701	Muhammad Fauzi Hasim (IND)	401	0.16%	244,291	Ong Kian Ming (PH–DAP)
P102	Bangi	303,430	Syahredzan Johan (PH–DAP)	141,568	57.95%	69,701	Suthan Mookiah (IND)	194	0.08%	244,291	Ong Kian Ming (PH–DAP)
P103	Puchong	152,861	Yeo Bee Yin (PH–DAP)	79,425	65.67%	57,957	Syed Ibrahim Syed Abdul Kader (BN–KIMMA)	21,468	17.75%	120,949	Gobind Singh Deo (PH–DAP)
P103	Puchong	152,861	Yeo Bee Yin (PH–DAP)	79,425	65.67%	57,957	Jimmy Chew Jyh Gang (PN–GERAKAN)	18,263	15.10%	120,949	Gobind Singh Deo (PH–DAP)
P103	Puchong	152,861	Yeo Bee Yin (PH–DAP)	79,425	65.67%	57,957	Kuan Chee Heng (IND)	1,793	1.48%	120,949	Gobind Singh Deo (PH–DAP)
P104	Subang	230,940	Wong Chen (PH–PKR)	138,259	77.68%	115,074	Alex Ang Hiang Ni (PN–GERAKAN)	23,185	13.03%	177,983	Wong Chen (PH–PKR)
P104	Subang	230,940	Wong Chen (PH–PKR)	138,259	77.68%	115,074	Kow Cheong Wei (BN–MCA)	16,539	9.29%	177,983	Wong Chen (PH–PKR)
P105	Petaling Jaya	195,148	Lee Chean Chung (PH–PKR)	83,311	57.12%	50,515	Theng Book (PN–BERSATU)	32,736	22.44%	145,862	Maria Chin Abdullah (PH–PKR)
P105	Petaling Jaya	195,148	Lee Chean Chung (PH–PKR)	83,311	57.12%	50,515	Chew Hian Tat (BN–MCA)	23,253	15.94%	145,862	Maria Chin Abdullah (PH–PKR)
P105	Petaling Jaya	195,148	Lee Chean Chung (PH–PKR)	83,311	57.12%	50,515	Mazween Mokhtar (GTA–GB)	4,052	2.78%	145,862	Maria Chin Abdullah (PH–PKR)
P105	Petaling Jaya	195,148	Lee Chean Chung (PH–PKR)	83,311	57.12%	50,515	Ezam Mohd Nor (PRM)	2,049	1.40%	145,862	Maria Chin Abdullah (PH–PKR)
P105	Petaling Jaya	195,148	Lee Chean Chung (PH–PKR)	83,311	57.12%	50,515	K J John (IND)	461	0.32%	145,862	Maria Chin Abdullah (PH–PKR)
P106	Damansara	239,103	Gobind Singh Deo (PH–DAP)	142,875	81.67%	124,619	Lim Si Ching (PN–GERAKAN)	18,256	10.44%	174,937	Tony Pua Kiam Wee (PH–DAP)
P106	Damansara	239,103	Gobind Singh Deo (PH–DAP)	142,875	81.67%	124,619	Tan Gim Tuan (BN–MCA)	13,806	7.89%	174,937	Tony Pua Kiam Wee (PH–DAP)
P107	Sungai Buloh	158,090	Ramanan Ramakrishnan (PH–PKR)	50,943	39.30%	2,693	Khairy Jamaluddin (BN–UMNO)	48,250	37.22%	129,639	Sivarasa Rasiah (PH–PKR)
P107	Sungai Buloh	158,090	Ramanan Ramakrishnan (PH–PKR)	50,943	39.30%	2,693	Mohd Ghazali Md Hamin (PN–PAS)	29,060	22.42%	129,639	Sivarasa Rasiah (PH–PKR)
P107	Sungai Buloh	158,090	Ramanan Ramakrishnan (PH–PKR)	50,943	39.30%	2,693	Mohd Akmal Mohd Yusoff (GTA–PEJUANG)	829	0.64%	129,639	Sivarasa Rasiah (PH–PKR)
P107	Sungai Buloh	158,090	Ramanan Ramakrishnan (PH–PKR)	50,943	39.30%	2,693	Ahmad Zuhri Faisal (PRM)	279	0.22%	129,639	Sivarasa Rasiah (PH–PKR)
P107	Sungai Buloh	158,090	Ramanan Ramakrishnan (PH–PKR)	50,943	39.30%	2,693	Syed Abdul Razak Syed Long Alsagoff (IND)	165	0.13%	129,639	Sivarasa Rasiah (PH–PKR)
P107	Sungai Buloh	158,090	Ramanan Ramakrishnan (PH–PKR)	50,943	39.30%	2,693	Nurhaslinda Basri (IND)	113	0.09%	129,639	Sivarasa Rasiah (PH–PKR)
P108	Shah Alam	165,744	Azli Yusof (PH–AMANAH)	61,409	45.23%	18,095	Afif Bahardin (PN–BERSATU)	43,314	31.90%	135,770	Khalid Abdul Samad (PH–AMANAH)
P108	Shah Alam	165,744	Azli Yusof (PH–AMANAH)	61,409	45.23%	18,095	Hizatul Isham Abdul Jalil (BN–UMNO)	28,266	20.82%	135,770	Khalid Abdul Samad (PH–AMANAH)
P108	Shah Alam	165,744	Azli Yusof (PH–AMANAH)	61,409	45.23%	18,095	Muhammad Rafique Rashid Ali (GTA–PEJUANG)	2,781	2.05%	135,770	Khalid Abdul Samad (PH–AMANAH)
P109	Kapar	189,369	Halimah Ali (PN–PAS)	65,751	41.61%	11,782	Abdullah Sani Abdul Hamid (PH–PKR)	53,969	34.15%	158,030	Abdullah Sani Abdul Hamid (PH–PKR)
P109	Kapar	189,369	Halimah Ali (PN–PAS)	65,751	41.61%	11,782	Muhammad Noor Azman (BN–UMNO)	35,079	22.20%	158,030	Abdullah Sani Abdul Hamid (PH–PKR)
P109	Kapar	189,369	Halimah Ali (PN–PAS)	65,751	41.61%	11,782	Daroyah Alwi (PBM)	1,474	0.93%	158,030	Abdullah Sani Abdul Hamid (PH–PKR)
P109	Kapar	189,369	Halimah Ali (PN–PAS)	65,751	41.61%	11,782	Mohd Pathan Hussin (GTA–BERJASA)	1,015	0.64%	158,030	Abdullah Sani Abdul Hamid (PH–PKR)
P109	Kapar	189,369	Halimah Ali (PN–PAS)	65,751	41.61%	11,782	VP Sevelinggam (IND)	477	0.30%	158,030	Abdullah Sani Abdul Hamid (PH–PKR)
P109	Kapar	189,369	Halimah Ali (PN–PAS)	65,751	41.61%	11,782	Rahim Awang (WARISAN)	265	0.17%	158,030	Abdullah Sani Abdul Hamid (PH–PKR)
P110	Klang	208,913	Ganabatirau Veraman (PH–DAP)	115,539	70.49%	91,801	Jaya Chandran Perumal (PN–BERSATU)	23,738	14.48%	163,905	Charles Anthony Santiago (PH–DAP)
P110	Klang	208,913	Ganabatirau Veraman (PH–DAP)	115,539	70.49%	91,801	Tee Hooi Ling (BN–MCA)	19,762	12.06%	163,905	Charles Anthony Santiago (PH–DAP)
P110	Klang	208,913	Ganabatirau Veraman (PH–DAP)	115,539	70.49%	91,801	Hedrhin Ramli @ Awin (IND)	3,016	1.84%	163,905	Charles Anthony Santiago (PH–DAP)
P110	Klang	208,913	Ganabatirau Veraman (PH–DAP)	115,539	70.49%	91,801	Loo Cheng Wee (WARISAN)	1,140	0.70%	163,905	Charles Anthony Santiago (PH–DAP)
P110	Klang	208,913	Ganabatirau Veraman (PH–DAP)	115,539	70.49%	91,801	JR Deepak Jaikishan (IND)	439	0.27%	163,905	Charles Anthony Santiago (PH–DAP)
P110	Klang	208,913	Ganabatirau Veraman (PH–DAP)	115,539	70.49%	91,801	Chandra Sivarajan (PRM)	271	0.17%	163,905	Charles Anthony Santiago (PH–DAP)
P111	Kota Raja	244,712	Mohamad Sabu (PH–AMANAH)	123,306	62.36%	73,998	Mohamed Diah Baharun (PN–PAS)	49,308	24.94%	197,740	Mohamad Sabu (PH–AMANAH)
P111	Kota Raja	244,712	Mohamad Sabu (PH–AMANAH)	123,306	62.36%	73,998	Kajendran Doraisamy (BN–MIC)	22,225	11.24%	197,740	Mohamad Sabu (PH–AMANAH)
P111	Kota Raja	244,712	Mohamad Sabu (PH–AMANAH)	123,306	62.36%	73,998	Fahmi Bazlan Muda (GTA–BERJASA)	2,063	1.04%	197,740	Mohamad Sabu (PH–AMANAH)
P111	Kota Raja	244,712	Mohamad Sabu (PH–AMANAH)	123,306	62.36%	73,998	Che Sara Afiqah Zainul Arif (PRM)	360	0.18%	197,740	Mohamad Sabu (PH–AMANAH)
P111	Kota Raja	244,712	Mohamad Sabu (PH–AMANAH)	123,306	62.36%	73,998	Kumar Karananendi (IND)	209	0.11%	197,740	Mohamad Sabu (PH–AMANAH)
P111	Kota Raja	244,712	Mohamad Sabu (PH–AMANAH)	123,306	62.36%	73,998	P Raveentharan A Periasamy (IND)	163	0.08%	197,740	Mohamad Sabu (PH–AMANAH)
P111	Kota Raja	244,712	Mohamad Sabu (PH–AMANAH)	123,306	62.36%	73,998	Suhendhar Selvaraju (IND)	106	0.05%	197,740	Mohamad Sabu (PH–AMANAH)
P112	Kuala Langat	148,637	Ahmad Yunus Hairi (PN–PAS)	52,867	42.68%	1,833	Manivannan Gowindasamy (PH–PKR)	51,034	41.20%	123,860	Xavier Jayakumar Arulanandam (PBM)
P112	Kuala Langat	148,637	Ahmad Yunus Hairi (PN–PAS)	52,867	42.68%	1,833	Mohana Muniandy Raman (BN–MIC)	18,685	15.09%	123,860	Xavier Jayakumar Arulanandam (PBM)
P112	Kuala Langat	148,637	Ahmad Yunus Hairi (PN–PAS)	52,867	42.68%	1,833	Mohd Ridzuan Abdullah (GTA–GB)	591	0.48%	123,860	Xavier Jayakumar Arulanandam (PBM)
P112	Kuala Langat	148,637	Ahmad Yunus Hairi (PN–PAS)	52,867	42.68%	1,833	Zanariah Jumhuri (IND)	512	0.41%	123,860	Xavier Jayakumar Arulanandam (PBM)
P112	Kuala Langat	148,637	Ahmad Yunus Hairi (PN–PAS)	52,867	42.68%	1,833	Gaveson Murugeson (PRM)	171	0.14%	123,860	Xavier Jayakumar Arulanandam (PBM)
P113	Sepang	168,039	Raj Munni Sabu @ Aiman Athirah (PH–AMANAH)	56,264	40.78%	8,949	Rina Mohd Harun (PN–BERSATU)	47,315	34.30%	137,955	Mohamed Hanipa Maidin (PH–AMANAH)
P113	Sepang	168,039	Raj Munni Sabu @ Aiman Athirah (PH–AMANAH)	56,264	40.78%	8,949	Anuar Basiran (BN–UMNO)	31,097	22.54%	137,955	Mohamed Hanipa Maidin (PH–AMANAH)
P113	Sepang	168,039	Raj Munni Sabu @ Aiman Athirah (PH–AMANAH)	56,264	40.78%	8,949	Che Asmah Ibrahim (GTA–PEJUANG)	2,337	1.69%	137,955	Mohamed Hanipa Maidin (PH–AMANAH)
P113	Sepang	168,039	Raj Munni Sabu @ Aiman Athirah (PH–AMANAH)	56,264	40.78%	8,949	Shahrul Amri Mat Sari (IND)	319	0.23%	137,955	Mohamed Hanipa Maidin (PH–AMANAH)
P113	Sepang	168,039	Raj Munni Sabu @ Aiman Athirah (PH–AMANAH)	56,264	40.78%	8,949	Mohd Daud Leong Abdullah (PUR)	264	0.19%	137,955	Mohamed Hanipa Maidin (PH–AMANAH)
P113	Sepang	168,039	Raj Munni Sabu @ Aiman Athirah (PH–AMANAH)	56,264	40.78%	8,949	Muneswaran Muthiah (IND)	194	0.14%	137,955	Mohamed Hanipa Maidin (PH–AMANAH)
P113	Sepang	168,039	Raj Munni Sabu @ Aiman Athirah (PH–AMANAH)	56,264	40.78%	8,949	Nageswaran Ravi (PRM)	165	0.12%	137,955	Mohamed Hanipa Maidin (PH–AMANAH)

== Federal Territory of Kuala Lumpur ==
#	Constituency	Registered Electors	Winner	Votes	Votes %	Majority	Opponent(s)	Votes	Votes %	Total valid votes	Incumbent
PH 10 | BN 1 | PN 0 | GTA 0 | WARISAN 0 | PRM 0 | Independent 0
P114	Kepong	94,285	Lim Lip Eng (PH–DAP)	64,308	88.92%	61,081	Yap Zheng Hoe (BN–MCA)	3,227	4.46%	72,319	Lim Lip Eng (PH–DAP)
P114	Kepong	94,285	Lim Lip Eng (PH–DAP)	64,308	88.92%	61,081	Phang Jing Fatt (PN–GERAKAN)	2,795	3.86%	72,319	Lim Lip Eng (PH–DAP)
P114	Kepong	94,285	Lim Lip Eng (PH–DAP)	64,308	88.92%	61,081	Yee Poh Ping (IND)	1,461	2.02%	72,319	Lim Lip Eng (PH–DAP)
P114	Kepong	94,285	Lim Lip Eng (PH–DAP)	64,308	88.92%	61,081	Young Shang Yi (WARISAN)	528	0.73%	72,319	Lim Lip Eng (PH–DAP)
P115	Batu	113,863	Prabakaran Parameswaran (PH–PKR)	45,716	52.46%	22,241	Azhar Yahya (PN–PAS)	23,475	26.94%	87,146	Prabakaran Parameswaran (PH–PKR)
P115	Batu	113,863	Prabakaran Parameswaran (PH–PKR)	45,716	52.46%	22,241	A. Kohilan Pillay G. Appu (BN–MIC)	10,398	11.38%	87,146	Prabakaran Parameswaran (PH–PKR)
P115	Batu	113,863	Prabakaran Parameswaran (PH–PKR)	45,716	52.46%	22,241	Chua Tian Chang (IND)	4,603	5.28%	87,146	Prabakaran Parameswaran (PH–PKR)
P115	Batu	113,863	Prabakaran Parameswaran (PH–PKR)	45,716	52.46%	22,241	Wan Azliana Wan Adnan (GTA–PEJUANG)	849	0.97%	87,146	Prabakaran Parameswaran (PH–PKR)
P115	Batu	113,863	Prabakaran Parameswaran (PH–PKR)	45,716	52.46%	22,241	Siti Zabedah Kasim (IND)	653	0.75%	87,146	Prabakaran Parameswaran (PH–PKR)
P115	Batu	113,863	Prabakaran Parameswaran (PH–PKR)	45,716	52.46%	22,241	Nur Fathiah Syazwana Shaharuddin (IND)	628	0.72%	87,146	Prabakaran Parameswaran (PH–PKR)
P115	Batu	113,863	Prabakaran Parameswaran (PH–PKR)	45,716	52.46%	22,241	Naganathan Pillai (WARISAN)	575	0.66%	87,146	Prabakaran Parameswaran (PH–PKR)
P115	Batu	113,863	Prabakaran Parameswaran (PH–PKR)	45,716	52.46%	22,241	Zulkifli Abdul Fadlan (PRM)	137	0.16%	87,146	Prabakaran Parameswaran (PH–PKR)
P115	Batu	113,863	Prabakaran Parameswaran (PH–PKR)	45,716	52.46%	22,241	Too Gao Lan @ Too Cheng Huat (IND)	112	0.13%	87,146	Prabakaran Parameswaran (PH–PKR)
P116	Wangsa Maju	120,323	Zahir Hassan (PH–PKR)	46,031	49.63%	20,696	Nuridah Mohd Salleh (PN–PAS)	25,335	27.32%	92,740	Tan Yee Kew (PH–PKR)
P116	Wangsa Maju	120,323	Zahir Hassan (PH–PKR)	46,031	49.63%	20,696	Mohd Shafei Abdullah (BN–UMNO)	19,595	21.13%	92,740	Tan Yee Kew (PH–PKR)
P116	Wangsa Maju	120,323	Zahir Hassan (PH–PKR)	46,031	49.63%	20,696	Norzaila Arifin (GTA–PUTRA)	987	1.06%	92,740	Tan Yee Kew (PH–PKR)
P116	Wangsa Maju	120,323	Zahir Hassan (PH–PKR)	46,031	49.63%	20,696	Wee Choo Keong (WARISAN)	576	0.62%	92,740	Tan Yee Kew (PH–PKR)
P116	Wangsa Maju	120,323	Zahir Hassan (PH–PKR)	46,031	49.63%	20,696	Raveentheran Suntheralingam (IND)	216	0.23%	92,740	Tan Yee Kew (PH–PKR)
P117	Segambut	119,652	Hannah Yeoh Tseow Suan (PH–DAP)	68,438	80.05%	59,684	Prabagaran Vythilingam (PN–GERAKAN)	8,754	10.24%	85,496	Hannah Yeoh Tseow Suan (PH–DAP)
P117	Segambut	119,652	Hannah Yeoh Tseow Suan (PH–DAP)	68,438	80.05%	59,684	Daniel Ling Sia Chin (BN–MCA)	8,304	9.71%	85,496	Hannah Yeoh Tseow Suan (PH–DAP)
P118	Setiawangsa	95,753	Nik Nazmi Nik Ahmad (PH–PKR)	34,434	46.06%	12,164	Nurul Fadzilah Kamarulddin (PN–BERSATU)	22,270	29.79%	74,764	Nik Nazmi Nik Ahmad (PH–PKR)
P118	Setiawangsa	95,753	Nik Nazmi Nik Ahmad (PH–PKR)	34,434	46.06%	12,164	Izudin Ishak (BN–UMNO)	16,333	21.85%	74,764	Nik Nazmi Nik Ahmad (PH–PKR)
P118	Setiawangsa	95,753	Nik Nazmi Nik Ahmad (PH–PKR)	34,434	46.06%	12,164	Bibi Sunita Sakandar Khan (GTA–PEJUANG)	953	1.27%	74,764	Nik Nazmi Nik Ahmad (PH–PKR)
P118	Setiawangsa	95,753	Nik Nazmi Nik Ahmad (PH–PKR)	34,434	46.06%	12,164	Mior Rosli Mior Mohd Jaafar (IND)	492	0.66%	74,764	Nik Nazmi Nik Ahmad (PH–PKR)
P118	Setiawangsa	95,753	Nik Nazmi Nik Ahmad (PH–PKR)	34,434	46.06%	12,164	Stanley Lim Yen Tiong (IND)	282	0.38%	74,764	Nik Nazmi Nik Ahmad (PH–PKR)
P119	Titiwangsa	80,747	Johari Abdul Ghani (BN–UMNO)	25,042	41.15%	4,632	Khalid Samad (PH–AMANAH)	20,410	33.54%	60,858	Rina Mohd Harun (PN–BERSATU)
P119	Titiwangsa	80,747	Johari Abdul Ghani (BN–UMNO)	25,042	41.15%	4,632	Rosni Adam (PN–PAS)	14,518	23.86%	60,858	Rina Mohd Harun (PN–BERSATU)
P119	Titiwangsa	80,747	Johari Abdul Ghani (BN–UMNO)	25,042	41.15%	4,632	Khairuddin Abu Hassan (GTA–PEJUANG)	888	1.46%	60,858	Rina Mohd Harun (PN–BERSATU)
P120	Bukit Bintang	79,782	Fong Kui Lun (PH–DAP)	43,827	82.79%	38,977	Tan Teik Peng (BN–MCA)	4,850	9.16%	52,936	Fong Kui Lun (PH–DAP)
P120	Bukit Bintang	79,782	Fong Kui Lun (PH–DAP)	43,827	82.79%	38,977	Edwin Chen Win Keong (PN–BERSATU)	4,259	8.05%	52,936	Fong Kui Lun (PH–DAP)
P121	Lembah Pantai	101,828	Ahmad Fahmi Mohamed Fadzil (PH–PKR)	35,359	46.09%	13,912	Ramlan Shahean @ Askolani (BN–UMNO)	21,447	27.96%	76,714	Ahmad Fahmi Mohamed Fadzil (PH–PKR)
P121	Lembah Pantai	101,828	Ahmad Fahmi Mohamed Fadzil (PH–PKR)	35,359	46.09%	13,912	Fauzi Abu Bakar (PN–PAS)	19,098	24.90%	76,714	Ahmad Fahmi Mohamed Fadzil (PH–PKR)
P121	Lembah Pantai	101,828	Ahmad Fahmi Mohamed Fadzil (PH–PKR)	35,359	46.09%	13,912	Noor Asmah Mohd Razalli (GTA–PUTRA)	810	1.06%	76,714	Ahmad Fahmi Mohamed Fadzil (PH–PKR)
P122	Seputeh	124,805	Teresa Kok Suh Sim (PH–DAP)	73,234	83.74%	67,187	Alan Wong Yee Yeng (PN–GERAKAN)	6,047	6.91%	87,454	Teresa Kok Suh Sim (PH–DAP)
P122	Seputeh	124,805	Teresa Kok Suh Sim (PH–DAP)	73,234	83.74%	67,187	Lee Kah Hing (BN–MCA)	6,032	6.90%	87,454	Teresa Kok Suh Sim (PH–DAP)
P122	Seputeh	124,805	Teresa Kok Suh Sim (PH–DAP)	73,234	83.74%	67,187	Lee Wai Hong (IND)	1,276	1.46%	87,454	Teresa Kok Suh Sim (PH–DAP)
P122	Seputeh	124,805	Teresa Kok Suh Sim (PH–DAP)	73,234	83.74%	67,187	Choy San Yeh (IND)	865	0.99%	87,454	Teresa Kok Suh Sim (PH–DAP)
P123	Cheras	101,184	Tan Kok Wai (PH–DAP)	60,294	84.04%	54,448	Ruby Chin Yoke Kheng (PN–BERSATU)	5,846	8.15%	71,746	Tan Kok Wai (PH–DAP)
P123	Cheras	101,184	Tan Kok Wai (PH–DAP)	60,294	84.04%	54,448	Chong Yew Chuan (BN–MCA)	5,606	7.81%	71,746	Tan Kok Wai (PH–DAP)
P124	Bandar Tun Razak	119,185	Wan Azizah Wan Ismail (PH–PKR)	43,476	46.74%	9,817	Kamarudin Jaffar (PN–BERSATU)	33,659	36.18%	93,021	Kamarudin Jaafar (PN–BERSATU)
P124	Bandar Tun Razak	119,185	Wan Azizah Wan Ismail (PH–PKR)	43,476	46.74%	9,817	Chew Yin Keen (BN–MCA)	15,886	17.08%	93,021	Kamarudin Jaafar (PN–BERSATU)

== Federal Territory of Putrajaya ==
#	Constituency	Registered Electors	Winner	Votes	Votes %	Majority	Opponent(s)	Votes	Votes %	Total valid votes	Incumbent
PN 1 | BN 0 | PH 0 | GTA 0 | Independent 0
P125	Putrajaya	42,881	Radzi Md Jidin (PN–BERSATU)	16,002	43.67%	2,310	Tengku Adnan Tengku Mansor (BN–UMNO)	13,692	37.37%	36,643	Tengku Adnan Tengku Mansor (BN–UMNO)
P125	Putrajaya	42,881	Radzi Md Jidin (PN–BERSATU)	16,002	43.67%	2,310	Noraishah Mydin Abdul; Aziz (PH-PKR)	5,988	16.34%	36,643	Tengku Adnan Tengku Mansor (BN–UMNO)
P125	Putrajaya	42,881	Radzi Md Jidin (PN–BERSATU)	16,002	43.67%	2,310	Mohd Rosli Ramli (GTA–BERJASA)	878	2.40%	36,643	Tengku Adnan Tengku Mansor (BN–UMNO)
P125	Putrajaya	42,881	Radzi Md Jidin (PN–BERSATU)	16,002	43.67%	2,310	Samsudin Mohamad Fauzi (IND)	63	0.17%	36,643	Tengku Adnan Tengku Mansor (BN–UMNO)
P125	Putrajaya	42,881	Radzi Md Jidin (PN–BERSATU)	16,002	43.67%	2,310	Lim Fice Bee (IND)	20	0.05%	36,643	Tengku Adnan Tengku Mansor (BN–UMNO)

== Negeri Sembilan ==
#	Constituency	Registered Electors	Winner	Votes	Votes %	Majority	Opponent(s)	Votes	Votes %	Total valid votes	Incumbent
BN 5 | PH 3 | PN 0 | GTA 0 | WARISAN 0 | PSM 0 | Independent 0
P126	Jelebu	59,561	Jalaluddin Alias (BN–UMNO)	21,805	48.10%	8,125	Zulkefly Mohamad Omar (PH–AMANAH)	13,680	30.18%	45,334	Jalaluddin Alias (BN–UMNO)
P126	Jelebu	59,561	Jalaluddin Alias (BN–UMNO)	21,805	48.10%	8,125	Zaharuddin Baba Samon (PN–BERSATU)	9,596	21.17%	45,334	Jalaluddin Alias (BN–UMNO)
P126	Jelebu	59,561	Jalaluddin Alias (BN–UMNO)	21,805	48.10%	8,125	Ahmad Fakri Abu Samah (GTA–PUTRA)	253	0.56%	45,334	Jalaluddin Alias (BN–UMNO)
P127	Jempol	95,813	Shamshulkahar Mohd. Deli (BN–UMNO)	30,138	41.98%	5,857	Norwani Ahmat (PH–AMANAH)	24,281	33.82%	71,795	Mohd Salim Mohd Shariff (BN–UMNO)
P127	Jempol	95,813	Shamshulkahar Mohd. Deli (BN–UMNO)	30,138	41.98%	5,857	Muhammad Noraffendy Mohd Salleh (PN–BERSATU)	16,722	23.29%	71,795	Mohd Salim Mohd Shariff (BN–UMNO)
P127	Jempol	95,813	Shamshulkahar Mohd. Deli (BN–UMNO)	30,138	41.98%	5,857	Mohd Khalid Mohd Yunus (GTA–PUTRA)	654	0.91%	71,795	Mohd Salim Mohd Shariff (BN–UMNO)
P128	Seremban	157,244	Anthony Loke Siew Fook (PH–DAP)	63,916	51.84%	30,841	Mohd Fadli Che Me (PN–PAS)	33,075	26.83%	123,284	Anthony Loke Siew Fook (PH–DAP)
P128	Seremban	157,244	Anthony Loke Siew Fook (PH–DAP)	63,916	51.84%	30,841	Felicia Wong Yin Ting (BN–MCA)	24,584	19.94%	123,284	Anthony Loke Siew Fook (PH–DAP)
P128	Seremban	157,244	Anthony Loke Siew Fook (PH–DAP)	63,916	51.84%	30,841	Mohamad Jani Ismail (GTA–PEJUANG)	1,336	1.08%	123,284	Anthony Loke Siew Fook (PH–DAP)
P128	Seremban	157,244	Anthony Loke Siew Fook (PH–DAP)	63,916	51.84%	30,841	Izzat Lesly (IND)	373	0.30%	123,284	Anthony Loke Siew Fook (PH–DAP)
P129	Kuala Pilah	63,247	Adnan Abu Hassan (BN–UMNO)	21,423	44.02%	6,483	Nor Azman Mohamad (PH–PKR)	14,940	30.70%	48,662	Eddin Syazlee Shith (PN–BERSATU)
P129	Kuala Pilah	63,247	Adnan Abu Hassan (BN–UMNO)	21,423	44.02%	6,483	Eddin Syazlee Shith (PN–BERSATU)	11,560	23.76%	48,662	Eddin Syazlee Shith (PN–BERSATU)
P129	Kuala Pilah	63,247	Adnan Abu Hassan (BN–UMNO)	21,423	44.02%	6,483	Kamarulzaman Kamdias (GTA–PUTRA)	406	0.83%	48,662	Eddin Syazlee Shith (PN–BERSATU)
P129	Kuala Pilah	63,247	Adnan Abu Hassan (BN–UMNO)	21,423	44.02%	6,483	Azman Idris (WARISAN)	333	0.68%	48,662	Eddin Syazlee Shith (PN–BERSATU)
P130	Rasah	155,896	Cha Kee Chin (PH–DAP)	81,434	68.04%	61,987	Ng Kian Nam (BN–MCA)	19,447	16.25%	119,691	Cha Kee Chin (PH–DAP)
P130	Rasah	155,896	Cha Kee Chin (PH–DAP)	81,434	68.04%	61,987	David Choong Vee Hing (PN–GERAKAN)	18,810	15.72%	119,691	Cha Kee Chin (PH–DAP)
P131	Rembau	133,555	Mohamad Hasan (BN–UMNO)	53,075	48.50%	19,897	Julfitri Joha (PH–PKR)	33,178	30.32%	109,436	Khairy Jamaluddin (BN–UMNO)
P131	Rembau	133,555	Mohamad Hasan (BN–UMNO)	53,075	48.50%	19,897	Mohd Nazree Mohd Yunus (PN–BERSATU)	21,875	19.99%	109,436	Khairy Jamaluddin (BN–UMNO)
P131	Rembau	133,555	Mohamad Hasan (BN–UMNO)	53,075	48.50%	19,897	Tinagaran Subramaniam (PSM)	779	0.71%	109,436	Khairy Jamaluddin (BN–UMNO)
P131	Rembau	133,555	Mohamad Hasan (BN–UMNO)	53,075	48.50%	19,897	Ramly Awalludin (GTA–PEJUANG)	529	0.48%	109,436	Khairy Jamaluddin (BN–UMNO)
P132	Port Dickson	104,450	Aminuddin Harun (PH–PKR)	42,013	52.40%	23,601	Kamalanathan Panchanathan (BN–MIC)	18,412	22.96%	80,185	Anwar Ibrahim (PH–PKR)
P132	Port Dickson	104,450	Aminuddin Harun (PH–PKR)	42,013	52.40%	23,601	Rafei Mustapha (PN–PAS)	18,235	22.74%	80,185	Anwar Ibrahim (PH–PKR)
P132	Port Dickson	104,450	Aminuddin Harun (PH–PKR)	42,013	52.40%	23,601	Ahmad Idham Ahmad Nazri (GTA–GB)	1,084	1.35%	80,185	Anwar Ibrahim (PH–PKR)
P132	Port Dickson	104,450	Aminuddin Harun (PH–PKR)	42,013	52.40%	23,601	Abdul Rani Kulup Abdullah (IND)	441	0.55%	80,185	Anwar Ibrahim (PH–PKR)
P133	Tampin	81,099	Mohd Isam Mohd Isa (BN–UMNO)	23,283	38.15%	1,276	Muhammad Faiz Fadzil (PH–AMANAH)	22,007	36.06%	61,033	Hasan Bahrom (PH–AMANAH)
P133	Tampin	81,099	Mohd Isam Mohd Isa (BN–UMNO)	23,283	38.15%	1,276	Abdul Halim Abu Bakar (PN–PAS)	14,962	24.51%	61,033	Hasan Bahrom (PH–AMANAH)
P133	Tampin	81,099	Mohd Isam Mohd Isa (BN–UMNO)	23,283	38.15%	1,276	Zamani Ibrahim (GTA–BERJASA)	781	1.28%	61,033	Hasan Bahrom (PH–AMANAH)

== Malacca ==
#	Constituency	Registered Electors	Winner	Votes	Votes %	Majority	Opponent(s)	Votes	Votes %	Total valid votes	Incumbent
PH 3 | PN 3 | BN 0 | GTA 0 | Independent 0
P134	Masjid Tanah	69,174	Mas Ermieyati Samsudin (PN–BERSATU)	25,604	46.77%	4,411	Abdul Hakim Abdul Wahid (BN–UMNO)	21,193	38.71%	54,749	Mas Ermieyati Samsudin (PN–BERSATU)
P134	Masjid Tanah	69,174	Mas Ermieyati Samsudin (PN–BERSATU)	25,604	46.77%	4,411	Mutalib Uthman (MUDA)	7,445	13.60%	54,749	Mas Ermieyati Samsudin (PN–BERSATU)
P134	Masjid Tanah	69,174	Mas Ermieyati Samsudin (PN–BERSATU)	25,604	46.77%	4,411	Handrawirawan Abu Bakar (GTA–PEJUANG)	507	0.93%	54,749	Mas Ermieyati Samsudin (PN–BERSATU)
P135	Alor Gajah	93,311	Adly Zahari (PH–AMANAH)	28,178	38.60%	890	Shahril Sufian Hamdan (BN–UMNO)	27,288	37.38%	73,000	Mohd Redzuan Md Yusof (PN–BERSATU)
P135	Alor Gajah	93,311	Adly Zahari (PH–AMANAH)	28,178	38.60%	890	Mohd Redzuan Md Yusof (PN–BERSATU)	17,211	23.58%	73,000	Mohd Redzuan Md Yusof (PN–BERSATU)
P135	Alor Gajah	93,311	Adly Zahari (PH–AMANAH)	28,178	38.60%	890	Muhammad Nazriq Abdul Rahman (GTA–BERJASA)	323	0.44%	73,000	Mohd Redzuan Md Yusof (PN–BERSATU)
P136	Tangga Batu	115,998	Bakri Jamaluddin (PN–PAS)	37,406	40.65%	8,849	Rusnah Aluai (PH–PKR)	28,557	31.03%	92,027	Rusnah Aluai (PH–PKR)
P136	Tangga Batu	115,998	Bakri Jamaluddin (PN–PAS)	37,406	40.65%	8,849	Lim Ban Hong (BN–MCA)	25,095	27.27%	92,027	Rusnah Aluai (PH–PKR)
P136	Tangga Batu	115,998	Bakri Jamaluddin (PN–PAS)	37,406	40.65%	8,849	Ghazali Abu (GTA–PUTRA)	702	0.76%	92,027	Rusnah Aluai (PH–PKR)
P136	Tangga Batu	115,998	Bakri Jamaluddin (PN–PAS)	37,406	40.65%	8,849	Shahril Mahmood (IND)	267	0.29%	92,027	Rusnah Aluai (PH–PKR)
P137	Hang Tuah Jaya	118,493	Adam Adli Abdul Halim (PH–PKR)	39,418	41.72%	8,638	Mohd Ridhwan Mohd Ali (BN–UMNO)	30,780	32.58%	94,486	Shamsul Iskandar @ Yusre Mohd Akin (PH–PKR)
P137	Hang Tuah Jaya	118,493	Adam Adli Abdul Halim (PH–PKR)	39,418	41.72%	8,638	Mohd Azrudin Md Idris (PN–BERSATU)	23,549	24.92%	94,486	Shamsul Iskandar @ Yusre Mohd Akin (PH–PKR)
P137	Hang Tuah Jaya	118,493	Adam Adli Abdul Halim (PH–PKR)	39,418	41.72%	8,638	Sheikh Ikhzan Sheikh Salleh (GTA–PEJUANG)	739	0.78%	94,486	Shamsul Iskandar @ Yusre Mohd Akin (PH–PKR)
P138	Kota Melaka	164,140	Khoo Poay Tiong (PH–DAP)	73,995	60.07%	46,420	Suhaime Borhan (PN–GERAKAN)	27,575	22.39%	123,181	Khoo Poay Tiong (PH–DAP)
P138	Kota Melaka	164,140	Khoo Poay Tiong (PH–DAP)	73,995	60.07%	46,420	Kon Qi Yao (BN–MCA)	20,686	16.79%	123,181	Khoo Poay Tiong (PH–DAP)
P138	Kota Melaka	164,140	Khoo Poay Tiong (PH–DAP)	73,995	60.07%	46,420	Norazlanshah Hazali (IND)	925	0.75%	123,181	Khoo Poay Tiong (PH–DAP)
P139	Jasin	96,208	Zulkifli Ismail (PN–PAS)	27,893	35.95%	322	Roslan Ahmad (BN–UMNO)	27,571	35.53%	77,598	Ahmad Hamzah (BN–UMNO)
P139	Jasin	96,208	Zulkifli Ismail (PN–PAS)	27,893	35.95%	322	Harun Mohamed (PH–AMANAH)	21,674	27.93%	77,598	Ahmad Hamzah (BN–UMNO)
P139	Jasin	96,208	Zulkifli Ismail (PN–PAS)	27,893	35.95%	322	Mohd Daud Nasir (GTA–PEJUANG)	460	0.59%	77,598	Ahmad Hamzah (BN–UMNO)

== Johor ==
#	Constituency	Registered Electors	Winner	Votes	Votes %	Majority	Opponent(s)	Votes	Votes %	Total valid votes	Incumbent
PH 15 | BN 9 | PN 2 | GTA 0 | WARISAN 0 | PRM 0 | Independent 0
P140	Segamat	69,360	Yuneswaran Ramaraj (PH–PKR)	23,437	46.27%	5,669	Ramasamy Muthusamy (BN–MIC)	17,768	35.08%	50,652	Edmund Santhara Kumar Ramanaidu (PBM)
P140	Segamat	69,360	Yuneswaran Ramaraj (PH–PKR)	23,437	46.27%	5,669	Poobalan Ponusamy (PN–BERSATU)	8,385	16.55%	50,652	Edmund Santhara Kumar Ramanaidu (PBM)
P140	Segamat	69,360	Yuneswaran Ramaraj (PH–PKR)	23,437	46.27%	5,669	Syed Hairoul Faizey Syed Ali (GTA–PUTRA)	1,062	2.10%	50,652	Edmund Santhara Kumar Ramanaidu (PBM)
P141	Sekijang	63,981	Zaliha Mustafa (PH–PKR)	18,941	39.21%	1,734	Md Salleheen Mohamad (BN–UMNO)	17,207	35.67%	48,237	Natrah Ismail (PH–PKR)
P141	Sekijang	63,981	Zaliha Mustafa (PH–PKR)	18,941	39.21%	1,734	Uzzair Ismail (PN–BERSATU)	11,612	24.07%	48,237	Natrah Ismail (PH–PKR)
P141	Sekijang	63,981	Zaliha Mustafa (PH–PKR)	18,941	39.21%	1,734	Mohd Zohar Ahmad (WARISAN)	339	0.70%	48,237	Natrah Ismail (PH–PKR)
P141	Sekijang	63,981	Zaliha Mustafa (PH–PKR)	18,941	39.21%	1,734	Mohd Saiful Faizal Abd Halim (GTA–PUTRA)	138	0.29%	48,237	Natrah Ismail (PH–PKR)
P142	Labis	49,846	Pang Hok Liong (PH–DAP)	16,133	46.43%	2,833	Chua Tee Yong (BN–MCA)	13,300	38.28%	34,745	Pang Hok Liong (PH–DAP)
P142	Labis	49,846	Pang Hok Liong (PH–DAP)	16,133	46.43%	2,833	Alvin Chang Teck Kiam (PN–BERSATU)	5,312	15.29%	34,745	Pang Hok Liong (PH–DAP)
P143	Pagoh	69,939	Muhyiddin Yassin (PN–BERSATU)	24,986	45.94%	10,007	Iskandar Shah Abdul Rahman (PH–PKR)	14,979	27.54%	54,391	Muhyiddin Yassin (PN–BERSATU)
P143	Pagoh	69,939	Muhyiddin Yassin (PN–BERSATU)	24,986	45.94%	10,007	Razali Ibrahim (BN–UMNO)	14,426	26.52%	54,391	Muhyiddin Yassin (PN–BERSATU)
P144	Ledang	104,577	Syed Ibrahim Syed Noh (PH–PKR)	33,650	41.90%	9,769	Hamim Samuri (BN–UMNO)	23,881	29.74%	80,307	Syed Ibrahim Syed Noh (PH–PKR)
P144	Ledang	104,577	Syed Ibrahim Syed Noh (PH–PKR)	33,650	41.90%	9,769	Zaidi Abd Majid (PN–BERSATU)	22,292	27.76%	80,307	Syed Ibrahim Syed Noh (PH–PKR)
P144	Ledang	104,577	Syed Ibrahim Syed Noh (PH–PKR)	33,650	41.90%	9,769	Rafidah Ridwan (GTA–PEJUANG)	269	0.33%	80,307	Syed Ibrahim Syed Noh (PH–PKR)
P144	Ledang	104,577	Syed Ibrahim Syed Noh (PH–PKR)	33,650	41.90%	9,769	Yunus Mustakim (IND)	140	0.17%	80,307	Syed Ibrahim Syed Noh (PH–PKR)
P144	Ledang	104,577	Syed Ibrahim Syed Noh (PH–PKR)	33,650	41.90%	9,769	Zainal Bahrom (IND)	75	0.09%	80,307	Syed Ibrahim Syed Noh (PH–PKR)
P145	Bakri	97,335	Tan Hong Pin (PH–DAP)	36,636	50.09%	19,254	Chris Lee Ching Yong (BN–MCA)	17,382	23.77%	73,140	Yeo Bee Yin (PH–DAP)
P145	Bakri	97,335	Tan Hong Pin (PH–DAP)	36,636	50.09%	19,254	Chelvarajan Suppiah (PN–BERSATU)	17,222	23.55%	73,140	Yeo Bee Yin (PH–DAP)
P145	Bakri	97,335	Tan Hong Pin (PH–DAP)	36,636	50.09%	19,254	Haron Jaffar (IND)	1,900	2.66%	73,140	Yeo Bee Yin (PH–DAP)
P146	Muar	68,925	Syed Saddiq Syed Abdul Rahman (MUDA)	19,961	37.55%	1,345	Abdullah Husin (PN–PAS)	18,616	35.02%	53,158	Syed Saddiq Syed Abdul Rahman (MUDA)
P146	Muar	68,925	Syed Saddiq Syed Abdul Rahman (MUDA)	19,961	37.55%	1,345	Mohd Helmy Abd Latif (BN–UMNO)	14,581	27.43%	53,158	Syed Saddiq Syed Abdul Rahman (MUDA)
P147	Parit Sulong	79,484	Noraini Ahmad (BN–UMNO)	25,740	40.89%	2,021	Abdul Karim Deraman (PN–PAS)	23,719	37.68%	62,954	Noraini Ahmad (BN–UMNO)
P147	Parit Sulong	79,484	Noraini Ahmad (BN–UMNO)	25,740	40.89%	2,021	Mohd Faizal Dollah (PH–AMANAH)	13,495	21.44%	62,954	Noraini Ahmad (BN–UMNO)
P148	Ayer Hitam	61,041	Wee Ka Siong (BN–MCA)	18,911	40.50%	2,963	Sheikh Umar Bagharib Ali (PH–DAP)	15,948	34.16%	46,692	Wee Ka Siong (BN–MCA)
P148	Ayer Hitam	61,041	Wee Ka Siong (BN–MCA)	18,911	40.50%	2,963	Muhammad Syafiq A Aziz (PN–BERSATU)	11,833	25.34%	46,692	Wee Ka Siong (BN–MCA)
P149	Sri Gading	78,602	Aminolhuda Hassan (PH–AMANAH)	23,242	37.94%	4,000	Mohd Lassim Burhan (BN–UMNO)	19,242	31.41%	61,264	Shahruddin Md Salleh (GTA–PEJUANG)
P149	Sri Gading	78,602	Aminolhuda Hassan (PH–AMANAH)	23,242	37.94%	4,000	Znariyah Abdul Hamid (PN–PAS)	18,475	30.16%	61,264	Shahruddin Md Salleh (GTA–PEJUANG)
P149	Sri Gading	78,602	Aminolhuda Hassan (PH–AMANAH)	23,242	37.94%	4,000	Mahdzir Ibrahim (GTA–PEJUANG)	305	0.50%	61,264	Shahruddin Md Salleh (GTA–PEJUANG)
P150	Batu Pahat	133,910	Onn Abu Bakar (PH–PKR)	45,242	45.47%	15,972	Mohd Rashid Hasnon (PN–BERSATU)	29,270	29.42%	99,494	Mohd Rashid Hasnon (PN–BERSATU)
P150	Batu Pahat	133,910	Onn Abu Bakar (PH–PKR)	45,242	45.47%	15,972	Ishak @ Mohd Farid Siraj (BN–UMNO)	24,309	24.43%	99,494	Mohd Rashid Hasnon (PN–BERSATU)
P150	Batu Pahat	133,910	Onn Abu Bakar (PH–PKR)	45,242	45.47%	15,972	Nizam Bashir Abdul Kariem Bashier (GTA–PEJUANG)	410	0.41%	99,494	Mohd Rashid Hasnon (PN–BERSATU)
P150	Batu Pahat	133,910	Onn Abu Bakar (PH–PKR)	45,242	45.47%	15,972	Zahari Osman (PRM)	263	0.26%	99,494	Mohd Rashid Hasnon (PN–BERSATU)
P151	Simpang Renggam	59,033	Hasni Mohammad (BN–UMNO)	18,312	41.49%	1,821	Maszlee Malik (PH–PKR)	16,491	37.37%	44,131	Maszlee Malik (PH–PKR)
P151	Simpang Renggam	59,033	Hasni Mohammad (BN–UMNO)	18,312	41.49%	1,821	Mohd Fazrul Kamat (PN–BERSATU)	9,077	20.57%	44,131	Maszlee Malik (PH–PKR)
P151	Simpang Renggam	59,033	Hasni Mohammad (BN–UMNO)	18,312	41.49%	1,821	Kamal Kusmin (GTA–PUTRA)	251	0.57%	44,131	Maszlee Malik (PH–PKR)
P152	Kluang	132,342	Wong Shu Qi (PH–DAP)	49,801	52.08%	26,406	Gan Ping Sieu (BN–MCA)	23,395	24.47%	95,621	Wong Shu Qi (PH–DAP)
P152	Kluang	132,342	Wong Shu Qi (PH–DAP)	49,801	52.08%	26,406	Dzulkarnain Alias (PN–BERSATU)	22,021	23.03%	95,621	Wong Shu Qi (PH–DAP)
P152	Kluang	132,342	Wong Shu Qi (PH–DAP)	49,801	52.08%	26,406	Ramendran Ulaganathan (IND)	404	0.42%	95,621	Wong Shu Qi (PH–DAP)
P153	Sembrong	54,982	Hishammuddin Hussein (BN–UMNO)	22,572	55.15%	10,880	Hasni Abas (PH–PKR)	11,692	28.57%	40,930	Hishammuddin Hussein (BN–UMNO)
P153	Sembrong	54,982	Hishammuddin Hussein (BN–UMNO)	22,572	55.15%	10,880	Aziz Ismail (PN–BERSATU)	6,666	16.29%	40,930	Hishammuddin Hussein (BN–UMNO)
P154	Mersing	66,275	Muhammad Islahuddin Abas (PN–BERSATU)	21,066	44.91%	2,337	Abdul Latif Bandi @ Nor Sebandi (BN–UMNO)	18,729	39.93%	46,906	Abdul Latiff Ahmad (PN–BERSATU)
P154	Mersing	66,275	Muhammad Islahuddin Abas (PN–BERSATU)	21,066	44.91%	2,337	Fatin Zulaikha Zaidi (PH–DAP)	6,813	14.52%	46,906	Abdul Latiff Ahmad (PN–BERSATU)
P154	Mersing	66,275	Muhammad Islahuddin Abas (PN–BERSATU)	21,066	44.91%	2,337	Nurfatimah Ibrahim (GTA–PEJUANG)	209	0.45%	46,906	Abdul Latiff Ahmad (PN–BERSATU)
P154	Mersing	66,275	Muhammad Islahuddin Abas (PN–BERSATU)	21,066	44.91%	2,337	Ismail Don (IND)	89	0.19%	46,906	Abdul Latiff Ahmad (PN–BERSATU)
P155	Tenggara	67,294	Manndzri Nasib (BN–UMNO)	21,185	41.26%	2,991	Mohd Nazari Mokhtar (PN–PAS)	18,194	35.43%	51,350	Adham Baba (BN–UMNO)
P155	Tenggara	67,294	Manndzri Nasib (BN–UMNO)	21,185	41.26%	2,991	Zuraidah Zainab Mohd Zain (PH–PKR)	11,618	22.63%	51,350	Adham Baba (BN–UMNO)
P155	Tenggara	67,294	Manndzri Nasib (BN–UMNO)	21,185	41.26%	2,991	M Azhar Palal (GTA–PUTRA)	353	0.69%	51,350	Adham Baba (BN–UMNO)
P156	Kota Tinggi	61,291	Mohamed Khaled Nordin (BN–UMNO)	25,410	53.68%	8,390	Mohamad Ridhwan Rasman (PN–BERSATU)	17,020	35.96%	47,333	Halimah Mohamed Sadique (BN–UMNO)
P156	Kota Tinggi	61,291	Mohamed Khaled Nordin (BN–UMNO)	25,410	53.68%	8,390	Onn Jaafar (PH–AMANAH)	4,903	10.36%	47,333	Halimah Mohamed Sadique (BN–UMNO)
P157	Pengerang	55,316	Azalina Othman Said (BN–UMNO)	21,738	51.96%	5,010	Fairulnizar Rahmat (PN–BERSATU)	16,728	39.96%	41,840	Azalina Othman Said (BN–UMNO)
P157	Pengerang	55,316	Azalina Othman Said (BN–UMNO)	21,738	51.96%	5,010	Che Zakaria Mohd Salleh (PH–AMANAH)	3,374	8.06%	41,840	Azalina Othman Said (BN–UMNO)
P158	Tebrau	223,301	Jimmy Puah Wee Tse (PH–PKR)	83,959	49.99%	30,720	Mohamad Isa Mohamad Basir (PN–BERSATU)	53,239	31.70%	167,965	Steven Choong Shiau Yoon (PBM)
P158	Tebrau	223,301	Jimmy Puah Wee Tse (PH–PKR)	83,959	49.99%	30,720	Nicole Wong Siaw Ting (BN–MCA)	30,767	18.32%	167,965	Steven Choong Shiau Yoon (PBM)
P159	Pasir Gudang	198,485	Hassan Abdul Karim (PH–PKR)	71,223	47.72%	31,558	Mohamad Farid Abdul Razak (PN–BERSATU)	39,675	26.58%	149,280	Hassan Abdul Karim (PH–PKR)
P159	Pasir Gudang	198,485	Hassan Abdul Karim (PH–PKR)	71,223	47.72%	31,558	Noor Azleen Ambros (BN–UMNO)	37,369	25.03%	149,280	Hassan Abdul Karim (PH–PKR)
P159	Pasir Gudang	198,485	Hassan Abdul Karim (PH–PKR)	71,223	47.72%	31,558	Mohammad Raffi Beran (GTA–IMAN)	1,003	0.67%	149,280	Hassan Abdul Karim (PH–PKR)
P160	Johor Bahru	136,368	Akmal Nasrullah Mohd Nasir (PH–PKR)	43,252	45.82%	16,041	Johan Arifin Mohd Ropi (BN–UMNO)	27,211	28.83%	94,393	Akmal Nasrullah Mohd Nasir (PH–PKR)
P160	Johor Bahru	136,368	Akmal Nasrullah Mohd Nasir (PH–PKR)	43,252	45.82%	16,041	Mohd Mohtaj Yacob (PN–BERSATU)	22,075	23.39%	94,393	Akmal Nasrullah Mohd Nasir (PH–PKR)
P160	Johor Bahru	136,368	Akmal Nasrullah Mohd Nasir (PH–PKR)	43,252	45.82%	16,041	Mohd Akhiri Mahmood (GTA–PEJUANG)	1,855	1.97%	94,393	Akmal Nasrullah Mohd Nasir (PH–PKR)
P161	Pulai	165,313	Salahuddin Ayub (PH–AMANAH)	64,900	55.33%	33,174	Nur Jazlan Mohamed (BN–UMNO)	31,726	27.05%	117,303	Salahuddin Ayub (PH–AMANAH)
P161	Pulai	165,313	Salahuddin Ayub (PH–AMANAH)	64,900	55.33%	33,174	Loh Kah Yong (PN–GERAKAN)	20,677	17.63%	117,303	Salahuddin Ayub (PH–AMANAH)
P162	Iskandar Puteri	222,437	Liew Chin Tong (PH–DAP)	96,819	59.15%	60,036	Jason Teoh Sew Hock (BN–MCA)	36,783	22.47%	163,680	Lim Kit Siang (PH–DAP)
P162	Iskandar Puteri	222,437	Liew Chin Tong (PH–DAP)	96,819	59.15%	60,036	Jashen Tan Nam Cha (PN–BERSATU)	30,078	18.38%	163,680	Lim Kit Siang (PH–DAP)
P163	Kulai	151,247	Teo Nie Ching (PH–DAP)	65,529	56.86%	36,023	Chua Jian Boon (BN–MCA)	29,506	25.60%	115,253	Teo Nie Ching (PH–DAP)
P163	Kulai	151,247	Teo Nie Ching (PH–DAP)	65,529	56.86%	36,023	Tan Chin Hok (PN–GERAKAN)	20,218	17.54%	115,253	Teo Nie Ching (PH–DAP)
P164	Pontian	75,212	Ahmad Maslan (BN–UMNO)	23,201	40.81%	5,758	Isa Ab Hamid (PN–BERSATU)	17,443	30.68%	56,851	Ahmad Maslan (BN–UMNO)
P164	Pontian	75,212	Ahmad Maslan (BN–UMNO)	23,201	40.81%	5,758	Shazwan Zainal Abidin (PH–DAP)	15,901	27.97%	56,851	Ahmad Maslan (BN–UMNO)
P164	Pontian	75,212	Ahmad Maslan (BN–UMNO)	23,201	40.81%	5,758	Jamaluddin Mohamad (GTA–GB)	306	0.54%	56,851	Ahmad Maslan (BN–UMNO)
P165	Tanjung Piai	70,679	Wee Jeck Seng (BN–MCA)	23,593	43.22%	6,360	Lim Wei Jiet (MUDA)	17,233	31.57%	54,588	Wee Jeck Seng (BN–MCA)
P165	Tanjung Piai	70,679	Wee Jeck Seng (BN–MCA)	23,593	43.22%	6,360	Najwah Halimah Ab Alim (PN–BERSATU)	13,762	25.21%	54,588	Wee Jeck Seng (BN–MCA)

== Federal Territory of Labuan ==
#	Constituency	Registered Electors	Winner	Votes	Votes %	Majority	Opponent(s)	Votes	Votes %	Total valid votes	Incumbent
PN 1 | BN 0 | WARISAN 0 | PH 0 | PBM 0 | GTA 0
P166	Labuan	44,484	Suhaili Abdul Rahman (PN–BERSATU)	8,124	28.56%	708	Bashir Alias (BN–UMNO)	7,416	26.07%	28,449	Rozman Isli (WARISAN)
P166	Labuan	44,484	Suhaili Abdul Rahman (PN–BERSATU)	8,124	28.56%	708	Rozman Isli (WARISAN)	7,310	25.70%	28,449	Rozman Isli (WARISAN)
P166	Labuan	44,484	Suhaili Abdul Rahman (PN–BERSATU)	8,124	28.56%	708	Ramli Tahir (PH–AMANAH)	5,307	18.65%	28,449	Rozman Isli (WARISAN)
P166	Labuan	44,484	Suhaili Abdul Rahman (PN–BERSATU)	8,124	28.56%	708	Dayang Rusimah @ Raynie Mohd Din (PBM)	202	0.71%	28,449	Rozman Isli (WARISAN)
P166	Labuan	44,484	Suhaili Abdul Rahman (PN–BERSATU)	8,124	28.56%	708	Ramle Mat Daly (GTA–PUTRA)	90	0.32%	28,449	Rozman Isli (WARISAN)

== Sabah ==
#	Constituency	Registered Electors	Winner	Votes	Votes %	Majority	Opponent(s)	Votes	Votes %	Total valid votes	Incumbent
BN 7 | GRS 6 | PH 5 | WARISAN 3 | Independent 2 | KDM 1 | GTA 0 | PPRS 0
P167	Kudat	75,724	Verdon Bahanda (IND)	16,323	36.19%	1,967	Ruddy Awah (GRS–BERSATU Sabah)	14,356	31.83%	45,108	Abdul Rahim Bakri (GRS–BERSATU Sabah)
P167	Kudat	75,724	Verdon Bahanda (IND)	16,323	36.19%	1,967	Abdul Rashid Abdul Harun (WARISAN)	9,421	20.89%	45,108	Abdul Rahim Bakri (GRS–BERSATU Sabah)
P167	Kudat	75,724	Verdon Bahanda (IND)	16,323	36.19%	1,967	Thonny Chee (PH–PKR)	4,726	10.48%	45,108	Abdul Rahim Bakri (GRS–BERSATU Sabah)
P167	Kudat	75,724	Verdon Bahanda (IND)	16,323	36.19%	1,967	Nur Alya Humaira Usun Abdullah (GTA–PEJUANG)	282	0.63%	45,108	Abdul Rahim Bakri (GRS–BERSATU Sabah)
P168	Kota Marudu	80,735	Wetrom Bahanda (KDM)	24,318	48.69%	8,174	Maximus Ongkili (GRS–PBS)	16,144	32.32%	49,946	Maximus Ongkili (GRS–PBS)
P168	Kota Marudu	80,735	Wetrom Bahanda (KDM)	24,318	48.69%	8,174	Jilid Kuminding @ Zainuddin (WARISAN)	5,320	10.65%	49,946	Maximus Ongkili (GRS–PBS)
P168	Kota Marudu	80,735	Wetrom Bahanda (KDM)	24,318	48.69%	8,174	Shahrizal Denci (MUDA)	3,225	6.46%	49,946	Maximus Ongkili (GRS–PBS)
P168	Kota Marudu	80,735	Wetrom Bahanda (KDM)	24,318	48.69%	8,174	Norman Tulang (IND)	660	1.32%	49,946	Maximus Ongkili (GRS–PBS)
P168	Kota Marudu	80,735	Wetrom Bahanda (KDM)	24,318	48.69%	8,174	Mohd Azmee Zulkiflee (GTA–PEJUANG)	279	0.56%	49,946	Maximus Ongkili (GRS–PBS)
P169	Kota Belud	79,885	Isnaraissah Munirah Majilis @ Fakharudy (WARISAN)	25,148	46.54%	4,582	Abdul Rahman Dahlan (BN–UMNO)	20,566	38.06%	54,037	Isnaraissah Munirah Majilis @ Fakharudy (WARISAN)
P169	Kota Belud	79,885	Isnaraissah Munirah Majilis @ Fakharudy (WARISAN)	25,148	46.54%	4,582	Madeli @ Modily Bangali (PH–PKR)	8,323	15.40%	54,037	Isnaraissah Munirah Majilis @ Fakharudy (WARISAN)
P170	Tuaran	83,419	Wilfred Madius Tangau (PH–UPKO)	24,943	42.84%	233	Joniston Bangkuai (GRS–PBS)	24,710	42.44%	58,277	Wilfred Madius Tangau (PH–UPKO)
P170	Tuaran	83,419	Wilfred Madius Tangau (PH–UPKO)	24,943	42.84%	233	Joanna Rampas (WARISAN)	5,728	9.84%	58,277	Wilfred Madius Tangau (PH–UPKO)
P170	Tuaran	83,419	Wilfred Madius Tangau (PH–UPKO)	24,943	42.84%	233	Noortaip Suhaili @ Sualee (IND)	2,008	3.54%	58,277	Wilfred Madius Tangau (PH–UPKO)
P170	Tuaran	83,419	Wilfred Madius Tangau (PH–UPKO)	24,943	42.84%	233	Muminin Kalingkong @ Norbinsha (GTA–PEJUANG)	445	0.76%	58,277	Wilfred Madius Tangau (PH–UPKO)
P170	Tuaran	83,419	Wilfred Madius Tangau (PH–UPKO)	24,943	42.84%	233	Boby Lewat (IND)	393	0.67%	58,277	Wilfred Madius Tangau (PH–UPKO)
P171	Sepanggar	108,370	Mustapha @ Mohd Yunus Sakmud (PH–PKR)	27,022	38.44%	7,042	Yakubah Khan (BN–UMNO)	19,980	28.42%	70,304	Mohd Azis Jamman (WARISAN)
P171	Sepanggar	108,370	Mustapha @ Mohd Yunus Sakmud (PH–PKR)	27,022	38.44%	7,042	Mohd Azis Jamman (WARISAN)	18,594	26.45%	70,304	Mohd Azis Jamman (WARISAN)
P171	Sepanggar	108,370	Mustapha @ Mohd Yunus Sakmud (PH–PKR)	27,022	38.44%	7,042	Jumardie Lukman (KDM)	3,977	5.66%	70,304	Mohd Azis Jamman (WARISAN)
P171	Sepanggar	108,370	Mustapha @ Mohd Yunus Sakmud (PH–PKR)	27,022	38.44%	7,042	Yusof Kunchang (GTA–PEJUANG)	731	1.04%	70,304	Mohd Azis Jamman (WARISAN)
P172	Kota Kinabalu	74,059	Chan Foong Hin (PH–DAP)	31,359	71.08%	23,783	Amanda Yeo Yan Yin (WARISAN)	7,576	17.17%	44,120	Chan Foong Hin (PH–DAP)
P172	Kota Kinabalu	74,059	Chan Foong Hin (PH–DAP)	31,359	71.08%	23,783	Yee Tsai Yiew (GRS–PBS)	4,592	10.41%	44,120	Chan Foong Hin (PH–DAP)
P172	Kota Kinabalu	74,059	Chan Foong Hin (PH–DAP)	31,359	71.08%	23,783	Winston Liew Kit Siong (KDM)	456	1.03%	44,120	Chan Foong Hin (PH–DAP)
P172	Kota Kinabalu	74,059	Chan Foong Hin (PH–DAP)	31,359	71.08%	23,783	Marcel Jude (IND)	137	0.31%	44,120	Chan Foong Hin (PH–DAP)
P173	Putatan	63,173	Shahelmey Yahya (BN–UMNO)	16,234	39.36%	124	Awang Husaini Sahari (PH–PKR)	16,110	39.06%	41,249	Awang Husaini Sahari (PH–PKR)
P173	Putatan	63,173	Shahelmey Yahya (BN–UMNO)	16,234	39.36%	124	Ahmad Mohd Said (WARISAN)	8,511	20.63%	41,249	Awang Husaini Sahari (PH–PKR)
P173	Putatan	63,173	Shahelmey Yahya (BN–UMNO)	16,234	39.36%	124	Poyne Tudus @ Patrick Payne (GTA–GB)	394	0.96%	41,249	Awang Husaini Sahari (PH–PKR)
P174	Penampang	77,214	Ewon Benedick (PH–UPKO)	29,066	57.30%	14,410	Ignatius Dorell Leiking (WARISAN)	14,656	28.89%	50,730	Ignatius Dorell Leiking (WARISAN)
P174	Penampang	77,214	Ewon Benedick (PH–UPKO)	29,066	57.30%	14,410	Kenny Chua Teck Ho (GRS–STAR)	6,719	13.24%	50,730	Ignatius Dorell Leiking (WARISAN)
P174	Penampang	77,214	Ewon Benedick (PH–UPKO)	29,066	57.30%	14,410	Richard Jimmy (IND)	289	0.57%	50,730	Ignatius Dorell Leiking (WARISAN)
P175	Papar	59,942	Armizan Mohd Ali (GRS–BERSATU Sabah)	22,620	51.99%	12,224	Ahmad Hassan (WARISAN)	10,396	23.89%	43,509	Ahmad Hassan (WARISAN)
P175	Papar	59,942	Armizan Mohd Ali (GRS–BERSATU Sabah)	22,620	51.99%	12,224	Henry Shim Chee On (PH–DAP)	9,144	21.02%	43,509	Ahmad Hassan (WARISAN)
P175	Papar	59,942	Armizan Mohd Ali (GRS–BERSATU Sabah)	22,620	51.99%	12,224	Nicholas Sylvester @ Berry (GTA–PEJUANG)	783	1.80%	43,509	Ahmad Hassan (WARISAN)
P175	Papar	59,942	Armizan Mohd Ali (GRS–BERSATU Sabah)	22,620	51.99%	12,224	Johnny Sitamin (IND)	335	0.77%	43,509	Ahmad Hassan (WARISAN)
P175	Papar	59,942	Armizan Mohd Ali (GRS–BERSATU Sabah)	22,620	51.99%	12,224	Norbert Chin (IND)	231	0.53%	43,509	Ahmad Hassan (WARISAN)
P176	Kimanis	40,763	Mohamad Alamin (BN–UMNO)	13,004	41.86%	3,037	Daud Yusof (WARISAN)	9,967	32.08%	31,068	Mohamad Alamin (BN–UMNO)
P176	Kimanis	40,763	Mohamad Alamin (BN–UMNO)	13,004	41.86%	3,037	Amat Mohd Yusof (KDM)	4,013	12.92%	31,068	Mohamad Alamin (BN–UMNO)
P176	Kimanis	40,763	Mohamad Alamin (BN–UMNO)	13,004	41.86%	3,037	Rowindy Lawrence Odong (PH–UPKO)	3,931	12.65%	31,068	Mohamad Alamin (BN–UMNO)
P176	Kimanis	40,763	Mohamad Alamin (BN–UMNO)	13,004	41.86%	3,037	Yusop Osman (GTA–PEJUANG)	153	0.49%	31,068	Mohamad Alamin (BN–UMNO)
P177	Beaufort	43,248	Siti Aminah Aching (BN–UMNO)	10,570	36.08%	2,518	Johair Mat Lani (KDM)	8,052	27.48%	29,298	Azizah Mohd Dun (GRS–BERSATU Sabah)
P177	Beaufort	43,248	Siti Aminah Aching (BN–UMNO)	10,570	36.08%	2,518	Dikin Musah (PH–PKR)	7,835	26.74%	29,298	Azizah Mohd Dun (GRS–BERSATU Sabah)
P177	Beaufort	43,248	Siti Aminah Aching (BN–UMNO)	10,570	36.08%	2,518	Masri Adul (WARISAN)	2,152	7.35%	29,298	Azizah Mohd Dun (GRS–BERSATU Sabah)
P177	Beaufort	43,248	Siti Aminah Aching (BN–UMNO)	10,570	36.08%	2,518	Johan @ Christopher O T Ghani (IND)	546	1.86%	29,298	Azizah Mohd Dun (GRS–BERSATU Sabah)
P177	Beaufort	43,248	Siti Aminah Aching (BN–UMNO)	10,570	36.08%	2,518	Matlani Sabli (IND)	143	0.49%	29,298	Azizah Mohd Dun (GRS–BERSATU Sabah)
P178	Sipitang	45,871	Matbali Musah (GRS–BERSATU Sabah)	14,459	49.75%	4,691	Adnan Puteh (WARISAN)	9,768	33.61%	29,061	Yamani Hafez Musa (GRS–BERSATU Sabah)
P178	Sipitang	45,871	Matbali Musah (GRS–BERSATU Sabah)	14,459	49.75%	4,691	Lahirul Latigul (PH–AMANAH)	4,834	16.63%	29,061	Yamani Hafez Musa (GRS–BERSATU Sabah)
P179	Ranau	66,517	Jonathan Yasin (GRS–BERSATU Sabah)	22,606	53.44%	11,092	Apirin Jahalan Taufik Sham (PH–PKR)	11,514	27.22%	42,298	Jonathan Yasin (GRS–BERSATU Sabah)
P179	Ranau	66,517	Jonathan Yasin (GRS–BERSATU Sabah)	22,606	53.44%	11,092	Ewon Ebin (BN–PBRS)	4,254	10.06%	42,298	Jonathan Yasin (GRS–BERSATU Sabah)
P179	Ranau	66,517	Jonathan Yasin (GRS–BERSATU Sabah)	22,606	53.44%	11,092	Markos Siton (WARISAN)	2,657	6.28%	42,298	Jonathan Yasin (GRS–BERSATU Sabah)
P179	Ranau	66,517	Jonathan Yasin (GRS–BERSATU Sabah)	22,606	53.44%	11,092	Azizul Julrin (GTA–PEJUANG)	1,267	3.00%	42,298	Jonathan Yasin (GRS–BERSATU Sabah)
P180	Keningau	87,588	Jeffrey Kitingan (GRS–STAR)	23,155	42.20%	8,056	Grelydia Gillod (PH–DAP)	15,099	27.52%	54,872	Jeffrey Kitingan (GRS–STAR)
P180	Keningau	87,588	Jeffrey Kitingan (GRS–STAR)	23,155	42.20%	8,056	Jake Nointin (KDM)	9,598	17.49%	54,872	Jeffrey Kitingan (GRS–STAR)
P180	Keningau	87,588	Jeffrey Kitingan (GRS–STAR)	23,155	42.20%	8,056	Rasinin Kautis (WARISAN)	7,020	12.79%	54,872	Jeffrey Kitingan (GRS–STAR)
P181	Tenom	42,045	Riduan Rubin (IND)	10,027	35.00%	1,108	Noorita Sual (PH–DAP)	8,919	31.13%	28,649	Noorita Sual (PH–DAP)
P181	Tenom	42,045	Riduan Rubin (IND)	10,027	35.00%	1,108	Jamawi Ja'afar (BN–UMNO)	8,625	30.11%	28,649	Noorita Sual (PH–DAP)
P181	Tenom	42,045	Riduan Rubin (IND)	10,027	35.00%	1,108	Ukim Buandi (WARISAN)	992	3.46%	28,649	Noorita Sual (PH–DAP)
P181	Tenom	42,045	Riduan Rubin (IND)	10,027	35.00%	1,108	Peggy Chaw Zhi Ting (IND)	86	0.30%	28,649	Noorita Sual (PH–DAP)
P182	Pensiangan	55,672	Arthur Joseph Kurup (BN–PBRS)	19,623	52.88%	5,412	Sangkar Rasam (PH–PKR)	14,211	38.29%	37,100	Arthur Joseph Kurup (BN–PBRS)
P182	Pensiangan	55,672	Arthur Joseph Kurup (BN–PBRS)	19,623	52.88%	5,412	Jekerison Kilan (KDM)	1,640	4.42%	37,100	Arthur Joseph Kurup (BN–PBRS)
P182	Pensiangan	55,672	Arthur Joseph Kurup (BN–PBRS)	19,623	52.88%	5,412	Siti Noorhasmahwatty Osman (WARISAN)	1,512	4.07%	37,100	Arthur Joseph Kurup (BN–PBRS)
P182	Pensiangan	55,672	Arthur Joseph Kurup (BN–PBRS)	19,623	52.88%	5,412	Jamani Derimin @ Gampalid (GTA–PEJUANG)	124	0.33%	37,100	Arthur Joseph Kurup (BN–PBRS)
P183	Beluran	44,727	Ronald Kiandee (PN–BERSATU)	11,303	38.53%	1,594	Benedict Asmat (BN–UMNO)	9,709	33.10%	29,334	Ronald Kiandee (GRS–BERSATU Sabah)
P183	Beluran	44,727	Ronald Kiandee (PN–BERSATU)	11,303	38.53%	1,594	Felix Joseph Saang (PH–UPKO)	4,460	15.20%	29,334	Ronald Kiandee (GRS–BERSATU Sabah)
P183	Beluran	44,727	Ronald Kiandee (PN–BERSATU)	11,303	38.53%	1,594	Rowiena Rashid (WARISAN)	3,707	12.64%	29,334	Ronald Kiandee (GRS–BERSATU Sabah)
P183	Beluran	44,727	Ronald Kiandee (PN–BERSATU)	11,303	38.53%	1,594	Hausing Sudin @ Samsudin (GTA–PEJUANG)	155	0.53%	29,334	Ronald Kiandee (GRS–BERSATU Sabah)
P184	Libaran	72,332	Suhaimi Nasir (BN–UMNO)	22,969	51.58%	12,618	Peter Jr Naintin (PH–UPKO)	10,351	23.24%	44,531	Zakaria Edris (GRS–BERSATU Sabah)
P184	Libaran	72,332	Suhaimi Nasir (BN–UMNO)	22,969	51.58%	12,618	SH Bokrata SH Hassan (WARISAN)	9,185	20.63%	44,531	Zakaria Edris (GRS–BERSATU Sabah)
P184	Libaran	72,332	Suhaimi Nasir (BN–UMNO)	22,969	51.58%	12,618	Jeffri @ Amat Pudang (GTA–PEJUANG)	826	1.85%	44,531	Zakaria Edris (GRS–BERSATU Sabah)
P184	Libaran	72,332	Suhaimi Nasir (BN–UMNO)	22,969	51.58%	12,618	Amdan Tumpong (IND)	659	1.48%	44,531	Zakaria Edris (GRS–BERSATU Sabah)
P184	Libaran	72,332	Suhaimi Nasir (BN–UMNO)	22,969	51.58%	12,618	Nordin Khani (PPRS)	541	1.21%	44,531	Zakaria Edris (GRS–BERSATU Sabah)
P185	Batu Sapi	43,916	Khairul Firdaus Akhbar Khan (GRS–BERSATU Sabah)	12,152	44.95%	4,821	Liau Fui Fui (PH–DAP)	7,331	27.11%	27,037	VAC
P185	Batu Sapi	43,916	Khairul Firdaus Akhbar Khan (GRS–BERSATU Sabah)	12,152	44.95%	4,821	Alias Sani (WARISAN)	7,218	26.70%	27,037	VAC
P185	Batu Sapi	43,916	Khairul Firdaus Akhbar Khan (GRS–BERSATU Sabah)	12,152	44.95%	4,821	Boni Yusuf Abdullah @ Narseso P Juanico (GTA–PUTRA)	176	0.65%	27,037	VAC
P185	Batu Sapi	43,916	Khairul Firdaus Akhbar Khan (GRS–BERSATU Sabah)	12,152	44.95%	4,821	Othman Ahmad (IND)	160	0.59%	27,037	VAC
P186	Sandakan	55,542	Vivian Wong Shir Yee (PH–DAP)	16,673	53.92%	11,031	Alex Thien (WARISAN)	5,642	18.25%	30,919	Vivian Wong Shir Yee (PH–DAP)
P186	Sandakan	55,542	Vivian Wong Shir Yee (PH–DAP)	16,673	53.92%	11,031	Lau Chee Kiong @ Thomas Lau (GRS–SAPP)	5,054	16.35%	30,919	Vivian Wong Shir Yee (PH–DAP)
P186	Sandakan	55,542	Vivian Wong Shir Yee (PH–DAP)	16,673	53.92%	11,031	Peter Hii (IND)	2,342	7.57%	30,919	Vivian Wong Shir Yee (PH–DAP)
P186	Sandakan	55,542	Vivian Wong Shir Yee (PH–DAP)	16,673	53.92%	11,031	Syeikh Lokeman (IND)	962	3.11%	30,919	Vivian Wong Shir Yee (PH–DAP)
P186	Sandakan	55,542	Vivian Wong Shir Yee (PH–DAP)	16,673	53.92%	11,031	Lita Tan Abdullah (IND)	246	0.80%	30,919	Vivian Wong Shir Yee (PH–DAP)
P187	Kinabatangan	44,773	Bung Mokhtar Radin (BN–UMNO)	16,842	57.38%	4,330	Mazliwati Abdul Malek (WARISAN)	12,512	42.62%	29,354	Bung Mokhtar Radin (BN–UMNO)
P188	Lahad Datu	100,256	Mohd Yusof Apdal (WARISAN)	27,116	46.64%	4,376	Maizatul Alkam Alawi (BN–UMNO)	22,740	39.11%	58,145	Mohamaddin Ketapi (PBM)
P188	Lahad Datu	100,256	Mohd Yusof Apdal (WARISAN)	27,116	46.64%	4,376	Oscar Sia Yu Hock (PH–DAP)	8,289	14.26%	58,145	Mohamaddin Ketapi (PBM)
P189	Semporna	72,169	Mohd Shafie Apdal (WARISAN)	28,702	73.77%	20,810	Nixon Abdul Habi (GRS–BERSATU Sabah)	7,892	20.28%	38,909	Mohd Shafie Apdal (WARISAN)
P189	Semporna	72,169	Mohd Shafie Apdal (WARISAN)	28,702	73.77%	20,810	Arastam Paradong (PH–PKR)	1,848	4.75%	38,909	Mohd Shafie Apdal (WARISAN)
P189	Semporna	72,169	Mohd Shafie Apdal (WARISAN)	28,702	73.77%	20,810	Ab Rajik Ab Hamid (GTA–PEJUANG)	467	1.20%	38,909	Mohd Shafie Apdal (WARISAN)
P190	Tawau	87,477	Lo Su Fui (GRS–PBS)	19,865	39.19%	3,860	Christina Liew Chin Jin (PH–PKR)	16,065	31.69%	50,687	Christina Liew Chin Jin (PH–PKR)
P190	Tawau	87,477	Lo Su Fui (GRS–PBS)	19,865	39.19%	3,860	Chen Ket Chuin (WARISAN)	11,263	22.22%	50,687	Christina Liew Chin Jin (PH–PKR)
P190	Tawau	87,477	Lo Su Fui (GRS–PBS)	19,865	39.19%	3,860	Mohd Salleh Bacho (IND)	1,776	3.50%	50,687	Christina Liew Chin Jin (PH–PKR)
P190	Tawau	87,477	Lo Su Fui (GRS–PBS)	19,865	39.19%	3,860	Herman Amdas (GTA–PEJUANG)	1,067	2.11%	50,687	Christina Liew Chin Jin (PH–PKR)
P190	Tawau	87,477	Lo Su Fui (GRS–PBS)	19,865	39.19%	3,860	Chin Chee Syn (IND)	651	1.28%	50,687	Christina Liew Chin Jin (PH–PKR)
P191	Kalabakan	83,970	Andi Muhammad Suryady Bandy (BN–UMNO)	23,855	47.68%	9,100	Ma'mun Sulaiman (WARISAN)	14,755	29.49%	50,030	Ma'mun Sulaiman (WARISAN)
P191	Kalabakan	83,970	Andi Muhammad Suryady Bandy (BN–UMNO)	23,855	47.68%	9,100	Noraini Abd Ghapur (PH–PKR)	9,398	18.78%	50,030	Ma'mun Sulaiman (WARISAN)
P191	Kalabakan	83,970	Andi Muhammad Suryady Bandy (BN–UMNO)	23,855	47.68%	9,100	Nur Aini Abdul Rahman (GTA–PEJUANG)	1,681	3.36%	50,030	Ma'mun Sulaiman (WARISAN)
P191	Kalabakan	83,970	Andi Muhammad Suryady Bandy (BN–UMNO)	23,855	47.68%	9,100	Muhamad Dhiauddin Hassan (IND)	341	0.68%	50,030	Ma'mun Sulaiman (WARISAN)

== Sarawak ==
#	Constituency	Registered Electors	Winner	Votes	Votes %	Majority	Opponent(s)	Votes	Votes %	Total valid votes	Incumbent
GPS 23 | PH 6 | PN 1 | PBM 1 | PERKASA 0 | SEDAR 0 | Independent 0
P192	Mas Gading	47,171	Mordi Bimol (PH–DAP)	17,274	55.05%	5,480	Lidang Disen (GPS–SUPP)	11,794	37.59%	31,379	Mordi Bimol (PH–DAP)
P192	Mas Gading	47,171	Mordi Bimol (PH–DAP)	17,274	55.05%	5,480	Ryan Sim Min Leong (PERKASA–PBK)	2,311	7.36%	31,379	Mordi Bimol (PH–DAP)
P193	Santubong	79,540	Nancy Shukri (GPS–PBB)	43,739	84.42%	38,681	Mohamad Zen Peli (PH–AMANAH)	5,058	9.76%	51,809	Wan Junaidi Tuanku Jaafar (GPS–PBB)
P193	Santubong	79,540	Nancy Shukri (GPS–PBB)	43,739	84.42%	38,681	Affendi Jeman (IND)	3,012	5.81%	51,809	Wan Junaidi Tuanku Jaafar (GPS–PBB)
P194	Petra Jaya	109,809	Fadillah Yusof (GPS–PBB)	54,745	79.15%	41,363	Sopian Julaihi (PH–PKR)	13,382	19.35%	69,163	Fadillah Yusof (GPS–PBB)
P194	Petra Jaya	109,809	Fadillah Yusof (GPS–PBB)	54,745	79.15%	41,363	Othman Abdillah (SEDAR)	1,036	1.50%	69,163	Fadillah Yusof (GPS–PBB)
P195	Bandar Kuching	109,710	Kelvin Yii Lee Wuen (PH–DAP)	45,353	71.34%	28,891	Tay Tze Kok (GPS–SUPP)	16,462	25.89%	63,575	Kelvin Yii Lee Wuen (PH–DAP)
P195	Bandar Kuching	109,710	Kelvin Yii Lee Wuen (PH–DAP)	45,353	71.34%	28,891	Voon Lee Shan (PERKASA–PBK)	1,760	2.77%	63,575	Kelvin Yii Lee Wuen (PH–DAP)
P196	Stampin	121,009	Chong Chieng Jen (PH–DAP)	39,310	53.30%	7,158	Lo Khere Chiang (GPS–SUPP)	32,152	43.59%	73,753	Chong Chieng Jen (PH–DAP)
P196	Stampin	121,009	Chong Chieng Jen (PH–DAP)	39,310	53.30%	7,158	Lue Cheng Hing (PERKASA–PBK)	2,291	3.11%	73,753	Chong Chieng Jen (PH–DAP)
P197	Kota Samarahan	82,229	Rubiah Wang (GPS–PBB)	42,278	76.71%	29,445	Abang Abdul Halil Abang Naili (PH–AMANAH)	12,833	23.29%	55,111	Rubiah Wang (GPS–PBB)
P198	Puncak Borneo	79,969	Willie Mongin (GPS–PBB)	29,457	57.58%	13,338	Diog Dios (PH–PKR)	16,119	31.51%	51,154	Willie Mongin (GPS–PBB)
P198	Puncak Borneo	79,969	Willie Mongin (GPS–PBB)	29,457	57.58%	13,338	Iana Akam (PERKASA–PSB)	5,578	10.90%	51,154	Willie Mongin (GPS–PBB)
P199	Serian	65,273	Richard Riot Jaem (GPS–SUPP)	22,876	57.23%	16,697	Alim Impira (IND)	6,179	15.46%	39,974	Richard Riot Jaem (GPS–SUPP)
P199	Serian	65,273	Richard Riot Jaem (GPS–SUPP)	22,876	57.23%	16,697	Elsiy Tinggang (PERKASA–PSB)	5,630	14.08%	39,974	Richard Riot Jaem (GPS–SUPP)
P199	Serian	65,273	Richard Riot Jaem (GPS–SUPP)	22,876	57.23%	16,697	Learry Jabul (PH–DAP)	5,289	13.23%	39,974	Richard Riot Jaem (GPS–SUPP)
P200	Batang Sadong	32,640	Rodiyah Sapiee (GPS–PBB)	18,668	83.18%	14,893	Lahaji Lahiya (PH–AMANAH)	3,775	16.82%	22,443	Nancy Shukri (GPS–PBB)
P201	Batang Lupar	43,072	Mohamad Shafizan Kepli (GPS–PBB)	19,627	71.22%	14,463	Hamdan Sani (PN–PAS)	5,163	18.74%	27,559	Rohani Abdul Karim (GPS–PBB)
P201	Batang Lupar	43,072	Mohamad Shafizan Kepli (GPS–PBB)	19,627	71.22%	14,463	Wel @ Maxwell Rojis (PH–AMANAH)	2,768	10.04%	27,559	Rohani Abdul Karim (GPS–PBB)
P202	Sri Aman	50,164	Doris Sophia Brodi (GPS–PRS)	14,131	44.27%	4,039	Wilson Entabang (PERKASA–PSB)	10,092	31.62%	31,917	Masir Kujat (IND)
P202	Sri Aman	50,164	Doris Sophia Brodi (GPS–PRS)	14,131	44.27%	4,039	Masir Kujat (IND)	5,673	17.77%	31,917	Masir Kujat (IND)
P202	Sri Aman	50,164	Doris Sophia Brodi (GPS–PRS)	14,131	44.27%	4,039	Tay Wei Wei (PH–PKR)	2,021	6.33%	31,917	Masir Kujat (IND)
P203	Lubok Antu	28,995	Roy Angau Gingkoi (GPS–PRS)	6,644	34.44%	100	Johnical Rayong Ngipa (PERKASA–PSB)	6,544	33.92%	19,294	Jugah Muyang (IND)
P203	Lubok Antu	28,995	Roy Angau Gingkoi (GPS–PRS)	6,644	34.44%	100	Jugah Muyang (PN–BERSATU)	5,360	27.78%	19,294	Jugah Muyang (IND)
P203	Lubok Antu	28,995	Roy Angau Gingkoi (GPS–PRS)	6,644	34.44%	100	Langga Lias (PH–PKR)	746	3.87%	19,294	Jugah Muyang (IND)
P204	Betong	41,743	Richard Rapu @ Begri (GPS–PBB)	16,479	61.69%	11,302	Patrick Kamis (PH–PKR)	5,177	19.38%	26,713	Robert Lawson Chuat (GPS–PBB)
P204	Betong	41,743	Richard Rapu @ Begri (GPS–PBB)	16,479	61.69%	11,302	Hasbie Satar (IND)	5,057	18.93%	26,713	Robert Lawson Chuat (GPS–PBB)
P205	Saratok	44,531	Ali Biju (PN–BERSATU)	19,233	62.33%	8,826	Giendam Jonathan Tait (GPS–PDP)	10,397	33.71%	30,841	Ali Biju (PN–BERSATU)
P205	Saratok	44,531	Ali Biju (PN–BERSATU)	19,233	62.33%	8,826	Ibil Jaya (PH–PKR)	1,221	3.96%	30,841	Ali Biju (PN–BERSATU)
P206	Tanjong Manis	32,948	Yusuf Abd. Wahab (GPS–PBB)	16,474	86.52%	13,908	Zainab Suhaili (PH–AMANAH)	2,566	13.48%	19,040	Yusuf Abd. Wahab (GPS–PBB)
P207	Igan	28,290	Ahmad Johnie Zawawi (GPS–PBB)	15,824	93.16%	14,662	Andri Zulkarnaen Hamden (PH–AMANAH)	1,162	6.84%	16,986	Ahmad Johnie Zawawi (GPS–PBB)
P208	Sarikei	55,018	Huang Tiong Sii (GPS–SUPP)	20,080	55.07%	3,697	Roderick Wong Siew Lead (PH–DAP)	16,383	44.93%	36,463	Wong Ling Biu (PH–DAP)
P209	Julau	34,850	Larry Sng Wei Shien (PBM)	9,159	40.64%	1,340	Joseph Salang Gandum (GPS–SUPP)	7,819	34.69%	22,537	Larry Sng Wei Shien (PBM)
P209	Julau	34,850	Larry Sng Wei Shien (PBM)	9,159	40.64%	1,340	Elly Lawai Ngalai (IND)	5,224	23.18%	22,537	Larry Sng Wei Shien (PBM)
P209	Julau	34,850	Larry Sng Wei Shien (PBM)	9,159	40.64%	1,340	Susan George (PERKASA–PBDS)	335	1.49%	22,537	Larry Sng Wei Shien (PBM)
P210	Kanowit	30,988	Aaron Ago Dagang (GPS–PRS)	7,411	41.07%	236	Mohd Fauzi Abdullah @ Joseph (PH–PKR)	7,175	39.77%	18,043	Aaron Ago Dagang (GPS–PRS)
P210	Kanowit	30,988	Aaron Ago Dagang (GPS–PRS)	7,411	41.07%	236	Michael Lias (IND)	2,289	12.69%	18,043	Aaron Ago Dagang (GPS–PRS)
P210	Kanowit	30,988	Aaron Ago Dagang (GPS–PRS)	7,411	41.07%	236	George Chen (IND)	741	4.11%	18,043	Aaron Ago Dagang (GPS–PRS)
P210	Kanowit	30,988	Aaron Ago Dagang (GPS–PRS)	7,411	41.07%	236	Elli Luhat (IND)	427	2.37%	18,043	Aaron Ago Dagang (GPS–PRS)
P211	Lanang	87,356	Alice Lau Kiong Yieng (PH–DAP)	30,120	56.89%	11,544	Wong Ching Yong (GPS–SUPP)	18,576	35.08%	52,946	Alice Lau Kiong Yieng (PH–DAP)
P211	Lanang	87,356	Alice Lau Kiong Yieng (PH–DAP)	30,120	56.89%	11,544	Priscilla Lau (PERKASA–PBK)	3,663	6.92%	52,946	Alice Lau Kiong Yieng (PH–DAP)
P211	Lanang	87,356	Alice Lau Kiong Yieng (PH–DAP)	30,120	56.89%	11,544	Wong Tiing Kiong (IND)	587	1.11%	52,946	Alice Lau Kiong Yieng (PH–DAP)
P212	Sibu	105,875	Oscar Ling Chai Yew (PH–DAP)	31,827	47.45%	7,760	Clarence Ting Ing Horh (GPS–SUPP)	23,527	35.68%	65,942	Oscar Ling Chai Yew (PH–DAP)
P212	Sibu	105,875	Oscar Ling Chai Yew (PH–DAP)	31,827	47.45%	7,760	Wong Soon Koh (PERKASA–PSB)	11,128	16.88%	65,942	Oscar Ling Chai Yew (PH–DAP)
P213	Mukah	46,964	Hanifah Hajar Taib (GPS–PBB)	21,733	78.23%	15,686	Abdul Jalil Bujang (PH–PKR)	6,047	21.77%	27,780	Hanifah Hajar Taib (GPS–PBB)
P214	Selangau	45,743	Edwin Banta (GPS–PRS)	16,078	55.83%	4,986	Umpang Sabang (PH–PKR)	11,092	38.52%	28,796	Baru Bian (PSB)
P214	Selangau	45,743	Edwin Banta (GPS–PRS)	16,078	55.83%	4,986	Henry Joseph Usau (IND)	1,626	5.65%	28,796	Baru Bian (PSB)
P215	Kapit	45,210	Alexander Nanta Linggi (GPS–PBB)	16,522	75.10%	12,402	Khusyairy Pangkas Abdullah (PH–PKR)	4,120	18.73%	21,999	Alexander Nanta Linggi (GPS–PBB)
P215	Kapit	45,210	Alexander Nanta Linggi (GPS–PBB)	16,522	75.10%	12,402	Robert Saweng (PERKASA–PBDS)	1,357	6.17%	21,999	Alexander Nanta Linggi (GPS–PBB)
P216	Hulu Rajang	43,438	Wilson Ugak Kumbong (GPS–PRS)	15,456	66.03%	7,505	Abun Sui Anyit (PH–PKR)	7,951	33.97%	23,407	Wilson Ugak Kumbong (GPS–PRS)
P217	Bintulu	113,599	Tiong King Sing (GPS–PDP)	43,455	61.73%	22,168	Chiew Chan Yew (PH–DAP)	21,287	30.24%	70,392	Tiong King Sing (GPS–PDP)
P217	Bintulu	113,599	Tiong King Sing (GPS–PDP)	43,455	61.73%	22,168	Duke Janteng (PN–BERSATU)	5,650	8.03%	70,392	Tiong King Sing (GPS–PDP)
P218	Sibuti	58,522	Lukanisman Awang Sauni (GPS–PBB)	22,150	65.31%	11,745	Zolhaidah Suboh (PH–PKR)	10,405	30.68%	33,916	Lukanisman Awang Sauni (GPS–PBB)
P218	Sibuti	58,522	Lukanisman Awang Sauni (GPS–PBB)	22,150	65.31%	11,745	Bobby William (PERKASA–PBDS)	1,361	4.01%	33,916	Lukanisman Awang Sauni (GPS–PBB)
P219	Miri	143,229	Chiew Choon Man (PH–PKR)	39,549	50.61%	6,159	Jeffery Phang Siaw Foong (GPS–SUPP)	33,390	42.73%	78,148	Michael Teo Yu Keng (PH–PKR)
P219	Miri	143,229	Chiew Choon Man (PH–PKR)	39,549	50.61%	6,159	Lawrance Lai (PERKASA–PSB)	5,209	6.67%	78,148	Michael Teo Yu Keng (PH–PKR)
P220	Baram	59,535	Anyi Ngau (GPS–PDP)	18,399	61.78%	7,339	Roland Engan (PH–PKR)	11,060	37.14%	29,783	Anyi Ngau (GPS–PDP)
P220	Baram	59,535	Anyi Ngau (GPS–PDP)	18,399	61.78%	7,339	Wilfred Entika (IND)	324	1.09%	29,783	Anyi Ngau (GPS–PDP)
P221	Limbang	41,999	Hasbi Habibollah (GPS–PBB)	14,897	75.25%	9,998	Racha Balang (PH–PKR)	4,899	24.75%	19,796	Hasbi Habibollah (GPS–PBB)
P222	Lawas	33,655	Henry Sum Agong (GPS–PBB)	11,361	62.40%	5,677	Baru Bian (PERKASA–PSB)	5,684	31.22%	18,208	Henry Sum Agong (GPS–PBB)
P222	Lawas	33,655	Henry Sum Agong (GPS–PBB)	11,361	62.40%	5,677	Japar Suyut (PH–PKR)	1,163	6.39%	18,208	Henry Sum Agong (GPS–PBB)
